= Yaw dialect =

Burmese dialect

Yaw
- Native to: Burma
- Region: Magway Division
- Ethnicity: Yaw
- Native speakers: 200,000 (2014)
- Language family: Sino-Tibetan: (Tibeto-Burman); Lolo–Burmese; Burmish; Southern; Burmese; Yaw

Language codes
- ISO 639-3: –
- Glottolog: yaww1238
- ELP: Yaw

The Yaw dialect of Burmese is spoken by 200,000 people near the Chin Hills in Magway Division, particularly in Gangaw District, which comprises Saw, Htilin, and Gangaw. Yaw was classified as a "definitely endangered" language in UNESCO's 2010 Atlas of the World’s Languages in Danger.

The Yaw dialect is very similar to standard Burmese except for the following rhyme changes:

Written Burmese	Standard Burmese	Yaw dialect	Notes
-က်	/-ɛʔ/	/-aʔ/	
-င်	/-ɪɴ/	/-aɴ/	
ောက်	/-aʊʔ/	/-oʔ/	
-တ် -ပ်	/-aʔ/	/-ɛʔ/	
ွတ်	/-ʊʔ/	/wɛʔ/	ဝတ် ([wʊ̀ʔ] in Standard Burmese, [wɛʔ] in Yaw)
-န် -မ်	/-aɴ/	/-ɛɴ/	
-ွန် -မ်	/-ʊ̀ɴ/	/-wɛɴ/	ဝန် ([wʊ̀ɴ] in Standard Burmese, [wɛ̀ɴ] in Yaw)
-ည်	/-ɛ, -e, -i/	/-ɛ/	
