= Pakokku–Kalay Railway =

Railway line in Myanmar

Pakokku–Kalay Railway ပခုက္ကူ-ကလေး ရထားလမ်း
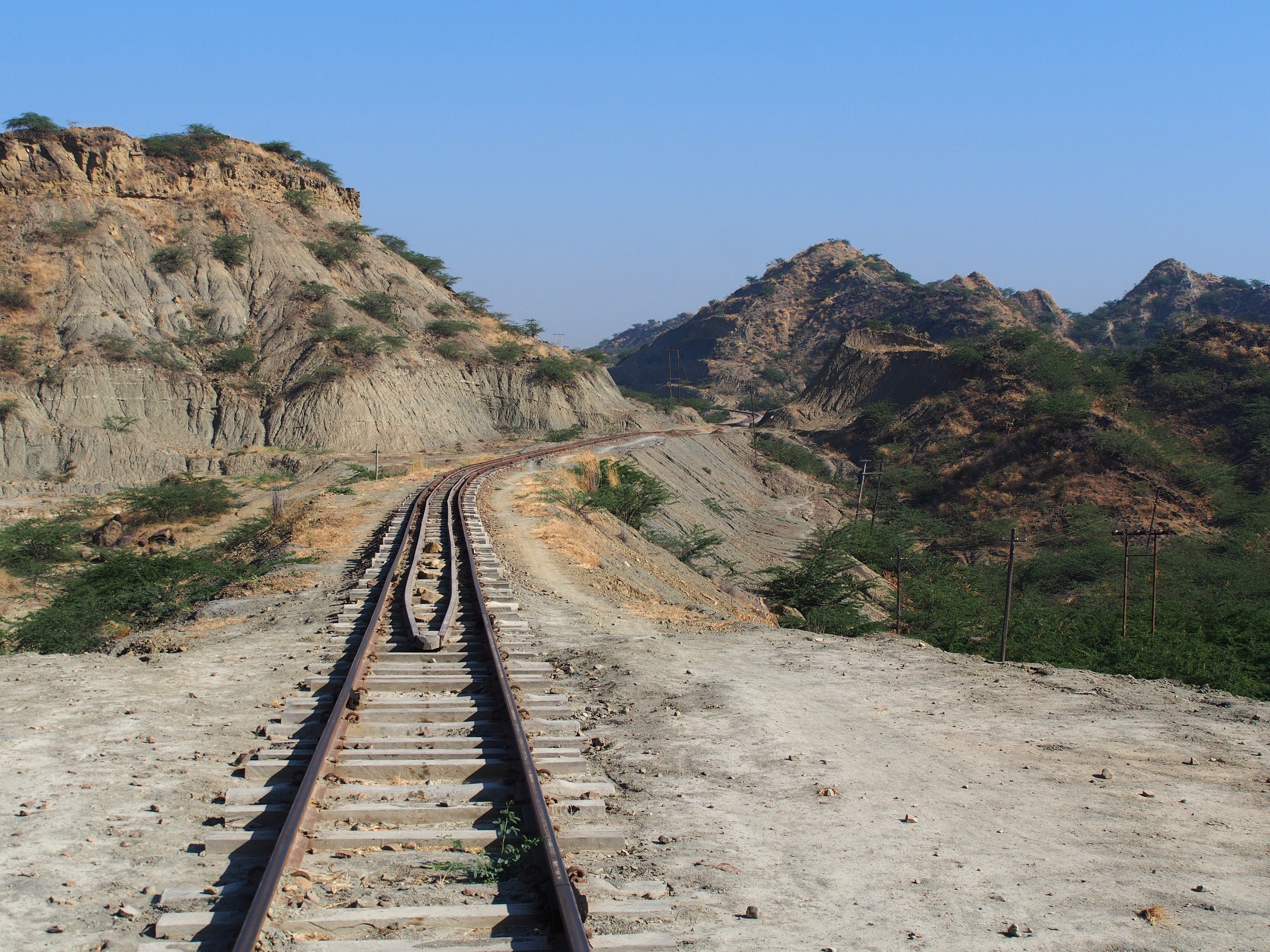

Overview
- Owner: Myanma Railways
- Locale: Sagaing Region

Operation
- Operator: Myanma Railways

Technical
- System length: 274.04 mi (441.02 km)
- Track gauge: 1,000 mm (3 ft 3 3/8 in)

Pakokku–Kalay Railway is a railway line operated by Myanma Railways under the Ministry of Transport and Communications. This railway connects towns on the western bank of the Ayeyarwady River, such as Pakokku, Myaing, Gangaw, and Kalay. The railway spans a total of 240.47 miles in distance, with a track length of 274.04 miles and includes 65 stations.

== History ==
In the 1990s, the government undertook railway expansion projects, which included the construction of the new line from Pakokku to Kalay. This new railway, stretching over 300 kilometers, became one of the longest constructed at that time. The eastern side of Ponnya Mountain sections was opened in 1994 and 1995, and the line reached Kyaw village two years later. The western sections of Ponnya Mountain were opened in 1995 and 1996, and the line reached Yaymyatni in 1997.

To connect Kyaw village on the eastern side of Ponnya Mountain and Yaymyatni village on the western side, a direct route through Ponnya Mountain was planned, bypassing the long mountain road. Instead of a long mountain pass, it was decided to construct the Ponnya Mountain Tunnel, which spans 1.7 kilometers. As a result, the Ponnya Mountain Tunnel became the longest railway tunnel in Myanmar.

Excavation for the Ponnya Mountain Tunnel began in 1996–97, with Myanma Railways and the Myanmar Mining Engineering R,E.D.E. team working together to dig the eastern entrance (50 meters) and the western entrance (30 meters).

The tunnel was officially opened on January 27, 2007, and the completion of the section between Kyaw and Yaymyatni marked the full completion of the Pakokku-Kalay railway line. Plans were proposed to extend the line further to Tamu, a town on the border with India, aiming to connect Myanmar's rail network with the Indian Railways. This would allow Myanma Railways to connect with transcontinental railway networks spanning Turkey, Iran, Pakistan, India, Myanmar, Thailand, Malaysia, and ultimately Singapore.

== Stations ==
- (12) Pakokku 489 Spur Line to (13) Shwe Tan Tit
- (14) Hpone Kan 492 1/4
- (15) Kyauk Hpu 499 1/4
- (16) War Kan 502 1/2
- (17) Paik Thin 507
- (18) Daung Oh 513 3/4
- (19) Myaing 516 1/4
- (20) Myo Soe 523 1/2
- (21) Taung Yoe 526 3/4
- (22) Te Gyi 530 1/4
- (23) Kan Thit 533
- (24) Hpa Lan Kaing 536 3/4
- (25) Thit Kyi Taw 539 1/4
- (26) Wun Tin 544 1/2
- (27) Dat Taw 547
- (28) Nyaung Yin 549 1/4
- (29) Zee Pyar 551
- (30) Min Kaing 553
- (31) Gaung Paung 560
- (32) Kyauk Ka Sin 562/21
- (33) Kyaw Thar 565 1/2
- (34) Tha Yet Chin Lwin Hto 570 1/2
- (35) War Pin 576 1/4
- (36) Kyet Yoe 578 1/2
- (37) Zan Hmway 580 1/2
- (38) Kyaw 582 1/2

Ponnya Mountain Tunnel

- (39) Yae Myet Ni 595 3/4
- (40) Nyaung Lel 599
- (41) Gaung Ton 603
- (42) Me 607 3/4
- (43) Lel Ma 612 3/4
- (44) Pyit Ma 614 3/4
- (45) Gan Gaw 618 1/4
- (46) Lar Boet 623
- (47) Myin Zar 627
- (48) Let Pan 632
- (49) Kan 639 1/4
- (50) Mwayt Lel 644 3/4
- (51) Ye Hla -
- (52) Hnan Khar 650 1/2
- (53) Taung Khin Yan 655 1/4
- (54) Myauk Khin Yan 658 1/2
- (55) Koke Kar -
- (56) Han Thar Wa Di (Chin) 663 1/4
- (57) Man Taw 668 3/4
- (58) Se Taw 674 1/4
- (59) Si Haung 678 1/4
- (60) Than Bo 680 1/2
- (61) He Loke 683 3/4
- (62) Nat Chaung 687 3/4
- (63) Htauk Kyant 693 1/2
- (64) Hto Mar 695 1/2
- (65) Thar Si Le 697 1/2
- (66) Kalay 701 1/2

== Suspension ==
Three and a half years after the line's opening, in 2010, severe rainfall from the Giri Cyclone caused landslides and soil subsidence along the Kyaw-Yaymyatni section in Gangaw Township. As a result, the rail service, which had begun operating on January 17, 2007, was suspended on July 5, 2010. Only limited services could continue on the Gangaw-Hanthawaddy (Chin) and Pakokku-Kyaw sections. Due to fault lines near the Ponnya Mountain Tunnel and high repair costs, the Ministry of Transport and Communications announced during a session of the People's Assembly that there were no plans to repair and reopen the Kyaw-Yaymyatni section.
