= Zin Ni Ni Win =

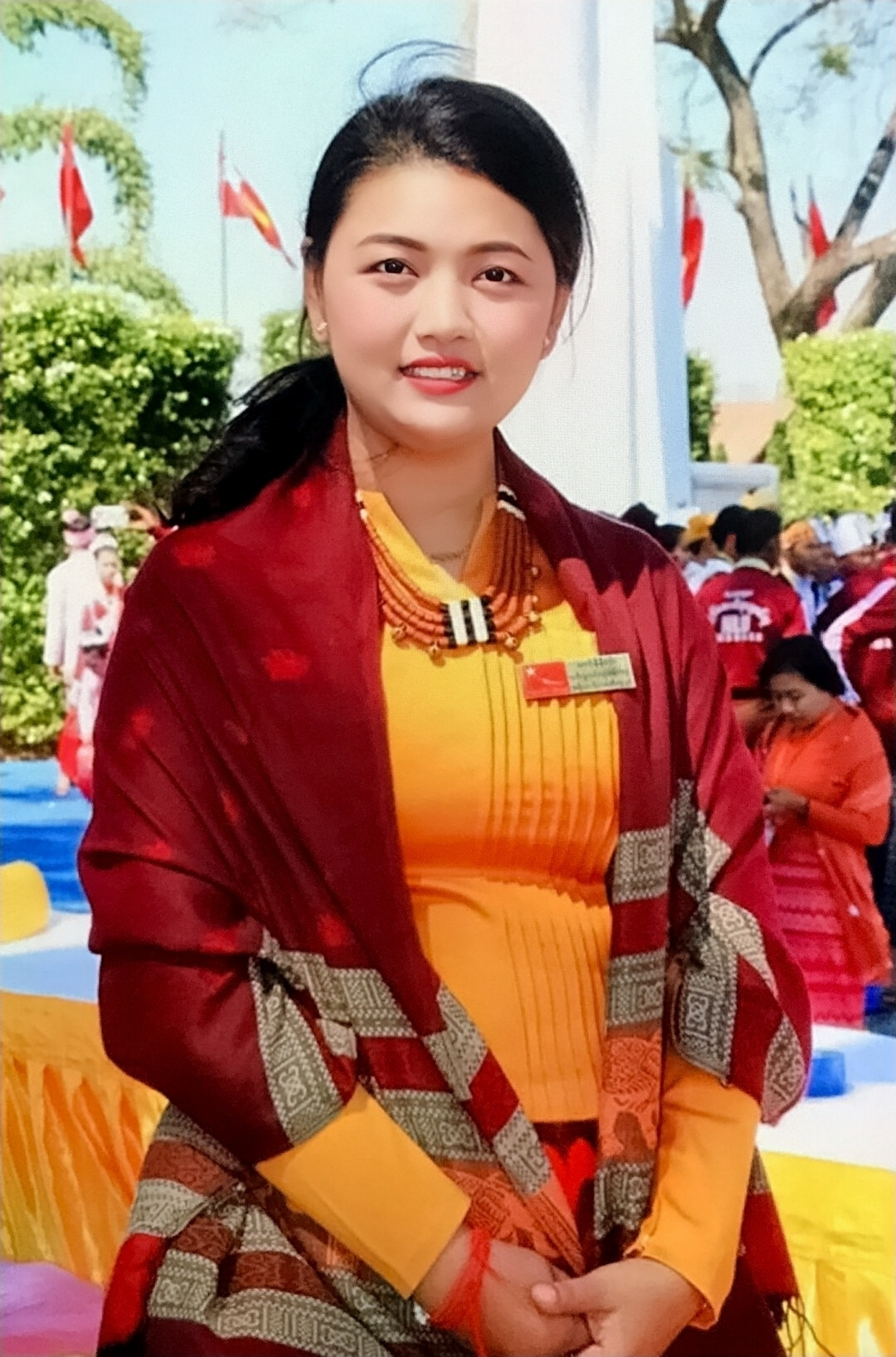
- Zin Zin Win at the General Aung San's memorial birthday on 13 Feb 2019

Member of the Magway Region Hluttaw
- In office 3 February 2016 – 1 February 2021
- Constituency: Pakokku Township № 2
- Majority: 59,444 (72.5%)

Personal details
- Born: 11 February 1989 (age 37) Pakokku, Magway Region, Myanmar
- Party: National League for Democracy
- Parent(s): Zaw Win (father); Win Sint (mother)
- Education: B.A (Chinese language), LCCI level-3, (London Chamber of Commerce and Industry)
- Alma mater: Mandalay University; Mandalay University of Foreign Languages
- Occupation: Politician

Zin Ni Ni Win (Burmese: ဇင်နီနီဝင်း; born 11 February 1989) is a Burmese politician who currently serves as a member of parliament in the Magwe Region Hluttaw for Pakokku Township № 2 constituency. At the age of 26, she was the youngest MP elected in the general election and therefore became the Baby of the House.

== Early life and education ==
Zin Ni Ni Win was born on 11 February 1989 in Pakokku, Magway Region, Myanmar to parents Zaw Win and his wife Win Sint. She is the third daughter of four siblings. She graduated with B.A (Chinese language) from Mandalay University and Mandalay University of Foreign Languages.

== Political career ==
In December 2011, she joined the National League for Democracy and worked as a treasurer for NLD's central youth in 2013. Later, she became co-charge of the NLD's central youth.

In the 2015 Myanmar general election, she contesting for Magway Region Hluttaw from Pakokku Township № 2 parliamentary constituency winning a majority of 59,444 (72.5% of the votes), won a seat.
