= Myint Aung (politician, born 1959) =

Burmese politician and political prisoner

- မြင့်အောင်

Member of the Magway Region Hluttaw
- Incumbent
- Assumed office 8 February 2016
- Constituency: Kamma Township

Member of the Pyithu Hluttaw
- In office 2 May 2012 – 29 January 2016
- Preceded by: Thein Tun
- Succeeded by: Aung Khin Win
- Constituency: Myaing Township

Member-elect of the Pyithu Hluttaw
- Preceded by: Constituency established
- Succeeded by: Constituency abolished
- Constituency: Myaing No. 2
- Majority: 28,340 (72%)

Personal details
- Born: 18 May 1959 (age 67) Burma
- Party: National League for Democracy
- Relations: Thein Maung (father); Khin Than (mother)
- Education: Pakokku Regional College; Rangoon Arts and Science University
- Occupation: Politician

Myint Aung (Burmese: မြင့်အောင်) is a Burmese politician and political prisoner since the 2021 military coup who has served as a Magway Region Hluttaw member of parliament for Kamma Township. In the 1990 Burmese general election, he was elected as an Pyithu Hluttaw MP, winning a majority of 28,340 (72% of the votes), but was never allowed to assume his seat.
