= Seikphyu Township =

- Township
- Location in Pakokku district

- Location within Myanmar
- Coordinates: 21°4′N 94°31′E
- Country: Myanmar
- Region: Magway
- District: Pakokku
- Capital: Seikphyu
- Elevation: 91 m (300 ft)

Population (October 2010)
  - Total: 132,254
- Time zone: UTC+6:30 (MMT)

Seikphyu Township is a township of Pakokku District in Magway Division of Myanmar. The principal town and administrative seat is Seikphyu. To the southeast, the township borders the Irrawaddy where its principal town, Seikphyu, is a port. The township lies between 20° 51' and 21° 15' north latitude and 94° 09' and 94° 48' east longitude. The Yaw River forms the township's eastern boundary. It is one of the areas destroyed by Cyclone Giri on 23 October 2010.

== Borders ==
Seikphyu Township is bordered by:

- Pauk Township, to the north,
- Pakokku Township, to the northeast and east,
- Chauk Township, to the southeast,
- Salin Township, to the south, and
- Saw Township, to the west.

== Economy ==
Agriculture is the major economy of the township. Onion from Seikphyu Township is famous in onion market of Myanmar. Onion is grown along the sandbank of Yaw River from December to April.

== Secret projects ==
The State Peace and Development Council is constructing 2 secret suspected nuclear military projects on the northern side of Seikphyu Township along with other secret projects in Mindon, Padan, Pwintbyu, Sidoktaya, Salin, Pakkoku, Laung Shay (in Saw Township) and Saw Townships. Actually, the sites in Seikphyu Township are 2 factories for the production of military weapons and are not nuclear projects.
