= Lanywa =

Lanywa Lan
- Village
- Location in Burma
- Coordinates: 20°57′33″N 94°48′26″E
- Country: Burma
- Region: Magway Region
- District: Pakokku
- Township: Pakokku
- Time zone: UTC+6.30 (MST)

Lanywa or Lan is a village in the Magway Division in Myanmar on the right (western) bank of the Irrawaddy, just above Seikphyu and Chauk. The town hosts a commercial airport, south-east of town.
