= Killing of Saw Tun Moe =

2022 killing in Myanmar

- Part of the Myanmar civil war
- Location in Myanmar
- Date: 16–17 October 2022
- Location: Taung Myint, Myanmar; 21°23′56″N 94°28′44″E
- Motive: Militarism, opposition to the National Unity Government
- Target: Saw Tun Moe
- Perpetrators: Tatmadaw, Pyusawhti militias

On 17 October 2022, high school teacher Saw Tun Moe was kidnapped and extrajudicially killed by militants associated with Myanmar's State Administration Council. The killing, sparked by Saw Tun Moe's career as an educator at a National Unity Government-affiliated school, was noted for its brutality, with the victim being decapitated and his head being publicly displayed. The killing was subject to international condemnation from the United States.

== Background ==
Prior to the outbreak of the Myanmar civil war Saw Tun Moe had been a private educator in Magway for 20 years, and was director of a boarding school. After participating in protests against the 2021 Myanmar coup d'état, Saw Tun Moe joined a school associated with the anti-coup National Unity Government in the village of Thit Nyi Naung, Pauk Township where he taught mathematics. He also taught at another school, and was involved in the administration of Thit Nyi Naung. At the time of the killing, he was 46 years old.

== Event ==
On 16 October 2022 soldiers affiliated with the State Administration Council entered Thit Nyi Naung as part of a broader campaign of searches throughout the region, abducting Saw Tun Moe from his school. The next day, villagers in Taung Myint, located 3 kilometres from Thit Nyi Naung, noticed that Saw Tun Moe was brought into the village alongside around 130 soldiers from the Tatmadaw (armed forces of Myanmar) and allied Pyusawhti militias. At the time, his hands were tied behind his back.

After troops left Taung Myint on 18 October 2022, residents saw that Saw Tun Moe had been murdered. After his murder, he was decapitated and his head was placed on the gate to his school. Three fingers were cut from the base of his hand and placed between his legs, and campaign posters of Aung San Suu Kyi were placed on the body. The school itself was burned to the ground.

== Reactions ==
The killing drew increased attention to the topic of extrajudicial killings in Myanmar. The United States condemned the killing, with Department of State spokesman Ned Price saying on Twitter, "We are appalled by reports that Burma's military regime arrested, publicly mutilated, and beheaded a schoolteacher in Magway Region. The regime's brutal violence, including against educators, demands a strong response from the international community."

Following the killing, members of the NUG-affiliated People's Defence Force launched two drone strikes against the Tatmadaw, near the settlements of Hpayar Taung and Yae Pyar.
