= Padaingdaw =

Padaingdaw ပန်းတိုင်းတော ကျေးရွာ
- Village

Myanma transcription(s)
  - Burmese: pan: tuing: tau: kye: rwa
- Location in Burma
- Coordinates: 21°29′05.3″N 94°49′33″E
- Country: Myanmar
- Region: Magway Region
- District: Pakokku District
- Township: Myaing Township
- Time zone: UTC+6.30 (MST)

Padaingdaw, also spelled Pan Taing Taw or Pa Daing Taw (Burmese: ပန်းတိုင်းတောကျေးရွာ, MLCTS: pan: tuing: tau: kye: rwa; pronunciation [bədáiɴdɔ́ tɕèjwà]) is a village of Myaing Township in Magway Region of central Myanmar.

== Religious Places ==
- Weizza Gon Yee Monastery-
- Mattahtaung Pagoda -
- Dhamma Vihara Sasana Vimana Monastery -
- Thanbo Zeti
- Taw Zeedaw Monastery

== Education ==
- B.E.H.S (sub) Padaingdaw -
