= Thein Tun =

- သိန်းထွန်း

Minister for Posts and Telecommunications of Myanmar
- In office 30 March 2011 – 16 January 2013
- Preceded by: Thein Zaw

Member of the Pyithu Hluttaw
- In office 31 January 2011 – 30 March 2011
- Preceded by: None
- Succeeded by: Myint Aung
- Constituency: Myaing Township
- Majority: 50,392 (61.49%)

Deputy Minister for Posts and Telecommunications of Myanmar

Personal details
- Born: 5 December 1947 (age 78) Myaing, Burma
- Party: Union Solidarity and Development Party
- Spouse: Mya Mya Win

Military service
- Allegiance: Myanmar
- Branch/service: Myanmar Army
- Years of service: –2010
- Rank: Major-General

Thein Tun (Burmese: သိန်းထွန်း; also spelt Thein Htun; born 5 December 1947) is a retired Burmese Major-general and politician, serving as the Minister for Posts and Telecommunications of Myanmar. In the 2010 Burmese general election, he won a Pyithu Hluttaw seat after contesting the constituency of Myaing Township. He was resigned on 16 January 2013.

== Family ==
Thein Tun was born to parents U Pywat and Daw Phayaon, who have 5 children together.
