= O Yin =

O'Yin အိုရင်းကျေးရွာ
- village

Myanma transcription(s)
  - Burmese: aui rang: kye: rwa
- Location in Burma
- Coordinates: 21°25′32.1″N 94°49′59″E
- Country: Myanmar
- Region: Magway Region
- District: Pakokku District
- Township: Myaing Township
- Time zone: UTC+6.30 (MST)

O Yin (Burmese: အိုရင်းကျေးရွာ, MLCTS: aui rang: kye: rwa; pronunciation [òjɪ́ɴ tɕèjwà]}) is a village of Myaing Township in the Magway Region of central Myanmar.

== Education ==
- B.E.H.S (sub), O Yin

== Religious Places ==
- O Yin Monastery

== Sport ==
- O Yin Playground
