= Thet Mon Aye =

Burmese politician

Member of the Magway Region Hluttaw
- Incumbent
- Assumed office 3 February 2016
- Constituency: Seikphyu Township № 1

Personal details
- Born: 21 September 1979 (age 46) Magway, Myanmar
- Party: National League for Democracy

Thet Mon Aye (Burmese: သက္မြန္ေအး) is a Burmese politician who currently serves as a Magway Region Hluttaw member of parliament for Seikphyu Township No. 1 Constituency. She is a member of the National League for Democracy.

In the 2015 Myanmar general election and 2020 Myanmar general election, she was elected as a Magway Region Hluttaw MP, and elected representative from Seikphyu Township No. 1 parliamentary constituency.
