= Kyaw, Tilin Township =

Kyaw ကျော်
- village
- Location in Burma.
- Coordinates: 21°38′38″N 94°17′43″E
- Country: Burma
- Region: Magway Region
- District: Gangaw
- Township: Tilin
- Elevation: 539 m (1,768 ft)
- Time zone: UTC+6.30 (MST)

Kyaw is a town in Tilin Township, Gangaw District, in the north-western part of the Magway Region in Myanmar. Kyaw lies on the left (eastern) bank of the Pindaung River.
