= Thit Nyi Naung =

Thit Nyi Naung သစ်ညီနောင်
- Location in Myanmar
- Coordinates: 21°22′15″N 94°29′5″E
- Country: Myanmar
- Region: Magway Region
- District: Pakokku District
- Township: Pauk Township
- Village Tract: Taung Myint
- Time zone: UTC+6.30 (MMT)

Thit Nyi Naung (Burmese: သစ်ညီနောင်) is a village in Pauk Township, Magway Region, Myanmar (Burma). It is located in village tact of Taung Myint.

There is a school in the village funded by the pro-democracy National Unity Government of Myanmar. In October 2022, during the Myanmar civil war, troops of the Tatmadaw military junta entered the town and abducted a schoolteacher who was involved in administration, Saw Tun Moe. They took him to nearby Taung Myint, where he was murdered and his body mutilated. The murder was condemned by other countries. In 2019, prior to the civil war, the village had a high school employing 11 teachers serving 295 students as well as a clinic and the second oldest non-profit group in the township.
