= Kyaw, Gangaw Township =

Kyaw ကျော
- Town
- Location in Burma.
- Coordinates: 21°55′38″N 94°21′43″E
- Country: Burma
- Region: Magway Region
- District: Gangaw
- Township: Gangaw
- Elevation: 530 m (1,740 ft)
- Time zone: UTC+6.30 (MST)

Kyaw is a town in Gangaw Township, Pakokku District (Gangaw District), in the north-western part of the Magway Region in Myanmar. It lies on the left (eastern) bank of the Kyaw River.

== Transport ==
The railway from Pakokku to the Myittha River valley runs past Kyaw.
