= Taung Myint =

Taung Myint တောင်မြင့်ရွာ
- Location in Myanmar
- Coordinates: 21°23′56″N 94°28′44″E
- Country: Myanmar
- Region: Magway Region
- District: Pakokku District
- Township: Pauk Township
- Village Tract: Taung Myint
- Time zone: UTC+6.30 (MMT)

Taung Myint (Burmese: တောင်မြင့်ရွာ) is a village in Pauk Township, Pakokku District, Magway Region, Myanmar. It is the main village of the Taung Myint village tract.

== History ==
During the Myanmar civil war that began in 2021, the school closed down in 2021. In October 2022, the village was the site of war crimes by the Tatmadaw military junta. The Tatmadaw soldiers murdered and decapitated a schoolteacher from nearby Thit Nyi Naung, and impaled his head on a gate, leaving his body out. They burned the school as well. The killing was condemned by representatives from the United States. In 2019, before the civil war, the village had a middle school with 9 teachers and 123 students.
