= Pakokku =

Pakokku ပခုက္ကူမြို့
- Town

Myanma transcription(s)
  - Burmese: pa.hkukku mrui.
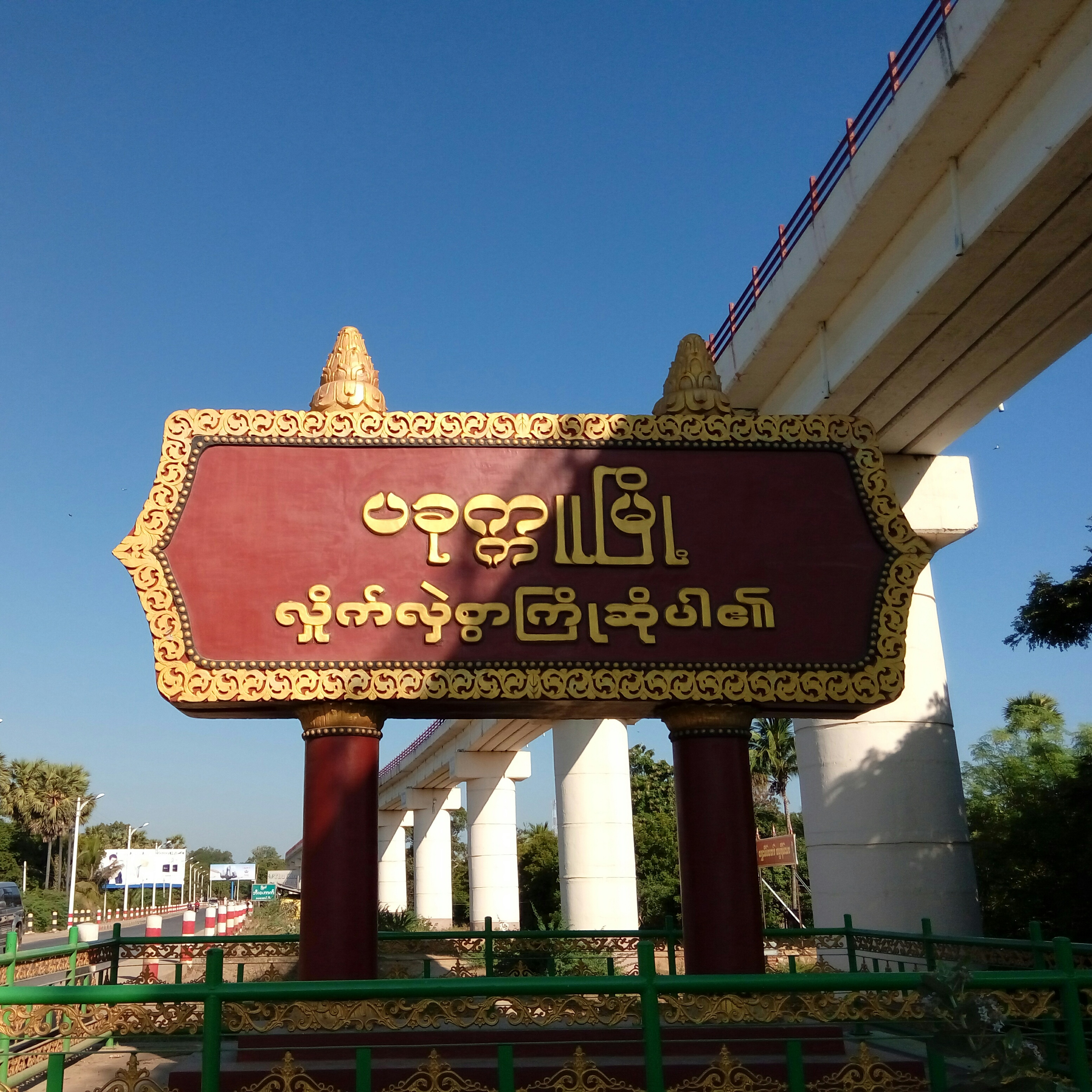

- Location in Myanmar
- Coordinates: 21°20′N 95°54′E
- Country: Myanmar
- Region: Magway Region
- District: Pakokku District
- Township: Pakokku Township

Population (2014)
  - Town: 322,154
  - Urban: 107,557
  - Metro: 214,597
- Time zone: UTC+6.30 (MST)

Pakokku (Burmese: ပခုက္ကူမြို့, [pəkʰoʊʔkù]) is the largest city in the Magway Region of Myanmar. It is situated about 30 km northeast of Bagan on the Irrawaddy River. It is the administration seat of Pakokku Township, Pakokku District and Gangaw District. Pakokku Bridge is part of the India–Myanmar–Thailand Trilateral Highway and is the longest bridge in Myanmar. It is home of the Pakokku Airport.

The city is the location of Computer University, Pakokku, Pakokku Education College, Technological University, Pakokku, and Pakokku University. Thiho Shin Pagoda (The Lord of Sri Lanka Pagoda), Shwe Ku Pagoda, Shwe Mothtaw Pagoda, Shwe Tant Tit, and Phaung Taw Oo Pagoda are famous pagodas in Pakokku. Pakokku is also the largest rice market city of Upper Myanmar.

== Name origin ==
According to legend, the name Pakokku originated during the reign of King Alaungsithu of Pagan. While traveling along the Irrawaddy River by royal barge, King Alaungsithu arrived at Pauk Inn Village. There, Me Sein Nyo, one of his concubines (some versions of the story describe her as a minor queen consort), saw a handsome fisherman and laughed loudly to get his attention. King Alaungsithu noticed this interaction and, in his anger, ordered her execution.

After her death, it was discovered that Me Sein Nyo was pregnant. The executioners separated the unborn child from her body and built a tomb and a small pagoda. The place where this occurred was initially called Tharhtokegu, which means "Child Out Cave". Over many centuries, the name evolved into Pakokku.

== History ==
Before British occupation, Pakokku was a small village and part of both Pakhangyi and Bagan districts. The British occupied Upper Burma on 29 November 1885. On 1 December 1887, British India Government established Pakokku Municipal. On 21 December 1887, British India government ordered Pakokku as a town of Pakhangyi District with a population of 1,985. By the order degree (201) of British Government, Pakhangyi District was abolished and Pakokku District was established on 21 July 1888. In 1901, the population of Pakokku was 19,456. During 13 years, Pakokku's population and developments were increased rapidly.

In 1896, Pakokku became a capital city of Pakokku Hill Tracts Districts. The area under its administration included Pakokku District, Chin State outside Paletwa township, Gangaw District, Naga Self-Administered Zone, Nagaland, Mizoram, Tripura, Manipur and Meghalaya outside Shillong township.

In the early months of 1930, political speeches for Burma's colonial separation from British India were held in Shwegu Pagoda. U Lwin was appointed a new mayor of Pakokku on 7 November 1930. Pakokku Municipal election was held on 10 December 1930. In the early morning of 22 March 1931, heavy fire burned in Pakokku and more than 3,000 people were homeless, so Pakokku Fire Brigade was established on 7 April 1931.

When Burma won independence in 1948, Pakokku Hill Tracts Districts was divided into two sections. Pakokku District, Gangaw District, Naga Self-Administered Zone and Chin State became parts of Burma and Nagaland, Mizoram, Tripura, Manipur and Meghalaya became a parts of India.

By the 1947 Constitution of the Union of Burma, Pakokku Province was established with two districts in 1948. They are Pakokku District and Kanpetlet District with 11 townships. Townships are Pakokku, Kanpetlet, Yesagyo, Pauk, Seikphyu, Myaing, Gangaw, Htilin, Saw, Mindat and Matupi. Pakokku was occupied by Communist rebels in 1949 and held until 1955, when it was liberated by government forces. In 1958, the name of Kanpetlet District was changed into Mindat District and Kanpetlet District's Capital was moved to Mindat from Kanpetlet. Province's Capital city was Pakokku.

On 2 March 1962, the military led by General Ne Win took control of Burma through a coup d'état, and the government has been under direct or indirect control by the military. A new constitution of the Socialist Republic of the Union of Burma was adopted in 1974.

By the 1974 Constitution, Pakokku Province was abolished and Pakokku District was added to the Magway Division and Mindat District was added to the Chin State. On 4 April 1998, Pakokku District was divided into two districts. Pakokku, Pauk, Yesagyo, Myaing and Seikphyu became Pakokku District and Gangaw, Saw and Htilin became Gangaw District.

Pakokku Bridge construction was started on 15 December 2009 and ended on 31 December 2011. It was opened on 1 January 2012, and is the longest bridge in Myanmar.

== Notable Places ==
- Thihoshin Pagoda
- Shwe Mote Htaw Pagoda
- Pakokku Bridge

== Climate ==
Located in the powerful rain shadow of the Arakan Mountains, Pakokku has a hot semi-arid climate (Köppen BSh), receiving only about two-fifteenths as much rain as Sittwe at the same latitude on the Bay of Bengal coast. Unlike most monsoonal semi-arid climates, the rainy season is relatively long at around five to six months, while variability and extreme monthly and daily rainfalls are much lower than usual with this type of climate.

Climate data for Pakokku (1981–2010)
Month	Jan	Feb	Mar	Apr	May	Jun	Jul	Aug	Sep	Oct	Nov	Dec	Year
Mean daily maximum °C (°F)	29.1 (84.4)	32.3 (90.1)	36.4 (97.5)	39.0 (102.2)	37.5 (99.5)	35.3 (95.5)	34.9 (94.8)	33.9 (93.0)	33.5 (92.3)	32.7 (90.9)	30.6 (87.1)	28.7 (83.7)	33.7 (92.7)
Mean daily minimum °C (°F)	13.2 (55.8)	14.7 (58.5)	18.6 (65.5)	22.1 (71.8)	24.2 (75.6)	23.6 (74.5)	23.8 (74.8)	23.5 (74.3)	23.0 (73.4)	21.6 (70.9)	18.1 (64.6)	15.1 (59.2)	20.1 (68.2)
Average rainfall mm (inches)	0.9 (0.04)	0.3 (0.01)	3.9 (0.15)	11.1 (0.44)	88.2 (3.47)	89.7 (3.53)	38.2 (1.50)	90.6 (3.57)	117.8 (4.64)	132.0 (5.20)	29.6 (1.17)	4.0 (0.16)	606.3 (23.88)
Source: Norwegian Meteorological Institute

== Transport ==
Pakokku's strategic location in Central Myanmar makes it an important hub for transport of people and goods. The city is connected to other parts of the country and to China, Thailand and India by multiple modes of transportation.

=== Air ===
- Pakokku Airport

=== River ===
The irrawaddy River remains an important arterial route for transporting goods such as farm produce including rice, beans and pulses, cooking oil, pottery, bamboo and teak. Pakokku river port is one of the most important ports, the third largest port in Myanmar after Yangon port and Mandalay port. Pakokku port is a major port of Magway Region.

=== Rail ===
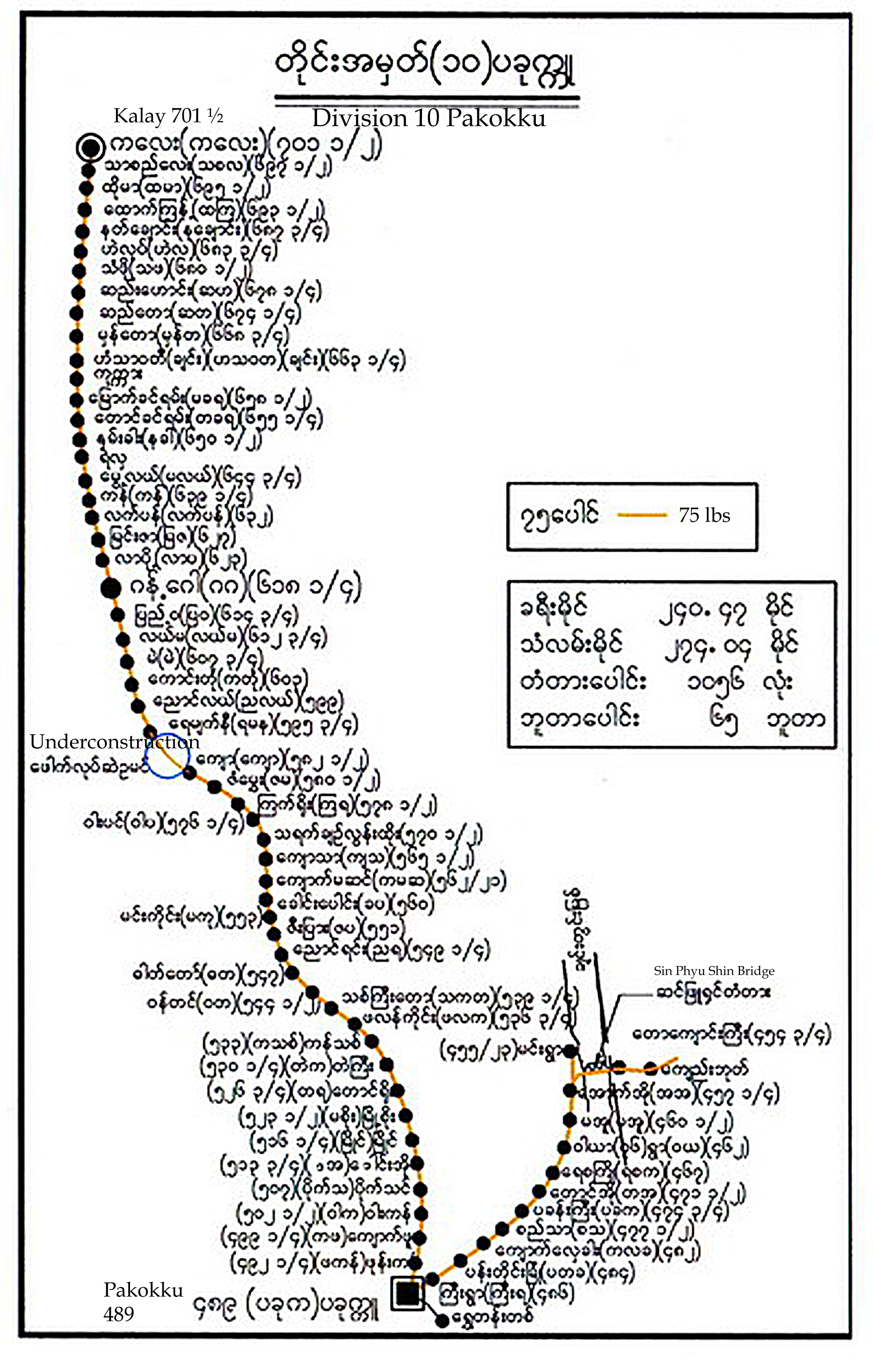
Myanmar Railways station map Division 10 Pakokku

Pakokku Railway Station is the terminus of Myanmar Railways's main rail line from Yangon and the starting point of branch lines to Pyin U Lwin (Maymyo), Monywa, Mandalay, Kalay, Gangaw, and to the south, Bagan, Minbu, Thayet, Pyay and Kyangin.Pakokku Railway Station is the major Railway Station of Magwe Division.

Pakokku does not have an intra-city metro rail system.

=== Roads ===
Pakokku is a part of Myanmar's road network. The highway network includes roads towards:

- Upper Burma and China—

Pakokku—Myingyan-Mandalay-Tagaung–Bhamo–Myitkyina Road, Pakokku-Chaung Oo-Sagaing-Mandalay Road, Pakokku-Mandalay–Lashio–Muse Road (part of Asian Highway)

- Western Burma and India—

Pakokku-Pauk-Saw-Htilin-Gangaw-Kale-Tamu Road, Pakokku-Pauk-Kyaukhtu-Mindat-Matupi Road, Pakokku—Chaung Oo–Monywa–Kalewa–Tamu Road (part of India–Myanmar–Thailand Trilateral Highway)

- Lower Burma and Thailand—

Pakokku-Nyaung-Oo-Chauk-Pyay-Bago-Yangon Road, Pakokku-Meiktila – Nay Pyi Taw – Thaton – Hpa-an – Kawkareik – Myawaddy Road (part of India–Myanmar–Thailand Trilateral Highway)

Most stretches of these highways are one-lane roads in poor condition. Pakokku Bridge is part of the India–Myanmar–Thailand Trilateral Highway and is the longest bridge in Myanmar.

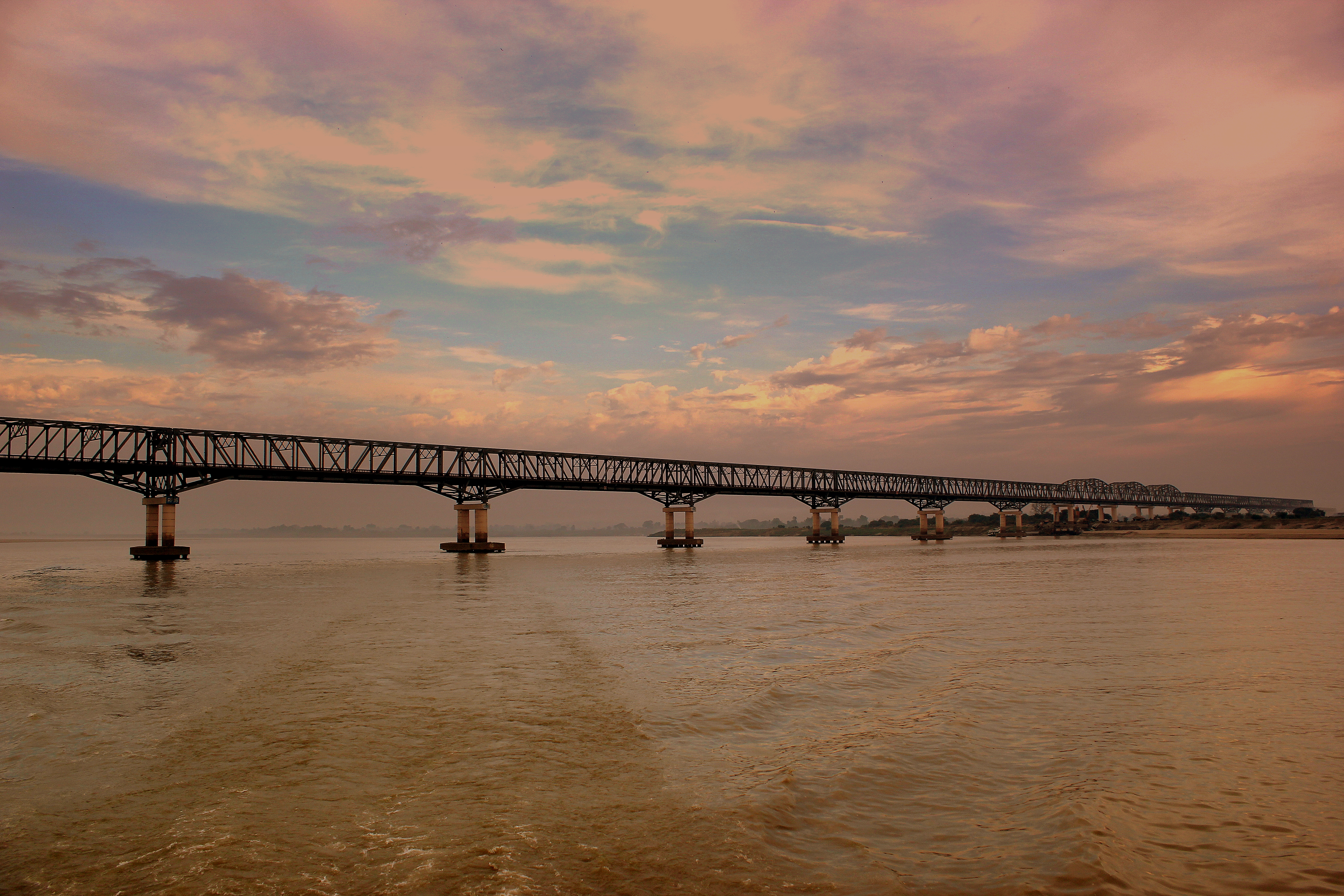

== Education ==
=== List of universities and colleges in Pakokku ===
- Pakokku Teacher Training Degree College (Pakokku Education Degree College)
- Pakokku University
- Computer University, Pakokku
- Technological University, Pakokku
- Nursing College, Pakokku
- East Pali University of Buddhism, Pakokku (Maha Vijara Rama)
- Middle Pali University of Buddhism, Pakokku (Maha Visuta Rama)
- West Pali University of Buddhism, Pakokku (Mandalay tike)

== Sports ==
The 7,000-seat Pakokku Stadium is a multi-use stadium used mostly for football matches.

== List of Ethnic Groups in Pakokku ==
Ethnic Composition in Pakokku Township (Rough Estimate)
Bamar	94.81%
Chin	2.09%
Yaw	1.02%
Mon	0.5%
Rakhine	0.3%
Kayin	0.02%
Shan	0.02%
Kachin	0.01%
Kayah	0.01%
Other groups including Pa'O, Wa, Naga, Lahu, Lisu and Palaung	0.96%

=== Religion ===
Religion in Pakokku (2014)
1. Buddhism (99.0%)
2. Islam (0.50%)
3. Christianity (0.29%)
4. Hinduism (0.16%)
5. Atheist (0.05%)

Buddhism is the practised by the majority of the population. A sizable minority, however, adheres to Islam, Christianity, Atheism, and Hinduism.

Pakokku is the second most important and populated city of Buddhist monks in Myanmar with three Pali university of Buddhism.

== Health care ==
=== Public Hospitals ===
- Pakokku General Hospital
- Pakokku Traditional Medicine Hospital
- Pakokku Women's and Children's Hospital
- Pakokku Sangha Hospital

=== Private Hospitals ===
- ChanMyae Hospital
- ThaPyaeNyo Hospital
