= Cyclone Mocha =

North Indian Ocean cyclone in 2023

Extremely Severe Cyclonic Storm Mocha
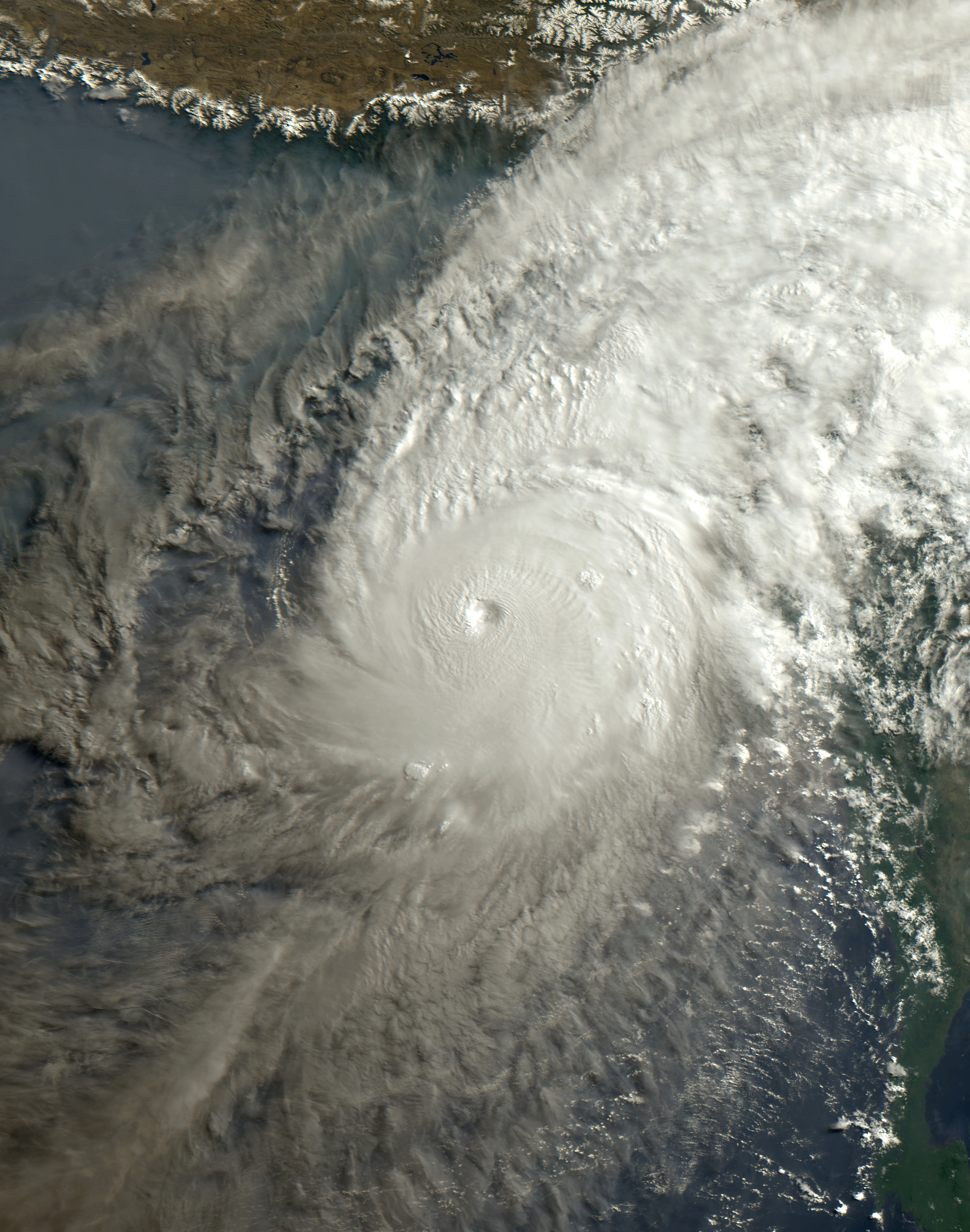
- Mocha at peak intensity approaching Myanmar on 14 May

Meteorological history
- Formed: 9 May 2023
- Dissipated: 15 May 2023

Extremely severe cyclonic storm
- 3-minute sustained (IMD)
- Highest winds: 215 km/h (130 mph)
- Lowest pressure: 938 hPa (mbar); 27.70 inHg

Category 5-equivalent tropical cyclone
- 1-minute sustained (SSHWS/JTWC)
- Highest winds: 270 km/h (165 mph)
- Lowest pressure: 908 hPa (mbar); 26.81 inHg

Overall effects
- Fatalities: 463
- Injuries: 719
- Missing: ≥101
- Damage: $2.24 billion (2023 USD)
- Areas affected: Andaman and Nicobar Islands, India, Sri Lanka, Myanmar, Bangladesh, Yunnan
- IBTrACS /
- Part of the 2023 North Indian Ocean cyclone season

Extremely Severe Cyclonic Storm Mocha (Note: The name Mocha (Arabic: مخا, [muxaː]) was contributed by Yemen and refers to the port city Mokha, where the coffee name comes from, in Arabic.) was a powerful and deadly tropical cyclone in the North Indian Ocean which affected Myanmar and parts of Bangladesh in May 2023. The second depression and the first cyclonic storm of the 2023 North Indian Ocean cyclone season, Mocha originated from a low-pressure area that was first noted by the India Meteorological Department (IMD) on 8 May. After consolidating into a depression, the storm tracked slowly north-northwestward over the Bay of Bengal, and reached extremely severe cyclonic storm intensity. After undergoing an eyewall replacement cycle, Mocha rapidly strengthened, peaking at Category 5-equivalent intensity on 14 May with winds of 270 km/h (165 mph). Mocha slightly weakened before making landfall, and weakening rapidly once inland, dissipated shortly thereafter, as conditions became unfavorable.

Thousands of volunteers assisted citizens of Myanmar and Bangladesh in evacuating as the cyclone approached the international border. Evacuations were also ordered for low-lying areas in Sittwe, Pauktaw, Myebon, Maungdaw, and Buthidaung. In Bangladesh, over 500,000 individuals were ordered to be relocated from coastal areas of the country due to the storm's approach. Officials from the military declared the state of Rakhine a natural disaster area. Several villages in Rakhine State were also damaged by the cyclone. The death toll for Cyclone Mocha varies significantly. ASEAN reported a total of 145 deaths, whereas the National Unity Government of Myanmar (NUG) stated that Cyclone Mocha killed at least 463 people, including three indirect deaths in Bangladesh. The storm also injured 719 people and left 101 others missing. It caused about US$2.24 billion of damage in Myanmar.

Elsewhere, thousands of homes were destroyed in Bangladesh. Twelve people were injured, and the agricultural damage there reached ৳115 million (US$1.07 million), though impact was less severe than initially feared. Seven people in Sri Lanka were indirectly injured and another seven were reported missing due to the cyclone. In India, 5,749 people across over 50 villages were affected, and at least 236 houses were damaged. The remnants of Mocha then contributed to blizzards in China.

== Meteorological history ==
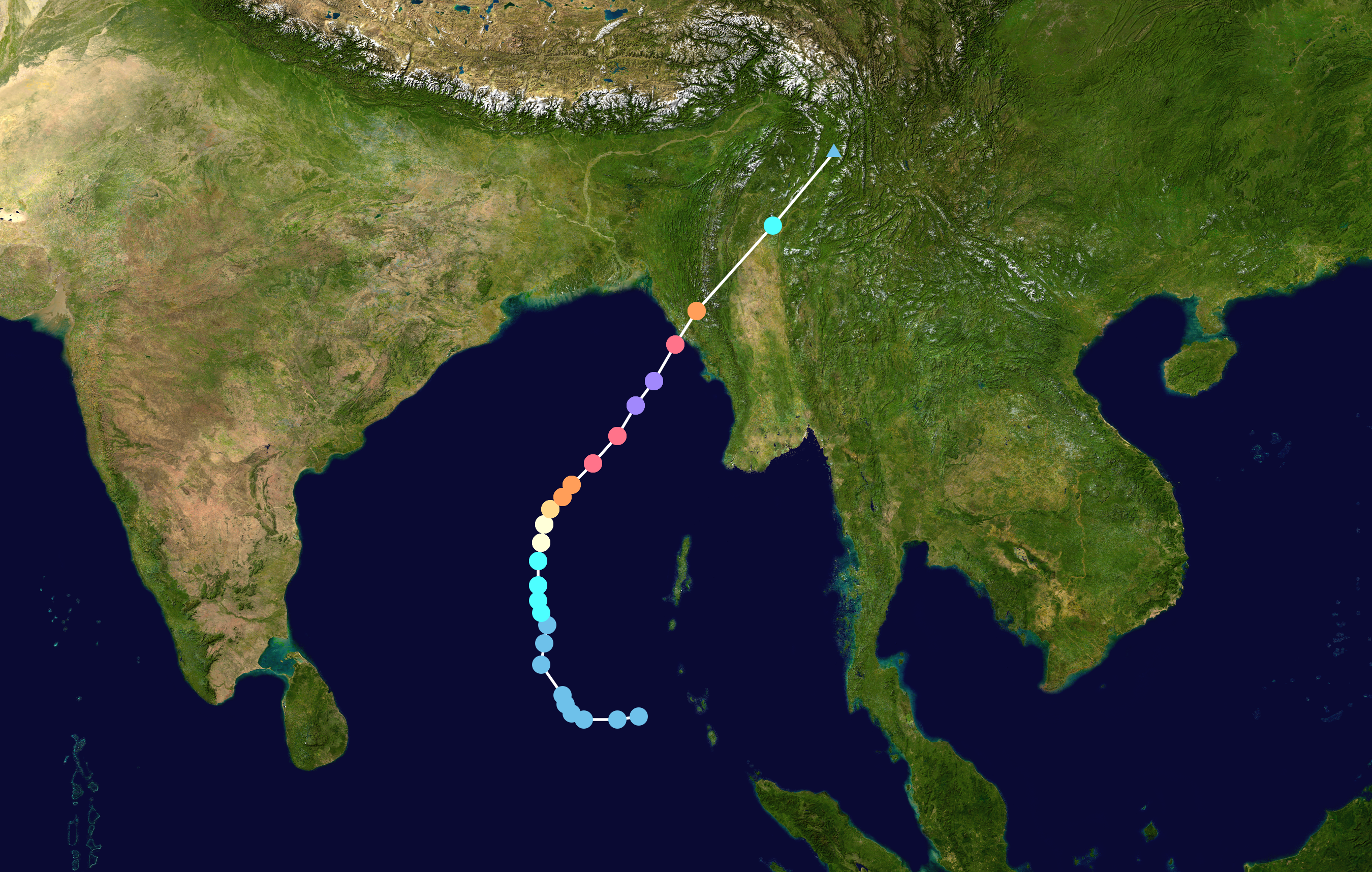
Map plotting the storm's track and intensity, according to the Saffir–Simpson scale Map key Saffir–Simpson scale Tropical depression (≤38 mph, ≤62 km/h) Tropical storm (39–73 mph, 63–118 km/h) Category 1 (74–95 mph, 119–153 km/h) Category 2 (96–110 mph, 154–177 km/h) Category 3 (111–129 mph, 178–208 km/h) Category 4 (130–156 mph, 209–251 km/h) Category 5 (≥157 mph, ≥252 km/h) Unknown Storm type Tropical cyclone Subtropical cyclone Extratropical cyclone, remnant low, tropical disturbance, or monsoon depression

On 2 May, the India Meteorological Department (IMD) began monitoring the potential for tropical cyclone development in the Bay of Bengal. This potential was boosted by the approach of the active phase of the Madden–Julian oscillation, which likewise aided the formation of Cyclone Fabien in the Southern Hemisphere. By 7 May, converging winds were becoming increasingly conducive for the development of a low-pressure area. The following day, both the Joint Typhoon Warning Center (JTWC) and IMD assessed the formation of a weak low-level circulation developed, which was marked as Invest 91B by the former. On 9 May, the IMD upgraded the system to a depression as very intense atmospheric convection consolidated near the center. The JTWC issued a Tropical Cyclone Formation Alert on the system. On 10 May, the IMD upgraded the depression to a deep depression, and subsequently to a cyclonic storm on 11 May. It received the name Mocha. As fragmented rainbands wrapped into the center and thunderstorms continued to burst over the center, the JTWC followed suit in upgrading the system to Tropical Cyclone 01B.

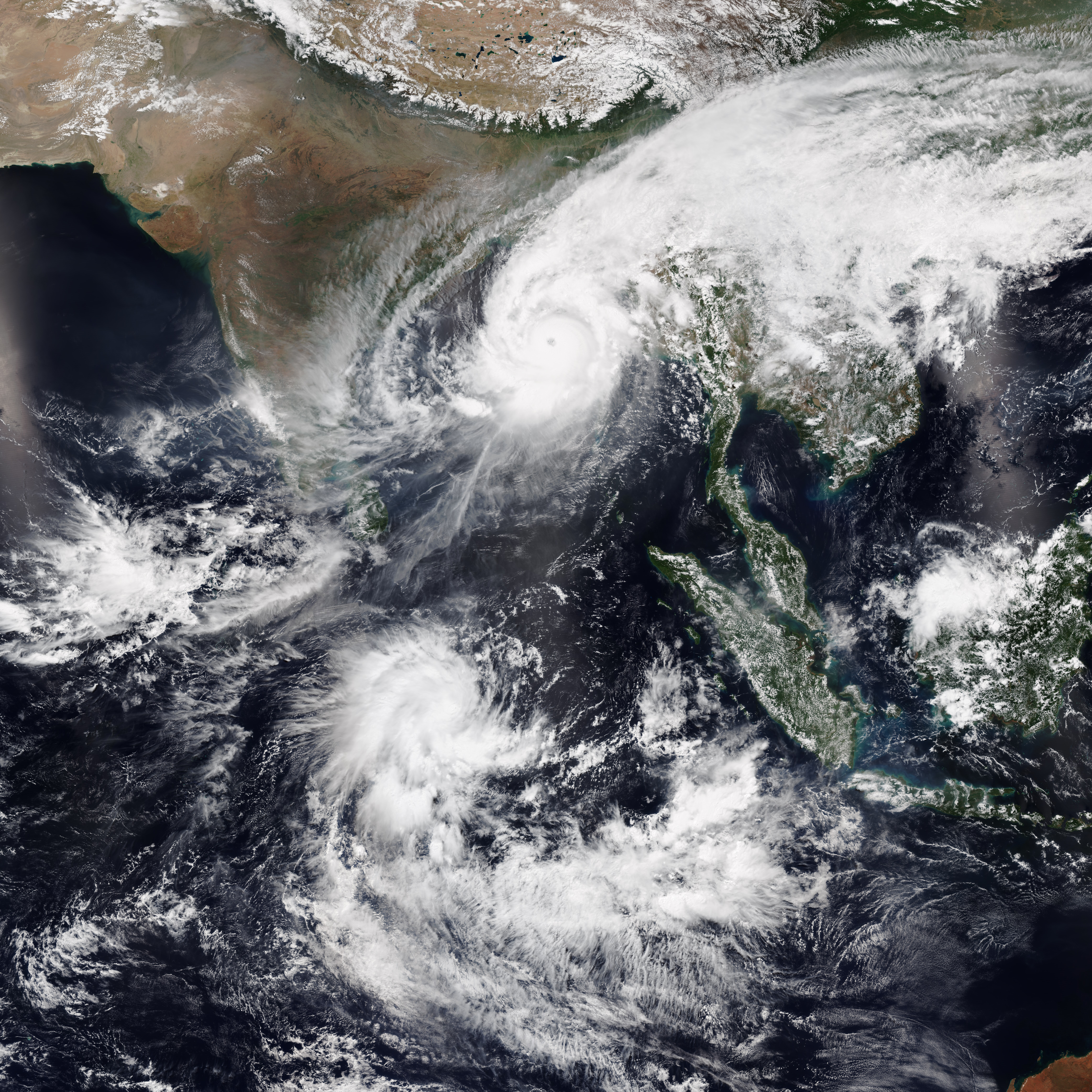
Cyclone Mocha and a tropical disturbance below the equator which would later become Cyclone Fabien on 13 May.

Located on the periphery of an established upper-level ridge, Mocha curved toward the north over the Bay of Bengal while steadily organizing. At 12:00 UTC on 11 May, the IMD upgraded the system to a severe cyclonic storm with winds of 90 km/h (55 mph) as it developed an intense central dense overcast. With time, a ragged eye structure formed and occasionally appeared on satellite imagery. On 12 May, Mocha became a very severe cyclonic storm as an elongated eye became more readily defined. Around this time, Mocha reached 1-minute sustained winds of 165 km/h (105 mph) according to the JTWC, equivalent to Category 2 strength on the Saffir–Simpson hurricane wind scale (SSHWS). While attaining this intensity, the cyclone turned north-northeastward under the influence of an anticyclonic circulation south of Myanmar and a nearby trough. High ocean heat content over the Bay of Bengal fueled a period of rapid intensification, bringing Mocha to extremely severe cyclonic storm status at 18:00 UTC on 12 May. However, this phase was soon interrupted by the onset of an eyewall replacement cycle.

MIM imagery of Cyclone Mocha.

After completing its cycle on 13 May, the eyewall became well-defined, resulting in another period of rapid intensification. Low vertical wind shear and robust outflow facilitated the strengthening, and Mocha reached 1-minute sustained winds of 240 km/h (150 mph), equivalent to Category 4 strength on the SSHWS. Mocha achieved its peak intensity at 18:00 UTC, when the IMD estimated winds of 215 km/h (130 mph), just under super cyclonic storm intensity. Its barometric pressure was assessed at 938 hPa (27.70 inHg). The JTWC initially estimated 1-minute sustained winds of 280 km/h (175 mph) at 00:00 UTC of 14 May, making Mocha a Category 5-equivalent tropical cyclone. However, the agency subsequently revised the estimate to 270 km/h (170 mph).

Mocha was a large storm and had a symmetrical eye about 37 km (20 nmi) wide. Conditions quickly became unfavorable for Mocha upon reaching areas of mid-level wind shear and with dry air beginning to intrude on the northwest side of the core. The eye rapidly eroded as the cloud tops became significantly warmer. Mocha made landfall at 07:00 UTC just north of Sittwe, Myanmar, with 3-minute sustained winds of 215 km/h (135 mph). The JTWC issued its final bulletin on the storm upon landfall and estimated 1-minute sustained winds of 195 km/h (120 mph). Mocha rapidly weakened from Myanmar's rugged terrain as it was downgraded to very severe cyclonic storm intensity at 15:00 UTC. Wind shear also increased and contributed to the weakening. The vorticity in the atmosphere, poleward outflow, and convergence would still maintain Mocha's intensity as a cyclonic storm throughout its deterioration. On 15 May, Mocha weakened into a depression at 00:00 UTC as it tracked east-northeastward. The depression was later marked as a low-pressure area by the IMD at 03:00 UTC, as its center was not well-defined, prompting the discontinuation of advisories on Mocha.

== Effects ==
=== Myanmar ===
==== Preparations ====
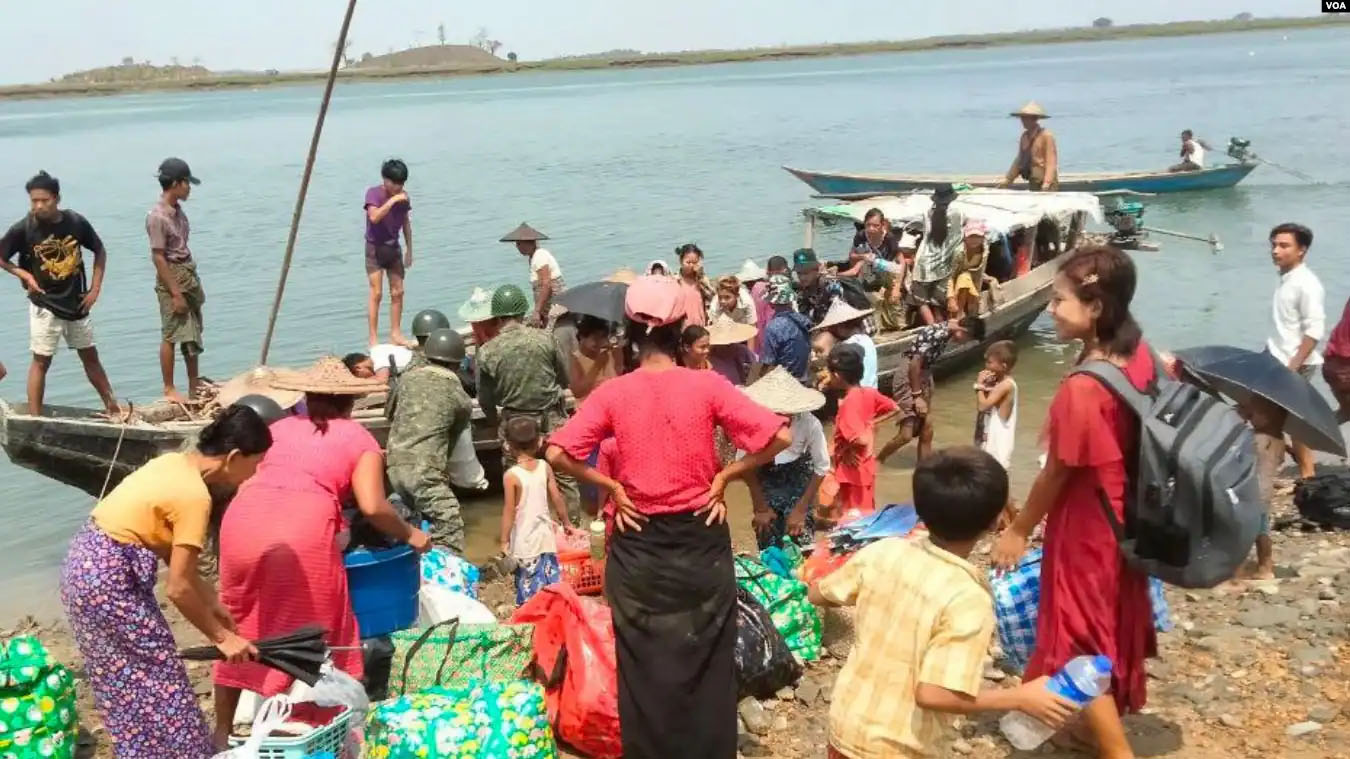
Locals in Rakhine evacuated before the cyclone hit

Local authorities in Rakhine advised residents to evacuate low-lying and coastal areas in Sittwe, Pauktaw, Myebon, Maungdaw, and Buthidaung, and many were already beginning to leave as the storm approached. Communities and aid agencies in Myanmar were preparing for Cyclone Mocha's arrival. The Myanmar Red Cross Society prepared for a major emergency response with the support of the International Federation of Red Cross and Red Crescent Societies (IFRC). More than 78,250 people evacuated from at-risk areas, including 18,800 internally displaced persons in Rakhine. The nation's government preparations for shelter stockpiled to accommodate 100,000 people. Roughly 4,000 people evacuated from Sittwe while 20,000 other residents sought refuge in local shelters.

Large-scale search and rescue teams were placed on standby, consisting of 3,207 personnel equipped with 1,009 land and 242 water vehicles. Dozens of medical personnel and rapid response teams were deployed to Rakhine and Chin. Non-food items for more than 10,000 people were readied. According to ASEAN, Myanmar's government was better-equipped to handle disasters since Cyclone Nargis in 2008. The World Food Programme (WFP) in Myanmar said it was preparing food and relief supplies to support over 400,000 people in Rakhine and nearby areas. According to the United Nations Office for the Coordination of Humanitarian Affairs (OCHA), Mocha was anticipated to reach Myanmar's Rakhine state and northwest region, where six million people require humanitarian assistance and 1.2 million are displaced. The World Health Organization has positioned 500,000 water purification pills in Myanmar, along with additional supplies. The ASEAN Coordinating Centre for Humanitarian Assistance (AHA Centre) warned of the possibility of a "catastrophic disaster" and stated that it was coordinating with Myanmar's military to fly essential supplies from warehouses in Thailand and Malaysia. State TV reported that the military government was prepared to send food, medicine, and medical personnel.

==== Impact ====
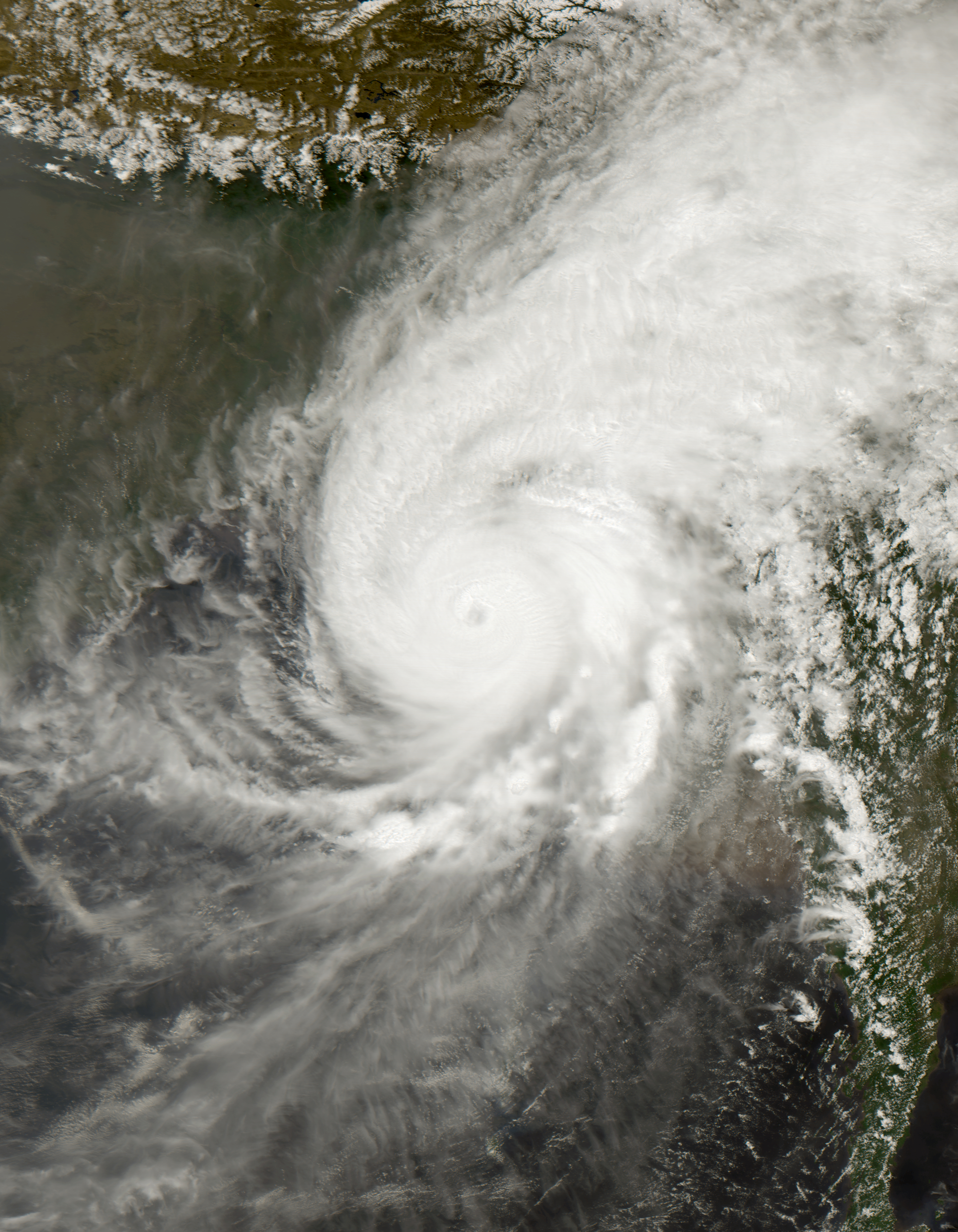
Cyclone Mocha closing in on the coast of Myanmar on 14 May

According to media reports, at least 460 people were killed and hundreds of others were left missing, most of them Rohingya refugees. State media and local officials said at least 145 people died across the country. Over 700 people were also injured. As of 18 May, at least 183,042 houses, 1,770 religious buildings, 1,397 schools, 227 medical facilities, 2 airports and 340 government buildings were destroyed across the country. According to World Bank, Mocha directly caused $2.24 billion of damages in Myanmar, equivalent to 3.4% of the country's GDP in 2021.

The majority of the deaths occurred in Rakhine state. One woman also died in the Salin Creek on 14 May. Several villages from Sittwe, Mrauk-U, Kyauktaw and Minbya Townships of the state were demolished. In Kyawtaw, nearly 90 percent of houses in the town were destroyed. At least 10 villages in Salin Township were flooded due to increased water level of Salin Creek by heavy rains. On Munaung Island, two women died and 1,000 houses were destroyed, including 400 in Pyaeng Taung village. In Chin State, at least 1,136 houses were destroyed in seven townships. Two people were killed by a landslide near Tachilek. A storm surge estimated at 3 to 3.5 m (9.8 to 11.5 ft) impacted coastal communities in Rakhine. Parts of Sittwe were flooded by the surge, leaving streets and homes submerged. Severe winds knocked down a communication tower in Sittwe. Roofs were blown off houses, and billboards flew off buildings in Yangon.

After the cyclone made landfall, communication networks in Rakhine were damaged, according to the UN and local media. The towns of Chauk and Sinphyukyun reported record rainfall totals of 218 millimetres (8.58 in) and 177 mm (6.97 in) respectively, each well above their previous record totals slightly below 100 mm (3.94 in). Officials from the United League of Arakan estimated the damage in Rakhine state were at US$1.5 billion. In terms of flooding, a satellite estimate released on 16 May determined at least 895 km^{2} (346 sq mi) of land was inundated, exposing over 141,000 people. This was in a survey of around 15,160 km^{2} (5,853 sq mi). Following Cyclone Mocha's arrival, up to 16 million people (5.6 million being children) were potentially exposed to the storm's affects, including 1.2 million displaced.

Residents in the affected area told Reuters that up to 100 Rohingya people may have been killed, although the news agency could not verify the fatality count. News site Myanmar Now said hundreds were missing and "feared dead". The UN High Commissioner for Refugees said refugees died from drowning at camps and additional people were missing.

=== Bangladesh ===
UNHCR, the UN refugee agency, stated that "emergency preparations in the camps and on Bhasan Char are underway" in collaboration with the government and local humanitarian organizations. Heavy rains from the cyclone might cause landslides in Chittagong and Cox's Bazar, as well as three other hilly districts: Rangamati, Bandarban, and Khagrachhari, according to authorities in Bangladesh. A half-million people are being evacuated to safer areas in south-eastern Bangladesh ahead of a possibly catastrophic cyclone. The WHO deployed 40 ambulances and 33 mobile medical teams in Cox's Bazar. In addition, Arjun Jain, the UN's principal coordinator for the Rohingya refugee response in Bangladesh, says that there are numerous ambulances and mobile health teams available to support Bangladeshis in need as well as refugees. These teams are highly trained to assist the elderly, children, and the disabled.

The authorities suspended inland river transport in Bangladesh on 13 May and flight operations at Shah Amanat International Airport on 14 May. The Bangladesh government launched a large evacuation campaign to relocate almost 500,000 residents along the country's southern coastlines. By 14 May, approximately 1.27 million people evacuated from Cox's Bazar and over 100,000 from Chittagong.

At least 2,522 houses in Cox's Bazar were destroyed, with another 10,469 others damaged. On St. Martin's Island, 700 houses were destroyed and at least 12 people were injured including one in critical condition. The cyclone impact were less than initially feared as the storm surge was less than anticipated. 500 houses were destroyed in Teknaf. Three people died of stroke while attempting to recover their salt farm on Maheshkhali Island. There and in other upazilas, between 50 and 60 houses were damaged. Agricultural damage in Cox's Bazar District reached ৳115 million (US$1.07 million). Mocha's Gale-force winds began to blow in Bangladesh, accompanied by heavy rainfall. Heavy rains in Bangladesh, according to officials, caused damage in several regions.

=== Sri Lanka ===
Although the impact of the cyclone on Sri Lanka was significantly reduced by its landfall between Bangladesh and Myanmar, seven people were injured, another seven were reported missing, and nearly 2,000 people have been affected in Southern Sri Lanka due to the cyclonic storm's indirect influence. The Sri Lanka Navy (SLN) has deployed approximately 30 relief teams to assist those affected by potential floods.

=== India ===
The India Meteorological Department (IMD) said that the southeast Bay of Bengal region of Tripura, Mizoram, Nagaland, southern Assam, and portions of Manipur were expected to receive "heavy" to "very heavy" rainfall as a result of Cyclone Mocha. The state governments of Tripura, Mizoram, Nagaland, Manipur, and Assam also requested that the disaster management and all other relevant authorities take preventative measures to minimize casualties and property damage. The state of Mizoram, at least 154 houses were destroyed or severely damaged and 82 others and eight refugee camps were partially damaged. A total of 5,749 people in more than 50 villages were affected by Mocha. The city of Kolkata experienced intense rainfall.

=== China ===
The National Meteorological Centre (NMC) of the China Meteorological Administration (CMA) said that due to there was a risk of flash flooding, mudslides and landslides in the southwestern provinces of Yunnan and Tibet especially in the Hengduan and Eastern Himalayan Mountain ranges. In response, the State Flood Control and Drought Relief headquarters activated a Level IV response, the lowest level of response to flooding. In China, blizzards were reported in the northwestern part of Yunnan, arising from the collision of moist air from Mocha's remnants with cold wintery air. Due to the presence of cold air and plenty of moisture from Mocha, snow was able to accumulate, covering roads and other structures.

== Aftermath ==
=== Myanmar ===
The state of Rakhine was declared a natural disaster area by military officials. Communications were cut off from Sittwe. Min Aung Hlaing, Myanmar's junta leader, visited Sittwe to assess the damage and provide donations to residents. Storm damage to communications and road infrastructure, as well as ongoing limitations imposed by Myanmar's military government, made it difficult to obtain information and send help to the affected area, according to non-governmental organizations. The United Nations said that 16 million people were affected by the storm, of which according to UNOCHA, 5.1 million of them live in northwestern Rakhine State.

Malteser International pledged €100,000 and distributed relief goods on 15 May for those affected. The United States provided $250,000 to Bangladesh and Rohingya refugees on 17 May. India launched operation Karuna to support Myanmar.

On 23 May, a supplemental US$122 million Flash Appeal was launched by UNOCHA targeting the needs of 500,000 storm victims. This supplemented an existing humanitarian response plan with a target of 1.1 million people and cost of US$212 million. By mid-June, UN-led humanitarian efforts provided over 110,000 people with shelter and more than 300,000 with food. On 12 June, Myanmar's State Administration Council suspended UN humanitarian aid.

== See also ==
- Weather of 2023
- Tropical cyclones in 2023
- Tropical cyclones in Myanmar
- 1991 Bangladesh cyclone – An extremely deadly and intense tropical cyclone that affected Myanmar and Bangladesh
- 1994 Bangladesh cyclone – Another strong tropical cyclone which made a similar trajectory to Mocha, also affecting Myanmar and Bangladesh.
- May 1997 Bangladesh cyclone – A powerful tropical cyclone that also caused destruction in Myanmar and Bangladesh.
- Cyclone Mala (2006) – A slightly weaker tropical cyclone which had a similar track to Mocha.
- Cyclone Giri (2010) – Another intense tropical cyclone which affected Myanmar and Bangladesh.
- Cyclone Fani (2019) – The strongest tropical cyclone in 1-minute sustained wind speed in the North Indian Ocean.
- Cyclone Amphan (2020) – Most recent Category 5-equivalent tropical cyclone in the North Indian Ocean prior to Mocha.
