= Kyaing =

- Village
- Location in Burma.
- Coordinates: 21°45′49″N 94°10′38″E
- Country: Burma
- Region: Magway Region
- District: Gangaw
- Township: Hteelin
- Time zone: UTC+6.30 (MST)

Kyaing is a village in Tilin Township, Gangaw District, in the north-western part of the Magway Region in Myanmar. Kyaing lies on the right (western) bank of the Ywa Chaung tributary of the Maw River.
