= Yaw people =

Yaw
‌ယော

Total population
- 250,000

Regions with significant populations
- Gangaw District, Magway Division, Burma

Languages
- Yaw dialect of the Burmese language

Religion
- Theravada Buddhism

Related ethnic groups
- Bamar, Arakanese, Intha, Danu, Taungyo

The Yaw people (Burmese: ယောလူမျိုး) live in Gangaw District, Burma and Pakokku District number about 250,000 people. They speak the Yaw dialect of the Burmese language.
