= U Khe =

19th-century Burmese court official under King Mindon

Maha Minhla Shwe Taung U Khe
- ဦးခဲ

Minister of Royal Steward
- In office 1853–unknown
- Monarch: Mindon Min

Personal details
- Born: Yezagyo, Konbaung Burma
- Occupation: Royal official
- Known for: Resemblance to King Mindon, palace service

U Khe (Burmese: ဦးခဲ) was a court official who served as Sataw wun (minister of royal steward) during the Konbaung dynasty under King Mindon Min (r. 1853–1878). He held the title Maha Minhla Shwe Taung and was responsible for overseeing royal kitchen affairs, including the preparation and management of meals for the royal family.

Originally from Yezagyo, U Khe entered palace service through the patronage of U Hmine, the Lord of Yezagyo, and became one of King Mindon's trusted attendants. He received the appanage in fief of Yezagyo. According to the royal order of 16 January 1873, U Khe was granted the appanage of several irrigated paddy lands in the nine southern districts.

U Khe was notably recognized for his physical resemblance to King Mindon, which led to confusion among palace officials and foreign envoys. During the 1855 visit of British envoy Major Arthur Phayre to Amarapura, U Khe was initially mistaken for the king. To prevent further misunderstandings, Kinwun Mingyi U Kaung instructed U Khe to forgo a beard and carry a walking stick in public. He also funded the construction of the Aung Mye Thaya Monastery in Yezagyo in 1869.
