= Sinphyukyun =

- Town
- Interactive map of Sinphyukyun
- Coordinates: 20.664°N 94.693°E
- Country: Myanmar
- Region: Magway Region
- District: Minbu District
- Township: Salin Township

Area
  - Total: 0.19 sq mi (0.49 km^{2})
- Elevation: 169 ft (52 m)

Population (2023)
  - Total: 6,670
  - Density: 35,000/sq mi (14,000/km^{2})
- Time zone: UTC+6:30 (MMT)

Sinphyukyun (Burmese: ဆင်ဖြူကျွန်းမြို့) is a town in Salin Township in Minbu District, Magway Region, Myanmar. The town is divided into 3 urban wards. The town is located on the south bank of the Salin River near its confluence with the Irrawaddy River six miles northeast of the township capital of Salin. The town was elevated to town status by Legal Notification 356/2015 in 2015.

== History ==
The town was first settled as a port village near the confluence of the two rivers. During the reign of Bagyidaw around the year 1819, the island that the town sits on became known for having several white elephants and was named Sinphyukyun, literally meaning White Elephant Island.

The town was heavily damaged by floods after Cyclone Mocha in 2023 with flooding from the Salin River unexpectedly catching residents in the area off guard as it had been dry prior to the storm.

During the ongoing Myanmar civil war, the People's Defence Force began an offensive to take the town by attacking positions on the bridge from the north and to the town's police station on 23 December 2025. A related resistance force called the Bamar Army warned residents not to go near polling stations in the town a few days later on 27 December, as the Tatmadaw's elections went underway. The National Unity Government of Myanmar would also announce that it had attacked regime convoys, outposts and began a siege of Sinphyukyun on the 23rd.

== Notable people ==
The author Sinphyukyun Aung Thein was born in then Sinphyukyun village, learning about literature from refugees escaping the cities during the Second World War. He wrote poetry and novels featuring rural society and commentary on farm life.
