= Yesagyo =

Yesagyo ရေစကြိုမြို့
- Town
- Location in Burma
- Coordinates: 21°38′00″N 95°14′29″E
- Country: Myanmar
- Region: Magway Region
- District: Pakokku District
- Township: Yesagyo Township

Population (2014 Cenus)
  - Total: 23,603
- Time zone: UTC+6.30 (MST)

Yesagyo (Burmese: ရေစကြိုမြို့) is a town in the Magway Division in Myanmar. It is situated on the Chindwin River, near the site where it flows into Irrawaddy River. It is the principal town and administrative seat of Yesagyo Township.Yesagyo is a second biggest city of Pakokku District.

The town is served by the Chaung-U to Pakokku railway.
