= Pakokku Township =

Pakokku Township ပခုက္ကူ မြို့နယ်
- Township
- Location in Pakokku district

- Location in Myanmar
- Coordinates: 21°19′N 94°56′E
- Country: Myanmar
- Division: Magway Division
- District: Pakokku
- Capital: Pakokku

Population
  - Total: 463,108
- Time zone: UTC+6:30 (MMT)

Pakokku Township (Burmese: ပခုက္ကူ မြို့နယ်) is a township of Pakokku District in Magway Division of Myanmar. The principal town and administrative seat is Pakokku. The township has its eastern and southeastern border along the Irrawaddy where its principal town, Pakokku, is a port. The Yaw River forms the township's southwest border. There is a commercial airport at Lanywa (Lan).

== Communities ==
Among the towns and villages in Pakokku Township are: Anauktaw, Hmaikbingon, Kandaw, Kin, Lanywa (Lan), Myitche and Shwegyaung (Shwe Chaung).

== Borders ==
Pakokku Township is bordered by:

- Myaing Township, to the north,
- Yesagyo Township, to the northeast,
- Nyaung-U Township, to the southeast,
- Seikphyu Township, to the southwest, and
- Pauk Township, to the northwest.
