= Pauk, Myanmar =

Pauk ပေါက်
- Town
- Location in Burma
- Coordinates: 21°27′N 94°28′E
- Country: Myanmar
- Region: Magway Region
- District: Pakokku District
- Township: Pauk Township
- Time zone: UTC+6.30 (MST)

Pauk (Burmese: ပေါက်) is a town in Pauk Township, Pakokku District, Magway Region, in north-west Myanmar. It is the administrative center for Pauk Township. Pauk is located on the western bank of the Kyaw River just above its intersection with the Yaw River.

The current town was founded in 1840. The local airport ICAO designation is VYPK (IATA code: PAU).
