= Wetthegan Wildlife Sanctuary =

Wetlands in Myanmar

- ဝက်သည်းကန်ငှက်ဘေးမဲ့တေ
- IUCN category IV (habitat/species management area)
- Location within Myanmar
- Location: Magway Region, Salin Township, Myanmar
- Nearest city: Salin
- Coordinates: 20°34′00″N 94°38′00″E
- Area: 3.72 km^{2} (1.44 sq mi)
- Established: 1939
- Visitors: 6000 (in 2015)
- Governing body: Township Forest Department

Wetthegan Wildlife Sanctuary (Burmese: ဝက်သည်းကန်ငှက်ဘေးမဲ့တေ) is a protected area in Myanmar's Magway Region with an area of 4.4 km^{2} (1.7 sq mi) at an elevation of 60–90 m (200–300 ft). It was established in 1939. The sanctuary's 2 km^{2} (0.77 sq mi) lake and surrounding marshland provide habitat for waterfowl and freshwater fish. It is located about 16 km (9.9 mi) west of the Irrawaddy River close to the city of Salin in Salin Township. It receives south-west monsoon rains of about 723 mm (28.5 in) per year from June to August. It is one of four protected wetlands in the country.

== History ==
The sanctuary was notified in September 1939 under the name of 'Weltigan Wild Life Sanctuary' with an area of 4.4 km^{2} (1.7 sq mi) foremost for the protection of waterfowl. It consisted of a lake and marshland. Local people were allowed to graze their cattle, collect grass, fruits and lotus leaves. Birds and fish were poached during the Japanese occupation of Burma. By the early 1950s, the area was partly rehabilitated. Today, it is governed by the Township Forest Department and does not receive a budget for conservation activities.

== Biodiversity ==
Wetthegan Wildlife Sanctuary comprises a lake of about 2 km^{2} (0.77 sq mi) surrounded by marshes, where 22 aquatic plant species were recorded. These include Typha, Eichhornia, Sesbania, Nymphaea and Boottia species. Medicinal plants comprise 80 species.

Birds recorded comprise 130 species, with ducks and waders predominating between November and February. Waterfowl include lesser whistling duck (Dendrocygna javanica), ferruginous pochard (Aythya nyroca), bar-headed goose (Anser indicus) and pheasant-tailed jacana (Hydrophasianus chirurgus). Also recorded were hooded treepie (Crypsirina cucullata), Ayeyarwady bulbul (Pycnonotus blanfordi), common myna (Acridotheres tristis), white-throated babbler (Argya gularis), Asian palm swift (Cypsiurus balasiensis). Little grebe (Tachybaptus ruficollis), cinnamon bittern (Ixobrychus cinnamomeus), cattle egret (Bubulcus ibis), knob-billed duck (Sarkidiornis melanotos), cotton pygmy goose (Nettapus coromandelianus), Indian spot-billed duck (Anas poecilorhyncha), Western swamphen (Porphyrio porphyrio), black-winged stilt (Himantopus himantopus) and little ringed plover (Charadrius dubius) were also sighted. Indian black turtle (Melanochelys trijuga), Indian flapshell turtle (Lissemys punctata) and Asiatic softshell turtle (Amyda cartilaginea) live in the lake.
