= Pakokku University =

- ပခုက္ကူတက္ကသိုလ်
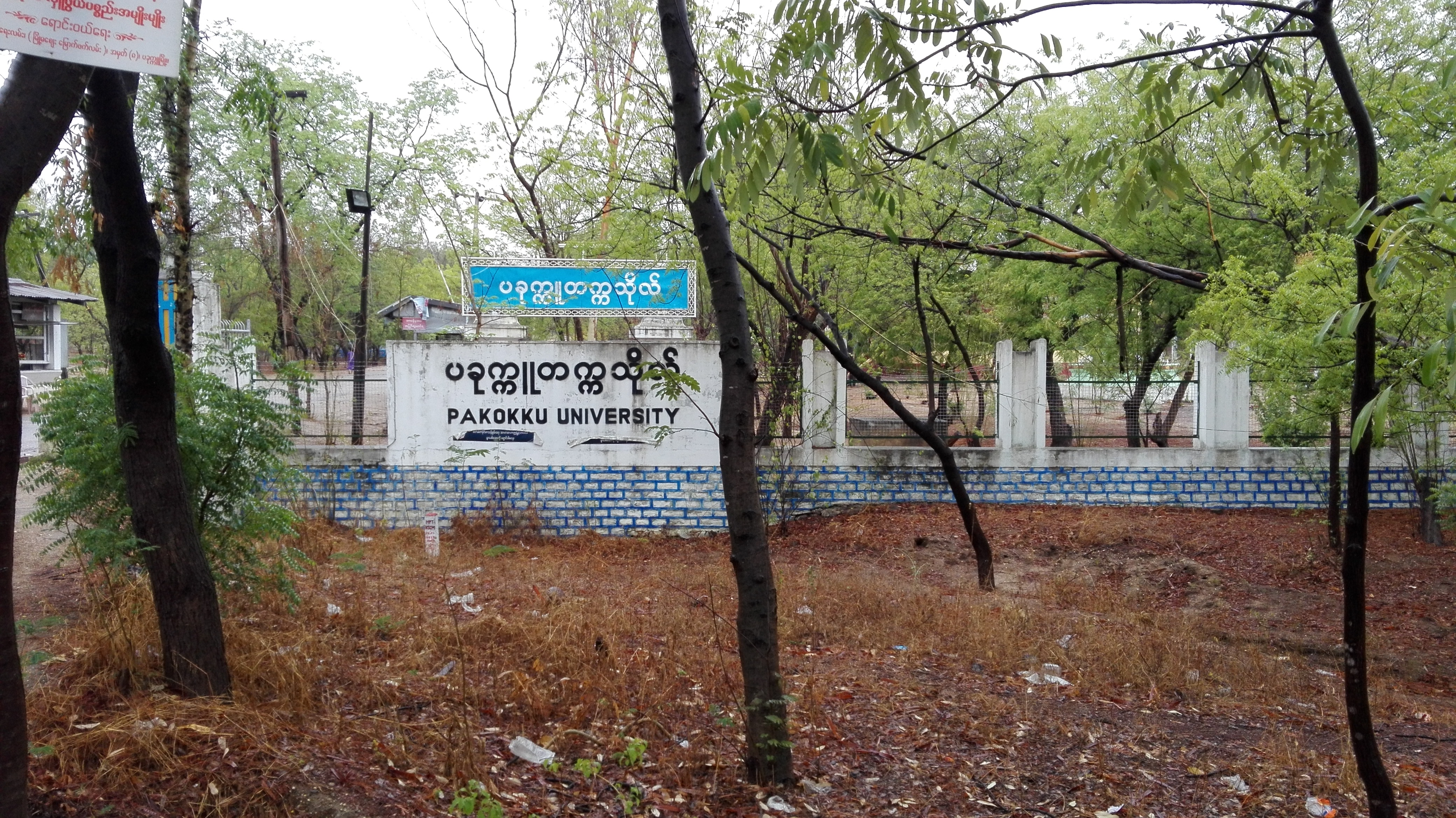
- University of Pakokku.
- Established: 2001; 25 years ago
- Rector: Dr. Tin Htun Aung
- Location: Pakokku, Magway Region, Myanmar; 21°21′1″N 95°4′16″E

Pakokku University is a public university located in Pakokku, Magway Region, central Myanmar. The university offers bachelor's degree programs in common liberal arts and sciences disciplines.

The university has one main building, where graduation ceremonies are held.

== Degrees ==
- Bachelor of Arts (BA)
- Bachelor of Science (B.Sc)
- Master of Arts (MA)
- Master of Science (M.Sc)

== Departments ==
- Department of Myanmar
- Department of English
- Department of Physics
- Department of History and Myanmar Culture
- Department of Philosophy
- Department of Law
- Department of Geography and Environmental Studies
- Department of Oriental Studies
- Department of Mathematics
- Department of Chemistry
- Department of Biochemistry
- Department of Zoology
- Department of Botany
- Department of Geology
- Department of Literary Writing
- Department of Economics
