= Salin Township =

Salin Township စလင်းမြို့နယ်
- Township
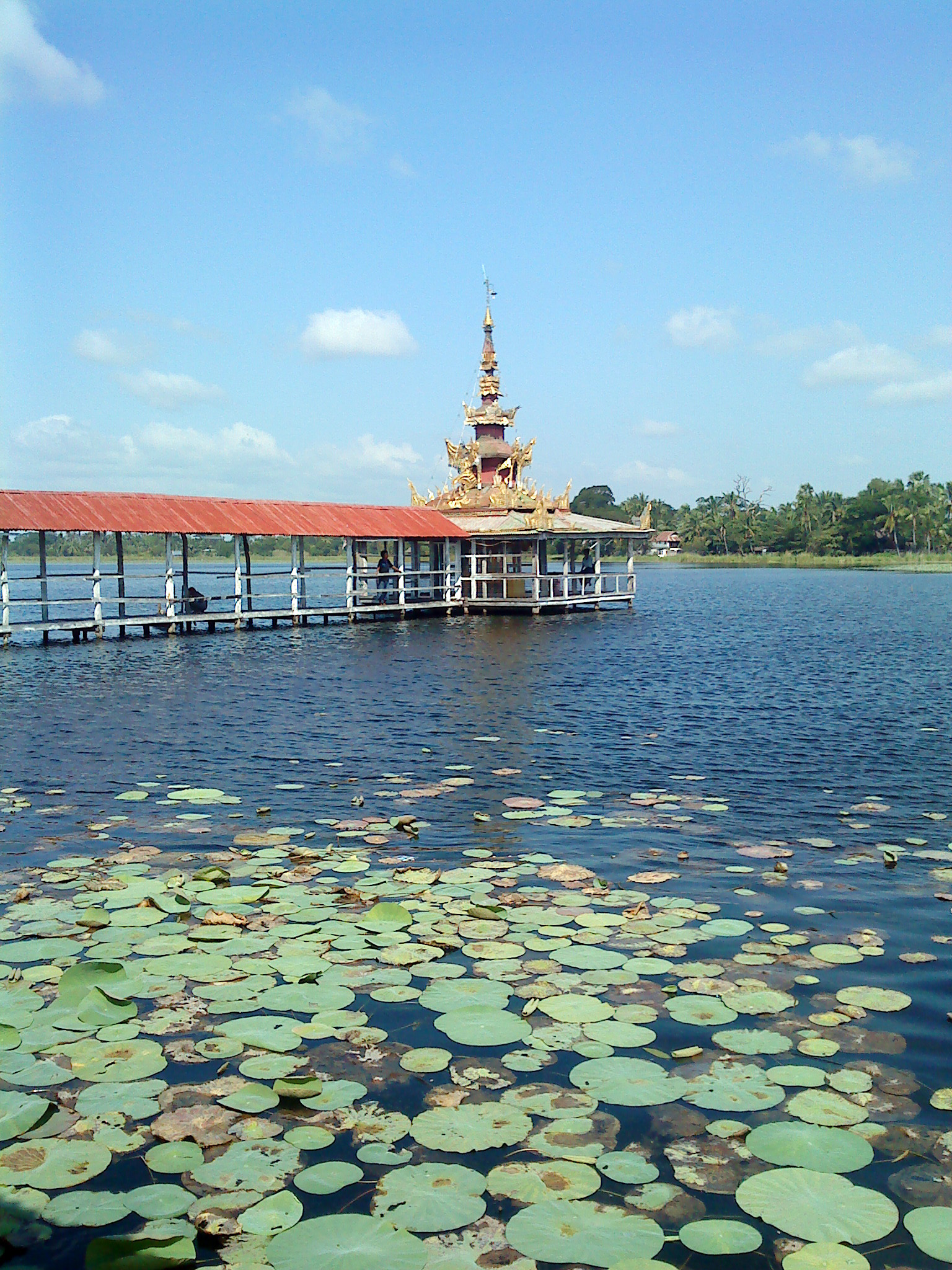
- Wetthegan Wildlife Sanctuary, Salin Township

- Location in Minbu district
- Coordinates: 20°34′38″N 94°39′34″E
- Country: Myanmar
- Region: Magway Region
- District: Minbu District

Area
  - Total: 893.14 sq mi (2,313.2 km^{2})
- Elevation: 216.19 ft (65.89 m)
- Highest elevation: 2,083 ft (635 m)
- Lowest elevation: 60 ft (18 m)

Population (2023)
  - Total: 259,206
  - Density: 290.22/sq mi (112.05/km^{2})
- Time zone: UTC+6:30 (MMT)

Salin Township (Burmese: စလင်းမြို့နယ်) is a township of Minbu District in northern Magway Region, central Myanmar. Salin Township is bordered by Saw Township and Seikphyu Township to the north, Chauk and Yenangyaung Township to the east, Pwintbyu Township to the south and Sidoktaya Township to the west. The principal town is Salin and the township contains one other town- Sinphyukyun. The township is divided into 11 urban wards in those two towns and 417 villages grouped into 99 village tracts.

== History ==
The town of Salin was established in 1194 by Sithu II during the Bagan Kingdom. The town's oldest stupas were also built at the same time, including the Pyidaw Oo Pagoda and a shrine to the nat (deity) Shin Saw Wa on the Wetthe Lake just west of the town. The town was destroyed during the turmoil following the collapse of the Bagan Kingdom but was rebuilt in its final establishment in 1370. The 14th century walls lasted until 1887.

Prior to colonisation, the Salin area has been historically home to many hereditary noble families, with lesser nobles controlling various rural farmlands in the wider Minbu District. The title associated with Salin was one of six non-royal landowner titles notable for each coming with more than 100,000 acres of land and the farmers who cultivated lands for these nobles were said to have gained more merit. "Salin" itself eventually became a title for nobles who used it as an honorific since the 17th century. The economy of this period relied heavily on peasants entering monetary bondage contracts with the nobles of Salin called Thet-Kayits. The peasants performed household or agricultural work to payoff their indentured servitude. These contracts were regulated towards the late Konbaung Dynasty with time limits placed on the contract of servitude by the reign of Mindon Min. Mindon Min, further gave his most beloved daughter control of tax-rich Salin district as a myosa. During British rule in Burma, Salin Township was established as part of the Magway Division. The famous writer Theippan Maung Wa worked for a period as a civil servant in Salin Township.

The township has remained as such to this day. In 1972, the township was officially redivided into 6 new urban wards and 102 village tracts. In March 2015, the town of Sinphyukyun was established by Legal Notification 356/2015 within the township. The township was last reorganised in 2018 to bring the number of village tracts down to the modern 99 tracts.

== Geography ==
Salin Township lies along the Irrawaddy River in central Myanmar's Dry Zone region. It is predominantly a low-lying part of the Irrawaddy valley with the elevation rising towards its west where some hills can be found. The most prominent mountain is Mt. Nwama in the township's west, but the highest point, Mt. Yayyo, lies at the tripoint with Saw Township and Seikphyu Township in the north at an elevation of 2,083 feet (635 m). The Salin River flows within the township for 32 miles (51 km) eastwards into the Irrawaddy River, which flows from north to south. There are several populated riverine islands within the township, particularly in the east.

The climate of the township is described as dry and hot. The temperature in the township ranges from a high of 44°C to a low of 8.3°C. The area receives an average of 22.9 inches (58 cm) of rain over 46 days a year. 25.14% of the township is forested with 17.79% of the township falling within protected forests. The township has Tectona teak, catechu, htanaung, karoi and bamboo trees. It is home to fauna including muntjac, wild boars, gibbons and other smaller animals. The Wetthegan Wildlife Sanctuary, one of four protected weltands in Myanmar is located in the township where a lower-lying area of about 1.7 square miles (4.4 km^{2}) creates a marshland environment alongside the eponymous Wetthe Lake that receives 28.5 inches (72 cm) of rain each year. The wetlands host the near-threatened Ferruginous duck.

== Demographics ==
Historical Population
Year	SalinTownship	±%
2014	236,033	—
2018	254,012	+7.6%
2019	255,611	+0.6%
2022	258,068	+1.0%
2023	259,206	+0.4%
Source: Ministry of Labor, Immigration, and Population and General Administration Department data

In 2014, the township had 236,033 people. The township was very rural with only 5.2% of the population living in the then-singular town of Salin. The mean household size was 4.2 persons with the median age being 29.1 years.

In 2019, the township had 255,611 people. The township was relatively homogenous. 99.7% of the population professed Buddhism as their religion and 99.8% of the population was of the Bamar ethnicity. In 2023, the township had only grown to 259,206 people.

== Economy ==
The primary industry of Salin Township is agriculture with a significant animal husbandry sector as well. The primary crops produced are rice, cotton, sunflowers, sesame and green beans. The main animals produced are beef, pork and chicken with some fish farms as well. Its central location in Magway connects it to various other markets with road and communications infrastructure. 30% of the township's land area is dedicated to farming, with much of the remaining area being undeveloped land or protected lands. There are 15 dams within the township for irrigation along with the Tanyaung Reservoir, which is operated electrically.

In 2014, the dominant material for housing stock was bamboo with thatch roofing and only 15.7% of the population relied on electricity as their main source of lighting. By 2024, the electrification rate had increased to 17.2%. Solar powered home systems have become an effective means for rural electrification in the township with rural residents not finding the expense of the systems' installations as a prohibitive cost. These systems power basic personal needs such as mobile phone charging. However, significant use of solar power for energy-intensive applications like irrigation continue to be out of reach.
