= Saw, Myanmar =

Saw ဆော Hsaw
- Township
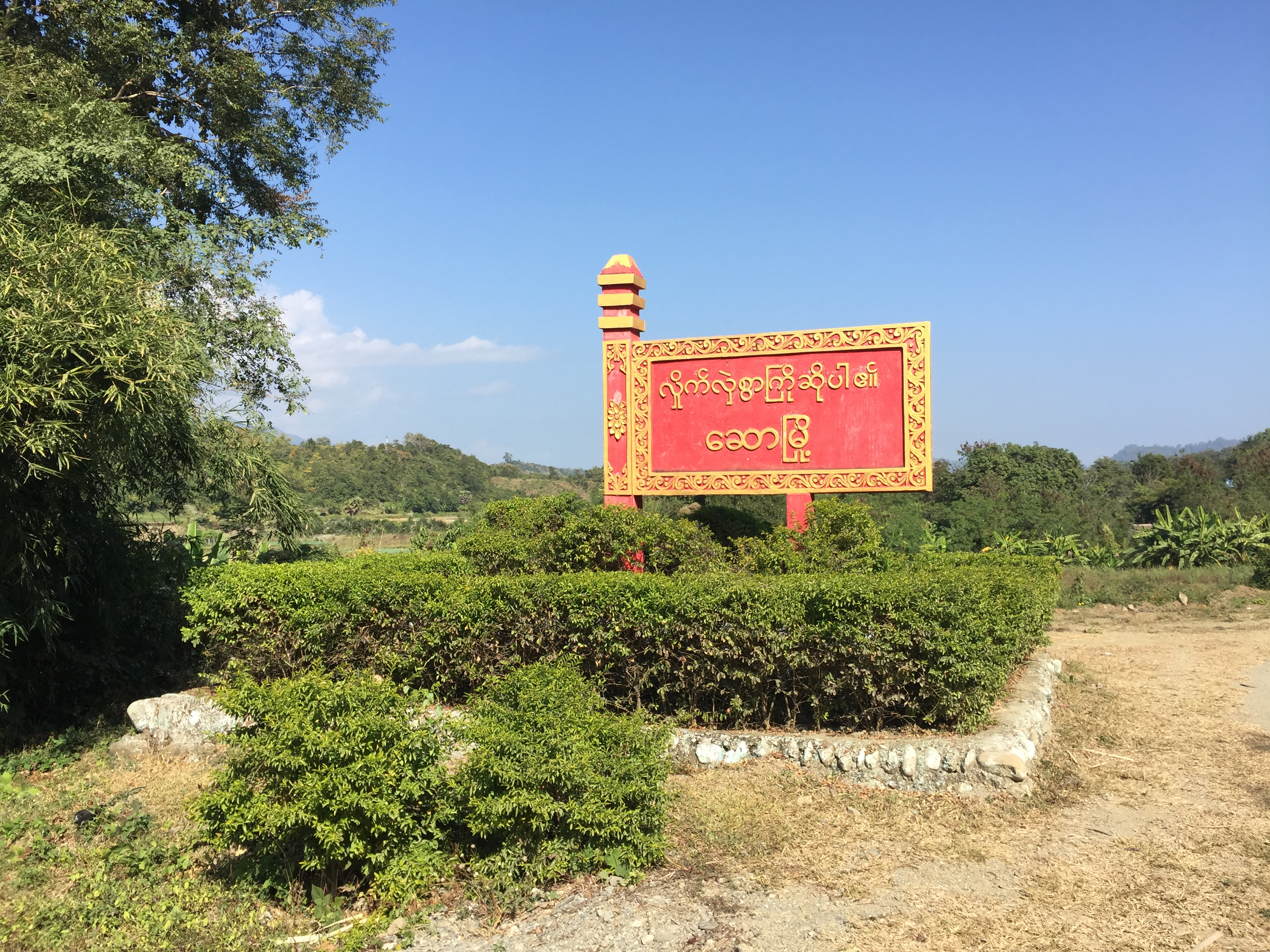

- Location in Burma
- Coordinates: 21°09′N 94°09′E
- Country: Burma
- Region: Magway Region
- District: Gangaw District
- Township: Saw Township
- Time zone: UTC+6.30 (MST)

Saw (Burmese: ဆောမြို့, Burmese pronunciation: [sʰɔ́ mjo̰]) is a town of Saw Township in Gangaw District in the Magway Division in Burma.
