= Yesagyo Township =

- Township
- Location in Pakokku district

- Location in Myanmar
- Coordinates: 21°35′N 95°11′E
- Country: Myanmar
- Region: Magway
- District: Pakokku District
- Time zone: UTC+6:30 (MMT)
- Area code: 062

Yesagyo Township (Yaesagyo Township) is a township of Pakokku District in the Magway Region of central Myanmar. The principal town and administrative seat is Yesagyo.

The township is served by the Chaung-U to Pakokku railway.

== Borders ==
Yesagyo is the easternmost township of Magway Region. The Chindwin River and then the Irradwaddy form the eastern boundary of the township except for a small area on the eastern side of the Chindwin directly across from the town of Yesagyo, which area was formerly an island in the Chindwin. Yesagyo Township is bounded by the following townships:

- Salingyi Township, Sagaing region, to the north;
- Chaung-U Township and Myaung Township of Sagaing Region, to the northeast;
- Myingyan Township and Taungtha Township of Mandalay Region to the southeast;
- Pakokku Township to the southwest; and
- Myaing Township to the west.

== Sights ==
The wooden Pakhangyi Monastery on brick foundations was constructed by King Mindon in 1886 and restored in 1992. In 1992 the Pakhangyi Archaeological Museum was opened there. In 1996 Burma applied for World Heritage Site status for the site.
