= Pauk Township =

Pauk Township ပေါက်မြို့နယ်
- Township
- Location in Pakokku district

- Location within Myanmar
- Coordinates: 21°27′N 94°28′E
- Country: Myanmar
- Region: Magway Region
- District: Pakokku District
- Capital: Pauk

Area
  - Total: 960.00000 sq mi (2,486.38859 km^{2})
- Elevation: 527.93 ft (160.91 m)

Population (2019)
  - Total: 200,120
  - Density: 208.46/sq mi (80.486/km^{2})
- Time zone: UTC+6:30 (MMT)

Pauk Township (Burmese: ပေါက်မြို့နယ်) is a township of Pakokku District in Magway Division of Myanmar. The principal town and administrative seat is Pauk.

The township lies between 21° 10' and 21° 49' north latitude and 94° 18' and 94° 44' east longitude. It has an area of 1,490 sq.mi. The principal river is the Kyaw River along the banks of which rice is grown.

The Burmese government has denied that chemical weapons are produced at the military facility there.

== Borders ==
Pauk Township is bordered by:

- Seikphyu Township, to the south,
- Saw Township, to the west,
- Tilin Township, to the northwest,
- Gangaw Township and Pale Township of Sagaing Division, to the north,
- Myaing Township, to the east, and
- Pakokku Township, to the southeast.
