= Technological University, Pakokku =

Higher education institute in Magway Region, Myanmar

Coordinates: 21°25′59″N 95°08′09″E

Technological University (Pakokku)
- နည်းပညာတက္ကသိုလ် (ပခုက္ကူ)
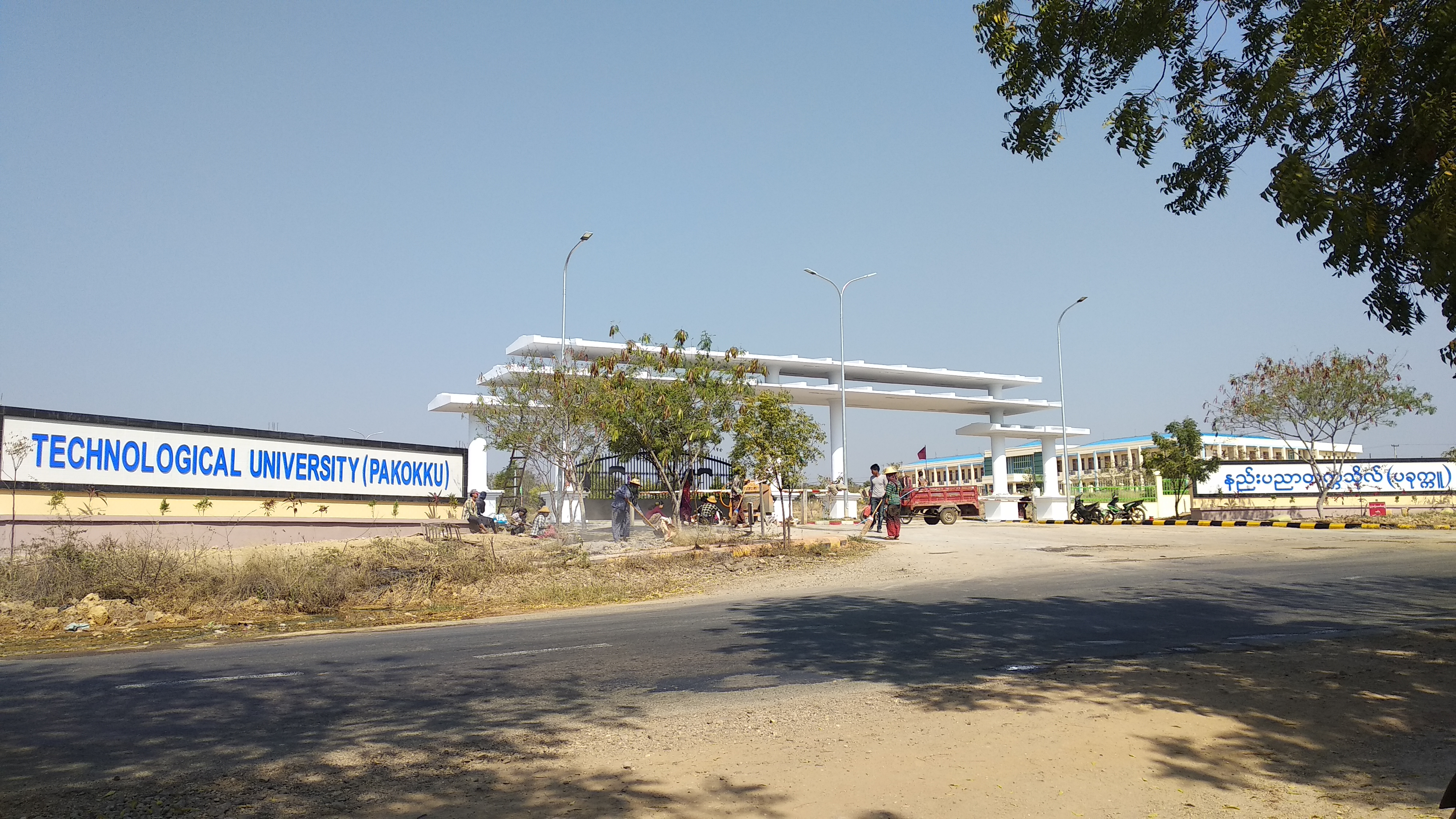
- Type: Public
- Established: 27 December 1999; 26 years ago
- Affiliations: Ministry of Education (Science and Technology)
- Location: Pakokku, Magway Region, Myanmar
- Website: tupku.edu.mm

Technological University, Pakokku is a public university situated along the Pakokku–Yesagyo road, in Magway Region, Myanmar. It is about 8 miles and 4 furlongs from Pakokku. Kyauk Hlae Khar village is situated to the north, Pantinechone village to the south and Oakkan village to the west. The university covers 100.32 acres (40.60 ha).

The university was opened as G.T.I (Government Technological Institute) on 27 December 1999. It was promoted to GTC (Government Technological College) on 20 October 2002. It was promoted to Technological University on 20 January 2007.

== Departments ==
- Cilvil Engineering Department
- Electronic and Communication Department
- Electrical Power Engineering Department
- Mechanical Engineering Department
- Academic Department

== Program ==
The university offers Bachelor of Engineering and Bachelor of Technology degrees.

== See also ==
- Technological University, Magway
- List of Technological Universities in Myanmar
