= Pakokku Airport =

Pakokku Airport ပခုက္ကူ အပြည်ပြည်ဆိုင်ရာလေဆိပ်
- IATA: PKK; ICAO: VYPU

Summary
- Location: Pakokku, Myanmar
- Coordinates: 21.4074°N 95.1131248°E
- Interactive map of Pakokku Airport

Runways
Direction	Length		Surface
Direction	ft	m	Surface
18/36	8,530 ft	2,600 m	Asphalt / Concrete

Pakokku Airport (IATA: PKK, ICAO: VYPU) is an airport in Pakokku, Myanmar, administered by the Ministry of Transportation. It is a regional airport in Magway Division. Due to its proximity to Bagan, a UNESCO World Heritage site, the Ministry's Department of Civil Aviation has plans to upgrade Pakokku Airport to an international airport.

== Airlines and destinations ==
Airlines	Destinations
Myanmar National Airlines	Mandalay
