= Anawrahta Bridge =

Coordinates: 20°53′47″N 94°48′29″E

Anawrahta Bridge is one of the bridges constructed by State Peace and Development Council of Myanmar. Anawrahta Bridge links Chauk and Seikphyu on Ayeyawady River (Irrawaddy River).

The main structure of the 5,191-foot Anawrahta Bridge, linking Chauk and Seikphyu townships in Magway Division, is 4,191 feet long. The length of the approach bridge is 1,000 feet. The steel frame body of the main structure is supported by reinforced concrete pillars. The approach bridge built of reinforced concrete spans and floors is also supported by reinforced concrete pillars.

The motorway on it is 28 feet wide. The pedestrian lane on either side of the road is six feet wide. The waterway under the facility is 350 feet wide and its clearance is 60 feet at the highest water level.

Construction of the bridge started on 26 July 1996 and was completed on 10 March 2001. It can bear up to 60-ton trucks. It was built at a cost of K 3,284 million (US$5.05 million).
