= Gangaw =

Gangaw Yaw City of Yaw
- Town
- Location in Burma
- Coordinates: 22°9′50″N 94°7′27″E
- Country: Myanmar
- Region: Magway Region
- District: Gangaw District
- Township: Gangaw Township
- Time zone: UTC+6.30 (MST)

Gangaw (Burmese: ဂန့်ဂေါမြို့, Burmese pronunciation: [ɡa̰ɰ̃ɡɔ́ mjo̰]) is a town of Gangaw Township in Gangaw District in the Magway Division in Myanmar. Gangaw is also known as the City of Yaw, a certain region in Myanmar including Gangaw (ဂန့်ဂေါ), Tilin (ထီးလင်း), Saw (ဆော) and villages around them. Gangaw District and Gangaw township was a part of Pakokku District until 2003. In 2003, Gangaw District was established. Myit Thar river (မြစ်သာမြစ်) flows from South to North dividing the town into Gangaw and Western Gangaw (အနောက်ဂန့်ဂေါ) village.

Kale-Gangaw Road was a main roadway linking Gangaw and Kalaymyo. It was 83 miles (134 km) long, the 59 miles and six furlongs was tarred road and three miles section, three furlongs was gravel road section and 19 miles and seven furlongs was earthen section. Mandalay-Gangaw Road is a main Road linking the center of Myanmar.

== Climate ==
Gangaw has a tropical savanna climate (Köppen Aw) with three seasons. The “cool” season from December to February is dry and clear with cool mornings and very warm to hot afternoons, gradually heating up to the sweltering and unpleasant “hot” season from March to mid-May, and to the monsoonal wet season from mid-May to October. Rainfall in Gangaw is lessened substantially by rain shadow effects from the Arakan Mountains to the west, although the city is less dry than Pakokku or Mandalay.

The 4.65 inches or 118.1 millimetres rainfall collected on 19 October 2011 was a new record for Gangaw for October over the past 47 years. The previous record was 4.21 inches or 106.9 millimetres on 3 October 1980.

Climate data for Gangaw (1981-2010)
| Month | Jan | Feb | Mar | Apr | May | Jun | Jul | Aug | Sep | Oct | Nov | Dec | Year |
|---|---|---|---|---|---|---|---|---|---|---|---|---|---|
| Mean daily maximum °C (°F) | 27.0 (80.6) | 31.0 (87.8) | 35.7 (96.3) | 38.9 (102.0) | 37.1 (98.8) | 34.3 (93.7) | 33.6 (92.5) | 32.3 (90.1) | 32.1 (89.8) | 31.4 (88.5) | 28.7 (83.7) | 26.4 (79.5) | 32.4 (90.3) |
| Mean daily minimum °C (°F) | 11.4 (52.5) | 12.9 (55.2) | 16.4 (61.5) | 21.8 (71.2) | 24.0 (75.2) | 25.0 (77.0) | 25.0 (77.0) | 24.8 (76.6) | 24.2 (75.6) | 22.9 (73.2) | 19.0 (66.2) | 13.9 (57.0) | 20.1 (68.2) |
| Average rainfall mm (inches) | 2.0 (0.08) | 4.7 (0.19) | 10.7 (0.42) | 31.1 (1.22) | 136.5 (5.37) | 183.6 (7.23) | 153.2 (6.03) | 230.2 (9.06) | 215.1 (8.47) | 173.4 (6.83) | 42.5 (1.67) | 6.9 (0.27) | 1,189.9 (46.85) |
Source: Norwegian Meteorological Institute
