= Myit Chay =

Myitchay မြစ်ခြေ Myitche
- Town
- Location in Myanmar (Burma)
- Coordinates: 21°14′41″N 94°51′26″E
- Country: Myanmar
- Division: Magway Region
- District: Magway Division
- Township: Pakokku Township
- Time zone: UTC+6.30 (MMT)

Myit Chay (Burmese: မြစ်ခြေ, also spelled as Myitche) is a town located in Pakokku Township, Magway Region, Myanmar. It is in the west bank of the Irrawaddy River and directly opposite to the temple town of Bagan. It is a small town where the locals mainly make a living from agriculture.

== History ==
On 10 May 2018, Myitche village tract in Pakokku Township was expanded and reorganized into Myitche Town, consisting of 8 wards.

=== Incidents ===
On 20 September, 2014, mob violence erupted in the area after rumours that a housemaid had been assaulted by her employer. Around 50 locals attacked the accused man's home, then vandalised his shop and a nearby mosque.

During the Myanmar civil war, since around 10 May 2026, the Myanmar military has carried out raids on villages in Myitche displacing about 80,000 civilians. On 13 May, the military forces reportedly carried out an operation across Myitche where troops from Battalions 101 and 415 entered the area and allegedly committed violence including killings, arson, and looting. After the troops withdrew on 1 June, local rescue teams recovered at least 31 bodies. At least 40 locals were killed in total and approximately 1,000 houses were burned by the junta. After the attack, about 19,100 residents were internally displaced.

On 10 June 2026, the People's Defence Force seized Myitche police station. Two junta troops were killed and 14 were captured during the raid.
