= Kyaw River =

Kyaw River Kyaw Chaung
- Native name: ကျောမြစ် (Burmese)

Location
- Country: Burma
- State: Magway Division

Physical characteristics
- Mouth: Yaw River; Pakokku District
  - coordinates: 21°27′17″N 94°30′47″E
  - elevation: 141 m (463 ft)

The Kyaw River (Burmese: ကျောမြစ်, Kyaw Chaung) is a river of upper Burma (Myanmar) in Magway Division. It is a major tributary of the Yaw River which it enters just below the town of Pauk.

== See also ==
- List of rivers of Burma
