= Htilin =

- Town
- Location in Myanmar
- Coordinates: 21°41′30″N 94°05′50″E
- Country: Myanmar
- Region: Magway Region
- District: Gangaw District
- Township: Htilin Township
- Time zone: UTC+6.30 (MST)

Htilin (Burmese: ထီးလင်းမြို့, Burmese pronunciation: [tʰílɪ́ɰ̃ mjo̰]; also spelt as Htilim or Htilin) is a town in Gangaw District in the Magway Region of Myanmar. It is the administrative seat for Tilin Township. It is located in western Magway Division contacted with Chin Hills.The people in this township speak Yaw Dialect(Sub-Burmese).
