= Myaing Township =

Myaing Township မြိုင် မြို့နယ်
- Township
- Location in Pakokku district

- Location in Myanmar
- Coordinates: 19°N 95°E
- Country: Myanmar
- Region: Magway
- District: Pakokku
- Capital: Myaing
- Time zone: UTC+6.30 (MMT)

Myaing Township (Burmese: မြိုင် မြို့နယ်) is a township of Pakokku District in the Magway Region of Myanmar. Its administrative seat is Myaing.

== Borders ==
Myaing Township is bordered by the following townships:

- Pale and Salingyi of Sagaing Region to the north;
- Yesagyo to the east;
- Pakokku Township to the south; and
- Pauk to the west.

== Transport ==
Since 1998 Myaing Township has been served by the branch line of the Myanmar Railways, from Pakokku to Myaing to Kyaw and on to the Myittha River valley.
