= Seikphyu =

- Town
- Location in Burma
- Coordinates: 20°54′N 94°48′E
- Country: Myanmar
- Region: Magway Region
- District: Pakokku District
- Township: Seikphyu Township
- Elevation: 62 m (204 ft)
- Time zone: UTC+6.30 (MST)

Seikphyu (Burmese: ဆိပ်ဖြူ) is the principal town and administrative seat for Seikphyu Township in Pakokku District in the Magway Division of Myanmar, on the right (western) bank of the Irrawaddy immediately below its confluence with the Yaw River. It is located across the Irrawaddy river from Chauk, to which it is connected by Anawrahta Bridge. It is situated 34 kilometers south-south-west of ancient Bagan City and 44 kilometers from Nyaung U Airport.
