= Pakokku District =

District of Myanmar

Pakokku District ပခုက္ကူခရိုင်
- Division

Myanma transcription(s)
  - Burmese: pa.khukku kha.ruing
- location in Magway region

- Location in Myanmar
- Coordinates: 21°25′N 94°45′E
- Country: Myanmar
- Region: Central
- Capital: Pakokku

Government
  - Chief Minister: Aung Moe Nyo (NLD)
  - Cabinet: Magway Region Government
  - Legislature: Magway Region Hluttaw
  - Judiciary: Pakokku District High Court

Area
  - Total: 8,310 km^{2} (3,210 sq mi)
  - Rank: 4th

Population (2014)
  - Total: 1,055,545
  - Rank: 7th
  - Density: 127/km^{2} (329/sq mi)
- Demonym: Pakokkuan

Demographics
  - Ethnicities: Bamar, Chin, Rakhine, Karen, Shan
  - Religions: Buddhism 98.8% Christianity 0.7% Islam 0.3% Hinduism 0.1% animism 0.1%
- Time zone: UTC+06:30 (MST)
- HDI (2017): 0.560 medium · 6th

Pakokku District (Burmese: ပခုက္ကူခရိုင်, pronounced [pə.kʰo̼ʊʔ.kù kʰə.jàɪɰ̃]; also Pagukku District) is a district of the Magway Division in central Burma (Myanmar). It is situated in northern part of Magwe Region. The administrative centre is the city of Pakokku. Pakokku is a largest city of Magway Division. It is also the 13th largest city of Burma (Myanmar). The townships of Pakokku District are Pakokku, Yesagyo, Pauk, Seikphyu, Myaing, Htilin, Saw and Gangaw.

== Geography ==
Pakokku district is located between north latitude 20°45' and 21°50' and east longitudes 94°15' and 95°20'. It lies in central Dry Zone of Myanmar and is situated on the western bank of Ayeyarwady River and Chindwin River.

== List of city and towns by urban population ==
Rank	City/Town	Township	2014 Census (2019 Estimate)	1993 Estimate	Change
1	Pakokku	Pakokku Township	107,557	90,783	+18.48%
2	Yesagyo	Yesagyo Township	23,603	23,329	+1.17%
3	Kamma	Pakokku Township	13,057	0	NA
4	Gangaw	Gangaw Township	11,955	13,955	−14.33%
5	Saw	Saw Township	9,706	5,078	+91.14%
6	Seikphyu	Seikphyu Township	9,174	9,081	+1.02%
7	Myaing	Myaing Township	8,294	7,706	+7.63%
8	Pauk	Pauk Township	7,820	7,286	+7.33%
9	Kyaukhtu	Saw Township	4,886	0	NA
10	Kyaw	Gangaw Township	4,680	0	NA
11	Htilin	Htilin Township	4,679	4,348	+7.61%
12	Myitche	Pakokku Township	4,665	0	NA

== Transportation ==
Transportation systems are fundamental factors for all-round development of any regions. Movement of people and flow of commodities are mostly dependent upon the transportation infrastructures, Pakokku District located at the western part of Ayeyarwady River is poor in transportation system although it has two good waterways: Ayeyarwady and Chindwin. Pakokku District is one of the economic centers of Central Myanmar, for all-round development of the district planning and managing for the development of transportation infrastructures will urgently needed.

== History ==
By 1947 Construction of the union of Burma, Pakokku province was established with two districts in 1948. They are Pakokku District and Kanpetlet District (Pakokku Hill Tracts) with 11 townships. Townships are Pakokku, Mindat, Yesagyo, Pauk, Seikphyu, Myaing, Gangaw, Htilin, Saw, Kanpetlet and Matupi. Capital city is Pakokku. In 1958, the name of Kanpetlet District was changed into Mindat District and Kanpetlet District's capital was moved to Mindat from Kanpetlet.

On 2 March 1962, the military led by General Ne Win took control of Burma through a coup d'état, and the government has been under direct or indirect control by the military. A new constitution of the Socialist Republic of the Union of Burma was adopted in 1974.

By the 1974 constitution, Pakokku province was abolished and Pakokku District was added to the Magway Division and Mindat District was added to the Chin State until now. On 4 April 1996, Pakokku District was divided into two districts. Pakokku, Pauk, Yesagyo, Myaing and Seikphyu became Pakokku District and Gangaw, Saw and Htilin became Gangaw District.

In October 2011, 7 wards and 95 villages were flooded because of heavy rain from tropical storm 02B which made a landfall at Myanmar-Bangladesh border on 19 Nov. All 4 townships of the District except Yesagyo were affected. 161 people were dead or missing according to Government data but total dead was more than 300 according to local news. 2657 households became homeless. 5 monasteries, 4 Dhammayons, 8 schools and 2,927 animals were destroyed. The total loss in the flood amounted to 1,522.95 million MMK, according to official data. UN agencies and international nongovernmental organizations such as WFP, UNICEF, BAJ and others donated 6,800 bags of rice, 18,390 viss of edible oil, 36,828 viss of gram and 3285 viss of salt worth US$261,620, 500 kilos of bleaching power, 440,000 tablets of water guard, 2,200 bottles of water guard, 2,200 sets of commodes, 2,200 cakes of carbolic soap, 2,200 sets of water family kit, four 400-gallon-capacity fibre water tanks worth US$53,782, 287 viss of edible oil, 3,442 packets of instant noodle, 1,642 viss of salt, 821 tinned fish, biscuits, cakes of soap, aluminium pots, torch lights, dry cells, steel bowls and T-shirts worth MMK 3.46 million.

== Townships ==
The district contains the following eight townships:

- Gangaw Township
- Htilin Township
- Myaing Township
- Pakokku Township
- Pauk Township
- Saw Township
- Seikphyu Township
- Yesagyo Township
