= Salin, Myanmar =

Salin
- Town
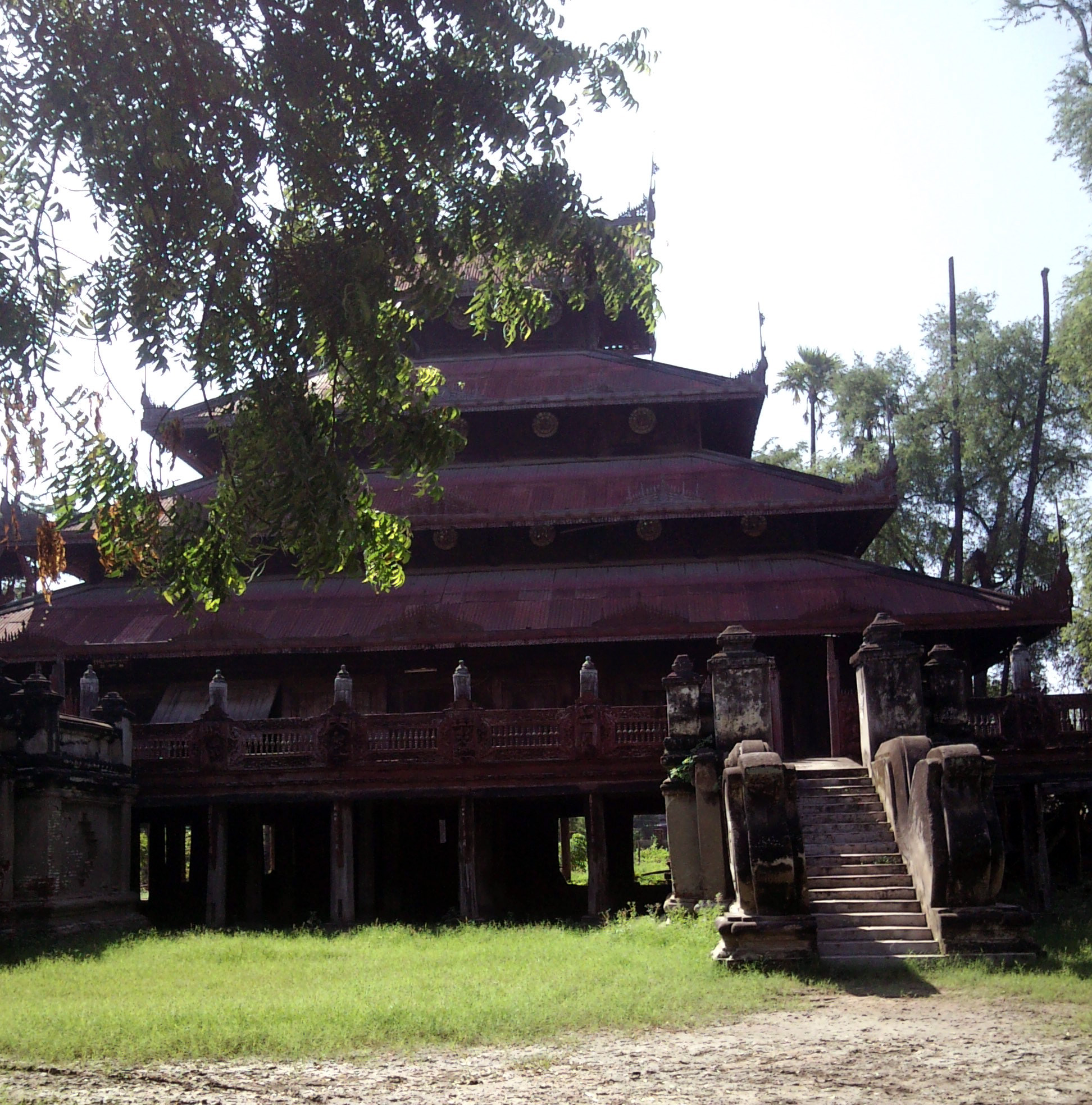
- Salin Yokeson Monastery
- Interactive map of Salin
- Coordinates: 20.575742°N 94.652198°E
- Country: Myanmar
- Region: Magway Region
- District: Minbu District
- Township: Salin Township

Area
  - Total: 0.494 sq mi (1.28 km^{2})
- Elevation: 195 ft (59 m)

Population (2014)
  - Total: 12,273
  - Density: 24,800/sq mi (9,590/km^{2})
- Time zone: UTC+6:30 (MST)

Salin (Burmese: စလင်းမြို့) is a town of Minbu District in Magway Region, Myanmar. Salin is on the western bank of the Irrawaddy River and is 50 miles (80 km) from the capital of Magway. The town, founded in 1179, is known for its collection of Buddhist monasteries and pagodas, a legacy of its prominent residents, who donated these public buildings. At the 2014 census, the urban population of Salin was 12,273. It is the principal town of Salin Township.

== History ==
In 1179, Bagan Kingdom king Sithu II established the town of Salin as part of his efforts to develop the realm. However, during the construction of irrigation channels and dams in the area, a tiger eating a deer was seen which was interpreted by astrologers as a bad sign. Therefore, the city was relocated and re-established a second time in 1194. The town was destroyed during the turmoil following the collapse of the Bagan Kingdom and the area came under the control of a brief rebellion by the Pinya king Thihathu's son-in-law. To shore up defences, the town was rebuilt in 1370 with better defensive walls and moats by the succeeding Ava Kingdom.

Prior to colonisation, the Salin area has been historically home to many hereditary noble families, with lesser nobles controlling various rural farmlands in the wider Minbu District. "Salin" itself eventually became a title for nobles who used it as an honorific since the 17th century.

== Sites of interest ==
- Wetthe Lake - a 1,000 acres (400 ha)-wide lake filled with lotus paddies, now a designated bird sanctuary.
- Salay Yokson Monastery (built 1868) - a towering monastery with 245 pillars, with an area of 13,350 square feet (1,240 m^{2}) and a height of 100 feet (30 m), known for its wood sculptures and handiwork. The structure was renovated by the government in 2003.
- U Ottama Monastery aka Kosaung Monastery (built 1819) - a Buddhist monastery consisting of 9 apartments and a tunnel. During the colonial era, it was known as the U Ottama Fort because revolutionary soldiers took refuge there. The structure was renovated in 2004.
