= Htilin Township =

Htilin Township ထီးလင်းမြို့နယ် Hteelin Township
- Township
- Location in Gangaw district

- Location within Myanmar
- Coordinates: 21°46′N 94°11′E
- Country: Myanmar
- Region: Magway
- District: Gangaw
- Capital: Htilin
- Time zone: UTC+6:30 (MMT)

Htilin Township (Burmese: ထီးလင်းမြို့နယ်, Burmese pronunciation: [tʰílɪ́ɰ̃ mjo̰nɛ̀], also spelt as Tilin) is a township of Gangaw District in the Magway Region of Myanmar. The principal town and administrative seat is Htilin.

== Communities ==
Among the towns and villages in Htilin Township are Akyiban, Inna, Kantha, Kyaing, Kyaw, Letpan, Mawle, Ngabyin, Sobya, Talin, Thanle, Ti, Wetthet, Nyaunggan, Zeetaw, Ainema, and Shwegontine.Butaung,
