= Yaw River =

Location
- Country: Burma

Physical characteristics
- Source: Confluence of Kyaw River and Kabyu River
  - coordinates: 21°25′13″N 94°36′48″E
- Mouth: Irrawaddy River
  - location: Just above Seikpyu
  - coordinates: 20°54′13″N 94°48′39″E

Basin features
- Tributaries
  - right: Sada-on River

Yaw River or Ywa River is a river of Burma, a tributary of the Irrawaddy. It flows into the Irrawaddy on the right (west) just above the town of Seikpyu, at 20°54′13″N 94°48′39″E.

The Yaw River forms when the Kyaw River and the Kabyu River flow together at 21°25′13″N 94°36′48″E. It flows basically south with a slight trend eastward. It flows past the towns of Ledaing, Anauk Kabyu, and Dawtha with its major tributary, the Sada-on River, entering on the right just below Dawtha.

== See also ==
- List of rivers of Burma
