= Magway Region Hluttaw =

Legislature of the Magway Region, Myanmar

Magway Region Hluttaw မကွေးတိုင်းဒေသကြီးလွှတ်တော်
- Magway Region Hluttaw

Type
- Type: Unicameral

History
- Founded: 8 February 2016

Leadership
- Speaker: Maung Maung Htay, Union Solidarity and Development Party (USDP) since 2025-26 Myanmar general election
- Deputy Speaker: Lhwam Moe Htet, Union Solidarity and Development Party (USDP) since 2025-26 Myanmar general election

Structure
- Seats: 62
- Political groups: USDP (47); Military (15)

Elections
- Last election: 2025-26 Myanmar general election

Meeting place
- Region Hluttaw Meeting Hall; Magway, Magway Region

Website
- magwayregion.hluttaw.mm

Magway Region Hluttaw (Burmese: မကွေးတိုင်းဒေသကြီးလွှတ်တော်; lit. 'Magway Region Assembly') is the legislature of Magway Region, Myanmar. It is a unicameral body with 62 seats, including 47 elected members and 15 military appointees. However, after the 2021 Myanmar coup d'état, the Hluttaw ceased to function, and its elected representatives were either arrested, forced into hiding, or displaced. The Hluttaw has resumed its functions as the legislature of Magway Region since 2026.

The military junta overthrew the democratically elected government, leaving the legislature inoperative. From 2021 to 2026, the Magway Region Hluttaw did not have any functioning leadership, including the Speaker, Deputy Speaker, or elected members. During that time period, the legislature was effectively seatless and inactive, with the military controlling the country and its political institutions.

== Post-coup legislative status ==
Since the coup, the Magway Region Hluttaw, like all other state and regional legislatures in Myanmar, was dissolved as an active legislative body. There had been no elections to replace the NLD representatives, and the military junta had monopolized power at the national and regional levels. The legislature, as a democratic institution, was no longer operational.

However, from late 2025 to early 2026, elections for both the Union Assembly, and State and Region Assemblies took place. These elections was also held for the Magway Region Hluttaw.

== Current Composition ==
The third Hluttaw session commenced on 20 March 2026. Under the revised electoral framework, the assembly transitioned from a First-Past-The-Post (FPTP) system to a Proportional Representation (PR) system.

The current seat distribution is as follows:

- Union Solidarity and Development Party (USDP): 46 seats (Includes Chin Ethnic Affairs)
- Tatmadaw Military Appointees: 15 seats (25% of total)

| Party | Seats |
|---|---|
| USDP | 46 |
| Representative for CEA (USDP) | 1 |
| Military appointees | 15 |
| Total seats | 62 |

== Leadership ==
The Speaker and Deputy Speaker were elected during the first regular session of the third Hluttaw:

- Speaker: Maung Maung Htay (USDP)
- Deputy Speaker: Lhwam Moe Htet (USDP)

== See also ==
- State and Region Hluttaws
- Pyidaungsu Hluttaw
