= Myaing =

Myaing မြိုင်မြို့
- Town
- Location in Burma
- Coordinates: 21°37′N 94°51′E
- Country: Myanmar
- Region: Magway Region
- District: Pakokku District
- Township: Myaing Township
- Time zone: UTC+6.30 (MST)

Myaing (Burmese: မြိုင်မြို့, MLCTS: mruing mrui. [mjaiɰ̃]) is a town and seat of Myaing Township in the Magway Region of central Myanmar.

== Transport ==
It was connected to the Myanmar Railway network in 1998.

== See also ==
- Transport in Myanmar
