= Saw Township =

Saw Township ဆောမြို့နယ်
- Township
- Location in Gangaw district

- Location in Myanmar
- Coordinates: 21°13′N 94°12′E
- Country: Myanmar
- Region: Magway Region
- District: Pakokku
- Capital: Saw
- Time zone: UTC+6:30 (MMT)

Saw Township (Burmese: ဆောမြို့နယ်, Burmese pronunciation: [sʰɔ́ mjo̰nɛ̀]) is a township of Pakokku District in the Magway Region of Myanmar. The principal town and administrative seat is Saw.

== Communities ==
Kyauktu (Kyaukhtu) is the second largest town in Saw Township.

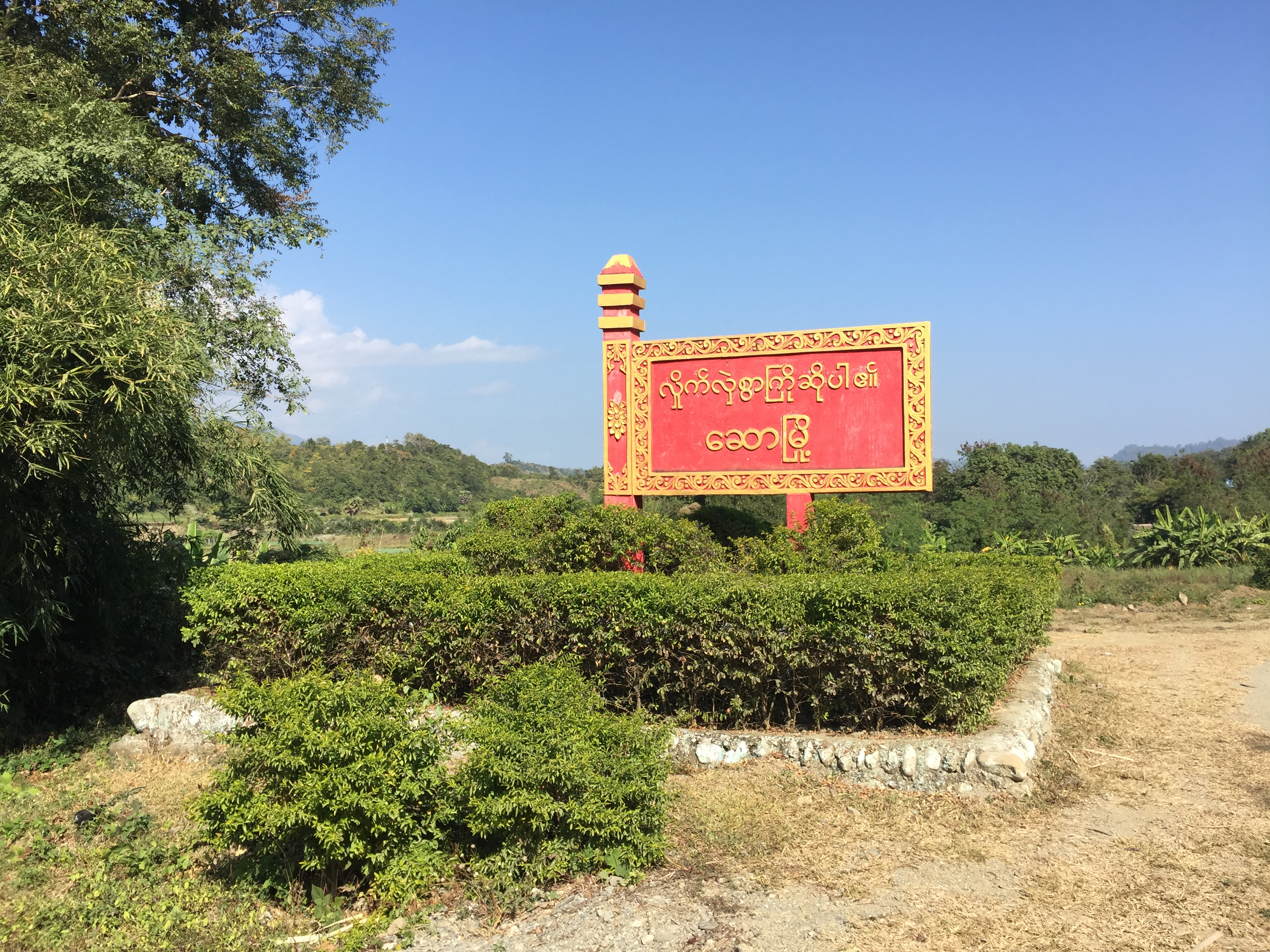
Saw Township Signboard
