= Gangaw District =

District in Myanmar

Coordinates: 21°48′N 94°11′E

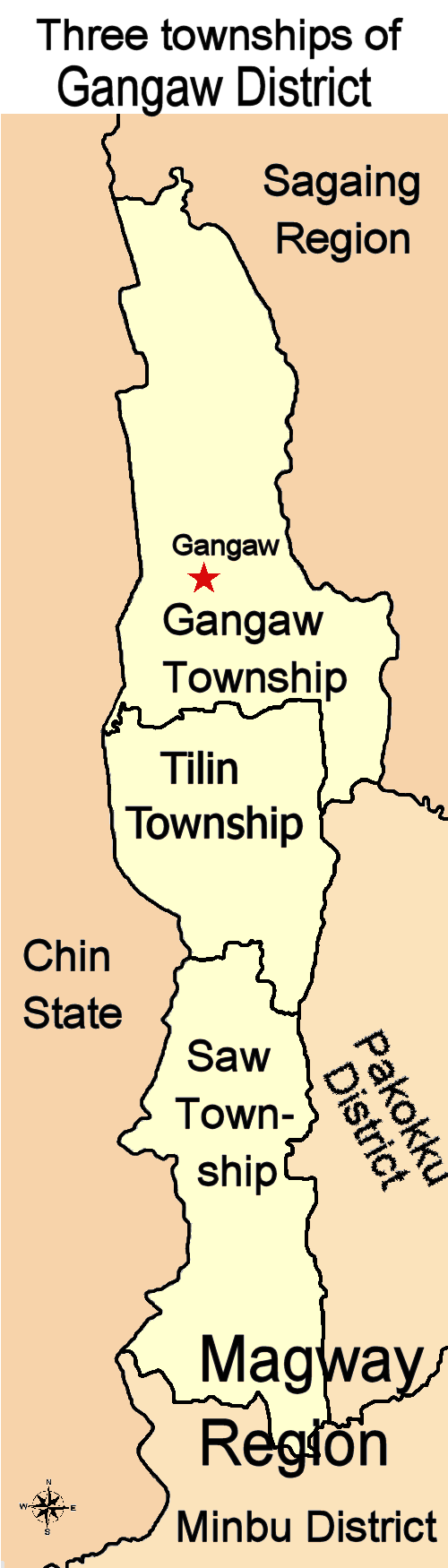

Gangaw District (Burmese: ဂန့်ဂေါ ခရိုင်, Burmese pronunciation: [ɡa̰ɰ̃ɡɔ́ kʰəjàiɰ̃]) is a district of the Magway Division in central Myanmar.

Pakokku is the capital city of Pakokku District and Gangaw District. In 1926, it became a part of Pakokku Hill Tracts Districts of British Burma until 1948, and was administratively part of Pakokku District until 2003.

== Townships ==
The district contains the following townships:

- Gangaw Township
- Saw Township
- Htilin Township
