= Ngape clashes =

2024 battle in Magway

Ngape Township clashes
- Part of Dry Zone theater and Rakhine Theatre in the Myanmar civil war
Date	First phase: 21 November 2024 – 14 January 2025 (1 month, 3 weeks and 3 days); Second phase: 14 January 2025 – present (1 year, 1 month, 2 weeks and 3 days)
Location	Ann-Padan Road, Ngape Township (Magway Region), Rakhine State – Magway Region border
Result	Ongoing

Belligerents
State Administration Council	First phase: People's Revolution Alliance (Magway); Asho Chin Defence Force; Second phase: Arakan Army; People's Revolution Alliance (Magway); Asho Chin Defence Force

Commanders and leaders
Tatmadaw Lieutenant Colonel Kyaw Kyaw Thet (POW) (Note: Commander of Strategic Team 992, part of LID 99. Surrendered to the AA after fierce battle.)	unknown

Units involved
Tatmadaw: Myanmar Army; Western Command (Note: Troops reatreating from Ann after the battle); Light Infantry Division 99 (Note: Deployed as reinforcements on the Rakhine-Magway Border); Strategic Team 991, 992, 993	Arakan Army; People's Revolution Alliance (Magway); Asho Chin Defence Force; Minbu District No. 2 Battalion

Casualties and losses
Tatmadaw; First phase: 21+ KIAs; 23+ POWs; Second phase: Hundreds of casualties: two vehicles destroyed, one damaged	Arakan Army: unknown; People's Revolution Alliance (Magway): unknown; Asho Chin Defence Force: at least 1 KIA and 1 WIA

The Ngape clashes were a series of military engagements during the 2021 Myanmar civil war that started on 21 November 2024. Frequent clashes were reported in mountainous areas along the Ann-Padan Road on the border between Rakhine State and Magway Region, as local resistance groups attempted to prevent junta reinforcements and supplies from reaching Ann town where the Arakan Army (AA) was besieging the town during the Battle of Ann. The military regime has relied on the road for transporting troops and supplies into Rakhine State since the Arakan Army relaunched a major anti-regime offensive in November in 2023. The clashes were characterized by an intense guerilla warfare, with many ambushes against junta's troops and convoys by resistance forces with light weapons and IEDs or landmines, together with a full-scale military operation by the Arakan Army during the second phase.

== Background ==
Ngape Township is a township of Minbu District in the Magway Region of Myanmar. The principal town is Ngape. Minbu District is bounded to the south by Thayet District, to the east by Magway District, to the north by Pakokku District, to the northwest by Mindat District of Chin State, and to the west by Sittwe District of Rakhine State and Kyaukpyu District of Rakhine State.

The Ann-Padan Road links Magway Region to Rakhine State. It has been vital for the regime since the start of the AA led Rakhine offensive (2023–present).

== Clashes ==
=== First phase ===
Firefight broke out on the Ann-Padan Road in Ngape Township the 21st of November as a resistance group, the People's Revolution Alliance (Magway) ambushed 40 regime forces east of Gokkyi Village, the resistance group said. The group also claimed to have killed nine regime forces in the ambush while wounding 10 others. One of the local resistance groups, the Chin Defense Force - Asho (CDF-Asho), said it ambushed 20 regime forces performing security duty on a section of Ann-Padan Road in Ngape Township, Magway Region at around 6 a.m. on Monday 25 November. During the ambush, four regime soldiers were killed and many others injured, while a military weapon and some equipment were seized.

On the 3rd of January Chinland Defence Force-Asho captured 11 junta soldiers who fled their bases in Rakhine State's Ann Township. Anti-regime groups including CDF-Asho also ambushed two trucks from the junta's ordnance factory No. 14 in Magway Region's Ngape Township, killing one junta soldier. Always on January 3, the People's Revolution Alliance (Magway) ambushed junta soldiers from Nat Yay Kan artillery base, killing three and wounding one. Other four regime troops were killed and three others injured in an ambush by the People's Revolution Alliance (Magway) on around 30 troops in Ngape Township on January 7.

Between 13 and 14 January, twelve junta soldiers who had fled from Ann town in Arakan State were captured by Chinland Defense Force-Asho.

=== Second phase ===
Starting from January 11 the ethnic Arakan Army (AA) and allies have launched an assault on Myanmar junta outposts guarding an artillery base on the Ann-Padan Road linking Rakhine State with neighboring Magway Region, according to local sources. Fighting broke out on Saturday 11 January at outposts in two Arakan Mountain villages close to Goggyi, located just 32 kilometers from Padan in Magwe's Ngape Township. The People's Revolution Alliance-Magway group reported attacking five junta vehicles carrying around 100 junta soldiers near Goggyi village with remote-controlled mines, killing four and wounding 13 others.

The People's Revolution Alliance in Magway Region on January 23 detained 12 regime troops, including two captains, and killed at least 10 others as it attacked soldiers fleeing fighting on the Magwe-Rakhine border. It also said it ambushed four military vehicles carrying approximately 100 troops and ammunition on the Ann-Padan Road in Ngape Township, Magway Region, on January 19, killing five soldiers and destroying a vehicle.

On January 28 the AA said it was advancing along the Ann-Padan toward Magwe Region's Ngape Township with help from at least three local resistance groups. Chin Defence Force (Asho) said it had captured 17 regime soldiers and seized their weapons and ammunition as they retreated along the Ann-Padan Road from Ann Township during fighting on January 25-26.

The Arakan Army reports seizing a junta defensive position in Ngape Township, Magway Region over February 1st-2nd, killing several dozen soldiers as it expands operations beyond its home state of Rakhine. Junta reinforcements from the 99th Light Infantry Division (LID) arrived on 28 military trucks to take up a defensive position at Gote-see-yoe village on the Ann-Padan Road near the Rakhine-Magwe border on January 29. AA troops started raiding the position on January 31, killing over 60 junta soldiers and capturing others, according to sources on the ground. They also seized a large cache of weapons and ammunition. Over 1,300 junta soldiers were reportedly dispatched to the border as of Jan. 29, but only around 700 remain after hundreds were killed in action, surrendered or fled, according to sources on the ground by February 3.

On January 31 Junta Lieutenant Colonel Kyaw Kyaw Thet and 20 troops surrendered to the AA after the unit was defeated in battle by the ethnic armed organization in Ngape Township, Magway Region. Lt-Col Kyaw Kyaw Thet led a 360-plus-member of Strategic Team 992, comprising troops from various battalions under LID 99, to the Padan Village-tract area in the township. Two days after the strategic team arrived in Padan, AA forces attacked the Payakone Pagoda area, forcing the unit to retreat to a location known as Point 1455. Clashes continued over the following days, and Strategic Teams 991 and 993 were also deployed to the area. However, Strategic Team 992 and the other two teams suffered heavy casualties. According to Lt-Col Kyaw Kyaw Thet in a video account registered by the AA, his team alone lost a hundred soldiers in the initial clashes, with another hundred injured. They lacked sufficient medicine and medical equipment to adequately treat the wounded, he said.

On 18 February local sources report that the Arakan Army has launched new attacks during the week in an area near the Nat Yae Kan Air Defense Base in Ngape Township, Magway Region. The offensive targets junta camps along the Ann-Padan Road. Following the AA's capture of Tone Gyi Village in Ngape Township in recent days, the clashes have now extended to the Nat Yae Kan, situated about five miles east of the village.

On 21 February a video emerges about resistance fighters belonging to the Asho Chin Defense Force launching a raid on junta forces in the western hills of the Ngape Township in Magway Region.

On 23 February, another video emerges about CDF Asho forces ambushing a Military Council convoy in Ngape Township, Magway Division. Fighters used machine guns and planted Landmines/IEDs. In the video some vehicles appear to be on fire after getting hit by explosions. The next day The Irrawaddy confirms the news stating that seven junta soldiers were killed in the ambush and that one military vehicle was destroyed and another burned. The convoy was carrying weapons from an air defense unit. One resistance fighter was killed, and another was injured on the CDF-Asho side.

On 25 February, PRA-Magway ambushed around 20 junta soldiers conducting a patrol near Sinkona Farm by Natne Lake, wounding four troops. On the morning of 28 February, PRA-Magway attacked a 60-member junta column moving from the same area, reportedly killing six soldiers and injuring four others. On 18 March targeted a 40-strong military column comprising troops from the junta's Light Infantry Division 99 at the Lai village intersection in Ngape Township. PRA-Magway reported that seven soldiers were killed and four wounded in the attack. On 30 March, when PRA-Magway forces attacked an entrance gate to Padan Town along the Pathein–Monywa road. Six junta soldiers were killed and four more injured in the attack. The 30 March operation was conducted in collaboration with the Minbu District No. 2 Battalion. According to PRA-Magway, the Padan entrance gate was jointly guarded by over 20 personnel from the police, Military Security Affairs, and army and is frequently used to extort money and harass civilians and shopkeepers.

Local sources report that military council forces have been coercing villagers into joining militia units and assigning them to guard duties in villages located between Nat Yay Kan and Padan towns in Ngape Township, Magway Region, amid rising concerns that the AA and resistance forces may enter the area.

== See also ==
- Dry Zone theater
- Rakhine offensive (2023–present)
- Kyaw Kyaw Thet
