= Minhla Township, Magway =

Minhla Township (မင်းလှမြို့နယ်)
- Township
- Location in Thayet district

- Location in Myanmar
- Coordinates: 19.96°N 95.03°E
- Country: Myanmar
- Region: Magway
- District: Thayet
- Capital: Minhla

Population (2014)
  - Total: 146,082
- Time zone: UTC+6.30 (MMT)

Minhla Township is a township of Thayet District in the Magway Region of Myanmar. The administrative seat of the township is Minhla.

== Geography ==
Minhla Township has a total area of 2,371.4 km^{2}. It is bordered to the north by the townships of Ngape and Minbu of Minbu District. It borders Rakhine State to the east. In the east, the township borders Magway Township of Magway Division. Within its own district, are its southern border townships of Mindon, Thayet, and Sinbaungwe. There are an estimated 153 villages.

Minhla Township experiences relatively humid and hot weather, with temperatures reaching a high of 45°C to a low of 15°C.

== Demographics ==
As of 2014, the town has 146,082 inhabitants. The township has an approximately equal population of males (50.1%) and females (49.9%). The average age is 29 years. Approximately 87.9 percent of the population are Buddhist, while a small percentage are Christian, Islam, Hindu, Animist, non-religious, or practices other faiths. The population consists of Karen, Chin, Bamar, Rakhine and Shan ethnicities.

== Economy ==
The economy is dependent on agriculture in harvesting sesame, legume and cotton.
