= Thayet Township =

Thayet Township သရက်မြို့နယ်
- Township
- Location in Thayet district

- Location in Burma
- Coordinates: 19°19′N 95°05′E
- Country: Myanmar
- Region: Magway Region
- District: Thayet
- Capital: Thayetmyo
- Time zone: UTC+6.30 (MST)

Thayet Township (Burmese: သရက်မြို့နယ်) is a township of Thayet District in the Magway Region of Burma (Myanmar). It lies on the west side of the Irrawaddy. The major town and administrative center is Thayet. Notable peaks are Mount Myinba (1688 ft.) and Mount Myinmagyi (1032 ft.).

== Bounds ==
Thayet Township is bordered by the following townships:

- Minhla to the north,
- Sinbaungwe to the northeast,
- Aunglan (Myayde) to the east and southeast,
- Kamma to the southwest, and
- Mindon to the west.

== Villages ==
Among the many villages and wards (village census tracts) in Thayet Township are Banbyin, Kobin, Kyaukaing, Pyaye, Ta La Bar, Talabasan, Ton, and Yebyu.
