= Dry Zone theater =

Theater of war in the Myanmar civil war (2021-present)

- Part of the Myanmar civil war (2021–present)
- Townships within the Dry Zone Regions with territory included within the Dry Zone Townships and regions located wholly outside the Dry Zone
Date	April 2021 – present
Location	Magway region, southern Sagaing region, western and central parts of Mandalay region, Myanmar
Status	Ongoing

Belligerents
(Myanmar) State Administration Council; Tatmadaw; Myanmar Army; Myanmar Air Force; Pyusawhti militias	People's Defence Force; Burma National Revolutionary Army; People's Revolution Alliance

The Dry Zone theater, also known as the Anyar theater, is one of the theaters of the Myanmar civil war (2021–present), taking place in Myanmar's Dry Zone (or Anyar) region which encompasses the Bamar-majority Sagaing, Magway and Mandalay regions. It has been described as the "prime center" of resistance against the junta.

== Background ==
The Dry Zone has been the historic heartland of Myanmar and rarely saw armed violence in the modern conflict in Myanmar since 1948 as a predominantly Buddhist and Bamar farming region. This led to the Tatmadaw (the military of Myanmar) to not maintain a heavy presence there.

The fighting in the Dry Zone theater starting in 2021 changed this trajectory. Without the presence of EAOs, the Bamar PDF groups are characterized as local cells acting autonomously towards simple and directed action against the military towards the 2021 coup. In the 2021-2022 dry season, the PDFs began to work more closely together and coordinated towards larger goals.

== Timeline ==
=== 2021 ===
After the coup, the Dry Zone saw a "precipitous uptick in violence".

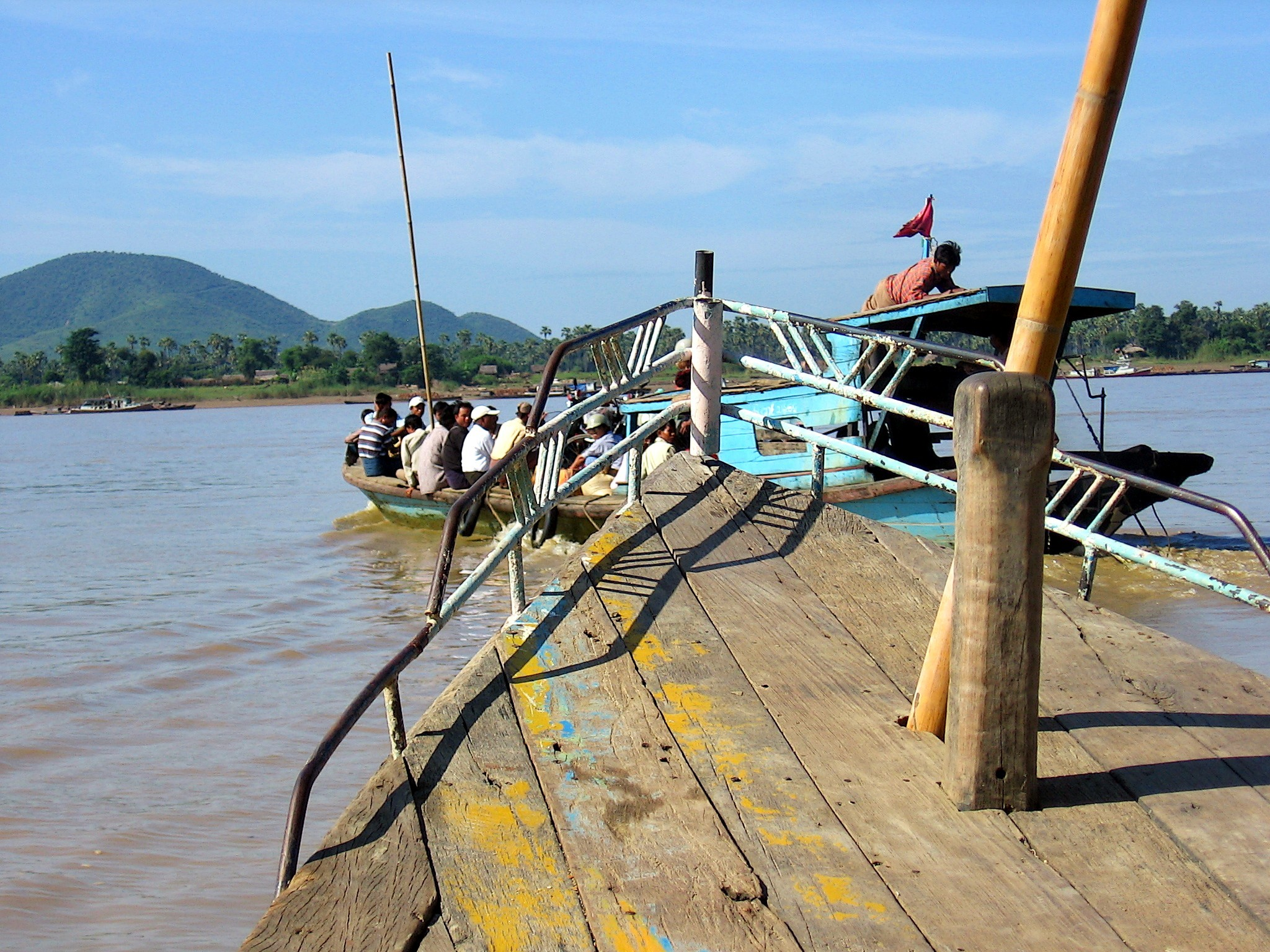
Small river boats on the Chindwin River near Monywa, 2006

In late November 2021, junta forces ambushed and destroyed a base belonging to Monywa PDF's Squadron 205 near Palin village, Sagaing Region, forcing resistance fighters to flee. The base was the site of a workshop where the PDF had made explosive devices, which were destroyed during the raid. On 9 December 2021, the Myaing PDF in Magway Region ambushed two military vehicles with 3 handmade explosives, claiming to have injured at least 3 soldiers. Salingyi G-Z PDF fighters detonated explosives in another attack on a convoy in Salingyi, triggering an assault on the town by about 100 junta soldiers. The soldiers captured and burnt 10 fighters and one civilian.

In December 2021, the military sent around 150 Airborne Division soldiers in helicopters to the west of Depayin to carry out air assault missions. They surrounded Depayin Township where PDF fighters were positioned. On 13 December, Tatmadaw troops launched an offensive to retake Ke Bar, Ayadaw Township with the assistance of artillery and forced resistance fighters to retreat. On 17 December, the Tatmadaw and a military-backed Pyusawhti militia launched a surprise air assault on Hnan Khar, Gangaw Township in Magway Region killing 20 resistance fighters from the Yaw Defence Force. In late 2021, Myaung PDF resistance forces "seized two boats, an oil vessel and a cargo ship" on the Chindwin River on the grounds that "those on board were unable to demonstrate that the vessels did not belong to the junta".

=== 2022 ===
As targeted personnel attacks increased, around 50 Myanmar junta personnel and Pyusawhti militia members were reportedly killed during raids and ambushes by PDF across three townships in Sagaing Region on 9 February 2022. The PDF ambushed flotillas transporting supplies and soldiers, setting at least one flotilla on fire. On 7 February, junta soldiers were killed by local PDF surprise attacks using drones in the Sagaing Region. The PDF also suffered losses, with 12 fighters killed in a battle in Khin-U Township.

Many cities saw violent clashes during Union Day. PDF forces launched an attack in Naypyitaw, the capital city, during the military's celebrations, killing at least 4 junta soldiers. Mandalay also saw civilian guerrilla groups and PDFs in Maha Aung Myay and Pyigyidagun Townships shooting at junta forces and throwing homemade bombs. Tatmadaw troops killed eight guerrilla fighters while raiding two resistance hideouts in retaliation.

=== 2023 ===
In October 2023, anti-junta forces launched Operation Taungthaman in the Mandalay Region.

On 6 November 2023, Kawlin, Sagaing Region fell to the coalition during Operation 1027, marking the first district-level capital seized during the operation.

=== 2024 ===
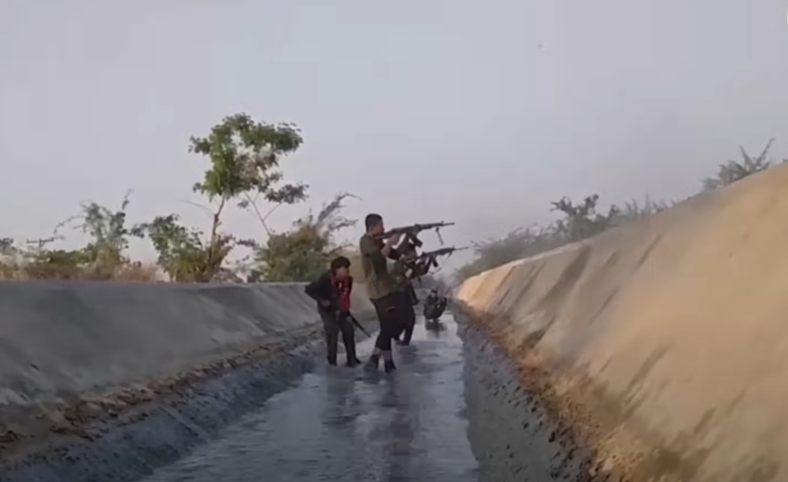
PDF forces in Magway Region, August 2024

The Local PDFs in the Dry Zone are now more interconnected with the NUG. However, they still predominantly use hit-and-run tactics.

Tatmadaw forces recaptured the district capital of Kawlin on 10 February after almost 10 days of fighting. After this, junta forces razed the settlement, destroying the majority of homes in Kawlin and surrounding villages. On 22 February, junta forces launched an offensive to recapture the town of Maw Luu from the KIA and ABSDF. The joint rebel forces had taken the key town in December 2023, blocking the Shwebo-Myitkyina road, during Operation 1027. On 14 March, junta forces took the village of Kampani, Kalay Township in a campaign to resist anti-junta attacks on Kalay. Despite the campaign, on 16 March resistance forces captured the Pyusawhti-controlled village of Kyaung Taik north of Kalay.

While the junta launched its counteroffensives, allied resistance launched an offensive to capture Kani, capturing around 80% of the town by 7 March. After almost 10 days of fighting, by 15 March, rebels were forced to give up their efforts to capture the town after overwhelming junta resistance.

On 4 April 2024 the People's Defense Force launched an unprecedented drone attack against Aye Lar airbase, the main Tatmadaw headquarters, and Min Aung Hlaing's residence in the capital, Naypyidaw. Almost 30 drones were deployed; junta forces claimed 7 were shot down. Myawaddy TV said 13 fixed-wing drones were shot down and there were no casualties or damage to property. NUG claimed the attack was "a success". On 12 April, local People's Defense Forces claimed that they killed over a dozen junta soldiers in another attack on Aye Lar Airbase.

On 19 April junta forces launched a counteroffensive to retake Shwe Pyi Aye, Homalin Township, after it was captured in November 2023.

On 11 June the Union Liberation Front and Sagaing Region People's Defence Organisation captured a junta base near the Sagaing capital Monywa. On 27 June, a coalition of several PDFs launched an offensive on Budalin.

On 17 July, People's Defense Forces launched 2 rockets at Nay Pyi Taw International Airport, causing no casualties.

On 10 August, Myingyan District PDF launched an offensive against Taungtha and Natogyi. Natogyi was briefly captured before being recaptured by the junta soon after. On 15 August, PDF launched an offensive on Tabayin, capturing the town by 18 August. Shortly after, due to a junta counteroffensive, PDF withdrew from the town. In mid-August, the KIA and PDF launched joint offensives on Indaw, Pinlebu, and Htigyaing. Resistance entirely capturing Pinlebu on 8 October, defeating almost 800 junta soldiers.

On 27 October, the anniversary of Operation 1027, Maung Saungkha announced that the Bamar People's Liberation Army would begin operations in the Anyar region of Myanmar.

On 11 November, the Burma National Revolution Army and several other PDF's launched attacks on Pale. After capturing several areas of the town, they were forced to retreat due to a junta counteroffensive.

Firefight broke out on the Ann-Padan Road in Ngape Township on the 21st of November as a resistance group, the People's Revolution Alliance (Magway) ambushed 40 regime forces east of Gokkyi Village, the resistance group said. The group also claimed to have killed nine regime forces in the ambush while wounding 10 others. One of the local resistance groups, the Chin Defense Force - Asho (CDF-Asho), said it ambushed 20 regime forces performing security duty on a section of Ann-Padan Road in Ngape Township, Magway Region at around 6 a.m. on Monday, 25 November. During the ambush, four regime soldiers were killed and many others were injured, while a military weapon and some equipment were seized.

=== 2025 ===
Starting from January 11, the ethnic Arakan Army (AA) and allies have launched an assault on Myanmar junta outposts guarding an artillery base on the Ann-Padan Road linking Rakhine State with neighboring Magway Region, according to local sources. Fighting broke out on Saturday, 11 January at outposts in two Arakan Mountain villages close to Goggyi, located just 32 kilometers from Padan in Magwe’s Ngape Township. The People’s Revolution Alliance-Magway group reported attacking five junta vehicles carrying around 100 junta soldiers near Goggyi village with remote-controlled mines, killing four and wounding 13 others.

On 15 March 2025, the Myanmar Junta launched a military operation to recapture some rural areas in Katha Township. State Administration Council troops from LID 309 departure from Katha Town assaulting resistance positions in rural areas of the township, suffering a devastating defeat against fighters from Katha PDF.

== Humanitarian impact ==
According to the research group Data for Myanmar, more than 57,183 civilian homes in Anyar have been burned down by junta forces, making up 94% of the total number of civilian homes burned down across the country.

Since 2021, as a result of the state-sponsored violence following the 2021 Myanmar coup d'état, increasing temperatures, the COVID-19 pandemic, and increasingly poor harvests, a widespread exodus of Dry Zone residents to other areas of Myanmar has occurred.

== Analysis ==
Some analysts have "refer[red] to the Anyar theater as part of a broad corridor connecting major insurgents in the northern Kachin State and the western Rakhine State on the Bay of Bengal seaboard, even comparing it with the Ho Chi Minh trail."

== See also ==
- Chin theater
- Conflict in Rakhine State (2016–present)

== Bibliography ==
- Ye Myo Hein (May 2022). "One Year On: The Momentum of Myanmar's Armed Rebellion" (PDF). Woodrow Wilson International Center for Scholars. Archived from the original (PDF) on 2 April 2024.
