= Aung Moe Nyo =

Burmese politician

His Excellency Dr Aung Moe Nyo
- အောင်မိုးညို

2nd Chief Minister of Magway Region
- In office 30 March 2016 – 1 February 2021
- Appointed by: President of Myanmar
- President: Htin Kyaw
- Preceded by: Phone Maw Shwe
- Succeeded by: Tint Lwin

Personal details
- Education: Yangon Institute of Medicine (G.1982)
- Cabinet: Magway Region Government

Aung Moe Nyo (Burmese: အောင်မိုးညို), a doctor, is a Burmese politician who served as Chief Minister of Magway Region, the head of the Magway Region Government, from 2016 to 2021. He was elected from NLD in the former elections and re-elected in the 2015 election and became the chief minister in 2016.

== Early life and education ==
Aung Moe Nyo graduated from Rangoon Institute of Medicine in 1982 and started his own clinic in 1984.

== Political career ==
He won a seat in the 1990 election, capturing 74 percent of the vote. He was one of the NLD MPs-elect who were arrested in 1998 and kept without trial in military prisons referred to as “guesthouses”. He was released in 2001 and elected as a lower house MP in the 2012 by-election.

He was re-elected in 2015 for Pwintbyu Township. He promised to prioritise resolving land-grab cases. He became chief minister of Magway region in 2016.

In the wake of the 2021 Myanmar coup d'état on 1 February, Aung Moe Nyo was detained by the Myanmar Armed Forces. As of October 2021, authorities had charged Aung Moe Nyo with corruption, bribery, and incitement.
