= Yepokgyi =

Yepokgyi ရေပုတ်ကြီး
- Village Tract
- Yae Poke Gyi
- Interactive map of Yepokgyi
- Location in Myanmar
- Coordinates: 20.41895°N 94.58815°E
- Country: Myanmar
- Region: Magway Region
- District: Minbu District
- Township: Pwintbyu Township
- Village Tract: Yae Poke Gyi

Population (2014)
  - Total: 2,990
- Time zone: UTC+6:30 (MMT)
- Postal code: 186148

Yepokgyi (Burmese: ရေပုတ်ကြီး, variously spelt Yay Pote Gyi and Yae Poke Gyi) is a village tract located in Pwintbyu Township, Minbu District, Magwe Region, Myanmar. In 2014, the Yepokgyi had 596 households, including 2,990 people, evenly divided between males and females. The village tract only consists of one village- the village of Yepokgyi. The village was connected by a road in 2018.

The village is part of Anyar, the heartland of the Bamar people in Upper Myanmar's dry zone. The village is near Yadana Oo Pagoda, a historic pilgrimage site.

== Customs ==
Yepokgyi villagers are known for preserving a distinct tradition of wearing a topknot with a high ponytail, surrounded by an even fringe of hair across the head. The tradition dates back at least two centuries. The hairstyle begins as children approach school age. For girls, the hairstyle is called hsanyitwaing (ဆံရစ်ဝိုင်း), while it is called yaungpezu (သျှောင်ပေစူး) for boys. When girls turn 15 to 16, the hairstyle is known as Japan zadauk (ဂျပန်ဆံထောက်). By the age of 17 to 18, the hairstyle progresses into the Japan zadauk naukkauk (ဂျပန် ဆံထောက် နောက်ကောက်), whereby the a curl of hair wraps underneath each ear, indicating their readiness for courtship.

== Education ==
Yepokgyi has a single school that was upgraded into a secondary school in 2015. The nearest high school is located in the village of Shauktaw, 8 miles away.
