= Kyaukpyok, Mindon =

Kyaukpyok
- Village
- Location in Burma
- Coordinates: 19°25′N 94°49′E
- Country: Burma
- Region: Magway Region
- District: Thayet District
- Township: Mindon Township
- Time zone: UTC+6.30 (MST)

Kyaukpyok is a village in Mindon Township, Thayet District, in the Magway Region of southwestern Burma.

== People ==
In 1929 it was documented to have a population of 140 with one well, supplemented by water from the Inma Chaung, two miles away.
