= Kyaw Kyaw Thet =

Burmese military officer

His Excellency Lieutenant Colonel Kyaw Kyaw Thet
- ကျော်ကျော်သက်
- Born: Myanmar (Burma)
- Education: Defence Services Academy
- Military career
- Allegiance: Myanmar
- Branch: Myanmar Army
- Service years: Unknown – 2025
- Rank: Lieutenant Colonel
- Unit: Light Infantry Division 99
- Commands: Strategic Team 992
- Conflicts: Myanmar civil war (2021–present): Rakhine offensive (2023–present); Ngape clashes

Kyaw Kyaw Thet (Burmese: ကျော်ကျော်သက်; pronounced [t͡ɕɔ̀ t͡ɕɔ̀ θɛʔ]; born Myanmar) is a Burmese military officer who previously served as a Lieutenant Colonel in Light Infantry Division (LID) 99 of the Tatmadaw (Myanmar military). He was the commander of Strategic Team 992, which was engaged in clashes with the Arakan Army (AA) in Magwe Region. On 31 January 2025, he surrendered to the AA along with 20 remaining troops following heavy battlefield losses.

== Early life and education ==
Kyaw Kyaw Thet was born in Myanmar. Details regarding his upbringing, family background, and formal education have not been widely documented in publicly available sources.

== Military career ==
Kyaw Kyaw Thet commanded Strategic Team 992, a unit formed under LID 99 and stationed in Yamethin Township, Mandalay Region. In late 2024, the unit was deployed to Ngape Township, Magwe Region, an area bordering Ann Township, Rakhine State, amid increasing conflict with the Arakan Army (AA).

In December 2024, he and his troops underwent specialized combat training at the No. 3 Basic Military Training School in Ngape, focusing on the use of MA-7 extended-range mortars. Shortly after, Strategic Team 992, consisting of over 360 soldiers from various battalions under LID 99, was deployed to the Padan Village-tract area in Ngape Township.

=== Kyaw Kyaw Thet's Engagement with the Arakan Army ===
As the commander of Strategic Team 992, Kyaw Kyaw Thet personally oversaw his unit's response during an offensive launched by the Arakan Army near the Payakone Pagoda area. Facing intense combat, he made the decision to reposition his forces, a move that ultimately led to a breakdown in unit cohesion. Under his command, the unit suffered heavy casualties, with approximately 100 soldiers killed and another 100 wounded during the initial clashes—a situation exacerbated by a shortage of medical supplies.

On 31 January 2025, while retreating from advancing AA forces in the Gote See Yoe Village-tract area, Kyaw Kyaw Thet was injured by an artillery shell fired inadvertently by his own side. The injury contributed to the scattering of his forces, leaving him with only 20 surviving soldiers. In the ensuing chaos, Kyaw Kyaw Thet took personal responsibility for negotiating with the advancing Arakan Army, and after discussions, he ultimately surrendered his remaining unit at Point 1399.

=== Surrender and statements ===
Following his capture, Kyaw Kyaw Thet appeared in a video interview released on 11 February 2025, where he attributed the Myanmar military's battlefield losses to poor training, low morale, and weak combat skills. He stated:

“Our military has poor training, and the troops have low fighting spirit and weak combat skills. They also lack strong morale. Because of this, the military will not only lose to the AA, but will continue to be defeated in all battles, everywhere.”

The video was verified by the Arakan Army and initially shared on social media by Khit Thit Media.

=== Kyaw Kyaw Thet's Role in the Conflict ===
By early 2025, the Arakan Army had expanded its offensive under Operation 1027, seizing large areas in Rakhine State and advancing into parts of Ayeyarwady, Magwe, and Bago Regions. In response, the Myanmar military deployed units, including Strategic Team 992 under the command of Kyaw Kyaw Thet, to counter the AA's gains.

As the conflict escalated, Kyaw Kyaw Thet led his unit into battle in Ngape Township, where they suffered heavy losses. Facing mounting casualties and dwindling supplies, his leadership came under pressure. The worsening situation on the battlefield eventually led to his injury and surrender to the AA on 31 January 2025.

== See also ==
- Ngape clashes
- Dry Zone theater
- Rakhine offensive (2023–present)
