= Aunglan, Myanmar =

Aunglan အောင်လံမြို့
- Town
- Location in Burma
- Coordinates: 19°22′N 95°13′E
- Country: Myanmar
- Region: Magway Region
- District: Aunglan District
- Township: Aunglan Township

Area
  - Total: 8.58 sq mi (22.2 km^{2})

Population (2023)
  - Total: 57,395
- Time zone: UTC+6.30 (MMT)

Aunglan (Burmese: အောင်လံ, formerly known as Allanmyo & Myede) is the capital of Aunglan District and Aunglan Township in southeastern Magway Region, Myanmar.

== History ==
Aunglan was a new city formed moving from Myede. After the second Anglo-Burmese war, the south of Myede Township was annexed by the British and the north was ruled by the Myanmar King. While Myede and Aunglan remain separate towns, they are counted together for administrative and statistical purposes.

According to the 2014 census, the population was 52,454. 47.5% of total population is male and 52.5% is female. Prior to 2022, it was part of the Thayet District, where it was the largest settlement in the district. It is a port on the left (eastern) bank of the Irrawaddy, across and just north of Thayetmyo, between the cities of Pyay (Prome), Taungdwingyi (Prome) and Magway.

== Transport ==
Since 1999, it has been served by a branch line of Myanmar Railways.

== See also ==
- Transport in Myanmar
