= Anyar =

Anyar may refer to:

- Dry Zone (Myanmar), also known as Anyar
  - Anyar theater, a theater of war in the Dry Zone
- Anyar (film), a 2003 Indian film
- Anyar, the official name of the town of Anyer, Banten, Indonesia
