= Phone Maw Shwe =

Chief Minister of Magway Region of Myanmar from 2011 to 2016

- ဘုန်းမော်ရွှေ

1st Chief Minister of Magway Region
- In office 30 March 2011 – 30 March 2016
- Succeeded by: Aung Moe Nyo

Representative of Magway Region Hluttaw
- In office 2011 – 30 March 2016
- Preceded by: Office established
- Constituency: Minbu Township No. 1

Personal details
- Born: Burma
- Party: Union Solidarity and Development Party

Military service
- Branch/service: Myanmar Army
- Rank: Colonel

Phone Maw Shwe (Burmese: ဘုန်းမော်ရွှေ) is a former Chief Minister of Magway Region, Myanmar, serving from 2011 to 2016. He is a former chairman of the Magway Division Peace and Development Council.

A member of the Union Solidarity and Development Party, he was elected to represent Minbu Township Constituency No. 1 as a Magway Region Hluttaw representative in the 2010 Burmese general election.
