= People's Revolution Alliance (Magway) =

Rebel force in Magway, Myanmar

- ပြည်သူ့တော်လှန်ရေးတပ်ပေါင်းစု (မကွေး)
- Founded: 28 March 2021
- Dates active: 28 March 2021 – present
- Country: Myanmar
- Allegiance: Myanmar
- Active regions: Magway Region: Ngape; Minhla; Sidoktaya; India-Myanmar border
- Ideology: Federalism; Democracy

The People's Revolution Alliance (Magway) (Burmese: ပြည်သူ့တော်လှန်ရေးတပ်ပေါင်းစု (မကွေး) or လူထုတော်လှန်ရေး မဟာမိတ်အင်အားစု (မကွေး)) is a defense force in Myanmar fighting against the Myanmar military junta. It was formed in response to the 2021 Myanmar coup d'état and is operating in Magway Region, Myanmar.

== History ==
The Chief Commander of the PRA, Kyaw Ko Shein, was active in civil organizations that carried out democratic rights before the military took power. Kyaw Ko Shein and local youth held peaceful protests against the military coup in the Magway Region, and the military council violently suppressed it. After the junta's violent clashes and killings, they decided to start an armed resistance.

On 7 April 2023, the PRA-Magway fired missiles at the junta-controlled No. 10 Defense Industry factory, burning the factory and killing some soldiers. The operation was supported militarily by the People's Defense Force and Chinland Defense Force groups in the area.

== Objectives ==
The PRA's stated objectives are to end all tyranny, including Myanmar's military dictatorship, to build a federal democratic state based on human existence, dignity freedom, and the right to create one's own destiny, to promote a new society with economic justice, political justice, and social justice.
