= Alechaung =

- Location in Burma
- Coordinates: 19°22′0″N 94°54′0″E
- Country: Burma
- Division: Magway Region
- Township: Mindon Township
- Elevation: 292 ft (89 m)

Population (2005)
  - Religions: Buddhism
- Time zone: UTC+6.30 (MST)

Alechaung (Burmese: အလယ်ချောင်း) is a village in the Magway Region of north-west Myanmar. It lies in Mindon Township in the Thayet District.
