= U Kyin U =

Burmese dramatist

- ဦးကြင်ဥ
- Born: c. 1773; Sinbaungwe, Kingdom of Burma
- Died: c. 1838
- Occupation: Writer
- Writing career
- Language: Burmese
- Period: Konbaung Dynasty

U Kyin U (Burmese: ဦးကြင်ဥ; c. 1773 – c. 1838) was one of Burma's most prominent 19th century dramatists, along with U Ponnya.

Kyin U was born c. 1773 in Sinbaungwe in present-day Magway Region. He likely began his career as a song and speech writer for stage characters. Kyin U gained prominence in the latter years of King Bagyidaw's reign, and his plays were composed after the First Anglo-Burmese War of 1824. He retired after the end of Bagyidaw's reign, and returned to Sinbaungwe.

Kyin U penned several court plays, primarily based on the Buddhist jatakas. Of the six court plays he wrote, 2 have been lost. His plays dealt with the sociopolitical aspects of early 19th century Burmese history. He was also known for his songs and poetry. Many of his songs are published in an anthology called Thachin Padetha.

== List of works ==
- Mahawthada
- Papahein
- Waythandaya
- Devakumbhan
- Winganda
