= Technological University, Magway =

Higher education institute in Magway Region, Myanmar

Coordinates: 20°11′57″N 95°00′28″E

- နည်းပညာတက္ကသိုလ် (မကွေး)
- Former name: Government Technological College(Mgw)
- Motto: Industrialization Empowers Country စက်မှုစွမ်းအား ပြည်ထွန်းကား
- Type: Public
- Established: 2007; 19 years ago
- Affiliations: Ministry of Education
- Principal: Mya Nandar Lwin
- Location: Magway, Myanmar

Technological University, Magway (Burmese: နည်းပညာတက္ကသိုလ် (မကွေး); also known as TU (Magway)) is a public university located near the village of Kanbyar near Magway in the Magway Region of Myanmar. The university campus spans 28.82 acres.

== History ==
The university was founded on 27 December 1999 as Government Technological College, Magway (GTC Magway), offering two-year diplomas in vocational studies and three-year Bachelor of Technology (B-Tech) programs. On 20 January 2007, it became a Technological University offering undergraduate degree programs in Civil Engineering, Electrical Communication Engineering, Electrical Power Engineering, Mechanical Engineering, Mechatronic Engineering, and Chemical Engineering.

About 40 students from the university were arrested on 28 February 2021 following a peaceful protest in Magway Township. A second-year student from Technological University, Magway, was shot dead. Some students including the former chair of the Magway Technological University Students' Union were released on 19 October 2021 after eight months in prison. The university was re-opened by the military junta in January 2022.
