= Tun Min =

Burmese bodybuilder

- ထြန္းမင္း
- Born: 1970 (age 55–56); Yaw, Magway Region, Myanmar
- Occupation: Bodybuilder
- Awards: 2017 Asian Bodybuilding Championships (silver medal)

Tun Min (also known as Maung Myanmar Tun Min) is a Myanmar's two-time gold medal winning professional bodybuilder. He won first prize in the 65-kilo men's freehand competition and silver medals in Asian Bodybuilding and Fitness Championships in 2017.

== Early life ==
Tun was born on 1970 in Yaw, Magwe Region, Myanmar.

== Competitive placings ==
- 2018 11th World Body Building and Physique Sports Champions (winner)
- 2018 Asian Body Building And Physique Sports Championship 2018 (Silver Medal)
- 2017 The 51st Asian Bodybuilding and Physique Sports Championships (Gold Medal — Men Bodybuilding 65 kg)
- 2012 WBPF World Championships (4th Runner Up— Men Bodybuilding 60 kg)
- SEA Championships (1st Runner Up— Men Bodybuilding 60 kg)
- 2011 WBPF World Men's Bodybuilding Championships (3rd Runner Up— Men Bodybuilding 60 kg)
- Asian and World Bodybuilding & Physique Sports Championships (2nd Runner Up— Asian Men Bodybuilding 60 kg)
