= Myathalun Pagoda =

Prominent Buddhist Pagoda in Magway, Myanmar

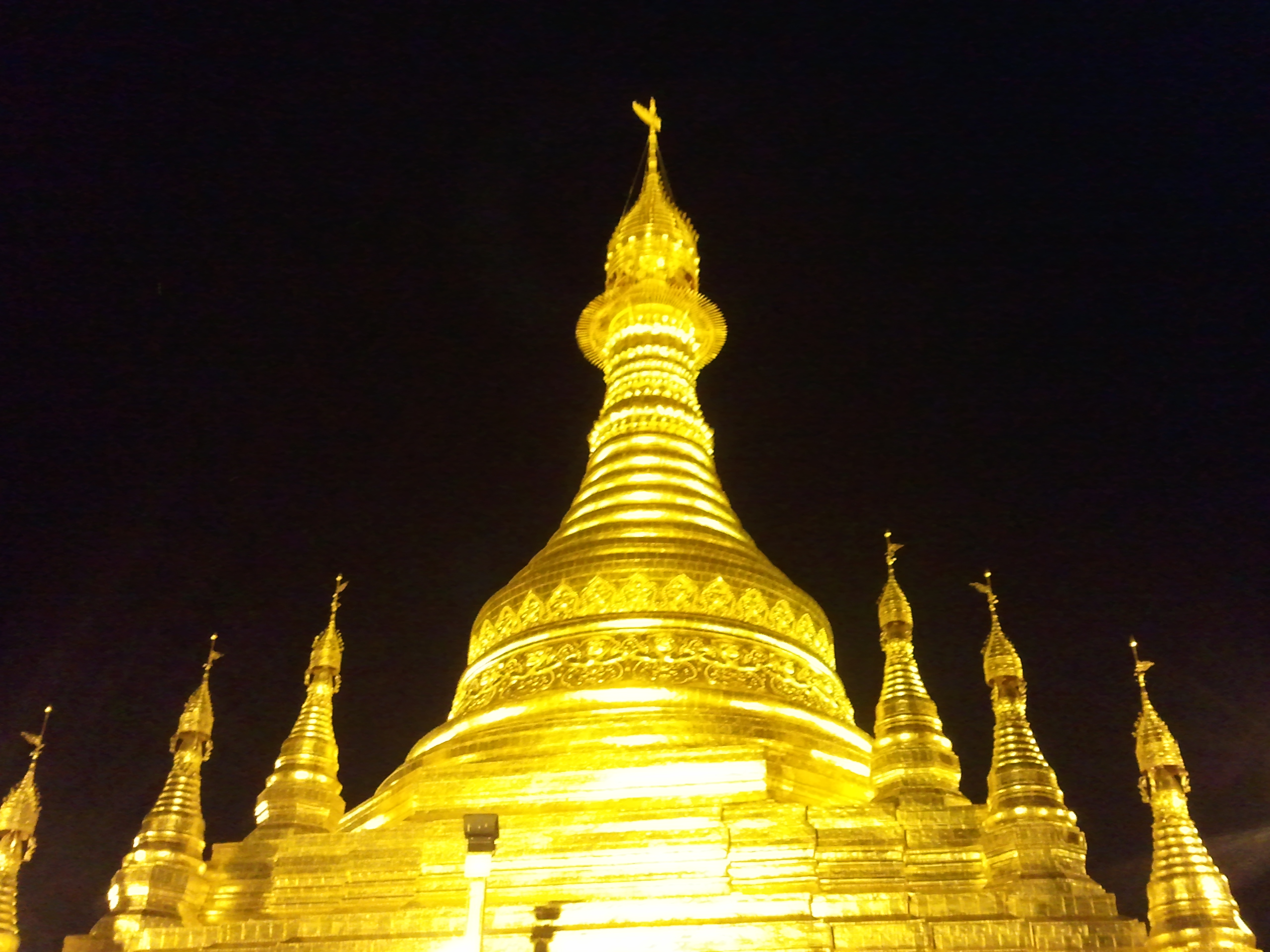
- Myathalun Pagoda

- Location within Myanmar

Religion
- Affiliation: Theravada Buddhism

Location
- Location: Magway, Magway Region,
- Country: Myanmar (Burma)
- Coordinates: 20°10′11″N 94°55′2″E

The Mya Tha Lun Pagoda (Burmese: မြသလွန်ဘုရား) is a Buddhist pagoda and a major landmark of Magway, Myanmar, located on the riverside of the Irrawaddy.

== History ==
According to legend, the pagoda was initially built by a wealthy man called U Baw Gyaw and his wife. It was raised from its original height of 55.5 feet (16.9 m) to a height of 87 feet (27 m) by King Saw Lu (1077–1084) of Bagan. The pagoda faced a huge earthquake in 1847 and it was rebuilt by the mayor of Magway, Min Din Min Hla Kyaw Gaung to the present height of approximately 104 feet (32 m). It is famous because The Bed of Buddha is placed inside it.
