= Sidoktaya =

Town in Magway Division, Myanmar

Sidoktaya စေတုတ္တရာမြို့
- Town
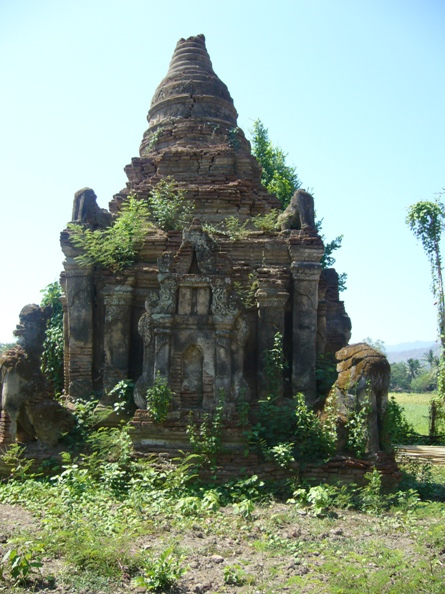
- Ancient Pagoda in Sidoktaya

- Location in Burma
- Coordinates: 20°27′N 94°15′E
- Country: Myanmar
- Region: Magway Region
- District: Minbu District
- Township: Sidoktaya Township
- Time zone: UTC+6.30 (MST)

Sidoktaya, also Sitoktaya or Setoketaya (Burmese: စေတုတ္တရာမြို့) is a town and seat of Sidoktaya Township in Minbu District of Magway Division, situated in middle west region of Burma. It is bordered with Salin township to the east, with Pwintbyu township to the south-east, with Ngape township to the south, with Ann township, Minbya township (Rakhine State) to the west, with Kanpelek township (Chin State) to the north-west and with Saw township to the north.

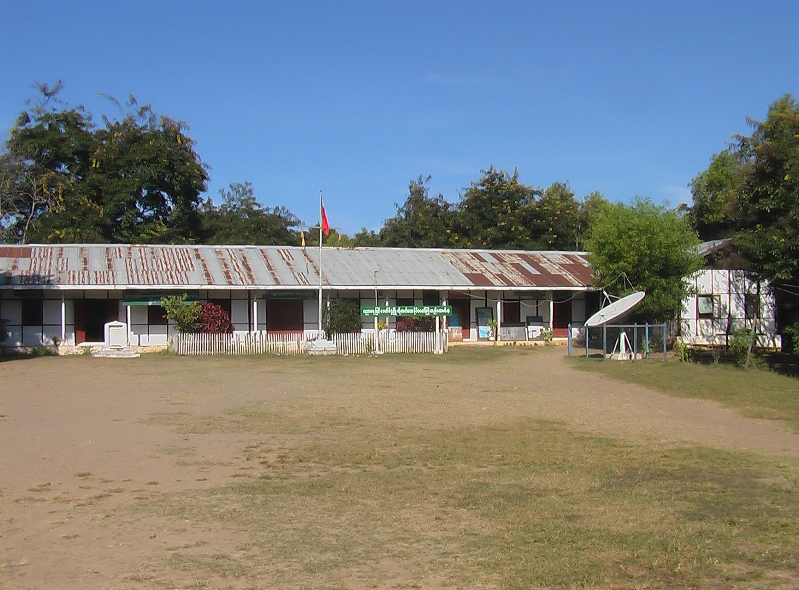
Basic Education High School (Aahtaka Sidoktaya) in Sidoktaya, Magway Division, Myanmar (Burma)

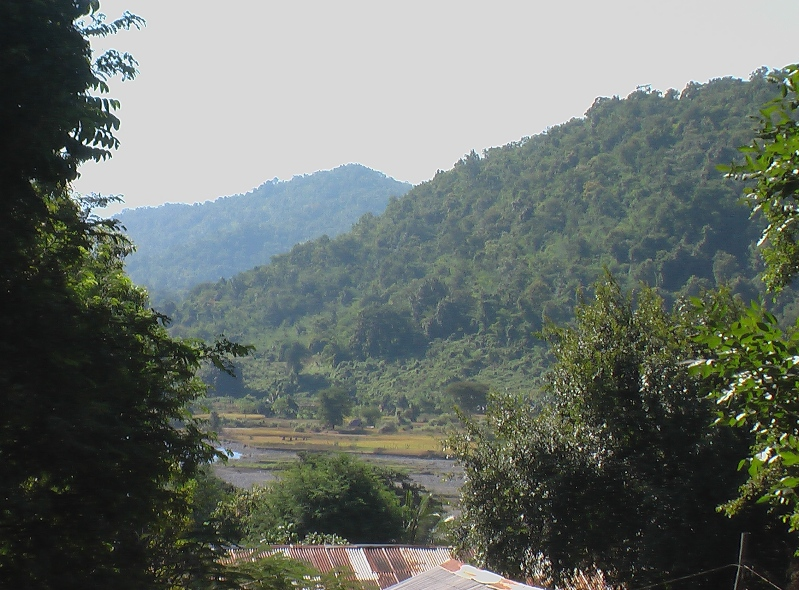
Mountains and Forest in Sidoktaya, Magway Division, Myanmar (Burma)

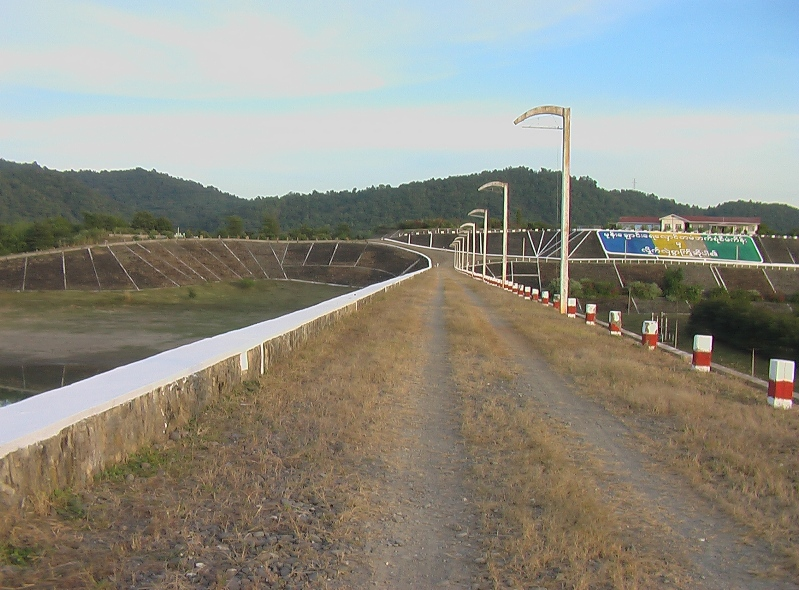
Mone Dam in Sidoktaya, Magway Division, Myanmar (Burma)

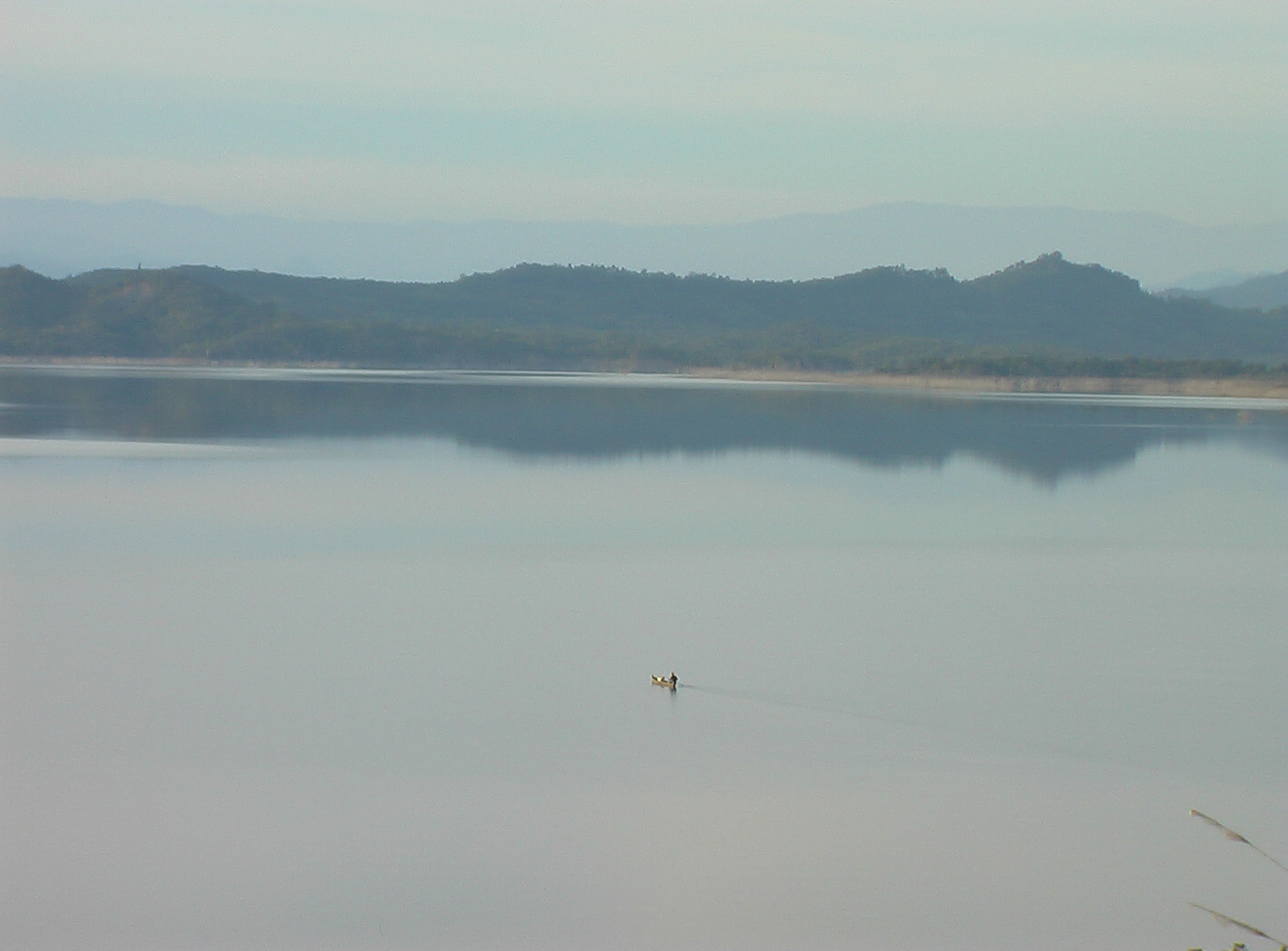
The Waters by Mone Dam in Sidoktaya, Magway Division, Myanmar (Burma)

== History ==
Sidoktaya is one of the oldest ancient towns in Myanmar. It is established by Prince Yazakumar (a. Min Zaya Khittaya or Min Thiri Khittaya) in Year 460 (Myanmar Era) (about 1098 A.D.). Now it is over 900 years of age. there are many archaeological places including Si-kyek-taung Pagoda, Aung-kyar Thiri Pagoda, and Sutaungpyi Pagoda. The ancient city wall had been found buried in some places, but they are no longer can be found in modern day Sidoktaya.

== Geography ==
Sidoktaya is situated at Latitude (lat): 20°25'29"N and Longitude (lon): 94°15'36"E and Elevation (approx.): 108m. The area is about 1,025 square miles (2,650 km^{2}), and it is the second largest area township next to Taungdwingyi township in the Magway division. Mone Creek which is the largest in the sub region flows through the Sidoktaya township. This creek is started from Mount Khaw Nu Thon which is the highest mount in the Chin Hills. The area is very mountainous and most of the mountains are above 3,000 feet (910 m).

== Demographical Condition ==
About 80% of the population are Chins and 20% are Bamars and there are also lots of mixed heritage individuals. Almost all are Theravada Buddhists.

== Administration ==
Sidoktaya is a township level town and the township consists of 46 village tracts (total of 120 villages). The large villages include Pa-Aing, Kyee-Wa, Dabwin, Buywa, Ohnwah, Khwemalaung and Myaynigone.

== Transportation ==
As it is a hilly region, there is only one main land road to Salin (37 miles). airports close to Sidoktaya, Myanmar are: the closest airport is KYP - Kyaukpyu, located 135.8 km south west of Sidoktaya. More nearby airports include AKY - Sittwe 148.1 km west, SNW - Thandwe 220.3 km south, MDL - Mandalay Intl 226.8 km north east. There are no railways and flight to Sidoktaya.

== Production ==
The main products of Sidoktaya township are teak woods and bamboo. Annual production of bamboo is over 300,000 bamboos. Although there are agriculture, the area is only a small amount. The main crops are paddy, sesame, corn, vegetables and some kinds of beans. Industries include only rice mills and sesame mills.

== Education ==
There is only one Basic Education High School in Sidoktaya, and five Basic Education Middle Schools, and 98 Basic Education Primary Schools.
