= Minhla Fortress =

- မင်းလှခံတပ်
- Minhla in Myanmar

Site information
- Type: Fortress
- Open to the public: Yes

Location
- Location within Myanmar
- Coordinates: 19.970791°N 95.043492°E

Site history
- Built: 1860
- Fate: Mainly intact
- Events: Third Anglo-Burmese War

Minhla Fortress (Burmese: မင်းလှခံတပ်) is a historic fortress located in Minhla, Magway Region, Myanmar.

The fortress was built in 1860-1861 to defend the Konbaung dynasty's territory following the Second Anglo-Burmese War. It was built with the assistance of French and Italian engineers, including Captain Molinari, an Italian engineer, along the western bank of the Irrawaddy River.

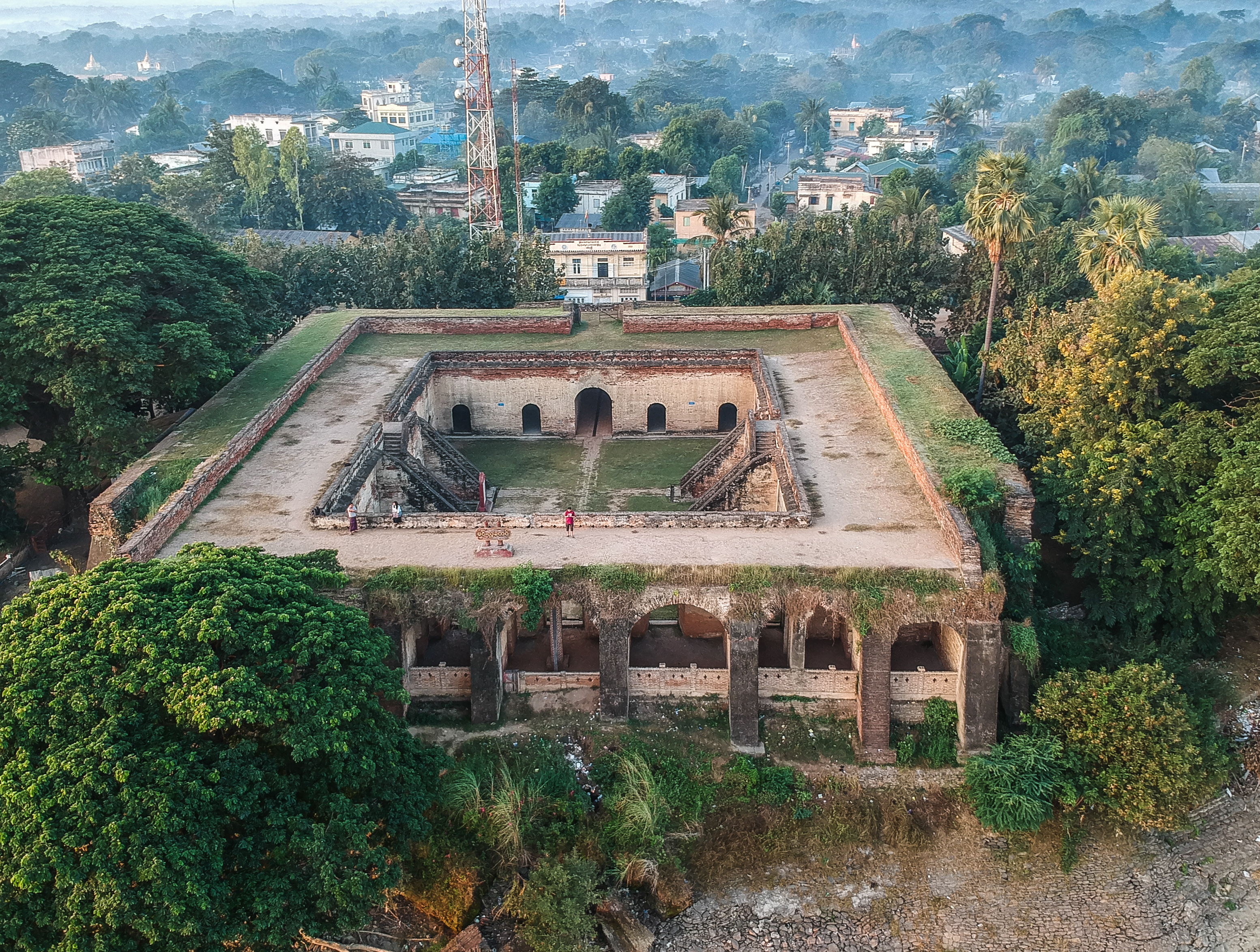

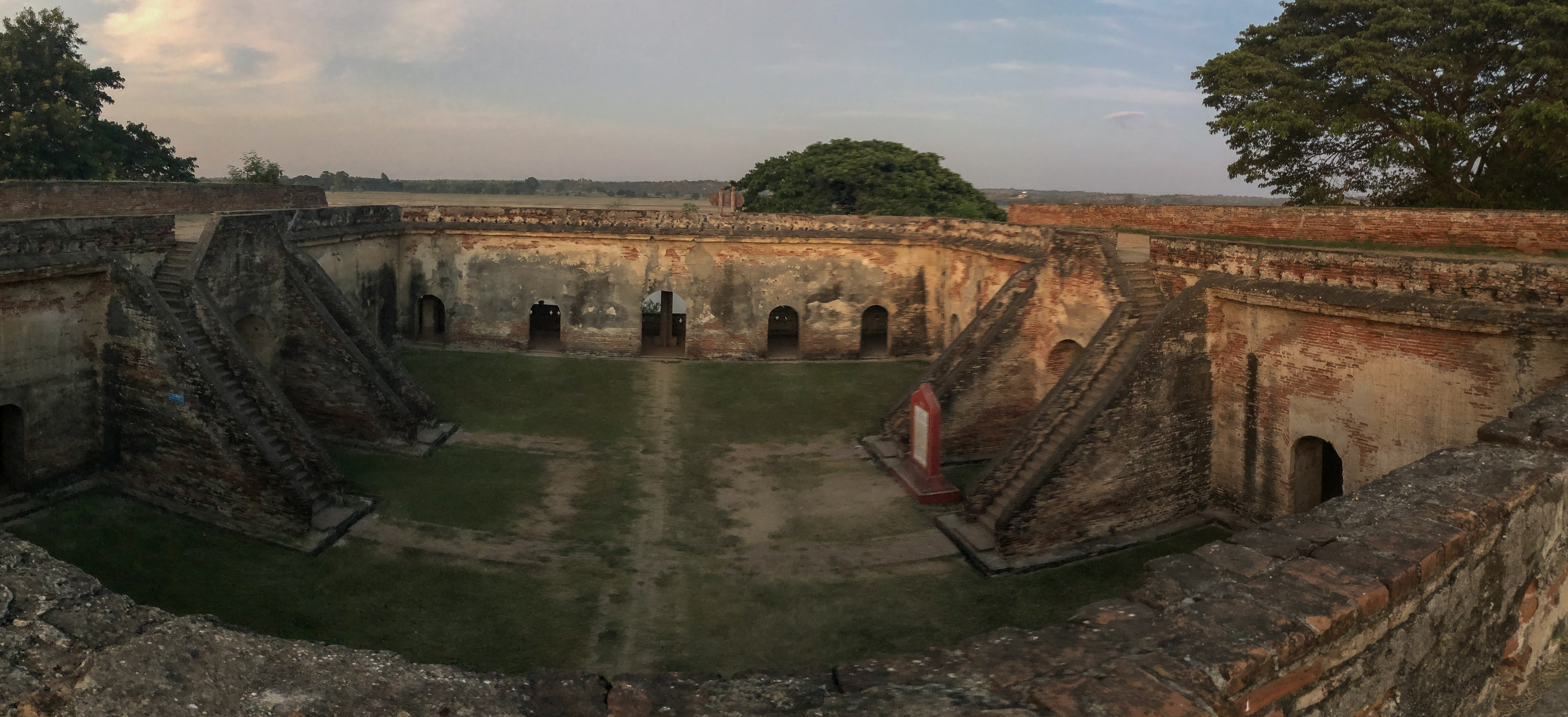

This fort, along with the Gwegyaung Fortress, was used as a defensive point of resistance by Burmese troops during the Third Anglo-Burmese War in 1885.

== See also ==
- Third Anglo-Burmese War
