= Sidoktaya Township =

Sidoktaya Township စေတုတ္တရာ မြို့နယ်
- Township
- Location in Minbu district

- Location within Myanmar
- Coordinates: 20°26′48″N 94°14′44″E
- Country: Myanmar
- Region: Magway Region
- District: Minbu District

Population (2014)
  - Total: 47,526
- Time zone: UTC+6:30 (MMT)

Sidoktaya Township (Burmese: စေတုတ္တရာ မြို့နယ်) is a township of Minbu District in the Magway Region of Myanmar. The principal town is Sidoktaya.
