= Aunglan District =

District in Magway Region, Myanmar

Aunglan District အောင်လံခရိုင်
- Aunglan District (Red) in Magway Region
- Coordinates: 19.527°N 95.468°E
- Country: Myanmar
- Region: Magway Region
- Capital: Aunglan
- Time zone: MMT

Aunglan District (Burmese: အောင်လံခရိုင်) is a district in Magway Region, Myanmar. It was split from Thayet District on 30 April 2022 and contains two townships. Its district seat is Aunglan.

== Townships ==
Townships in Aunglan District:

- Aunglan Township
- Sinbaungwe Township
