= Thayet =

- City
- Location in Burma
- Coordinates: 19°19′30″N 95°10′59″E
- Country: Myanmar
- Region: Magway Region
- District: Thayet District
- Township: Thayet Township

Population (2014)
  - Urban: 20,251
- Time zone: UTC+6.30 (MST)

Thayet (Burmese: သရက်, MLCTS: sarak; pronounced [θəjɛʔ]) is a capital city in Thayet District of Magway Region in central Myanmar. It is a port on the right (western) bank of the Irrawaddy River, across and just south of Allanmyo, between Pyay (Prome) and Magway. Thayet is the administrative seat of both Thayet District and Thayet Township. As of 2014, the population was 20,251 in the city proper.

== Geography ==
On the west are the Arakan Mountains, and on the east the Pegu Range, and the face of the country is otherwise broken by low ranges of hills, many of which have no vegetation. The greater part of the district is wooded, and the ranges east and west are covered with forests. The chief river is the Irrawaddy, which traverses Thayet from north to south.

Several salt and hot springs exist. The principal wild animals are elephants, rhinoceros, tigers, leopards, black bears and wild hog. During the 19th century, the chief products were rice, cotton, oil-seeds and tobacco; cutch was also very abundant, and the manufacture of the dye-stuff was carried on extensively. Three oil-wells were sunk in 1883 at Pedaukpin, but they were found unprofitable and abandoned.

== History ==
On the annexation of Pegu by the British in 1852–53, Thayet (then called Thayetmyo) was formed into a subdivision of Prome district; and in 1870 it was erected into a separate jurisdiction and placed under a deputy-commissioner. It was formerly in the Irrawaddy division of Lower Burma, but was transferred to Upper Burma for administrative purposes in 1896. In the early 20th century, the area contained the wing of a British battalion and a local regiment.

== Industry ==
In the 1960s limestone quarries a few miles south of Thayet were developed to supply the town's cement factory.
