= Mindon, Myanmar =

Mindon
- Town
- Location in Burma
- Coordinates: 19°16′57″N 94°47′40″E
- Country: Myanmar
- Region: Magway Region
- District: Thayet District
- Township: Mindon Township
- Time zone: UTC+6.30 (MST)

Mindon is a town in Burma. It is the capital of Mindon Township of Thayet District in the Magway Region.
