= Magway University =

University in Myanmar

- မကွေး တက္ကသိုလ်
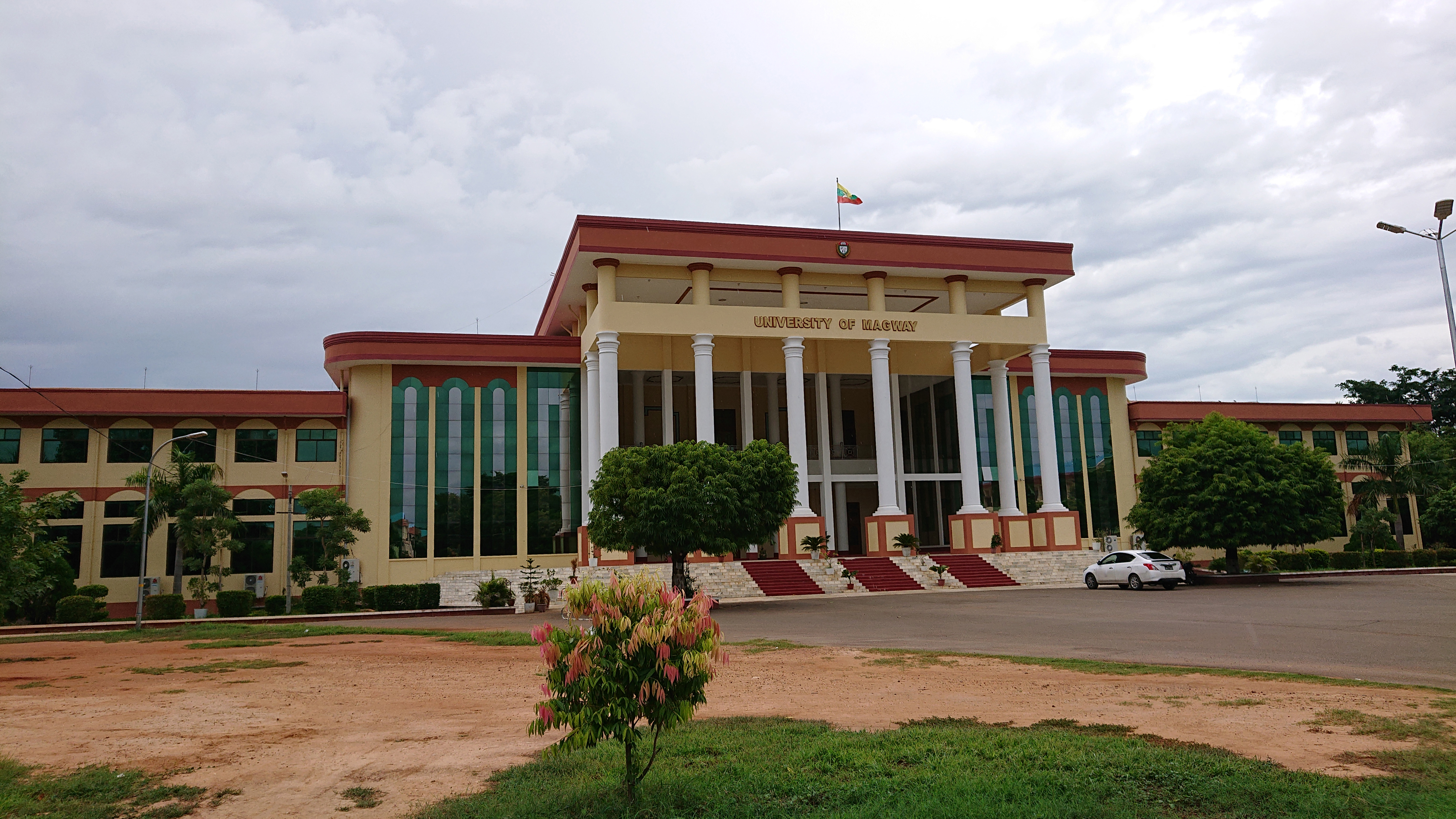
- Magway University's main hall building
- Former names: Magway College (1955); Magway Degree College (1982)
- Motto: စိတ်ဓာတ် စည်းကမ်း ပညာ သမာဓိ
- Type: Public
- Established: June 5, 1955; 71 years ago
- Affiliations: Ministry of Education
- Rector: Dr. Khin Kay Khine (In June 2025, following a review process and administrative consultations, the Ministry of Education formally confirmed Dr. Khin Kay Khine as the Rector of Magway University, making her the official successor to Dr. Khin Maung Oo, after serving several months in an acting capacity and the first woman to hold the position in the university’s history, marking a significant milestone in the institution’s leadership)
- Location: Magway, Magway Region, Myanmar; 20°8′10″N 94°56′6″E

Magway University (Burmese: မကွေး တက္ကသိုလ်, pronounced [məɡwé tɛʔkəθò]) is located in Magway, Myanmar.

== History ==
On June 5, 1955, the College of Magway was founded. In 1982, it was promoted to the Degree College of Magway. It was promoted to the University of Magway on December 20, 1994. From the year 2013, the degrees were given at the convocation hall, located on its campus.

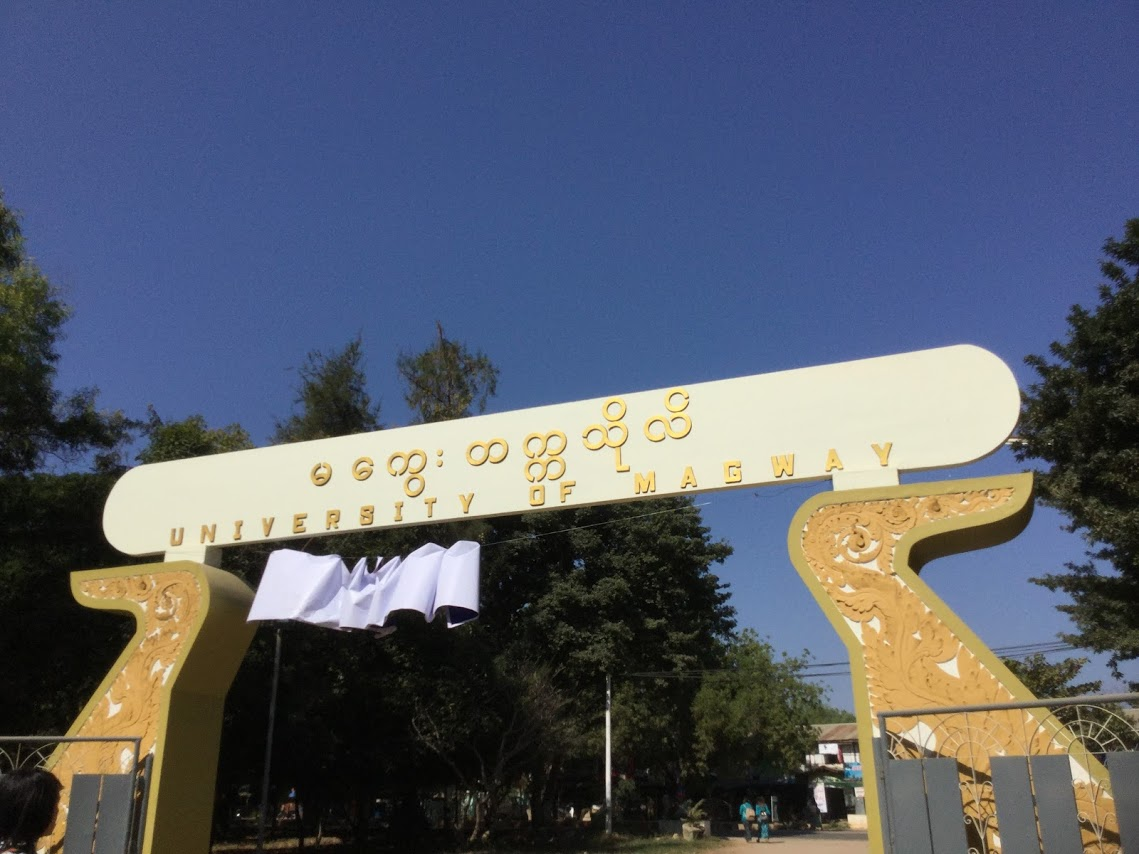
Magway University

== Location ==
It is located on Taungdwin Road, in the south part of Magway. It comprises two campuses, namely the main and the extension. Generally, science students study at the main campus and art students do in the extension. Now, many new buildings, named Shwe Gant Gaw, were built. English Major specialization students are studying their lessons at Shwe Gan Gaw (1). The convocation hall, the library, the recreation centre and the research centre are located in the extension campus. Department of Philosophy is considered the most beautiful building of the university.
