= Aunglan Township =

Aunglan Township အောင်လံမြို့နယ် Myayde Township
- Township
- Location in Thayet district
- Coordinates: 19°14′N 95°34′E
- Country: Myanmar
- Region: Magway Region
- District: Aunglan District
- Capital: Aunglan

Area
  - Total: 2,677.1 km^{2} (1,033.65 sq mi)

Population (2023)
  - Total: 245,965
  - Density: 91.8760/km^{2} (237.958/sq mi)
- Time zone: UTC+6.30 (MMT)

Aunglan Township (Burmese: အောင်လံမြို့နယ်), formerly Myayde Township (Burmese: မြေထဲမြို့နယ်) is a township of Aunglan District in southern Magway Region, Myanmar. Its administrative seat is Aunglan. It is the southeasternmost township in Magway Region. The township has two towns, Aunglan and Myede with a total of 12 urban wards as well as 246 villages grouped into 91 village tracts.

== Borders ==
Aunglan Township is bordered by:

- Sinbaungwe Township to the north;
- Yedashe Township of Bago Region to the east;
- Paukkaung Township and Pyay Township of Bago Region to the south; and
- Kamma Township and Thayet Township to the west.

== Transport ==
Since 1999, it has been served by a branch line of Myanmar Railways.
