= Minbu Township =

Coordinates: 20.1833°N 94.8667°E

Minbu Township မင်းဘူး မြို့နယ်
- Township
- Location in Minbu district
- Country: Myanmar
- Division: Magway Division
- District: Minbu District
- Time zone: UTC+6:30 (MMT)

Minbu Township (Burmese: မင်းဘူး မြို့နယ်) is a township of Minbu District in the Magway Region of Myanmar. The principal town is Minbu.

The township is home to the Shwe Settaw Pagoda, which holds an annual pagoda festival from the fifth waning day of Tabodwe to the Burmese New Year, attracting 100,000 pilgrims nationwide.

== Geology ==
Rocks belonging to the Pegu Group, dated to Paleogene and Neogene times, are well-exposed in the western part of Minbu Township, where they form the western margin of the Minbu Basin and the Prome Embayment. This margin extends from the western part of Pakokku District south through Minbu Township and then into Mindon Township to the south.

The two main geological formations in the Pegu Group in this area are the Pyawbwe Formation and the Okhmintaung Formation. The Pyawbwe Formation, which is dated to Neogene times, makes up the upper layer. Below that is the Okhmintaung Formation, which is dated to Paleogene times. An unconformity (specifically a disconformity) separates these two layers; it consists of erosional surface contact between them. Both formations are well-exposed in a stream north of the village of Pyawbwe and along the Mann Chaung stream between the villages of Uyin and Kodaung.

The Okhmintaung Formation generally consists of massive- to thick-bedded sandstone, with lesser amounts of siltstone, thin conglomeratic sandstone, and thin-bedded mudstone. Fossils of gastropods and shell fragments are found in the sandstone bed. In the upper part of the Okhmintaung Formation, there are features like evaporites and gypsum.

The Pyawbwe Formation primarily consists of shale, which is poorly bedded and relatively soft and ranges from grey to bluish-grey in colour. Thick-bedded sandy shale is intercalated in this formation and ranges from grey to yellowish in colour. The lower part of the Pyawbwe Formation is mainly composed of relatively harder grey to brownish-grey shale, which is intercalated with thin-bedded, fine-grained, yellowish-grey sandstone.

Based on the unconformity between the Okhmintaung and Pyawbwe Formations, and the absence of certain nannoplankton fossils in these rocks, it seems that the sea receded in the Minbu area at the end of the Paleogene, which is consistent with the general theory of a global drop in sea levels at that time. Sea levels then rose and submerged the area again in the Neogene.

Based on fossils found in the Okhmintaung and Pyawbwe Formations, it seems that the Minbu area was a shallow marine shelf environment in Paleogene and Neogene times. In particular, the algae family Braarudosphaeraceae is an especially prominent indicator of near-shore conditions. Sandstone deposits in the Okhmintaung Formation likely represent tidal channel deposits, while intercalated mudstone and sandstone deposits inn the Pyawbwe Formations likely represent a sub-tidal environment.
