= Magway Region Government =

- မကွေးတိုင်းဒေသကြီးအစိုးရအဖွဲ့

- Flag of Magway Region

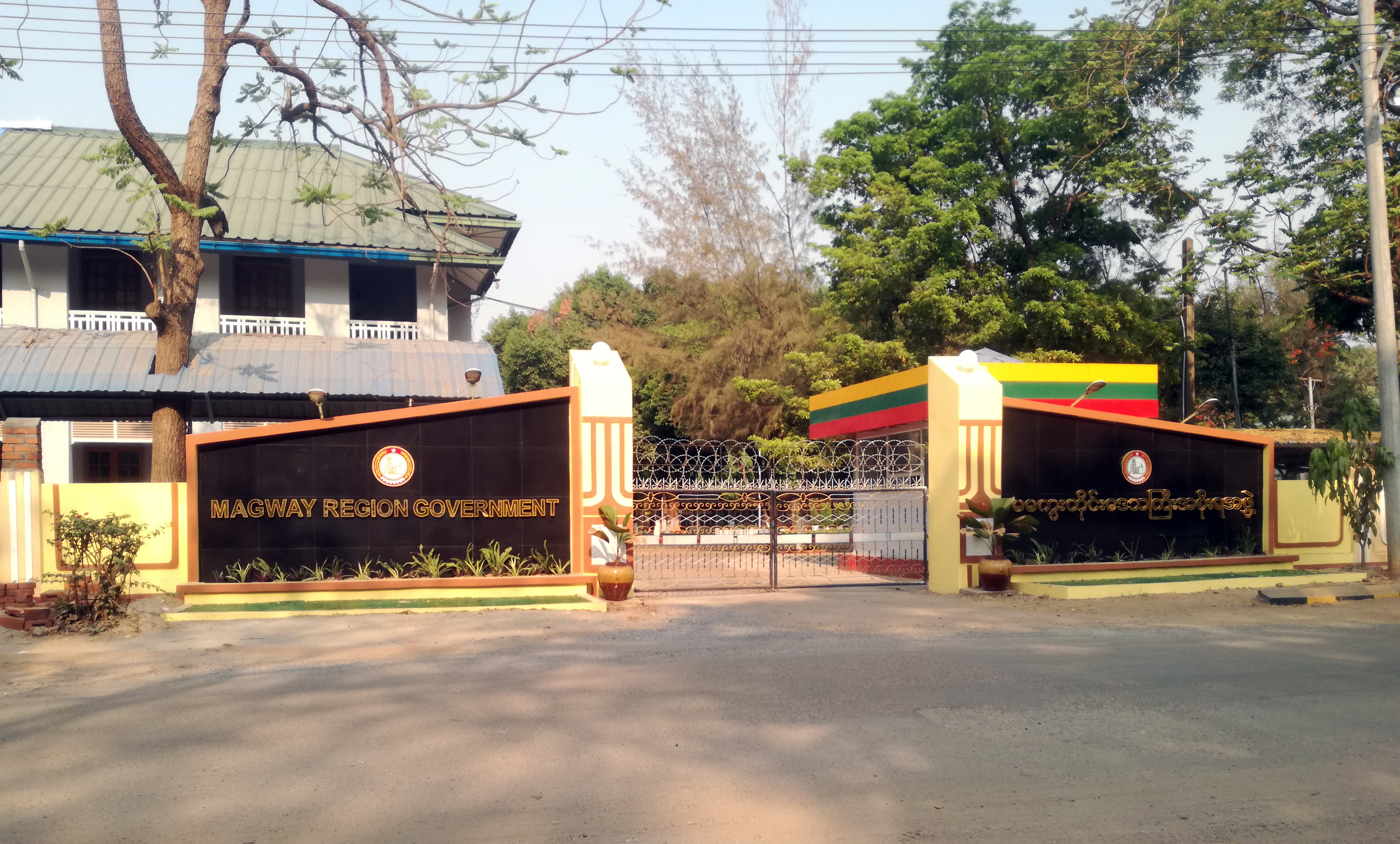
- Office of the Magway Region Government

Government overview
- Formed: 30 March 2011
- Jurisdiction: Magway Region Hluttaw
- Headquarters: Magway, Magway Region
- Government executive: Tint Lwin, Chief Minister
- Parent department: Government of Myanmar
- Website: magway.gov.mm

Magway Region Government is the cabinet of Magway Region. The cabinet is led by the chief minister, Tint Lwin.

== Cabinet (August 2021–present) ==
No.	Name	Portfolio
(1)	Tint Lwin	Chief Minister
(2)	Kyaw Kyaw Lin, Col.	Minister of Security and Border Affairs
(3)	Aung Shaine	Minister of Business
(4)	Sai Myint Aye	Minister of Natural Resources
(5)	Soe Myint Paing	Minister of Social Welfare
(6)	Thura Thwan Ko Ko, Police Col,	Minister of Road Transport
(7)	U Myint Swe	Minister of Labour, Immigration and Population
(8)	Khin Maung Aye, Dr.	Minister of Social Affairs
(9)	Tun Khin	Minister of Ethnic Affairs
