= Minhla, Magway =

Coordinates: 19°58′N 95°03′E

Minhla is a town in Thayet District, Magway Region, of central Myanmar, on the right (west) bank of the Irrawaddy. It is the administrative seat of Minhla Township.

== Attractions ==
- Minhla Fortress
