= Pwintbyu Township =

Pwintbyu Township ပွင့်ဖြူ မြို့နယ်
- Township
- Location in Minbu district

- Location within Myanmar
- Coordinates: 20°21′48″N 94°40′10″E
- Country: Myanmar
- Division: Magway Region
- District: Minbu District

Population (2014)
  - Total: 163,692
- Time zone: UTC+6:30 (MMT)

Pwintbyu Township (Burmese: ပွင့်ဖြူ မြို့နယ်, also spelt Pwintphyu Township) is a township of Minbu District in the Magway Division of Myanmar. The principal town is Pwintbyu.

Kyeeohn Kyeewa multipurpose Dam Project implementation was started in 2002–2003. The first 37 megawatt-generator was operated in January 2012. Pwintbyu is home to Yepokgyi, a small village known for preserving a centuries-old hairstyle tradition.
