= Bamar People's Liberation Army =

Ethnic armed organisation in Myanmar

- ဗမာပြည်သူ့လွတ်မြောက်ရေးတပ်တော်
- Dates active: 17 April 2021 – present
- Active regions: Eastern Myanmar
- Ideology: Ethnic federalism
- Size: 1000+
- Website: bplarmy.com

The Bamar People's Liberation Army (BPLA) (Burmese: ဗမာပြည်သူ့လွတ်မြောက်ရေးတပ်တော်) is an ethnic armed organisation in Myanmar. It was founded on 17 April 2021 by a group of 17 people, including Maung Saungkha, a prominent Burmese poet and human rights activist who had participated in the 2021–2022 protests in Myanmar. The logo of the BPLA consists of nine peacock feathers arranged in a circle, a symbol of the last kings of Myanmar.

== Objectives ==
According to Saungkha, the objectives of the BPLA include "[ending] the dominance of Bamar Buddhists over other ethnic groups, "strengthen[ing] the unity of Myanmar's diverse ethnic groups under a federal democratic union", "ensuring that, if Aung San Suu Kyi is released from house arrest, no political compromises are made under the name of state stability, and recognising "a Bamar state or constituent unit based on Bamar identity in a future federal union". It also aims to ensure leadership roles for women and LGBTQ+ members.
