= Dry Zone (Myanmar) =

Geographical region of Myanmar

Townships within the Dry Zone Regions with territory included within the Dry Zone Townships and regions located wholly outside the Dry Zone

The Dry Zone or Anyar (Burmese: အညာ) is a region of Myanmar located in central Upper Myanmar. Nearly one third of Myanmar's population lives in the Dry Zone. It is the primary location of ethnic Bamar and has served as the power centre for governments throughout Myanmar's history, including modern military juntas.

The Dry Zone is named for its semi-arid climates and relatively little rainfall, caused by the Arakan Mountains preventing monsoons from reaching the region. As a result of these conditions, as well as agricultural and human effects, the Dry Zone has experienced significant deforestation, particularly following Myanmar became independent in 1948. In modern Myanmar, the Dry Zone is part of Magway, Mandalay, and Sagaing regions.

== Climate and geography ==
The Dry Zone contains a variety of climates ranging from semi-arid to semi-humid. The region receives comparatively little rainfall and frequently experiences dry spells during the Monsoon of South Asia and rainy seasons. This fact is owed to the Dry Zone being surrounded by the Arakan Mountains to the west and the Pegu Range to the south, as well as the Shan Hills to the east.

The Dry Zone is also home to several rivers, most importantly the Irrawaddy and its tributaries. During the monsoon, the Irrawaddy frequently floods, but in the Dry Zone it is otherwise mostly sanded off.

== Agriculture ==
The Dry Zone is the agricultural centre of Myanmar; two-thirds of Myanmar's arable land and 35% of its grain crops are located in the region, and additional economic activities include livestock rearing. The most widely planted crops are sesame, paddy, groundnut, pigeon peas, chickpeas, green gram and sorghum. However, as a result of low rainfall, climate change, and other human and agricultural activities (such as deforestation and overgrazing), economic conditions in the Dry Zone remain poor. Since 2021, as a result of the state-sponsored violence following the 2021 Myanmar coup d'état, increasing temperatures, the COVID-19 pandemic, and increasingly-poor harvests, a widespread exodus of Dry Zone residents to other areas of Myanmar has occurred. According to the World Food Programme in a survey prior to 2014, 27% of children in the Dry Zone are chronically malnourished.

== Political history ==
Traditionally, the Dry Zone has served as the heartland for many states located in present-day Myanmar. With its large population of ethnic Bamar, the Dry Zone has been referred to Myanmar's "heartland". Several historic dynasties, such as the Pagan Kingdom, Kingdom of Ava, and Konbaung dynasty, have relied on the region to exert political power. Authoritarian leader Ne Win unsuccessfully sought to settle Dry Zone residents in the eastern Shan State.

=== Since 2021 ===
The Dry Zone has been traditionally unaffected by the internal conflict in Myanmar due to the region's ethnic homogeneity and the Tatmadaw's lack of interest in the region. Typically, most conflicts have been focused around land disputes, agriculture, and, in more modern times, resource extraction by Chinese firms. However, with the beginning of the Myanmar civil war in 2021, residents of the Dry Zone have increasingly been drawn into the internal conflict in Myanmar. On one hand is the pro-junta Pyusawhti militias and members of pro-Tatmadaw groups, while on the other hand is the People's Defence Force, a loosely-connected group of guerrilla forces opposed to the junta.
