= Pwintbyu =

Pwintbyu ပွင့်ဖြူ
- Town
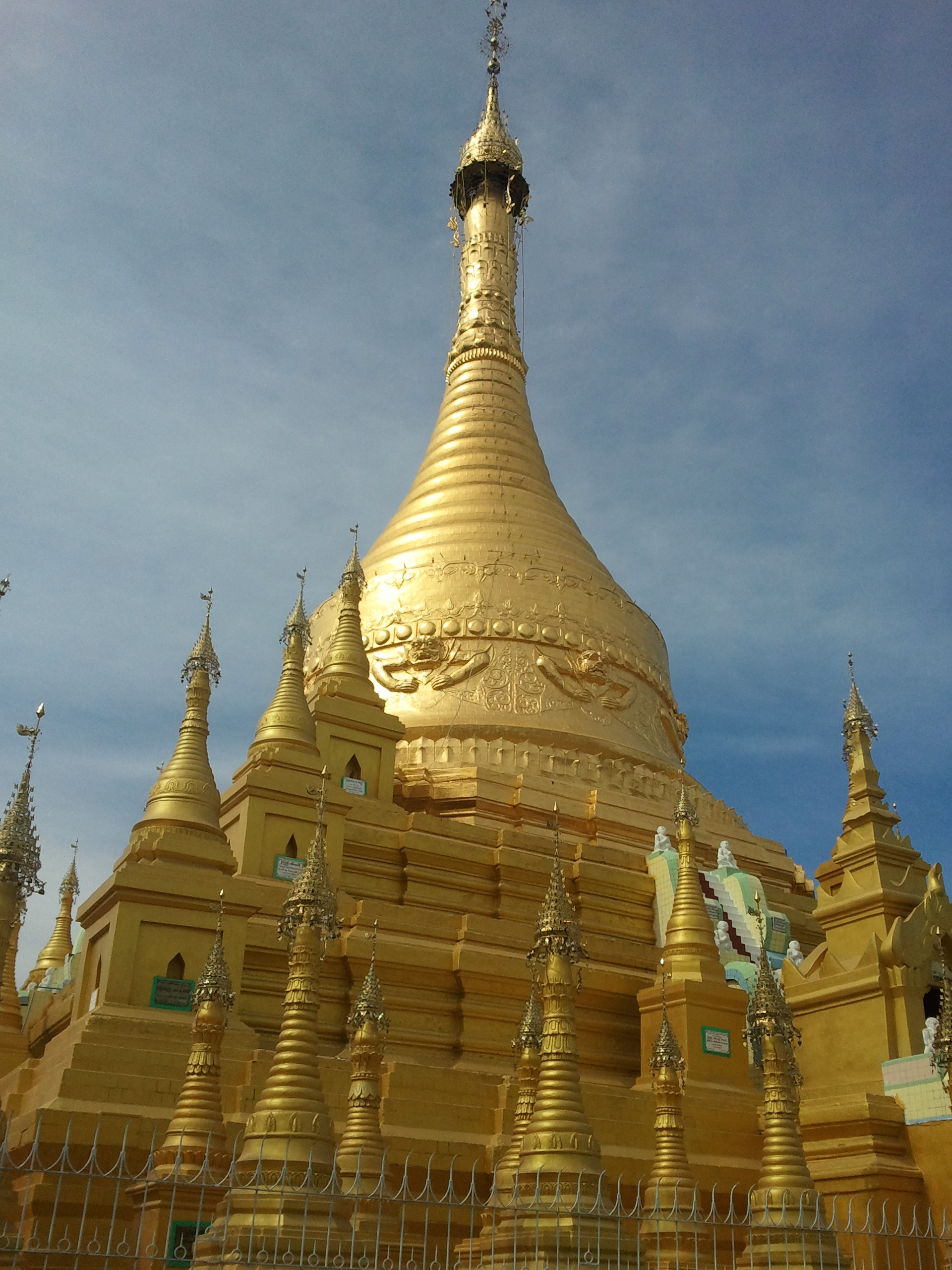
- Kyaungdawya Pagoda in Pwintbyu

- Location in Myanmar
- Coordinates: 20°22′N 94°40′E
- Country: Myanmar
- Division: Magway Region
- District: Minbu District
- Township: Pwintbyu Township
- Time zone: UTC+6.30 (MST)

PwintPhyu (Burmese: ပွင့်ဖြူမြို့) is the principal town of Pwintbyu Township in Minbu District in Magway Region of Myanmar. Which located near Shwe Sat Taw Pagoda.
