= Maung Saungkha =

Burmese human rights activist, military commander, and poet

- မောင်ဆောင်းခ
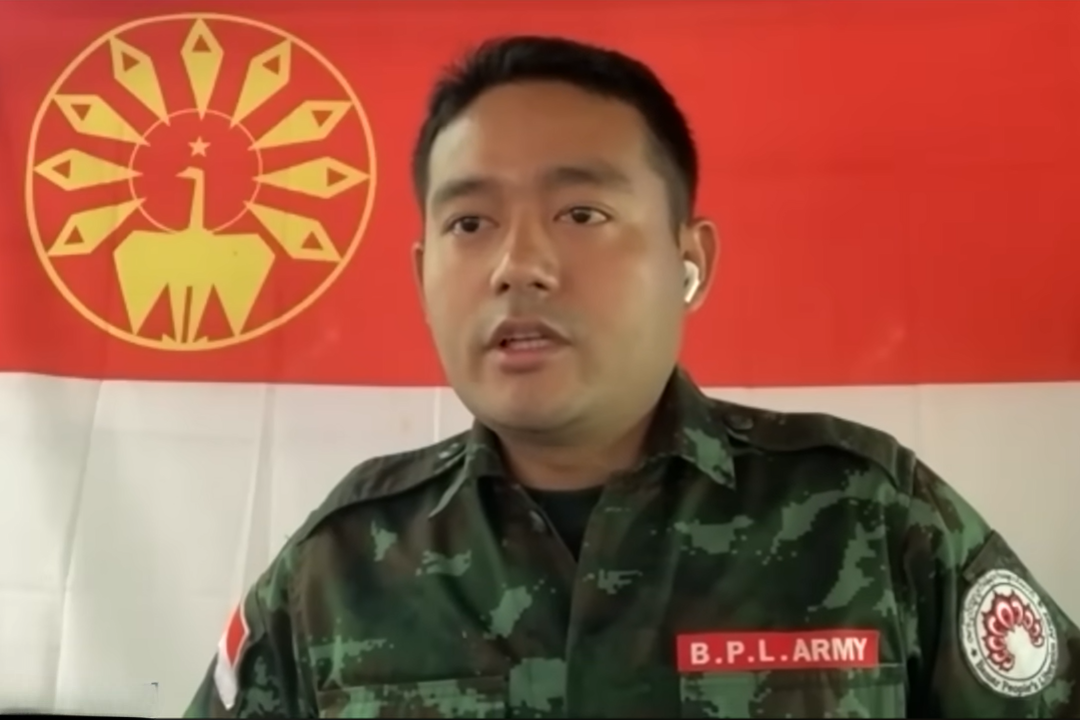
- Maung Saunghkha as leader of the Bamar People's Liberation Army in 2023
- Born: January 5, 1993 (age 33)
- Occupations: Army commander, poet, activist
- Organization: Bamar People's Liberation Army

Maung Saungkha, alternatively romanized as Maung Saung Kha, is a Burmese poet, human rights activist and chief commander of the Bamar People's Liberation Army.

== Early life and education ==
From 2010 to 2012, Saungkha studied chemical engineering in university.

== Career ==
=== Poetry ===
At university, Saungkha founded a club called the Poetry Lovers’ Association. The club soon attracted the attention of military surveillance, and the members were refused the right to wear the club's symbol on their graduation caps.

In 2016, he was sentenced to six months in prison for publishing "a poem about having a tattoo of [President Thein Sein] on his penis."

=== Human rights activism ===
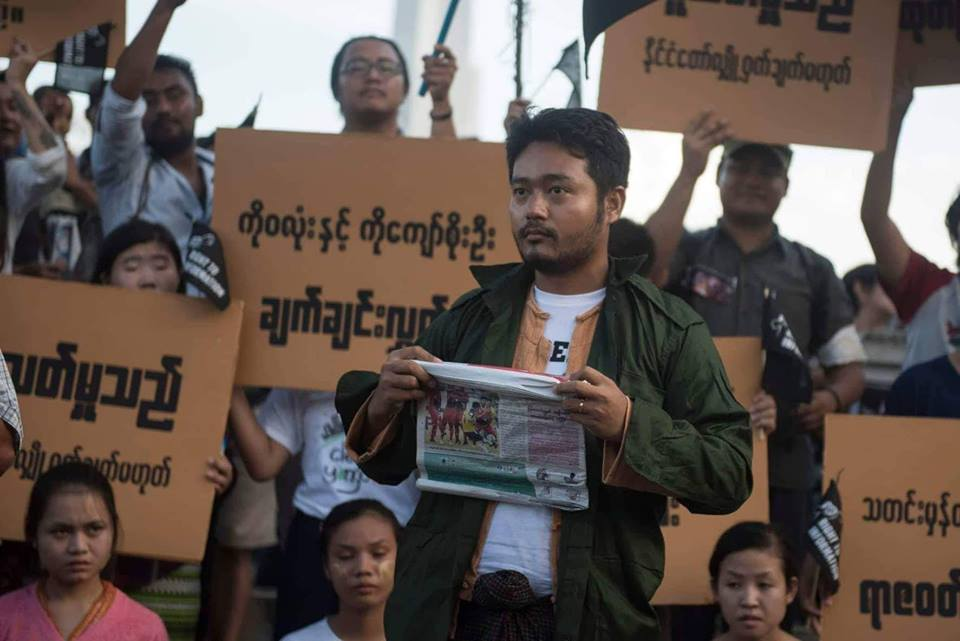
Maung Saunghkha in 2018

In 2012, Maung Saungkha joined the National League for Democracy as a youth working group representative.

On 15 January 2018 Maung Saungkha founded Athan ('voice'), an activist organisation to "promote freedom of expression and freedom of the press in Myanmar." In December 2018, this organisation received an award from the Embassy of the Kingdom of the Netherlands for their contribution to "the promotion of freedom of expression in Myanmar." He also resigned from the National League for Democracy citing disagreement with Aung San Suu Kyi about the government's actions on protecting the freedom of press and treatment of minorities.

After the 2021 coup d'état, he became a leader of the nationwide protests.

=== Bamar People's Liberation Army ===
On 17 April 2021, he co-founded the Bamar People's Liberation Army, an ethnic armed organisation that strives for ethnic federalism in Myanmar, in which he serves as a commander.

== Political views and opinions ==
Sungkha has expressed support for federalism in Myanmar. He has also spoken against the Rohingya genocide.
