= Sinbaungwe Township =

Sinbaungwe Township ဆင်ပေါင်ဝဲမြို့နယ် Sinbaungwé Township, Tantabin Township
- Township
- Location (red) in Aunglan district
- Coordinates: 19°33′N 95°23′E
- Country: Myanmar
- Region: Magway Region
- District: Aunglan District
- Capital: Sinbaungwe (Tantabin)
- Time zone: UTC+6.30 (MMT)

Sinbaungwe Township (Burmese: ဆင်ပေါင်ဝဲမြို့နယ်) or Tantabin Township is a township of Aunglan District in southeastern Magway Region of Myanmar. It is located to the west of the Pegu Range in the foothills and on the plain of the Irrawaddy. Most of the township is east of the Irrawaddy, but about 20% of the township lies on the right (west) bank. The major town and administrative center is Sinbaungwe (also called Tantabin).

== History ==
Sinbaungwe Township was formerly called Myedé Kyan (remnant of Myedé) as it had been part of Myedé Township (now Aunglan Township) before that was divided. In 2008, a local student named Htoo Zaw Naing became the first student in the township's history to garner 5 distinctions on the National Matriculation Examination.

== Bounds ==
Sinbaungwe Township is bordered by the following townships:

- Magway to the north,
- Taungdwingyi to the north and northeast,
- Lewe of Mandalay Region to the east
- Aunglan (Myayde) to the south,
- Thayet to the southwest, and
- Minhla to the west and northwest.

== Villages ==
Among the many villages and wards (village census tracts) in Sinbaungwe Township are Baingyagon, Bwetsan, Chaungkauk, Egayit, Ingya, Inyon, Konbo, Kyauk-o, Kyigon, Thazi, Wundet, Yebok and Zaunggyandaung.

== Economy ==
Rice growing is the main economic activity in the township.
