= Maw Luu =

Maw Luu မော်လူး
- Town
- Location of Maw Luu, Myanmar
- Coordinates: 24.469°N 96.183°E
- Country: Myanmar
- Region: Sagaing Region
- District: Katha
- Township: Indaw

Population (2019)
  - Total: 8,262
- Time zone: UTC+6.30 (MMT)

Maw Luu (Burmese: မော်လူး) is a town in northern Indaw Township, Katha District, Sagaing Region located on the border with Kachin State in northern Myanmar. The town is located on the Shwebo-Myitkyina Road and has a major railway station. The town was elevated from a village tract in 2018 becoming the second town within Indaw Township. Its location connecting Kachin State with Sagaing makes the town a major transportation hub.

== History ==
During the 2021 civil war, the town was captured in December 2023 by a joint force of Kachin Independence Army and All Burma Students' Democratic Front forces during Operation 1027, blocking key State Administration Council (SAC) troop transportation into Kachin State. Although most residents fled the town, the joint forces and local People's Defence Force members began implementing a "People's Administration" in mid-December, dividing the town into six new wards run by two people each. SAC continued deploying the Myanmar Air Force to attack and bomb the town after the capture, keeping civilians from returning to the town.

On 22 February 2024, SAC forces launched an offensive to recapture the town.
