= Kamma Township =

Kamma Township (ကံမမြို့နယ်)
- Township
- Location in Thayet district

- Location in Myanmar
- Coordinates: 19.02°N 95.10°E
- Country: Myanmar
- Region: Magway
- District: Thayet
- Capital: Myanmar

Population (2014)
  - Total: 75,195
- Time zone: UTC+6.30 (MMT)

Kamma Township is a township in Thayet District of Magway Region, Myanmar. The administrative seat of the township is Kamma. As of 2014, there are 75,195 residents in the township.

== Economy ==
Agriculture in legume, peanuts, rice and sesame are the main economic activities in the township.
