= Minbu District =

District in Magway Region, Myanmar

Minbu District မင်းဘူးရိုင်
- Minbu District (Red) in Magway Region
- Coordinates: 20°15′N 94°15′E
- Country: Myanmar
- Region: Magway Region
- Capital: Minbu
- Time zone: MMT

Minbu District is a district in western Magway Region in central Myanmar. The city of Minbu is the administrative centre. Minbu District has 5 townships.

== List of city and towns by urban population ==
Rank	City/Town	Township	2014 Census (2019 Estimate)	1993 Estimate	Change
1	Minbu	Minbu Township	39,884	42,809	−6.83%
2	Salin	Salin Township	20,401	12,158	+67.80%
3	Sagu	Minbu Township	14,366	13,522	+6.24%
4	Pwintbyu	Pwintbyu Township	6,476	5,350	+21.05%
5	Sinhpyukyun	Salin Township	6,756	0	NA
6	Sidoktaya	Sidoktaya Township	4,971	6,514	−23.69%
7	Ngape	Ngape Township	4,138	6,514	−36.48%

== Borders ==
Minbu District is bounded to the south by Thayet District, to the east by Magway District, to the north by Pakokku District, to the northwest by Mindat District of Chin State, and to the west by Sittwe District of Rakhine State and Kyaukpyu District of Rakhine State.

== Townships ==
The district contains the following townships:

- Minbu Township
- Pwintbyu Township
- Ngape Township
- Salin Township
- Sidoktaya Township
