= Magway, Myanmar =

Magway မကွေး Magwe
- Capital Town
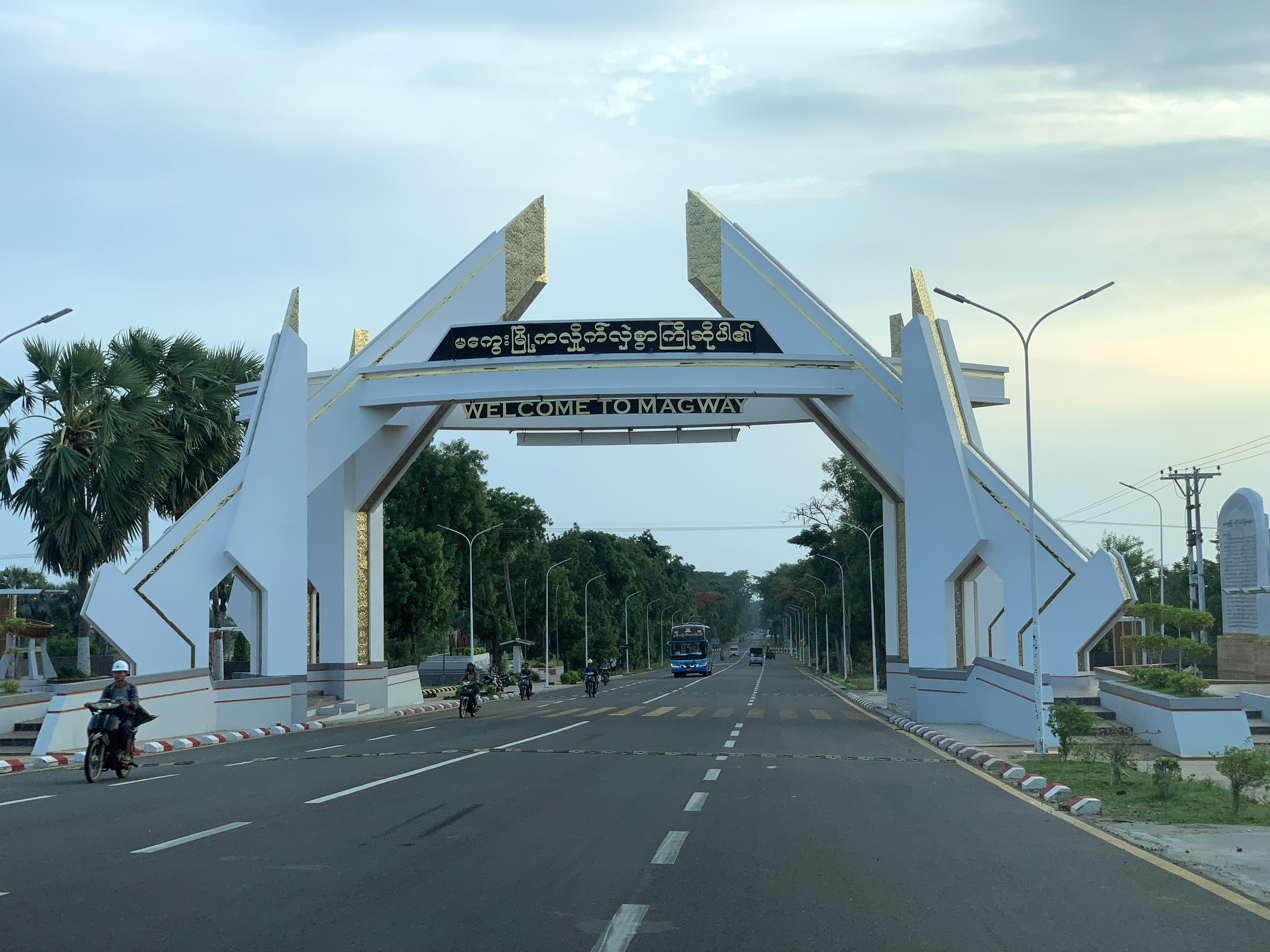

- Location in Myanmar
- Coordinates: 20°09′N 94°57′E
- Country: Myanmar
- Region: Magway Region
- Districts: Magway District
- Township: Magway Township

Government
  - Mayor: U Kyi Tun (USDP)

Population (2014)
  - Capital Town: 289,247
  - Urban: 66,772
  - Metro: 222,475
- Time zone: UTC+6.30 (MST)

Magway or Magwe (Burmese: မကွေးမြို့, MLCTS: ma. kwe: mrui., pronounced [məɡwé mjo̰]) is the capital city of Magway Region (formerly Magway Division) of Myanmar, and situated on the banks of the Irrawaddy River. The Myathalun Pagoda is located in the northern part of the city. Magway Region is famous for the cultivation of sesame and many kinds of nuts. It is the second largest city of Magway Region and it is home to Magway Airport.

== History ==
During the British occupation, Magway was a township of Minbu Division (or) Minbu province. Minbu Region was established with 3 districts: Minbu District, Thayet District and Yenangyaung District. Magway was a township of Yenangyaung District until 1974.

On 2 March 1962, the military led by General Ne Win took control of Burma through a coup d'état, and the government has been under direct or indirect control by the military. A new constitution of the Socialist Republic of the Union of Burma was adopted in 1974.

By 1974, the name of Minbu region was changed to Magway Region and Yenangyaung District was abolished. Magway District was established with 6 townships. The Capital city was changed to Magway from Yenangyaung. In 1974, the urban population of Magway was 7,896.

== Notable Places ==
- Mya Tha Lun Pagoda
- Ayerwady River Bridge
- Kantkaw 1000 Pagoda
- Kantharyar

== Climate ==
Magway has a tropical wet and dry climate (Aw) bordering on a hot semi-arid climate (BSh) under the Köppen climate classification.

Climate data for Magway (1991–2020)
Month	Jan	Feb	Mar	Apr	May	Jun	Jul	Aug	Sep	Oct	Nov	Dec	Year
Record high °C (°F)	36.4 (97.5)	39.8 (103.6)	43.4 (110.1)	46.5 (115.7)	45.4 (113.7)	42.5 (108.5)	40.0 (104.0)	38.4 (101.1)	38.5 (101.3)	38.0 (100.4)	37.5 (99.5)	36.4 (97.5)	46.5 (115.7)
Mean daily maximum °C (°F)	30.6 (87.1)	34.7 (94.5)	38.8 (101.8)	40.9 (105.6)	38.4 (101.1)	34.3 (93.7)	33.3 (91.9)	33.2 (91.8)	33.7 (92.7)	33.4 (92.1)	32.0 (89.6)	29.9 (85.8)	34.4 (93.9)
Daily mean °C (°F)	21.3 (70.3)	24.3 (75.7)	28.6 (83.5)	31.8 (89.2)	31.2 (88.2)	28.9 (84.0)	28.2 (82.8)	28.2 (82.8)	28.3 (82.9)	27.8 (82.0)	25.3 (77.5)	22.1 (71.8)	27.2 (81.0)
Mean daily minimum °C (°F)	12.0 (53.6)	14.0 (57.2)	18.4 (65.1)	22.6 (72.7)	24.0 (75.2)	23.4 (74.1)	23.2 (73.8)	23.2 (73.8)	22.9 (73.2)	22.1 (71.8)	18.7 (65.7)	14.3 (57.7)	19.9 (67.8)
Record low °C (°F)	8.9 (48.0)	9.8 (49.6)	11.0 (51.8)	14.5 (58.1)	18.8 (65.8)	19.0 (66.2)	19.0 (66.2)	19.0 (66.2)	19.5 (67.1)	16.5 (61.7)	10.2 (50.4)	10.5 (50.9)	8.9 (48.0)
Average precipitation mm (inches)	6.9 (0.27)	1.5 (0.06)	4.8 (0.19)	19.4 (0.76)	104.8 (4.13)	155.7 (6.13)	126.0 (4.96)	149.7 (5.89)	171.0 (6.73)	145.3 (5.72)	31.6 (1.24)	7.1 (0.28)	923.8 (36.37)
Average precipitation days (≥ 1.0 mm)	0.6	0.2	0.5	1.6	7.7	13.5	13.6	14.2	12.7	9.6	2.7	1.1	77.9
Source 1: World Meteorological Organization
Source 2: Ogimet.com (extremes)

== Education ==
=== List of universities and colleges in Magway ===
- Magway Education Degree College
- Magway University
- Computer University, Magway
- University of Medicine, Magway
- University of Community Health, Magway
- Technological University, Magway
- University of Computer Studies, Magway

== Sports ==
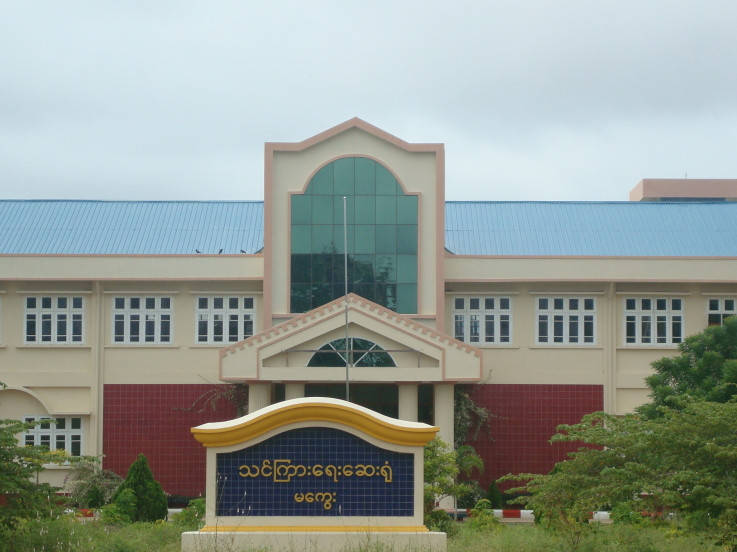
Teaching Hospital of the University of Medicine (Magway)

The 3,000-seat Magway Stadium is a multi-use stadium and used mostly for football matches. The stadium is the home ground of Magway F.C, a Myanmar National League (MNL) football club. But, Magway FC was abolished in 2020, October.

== Health care ==
=== Public Hospitals ===
- Magway Regional Hospital
- University Teaching Hospital of the University of Medicine (Magway)
- Magway Traditional Medicine Hospital

== Future Plans ==
- Magwe Inland port development project in Irrawaddy River
- A new Cinema
- Upgrading Magwe Airport
- Kantha Lake upgrading
