= Mindon Township =

Mindon Township မင်းတုန်းမြို့နယ်
- Township
- Location in Thayet district

- Location in Myanmar
- Coordinates: 19°21′N 94°44′E
- Country: Burma
- Region: Magway
- District: Thayet
- Capital: Mindon
- Time zone: UTC+6.30 (MMT)

Mindon Township (Burmese: မင်းတုန်းမြို့နယ်) is a township of Thayet District in the Magway Region of Myanmar. Its administrative seat is Mindon.
