= Ngape Township =

Ngape Township ငဖဲ မြို့နယ်
- Township
- Location in Minbu district

- Location within Myanmar
- Coordinates: 20°04′31″N 94°28′04″E
- Country: Myanmar
- Division: Magway Region
- District: Minbu District

Population (2014)
  - Township: 52,616
  - Urban: 4,065
- Time zone: UTC+6:30 (MST)

Ngape Township (Burmese: ငဖဲ မြို့နယ်) is a township of Minbu District in the Magway Division of Myanmar. The principal town is Ngape.
