= Magway Region =

Region of Myanmar

Magway Region မကွေးတိုင်းဒေသကြီး
- Region

Myanma transcription(s)
  - Burmese: ma. kwe: tuing: desa. kri:
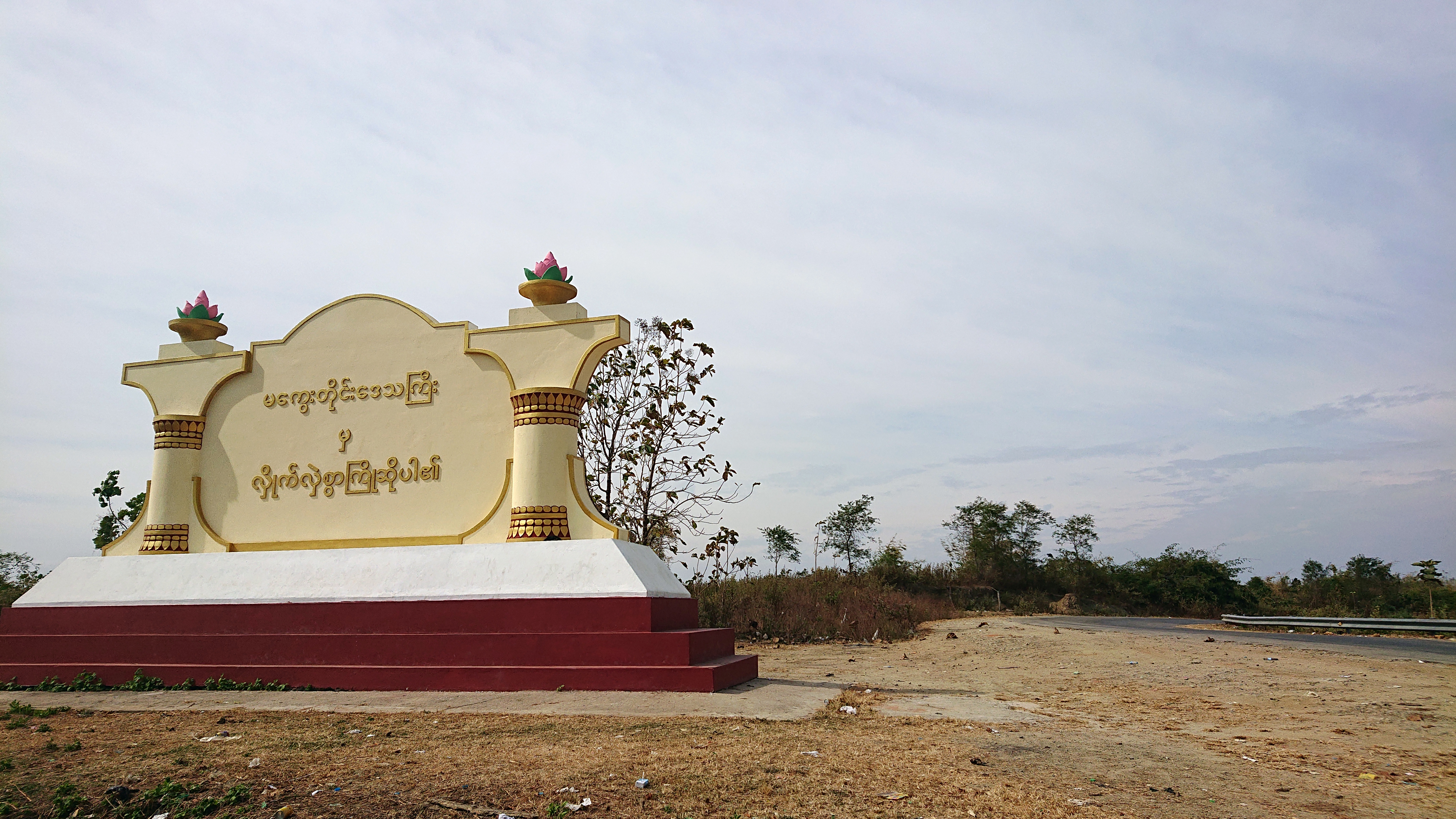
- Border of Magway Region and Naypyidaw Union Territory

- Flag Seal

- Location of Magway Region in Myanmar
- Coordinates: 20°15′N 94°45′E
- Country: Myanmar
- Region: Upper
- Capital: Magway
- Largest city: Pakokku

Government
  - Chief Minister: Tint Lwin
  - Cabinet: Magway Region Government
  - Legislature: Magway Region Hluttaw
  - Judiciary: Magway Region High Court

Area
  - Total: 44,820.6 km^{2} (17,305.3 sq mi)
  - Rank: 4th
- Highest elevation (Kennedy Peak): 2,703 m (8,868 ft)

Population (2014)
  - Total: 3,917,055
  - Rank: 7th
  - Density: 87.3941/km^{2} (226.350/sq mi)
- Demonym: Magwegian

Demographics
  - Ethnicities: Bamar, Chin, Rakhine, Shan, Karen
  - Religions: Buddhism 98.8% Christianity 0.7% Islam 0.3% Hinduism 0.1% animism 0.1%
- Time zone: UTC+06:30 (MST)
- HDI (2017): 0.560 medium · 6th

Magway Region (Burmese: မကွေးတိုင်းဒေသကြီး, pronounced [məɡwé táiɰ̃ dèθa̰ dʑí]; formerly Magway Division) is a first-level administrative division in central Myanmar. It is the second largest of Myanmar's seven regions, with an area of 44,820 km^{2} (17,306 square miles). Pa-de Dam (ပဒဲဆည်) is one of the dams in Aunglan Township, Magway Region. The capital city and second largest city of the Magway Region is Magway. The largest city is Pakokku. The major cities of Magway Region are Magway, Pakokku, Aunglan, Yenangyaung, Taungdwingyi, Chauk, Minbu, Thayet and Gangaw.

== Geography ==
Magway Region sits approximately between north latitude 18° 50' to 22° 47' and east longitude 93° 47' to 95° 55'. It is bordered by Sagaing Region to the north, Mandalay Region to the east, Bago Region to the south, and Rakhine State and Chin State to the west.

== History ==
Fossils of the early primates over 40 million years old were excavated in the Pondaung and Ponnya areas from Pakokku District in Magway Region, leading the government to proclaim that Myanmar as "the birthplace of humanity in the world," a claim which is unsupported by anthropologists. An ancient city of the Pyu, Peikthano-myo, about 2,000 years old, is located in Taungdwingyi Township, Magway Region.

The history of Magway Region mirrors that of the other regions of central Burma. The ancient name of Magway Region was Minbu Region (or) Minbu Province. Minbu Region was established with 3 districts. They are Minbu District, Thayet District, and Yenangyaung District. Its capital city was Yenangyaung. In 1950, Chauk township was moved to Yenangyaung District from Myingyan District.

On 2 March 1962, the military led by General Ne Win took control of Burma through a coup d'état, and the government has been under direct or indirect control by the military. A new constitution of the Socialist Republic of the Union of Burma was adopted in 1974.

The name of Minbu Region was changed to Magway Region and Yenangyaung District was abolished. Magway District was established with 6 townships. Pakokku Hill Tracts (or) Pakokku Province was abolished, and Pakokku District was added to the Magway Division and Mindat District was added to the Chin state. Magway Region was then divided into 4 districts: Magway District, Minbu District, Thayet District and Pakokku District. Its capital city was changed from Yenangyaung to Magway.

On 4 April 1996, Pakokku District was divided into two districts: Pakokku District and Gangaw District. Currently, Magway Region has a total of 5 districts and 25 townships.

== Administrative divisions ==
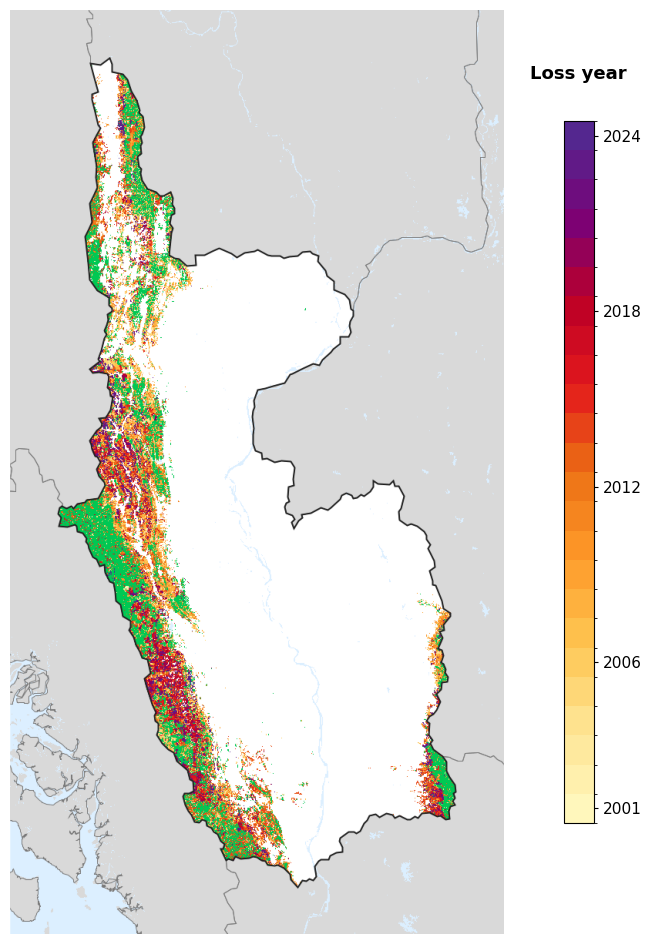
Tree-cover loss year in Magway Region, 2001-2024, from the Global Forest Change dataset.

Magway Region's districts are Magwe, Minbu, Thayet, Pakokku and Gangaw, comprising 25 townships and 1,696 ward village tracts.

=== Major cities and towns (2020) ===
Its capital city is Magwe (2020 urban population estimated as 85,214) and its largest city is Pakokku (2020 urban population estimated as 107,890).

Other major cities are Aunglan (2020 urban population estimated as 52,431), Yenangyaung (2020 urban population estimated as 49,938), Taungdwingyi (2020 urban population estimated as 47,739), Chauk (2020 urban population estimated as 47,568) and Minbu (2020 urban population estimated as 40,304).

Rank	City	District	2014 Census (2020 Estimate)	1993 Estimate	Change
1	Pakokku	Pakokku District	107,890	90,783	+18.84%
2	Magway	Magway District	85,214	72,388	+17.72%
3	Aunglan	Thayet District	52,431	43,223	+21.30%
4	Yenangyaung	Magway District	49,938	90,845	−45.03%
5	Taungdwingyi	Magway District	47,739	52,335	−8.78%
6	Chauk	Magway District	47,568	67,845	−29.89%
7	Minbu	Minbu District	40,304	42,809	−5.85%
8	Yesagyo	Pakokku District	24,428	23,329	+4.71%
9	Salin	Minbu District	20,329	12,158	+67.21%
10	Thayet	Thayet District	20,182	46,361	−56.47%
11	Natmauk	Magway District	14,523	14,737	−1.45%
12	Gangaw	Gangaw District	12,829	13,955	−8.07%
13	Minhla	Thayet District	12,577	12,510	+0.54%
14	Myothit	Magway District	9,197	8,080	+13.82%
15	Seikphyu	Pakokku District	9,165	9,081	+0.93%
16	Myaing	Pakokku District	8,328	7,706	+8.07%
17	Pauk	Pakokku District	8,048	7,286	+10.46%
18	Pwintbyu	Minbu District	6,575	5,350	+22.90%
19	Saw	Gangaw District	5,944	7,078	−16.02%
20	Sidoktaya	Minbu District	5,862	6,514	−10.01%
21	Mindon	Thayet District	5,401	5,098	+5.94%
22	Kamma	Thayet District	5,146	5,202	−1.08%
23	Sinbaungwe	Thayet District	5,025	4,996	+0.58%
24	Htilin	Gangaw District	4,810	4,348	+10.63%
25	Ngape	Minbu District	4,223	6,514	−35.17%

== Government ==
=== Executive ===
The region is administered by the Magway Region Government. The region government is led by the Chief Minister of Magway Region. Until very recently, the Magway Region Government was not in operation and the Magway Region was instead governed by the State Administration Council (SAC), which took power in a coup on 1 February, 2021.

=== Legislature ===
The Magway Region Hluttaw is the legislature of Magway Region, responsible for local governance, passing regional laws, approving localized budgets, and overseeing the region cabinet. It is a unicameral legislature with 68 seats.

=== Judiciary ===
Magway Region High Court is the region's highest-level court.

== Demographics ==
Historical population
Year	Pop.	±%
1973	2,634,757	—
1983	3,243,166	+23.1%
2014	3,917,055	+20.8%
Source: 2014 Myanmar Census

The population of Magway Region is 3,912,711 in 2014.

=== Ethnic makeup ===
Ethnic composition of Magway Region
Ethnic group	Percentage
Bamar	97.1%
Chin	2.6%
Other	0.3%
Source: 2019 GAD township reports

The Bamar make up the majority of the region's population. The Chin are the region's largest minority. Other minorities include the Rakhine, Karen, Shan, and a tiny Anglo-Burmese population. During colonial times, this part of Burma had a large Anglo-Burmese population, descended from Western oil workers and their Burmese partners.

After the 2014 Census in Myanmar, the Burmese government indefinitely withheld release of detailed ethnicity data, citing concerns around political and social concerns surrounding the issue of ethnicity in Myanmar. In 2022, researchers published an analysis of the General Administration Department's nationwide 2018–2019 township reports to tabulate the ethnic makeup of the region.

=== Religion ===
Religion in Magway Region (2014)
1. Buddhism (98.8%)
2. Christianity (0.70%)
3. Islam (0.30%)
4. Tribal religion (0.10%)
5. Hindu (0.10%)

According to the 2014 Myanmar Census, Buddhists make up 98.8% of Magway Region's population, forming the largest religious community there. Minority religious communities include Christians (0.7%), Muslims (0.3%), Hindus (0.1%), and animists (0.1%) who collectively comprise the remainder of Magway Region's population.

According to the State Sangha Maha Nayaka Committee's 2016 statistics, 31,349 Buddhist monks were registered in Magway Region, comprising 5.9% of Myanmar's total Sangha membership, which includes both novice samanera and fully-ordained bhikkhu. The majority of monks belong to the Thudhamma Nikaya (97%), followed by Shwegyin Nikaya (2.4%), with the remainder of monks belonging to other small monastic orders. 2,473 thilashin were registered in Magway Region, comprising 4.1% of Myanmar's total thilashin community.

== Transport ==
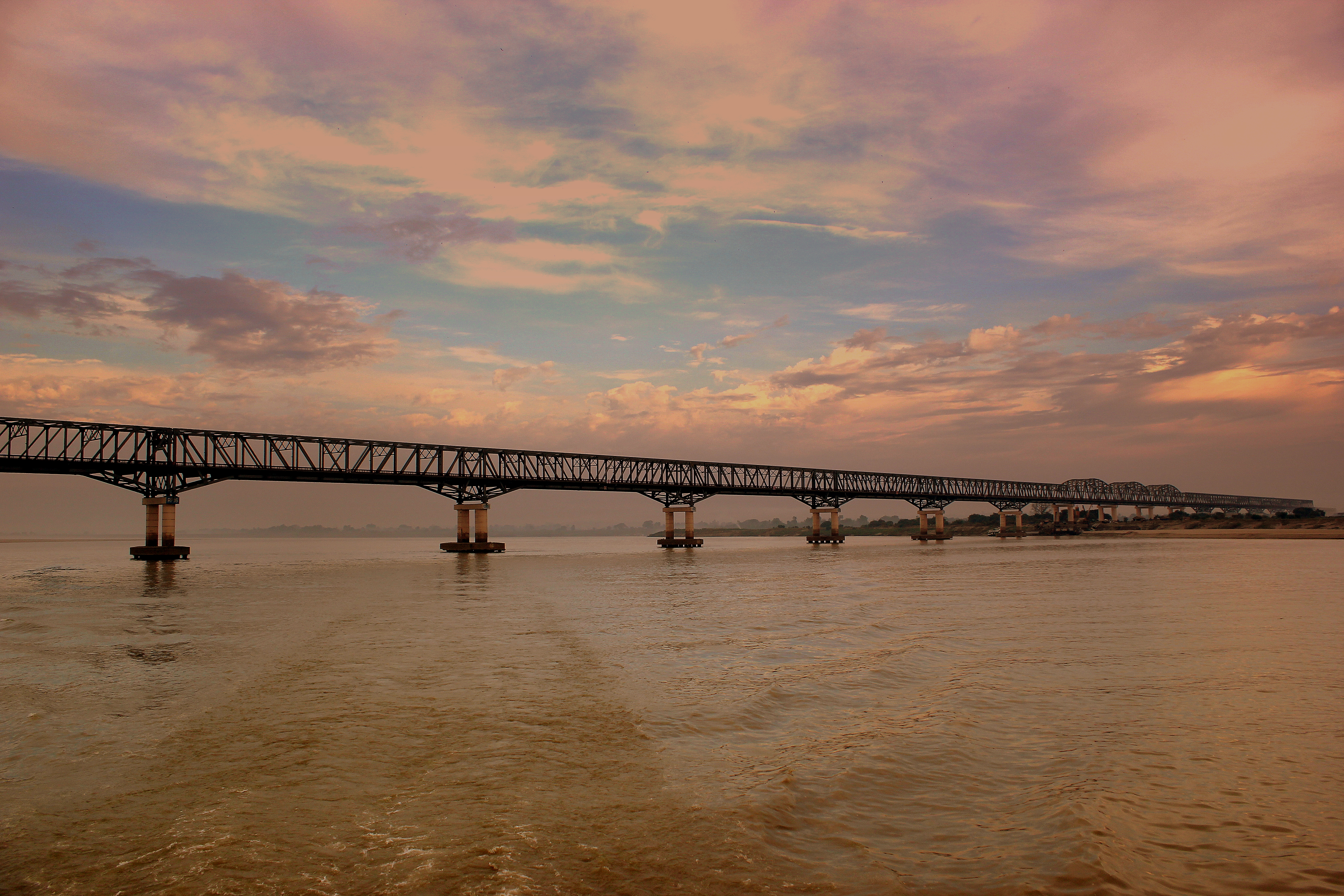

The Irrawaddy River is the major transportation system in Magway Region, both in terms of volume of goods and population served. Most major towns in the region are river ports on the Irrawaddy; among them are Magway, Pakokku, Minbu, Yenangyaung, Chauk, Allanmyo, and Thayetmyo. Pakokku's river port is a major port of Magway Region and the third most important river port in Myanmar after Yangon port and Mandalay port.

The major form of transport for non-Irrawaddy areas is by road. The road system is less developed on the western side of the river. The towns are connected with two-lane roads. Most towns have regular bus transportation to Rangoon (Yangon) and Mandalay. Pakokku Bridge is part of the India–Myanmar–Thailand Trilateral Highway and is the longest bridge in Myanmar.

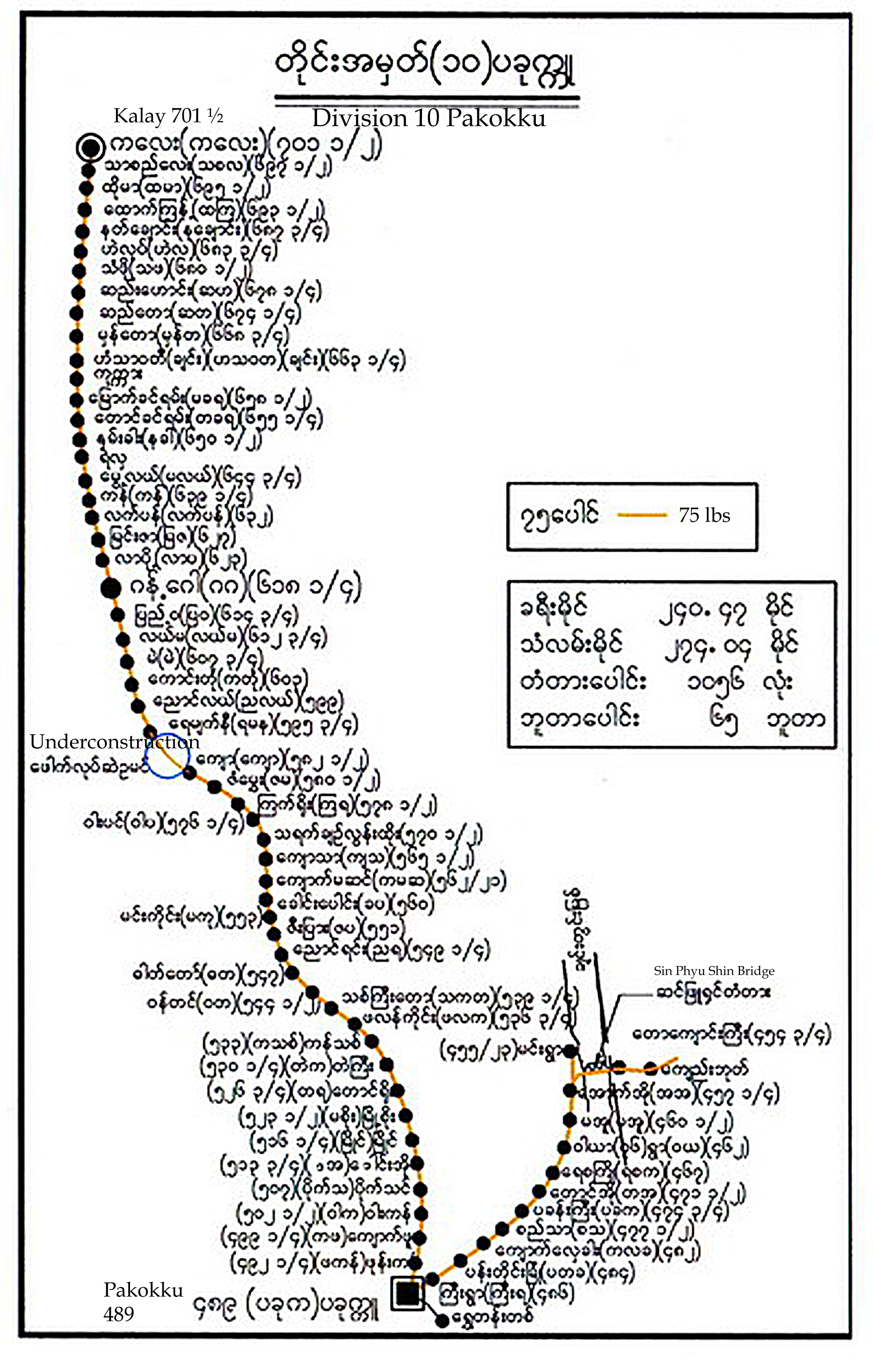
Myanmar Railways station map Division 10 Pakokku

The Pyay to Nyaung-U, Pakokku and Myingyan railway runs through eastern Magway with connections to the capital Naypyidaw, Rangoon and Mandalay. The major stops in Magway on that line are Taungdwingyi and Natmauk. In addition, there are two rail lines running north from the Irrawaddy port of Kyangin, one to Chaung-U in Sagaing Region and the other to the Myittha River valley past Myaing and Kyaw.

The capital Magway has a small non-commercial airport with air traffic for the city of Magway mostly coming in through Bagan Airport at Nyaung U some 113 km to the north along the Irrawaddy. There are commercial airports at Gangaw, Kyauktu, Pakokku, and Pauk. As of 2018, however, none of them have regularly scheduled flights. Pakokku airport, however, plans to upgrade to an international airport soon.

== Economy ==
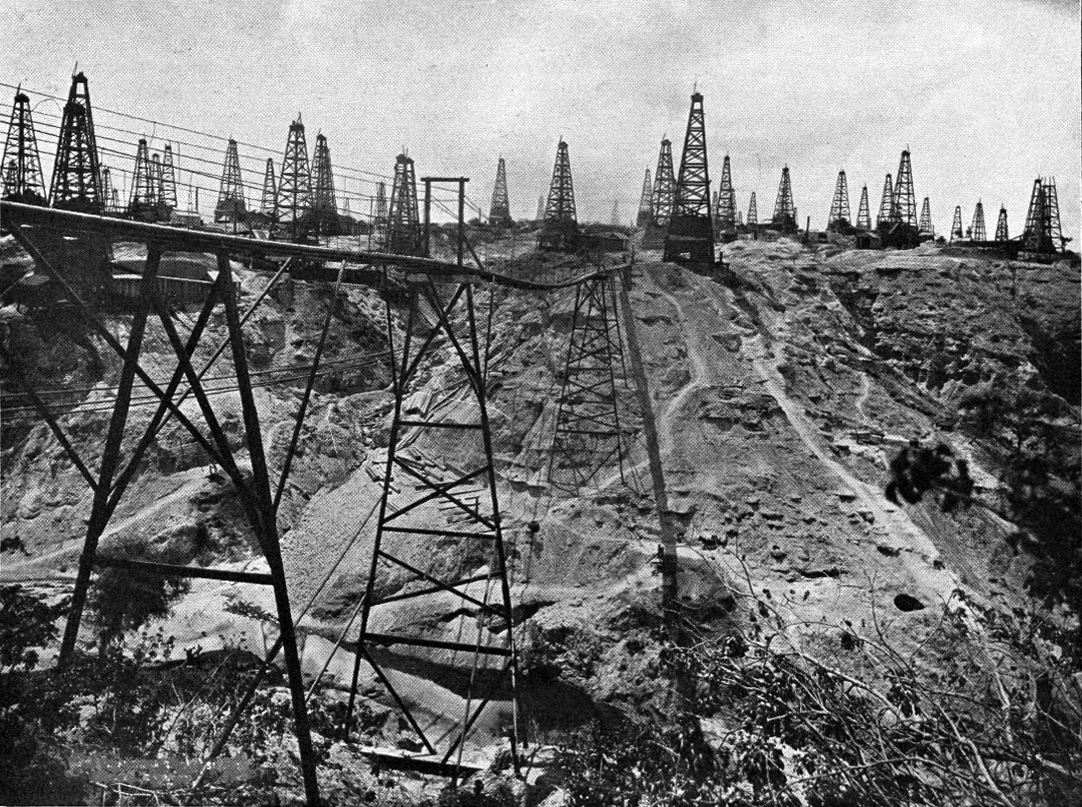
Oil wells in Yenangyaung during the early 20th century

The principal product of Magway Region is petroleum. It produces most of the oil and natural gas in Burma. Magway Region's oil fields are located in Mann, Yenangyaung, Chauk, Kyauk-khwet, Letpando and Ayadaw.

In May 2002, Russia agreed to help Myanmar build a 10-megawatt nuclear reactor and two laboratories in the region. Other industries include cement, cotton weaving, and tobacco, iron and bronze. Magway Region produces a large quantity of edible oil as well as petroleum, hence gaining its reputation as the "oil pot of Myanmar".

Pakokku is the largest rice market city of Upper Myanmar (Burma). Agriculture is another important practice, the major crops being sesamum and groundnut. Other crops grown are rice, millet, maize, sunflower, beans and pulses, tobacco, toddy, chili, onions, and potatoes. Famous products of Magway Region include Thanaka (Limonia acidissima) and Phangar (Chebulic myrobalan) fruit.

Only Pakokku and Yenangyaung have industrial zones.

=== Rice market ===
Pakokku is the biggest rice market in Upper Myanmar due to the rice requirement of the region itself and being a door to Chin State which also needs rice. Of the incoming rice to Pakokku, 70% is from the Ayeyawady Region (Myaungmya, Hinthada and Myanaung) and 30% is from Shwebo and Ye-U of the Sagaing Region. Some 20% of rice coming into the market of Pakokku is consumed by Pakokku itself, and the remaining 80% is sent to other township markets. Most buyers are from Myaing, Yesagyo, Pauk, Myingyan, Kalaymyo and Chin State. In the Pakokku market, consumption is 15% for top class, 50% for middle class and 35% for lower class rice. There are about 5 large rice wholesalers and 10 small rice wholesalers. A large rice wholesaler sells 500 to 1,500 bags per day, so it can sell 180,000 to 200,000 bags (9,000-10,000 tons) a year. Due to the smooth transportation and the booming market, the rice price becomes very high. Thus, the rice market in Pakokku has increased to double that of the Mandalay market.

== Education ==
As of 2002, Magway Region have 3859 schools, of which only 70 are high schools. Only about 10% of the region's primary school students reach high school.

AY 2002–2003	Primary	Middle	High
Schools	3605	184	70
Teachers	14,800	3730	1377
Students	428,000	128,000	44,000

Most of 12 colleges and universities in the region are located in Magway, Pakokku and Yenangyaung.

== Health care ==
The general state of health care in Myanmar is poor. The military government spends anywhere from 0.5% to 3% of the country's GDP on health care, consistently ranking among the lowest in the world. Although health care is nominally free, in reality, patients have to pay for medicine and treatment, even in public clinics and hospitals. Public hospitals lack many of the basic facilities and equipment. Moreover, the health care infrastructure outside of Yangon and Mandalay is extremely poor. As of 2003, Magway Region had less than a quarter of hospital beds than Yangon Region with a slightly greater population.

2002–2003	# Hospitals	# Beds
Specialist hospitals	0	0
General hospitals with specialist services	3	550
General hospitals	25	750
Health clinics	36	576
Total	64	1916

== Notable sites ==
- Fort Min Hla and Fort Kway Chaung: Two late-Konbaung-era forts built to resist a British invasion. The first is situated in the town of Minhla, while the latter is located at opposite bank of the Irrawaddy river.
- Thihoshin Pagoda: Famous Buddhist pagoda in Pakokku, built by King Alaungsithu.
