= Alanzu =

- Town
- Location in Burma
- Coordinates: 18°7′N 95°47′E
- Country: Burma
- Region: Bago Region
- District: Tharrawaddy District
- Township: Okpho Township
- Time zone: UTC+6.30 (MST)

Alanzu is a small town in Okpho Township, Tharrawaddy District, in the Bago Region of southern-central Burma. It is located to the due east of Okpho. National Highway 2 passes to the west of the town. Alanzu is situated close to the localities Teinhmyok and Ywathit.
