= Tharrawaddy =

Tharrawaddy may refer to:

- Tharrawaddy Min (1787–1846), 8th king of the Konbaung Dynasty of Burma, 1837–1846
- Tharrawaddy District, a district of Bago Division, Myanmar
  - Tharrawaddy Township
  - Tharrawaddy, Myanmar, the capital city of Tharrawaddy Township and District
