= Minhla =

Minhla may refer to various places in Burma:

- Minhla, Bago, small town
- Minhla Township, whose seat is Minhla Bago
- Minhla, Magway, town
- Minhla Township, Magway, whose seat is Minhla, Magway
- Minhla, Mon, village 15°25′N 98°0′E
- Minhla, Sagaing, village 21°38′N 95°19′E
