= Okpo =

Okpo may refer to:

- Okpho, town in Myanmar
- Okpho Township, whose seat is Okpho
- Okpo, Madaya, Myanmar
- Okpo, Geoje, South Korea
