= Thonze =

Town in Bago Region, Myanmar

Thonze သုံးဆယ်မြို့
- Town
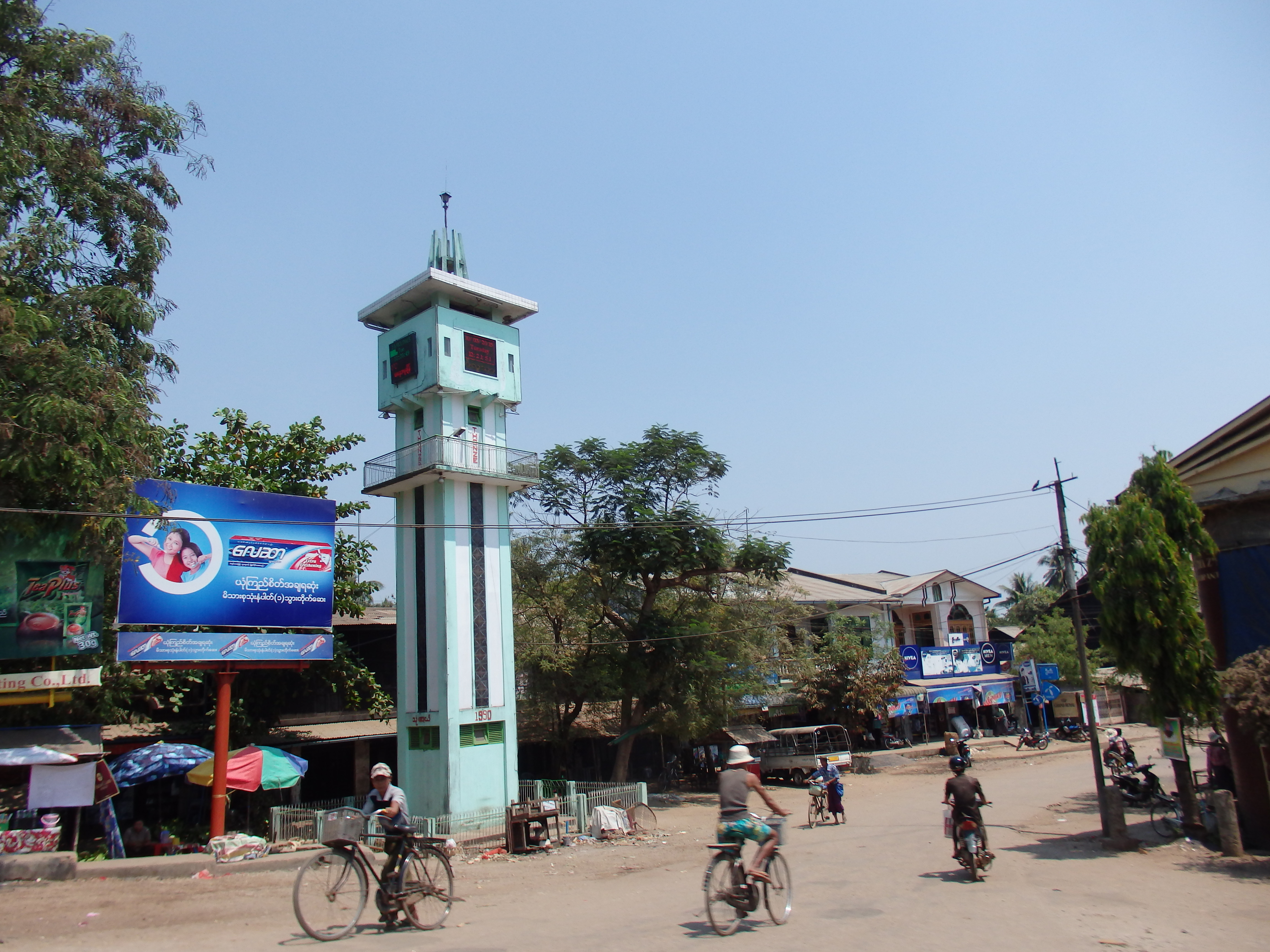
- Thonze Clock Tower

- Location in Myanmar
- Coordinates: 17.627806°N 95.787125°E
- Country: Myanmar
- Region: Bago Region
- District: Tharrawaddy District
- Township: Tharrawaddy Township

Area
  - Total: 3.05 sq mi (7.9 km^{2})

Population
  - Total: 22,482
  - Density: 7,370/sq mi (2,850/km^{2})
- Time zone: UTC+6.30 (MMT)

Thonze (Burmese: သုံးဆယ်, also spelt Thonse) is a town in Tharrawaddy Township in western Bago Region, Myanmar. The town borders the town of Tharrawaddy's south side. It is divided into 13 urban wards and had a population of 22,482 people in 2019.

== History ==
During British colonial rule, Thonze was a logging hub where the taungya variety of teak was first grown in plantation style. In 1883, the Thonze forests were mapped and divided into compartments for the purpose of creating forest resource reserves. The missionary Marilla Baker Ingalls settled in Thonze in 1859, describing it as a remote village, requiring a two-day boat trip from Rangoon up the Hlaing River. She set up a mission and created a community of Baptists through her life in the village. The first rail line to Thonze was built in 1877, and the village grew into a station town.
