= Meiktila =

Meiktila မိတ္ထီလာမြို့
- Town
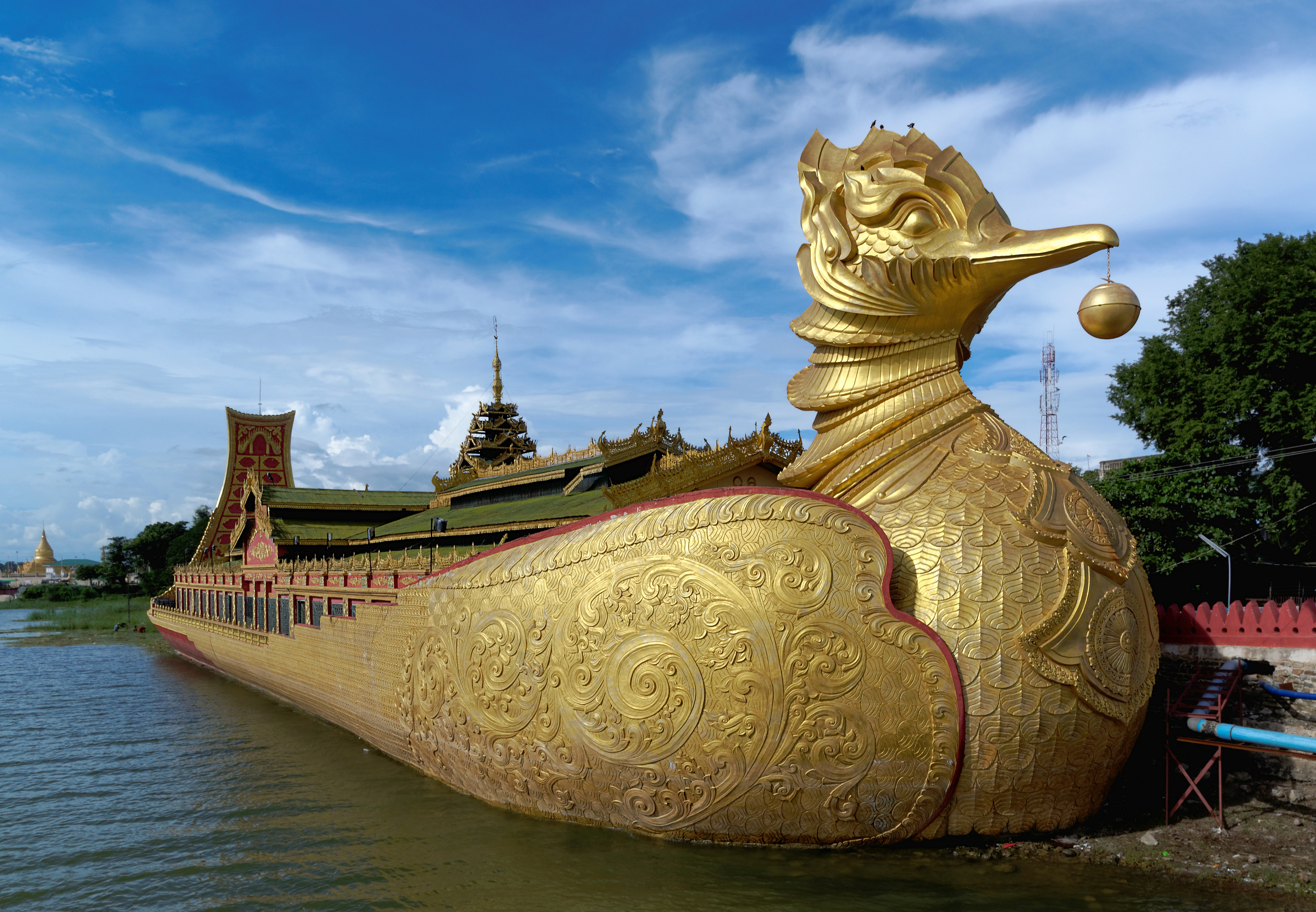

- Location in Burma
- Coordinates: 20°53′0″N 95°53′0″E
- Country: Myanmar
- Division: Mandalay Region
- District: Meiktila District
- Township: Meiktila Township

Population (2021)
  - Total: 177,442
  - Ethnicities: Bamar Karen Shan
  - Religions: Theravada Buddhism
- Time zone: UTC+6.30 (MST)

Meiktila (Burmese: မိတ္ထီလာမြို့, MLCTS: mit thi la mrui.; Burmese pronunciation: [meɪʔtʰìlà mjo̰]) is a city in central Burma on the banks of Meiktila Lake in the Mandalay Region at the junctions of the Bagan-Taunggyi, Yangon-Mandalay and Meiktila-Myingyan highways. Because of its strategic position, Meiktila is home to Myanmar Air Force's central command and Meiktila Air Force Base. The country's main aerospace engineering university, Myanmar Aerospace Engineering University is also located in Meiktila. As of 2021, the city had a population of 177,442.

== History ==
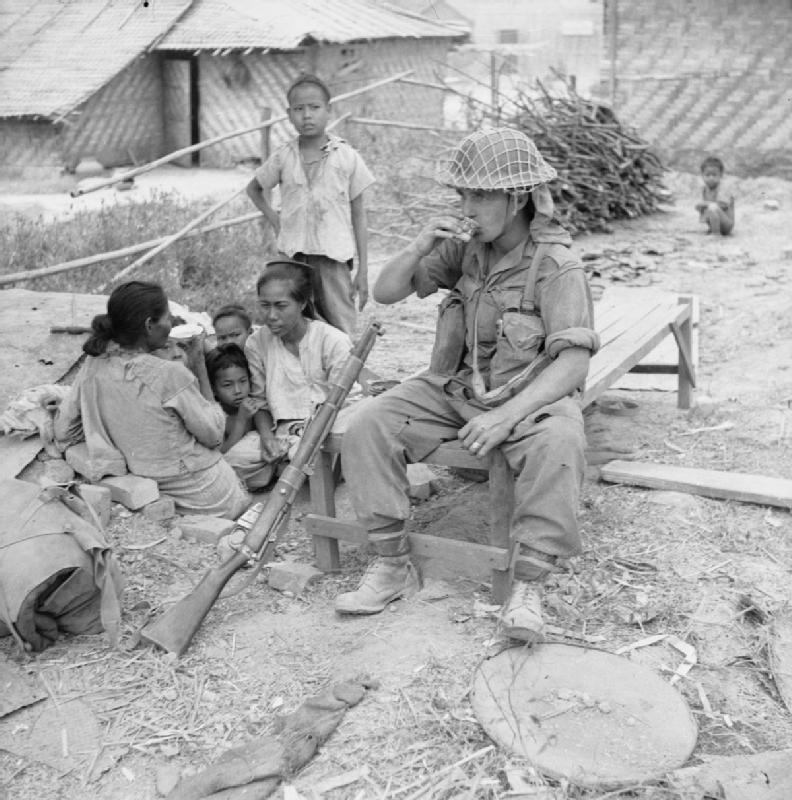
A Burmese family living in a dug-out share tea with a British soldier in Meiktila, 10 March 1945.

The name Meiktila comes from Mithila, the name of an ancient Indian kingdom.

The history of Meiktila is closely tied to that of central Myanmar's Dry Zone, home of the Bamar people. The region had been part of various Bamar kingdoms at least from 11th century CE to 19th century CE before the British Empire took over all of Upper Myanmar in 1885.

Meiktila was part of the 1945 Battle of Meiktila and Mandalay, during which the Allied forces under William Slim defeated the Japanese forces. Soon after Burma's independence from Britain in 1948, Meiktila briefly fell under the insurgent Karen forces.

On 22 March 2013, a state of emergency was imposed in the town after two days of anti-Muslim riots after dozens of people were killed and more than 12,000 were forced from their homes, the overwhelming majority of whom were Muslims. This violence later spread to other places in Burma such as Okpho and Gyobingauk Townships.

== Geography ==
Meiktila district is the most easterly of the districts in Myanmar's central dry zone. It lies between Wundwin, Myingyan, Yamethin, and touches Shan State on the east. The chief feature of the region Lake Meiktila, an artificial irrigation and water reservoir, 7 miles (11 km) long, 0.5 miles (0.80 km) wide. The lake is divided into two parts, north and south, by a bridge on the Meiktila-Kyaukpadaung highway. Mondai dam supplies water to the lake.

== Climate ==
Meiktila has a hot semi-arid climate (Köppen BSh), marginally too dry to qualify as a tropical savanna climate (Aw). Temperatures are hot throughout the year, and the months before the monsoon (March to May) are sweltering, with average maxima around 36 °C (96.8 °F). There is a winter dry season (November–April) and a summer wet season (May–October); however the wet season rainfall is much lower than most of Indochina because of the rain shadow of the Arakan Mountains to the west.

Climate data for Meiktila (1991–2020)
| Month | Jan | Feb | Mar | Apr | May | Jun | Jul | Aug | Sep | Oct | Nov | Dec | Year |
|---|---|---|---|---|---|---|---|---|---|---|---|---|---|
| Record high °C (°F) | 37.0 (98.6) | 39.5 (103.1) | 41.5 (106.7) | 43.0 (109.4) | 44.0 (111.2) | 40.0 (104.0) | 41.2 (106.2) | 37.0 (98.6) | 37.0 (98.6) | 37.0 (98.6) | 36.0 (96.8) | 36.0 (96.8) | 44.0 (111.2) |
| Mean daily maximum °C (°F) | 30.1 (86.2) | 33.5 (92.3) | 36.9 (98.4) | 38.7 (101.7) | 36.3 (97.3) | 33.4 (92.1) | 32.9 (91.2) | 32.4 (90.3) | 32.9 (91.2) | 32.6 (90.7) | 31.2 (88.2) | 29.3 (84.7) | 33.3 (91.9) |
| Daily mean °C (°F) | 22.4 (72.3) | 25.1 (77.2) | 29.0 (84.2) | 31.9 (89.4) | 30.8 (87.4) | 29.1 (84.4) | 28.7 (83.7) | 28.4 (83.1) | 28.6 (83.5) | 28.0 (82.4) | 25.7 (78.3) | 22.7 (72.9) | 27.5 (81.5) |
| Mean daily minimum °C (°F) | 14.6 (58.3) | 16.7 (62.1) | 21.2 (70.2) | 25.1 (77.2) | 25.3 (77.5) | 24.7 (76.5) | 24.5 (76.1) | 24.3 (75.7) | 24.3 (75.7) | 23.5 (74.3) | 20.1 (68.2) | 16.2 (61.2) | 21.7 (71.1) |
| Record low °C (°F) | 9.0 (48.2) | 10.0 (50.0) | 12.0 (53.6) | 18.3 (64.9) | 19.0 (66.2) | 20.0 (68.0) | 19.0 (66.2) | 20.2 (68.4) | 20.0 (68.0) | 16.2 (61.2) | 12.7 (54.9) | 10.0 (50.0) | 9.0 (48.2) |
| Average precipitation mm (inches) | 4.3 (0.17) | 1.3 (0.05) | 5.1 (0.20) | 28.7 (1.13) | 141.0 (5.55) | 110.5 (4.35) | 77.5 (3.05) | 133.5 (5.26) | 165.1 (6.50) | 152.5 (6.00) | 34.4 (1.35) | 8.0 (0.31) | 861.9 (33.93) |
| Average precipitation days (≥ 1.0 mm) | 0.6 | 0.3 | 0.7 | 2.5 | 9.6 | 10.1 | 9.3 | 12.9 | 12.1 | 9.9 | 3.0 | 1.0 | 71.9 |
Source: World Meteorological Organization

== Culture ==
Meiktila has 44 Buddhist pagodas as of 2020. The most well-known pagodas are located on the lakefront, although they exist throughout the town in both upland and lowland areas. Below is a table of 10 of the main pagodas in Meiktila:

| Pagoda name | Location | Type of structure | Date of present structure (if listed) | Donor (if known) |
|---|---|---|---|---|
| Shwe Myin Tin | Yadana Man Aung | Stupa with spire | 1112 | Narapati Sithu |
| Phaung Taw U | Myoma Lay | Stupa only | | |
| Su Taung Pyi | Myoma Lay | Stupa only | 1888 | Narapati Sithu |
| Naga Yone Maha Bodhi | Nantaw Gone | Stupa with temple | | Narapati Sithu |
| Chantha Gyi | Ashae Byin | Stupa only | | Narapati Sithu |
| Aung Theikdi | Near Seven Waterfalls | Stupa only | 2000 | |
| Aunt Ta Ku | Nantaw Gone | Stupa only | | |
| Wun Taw Pyi | Kyitaw Gone | Stupa with temple | 1853 | Naung Taung Mya (early 1200s) |
| Shwe Saw Lu | Nantaw Gone | Stupa with spire | | Saw Lu Min and Narapati Sithu |
| Htee Thone Sint | Wunzin | Stupa with spire | 1201 | Narapati Sithu |

Other, lesser-visited pagodas include ones in the Aung Zaya and Yan Myo Aung quarters.

The city's well-known pagodas are Shwemyintin, Shweyinmi (asa Hteethonesint), Nagayon, Yele, Sutaung Pyi, Hpaung Daw U Pagoda and Phaungdawoo.

== Education ==
Meiktila is home to the Myanmar Aerospace Engineering University, a national university; and regional universities and colleges such as Meiktila University, Meiktila Institute of Economics, Computer University, Meiktila, Technological University, Meiktila and Meiktila Education College.

Of the city's six public Basic Education High Schools, BEHS 1 Meiktila or Royal High School is considered the most selective.

== Military ==
Meiktila is home to two Myanmar Air Force air bases:

- Meiktila Air Base and home to Central Command
- Shante Air Base - located north of Meiktila in Pyitharyar

== Gallery ==
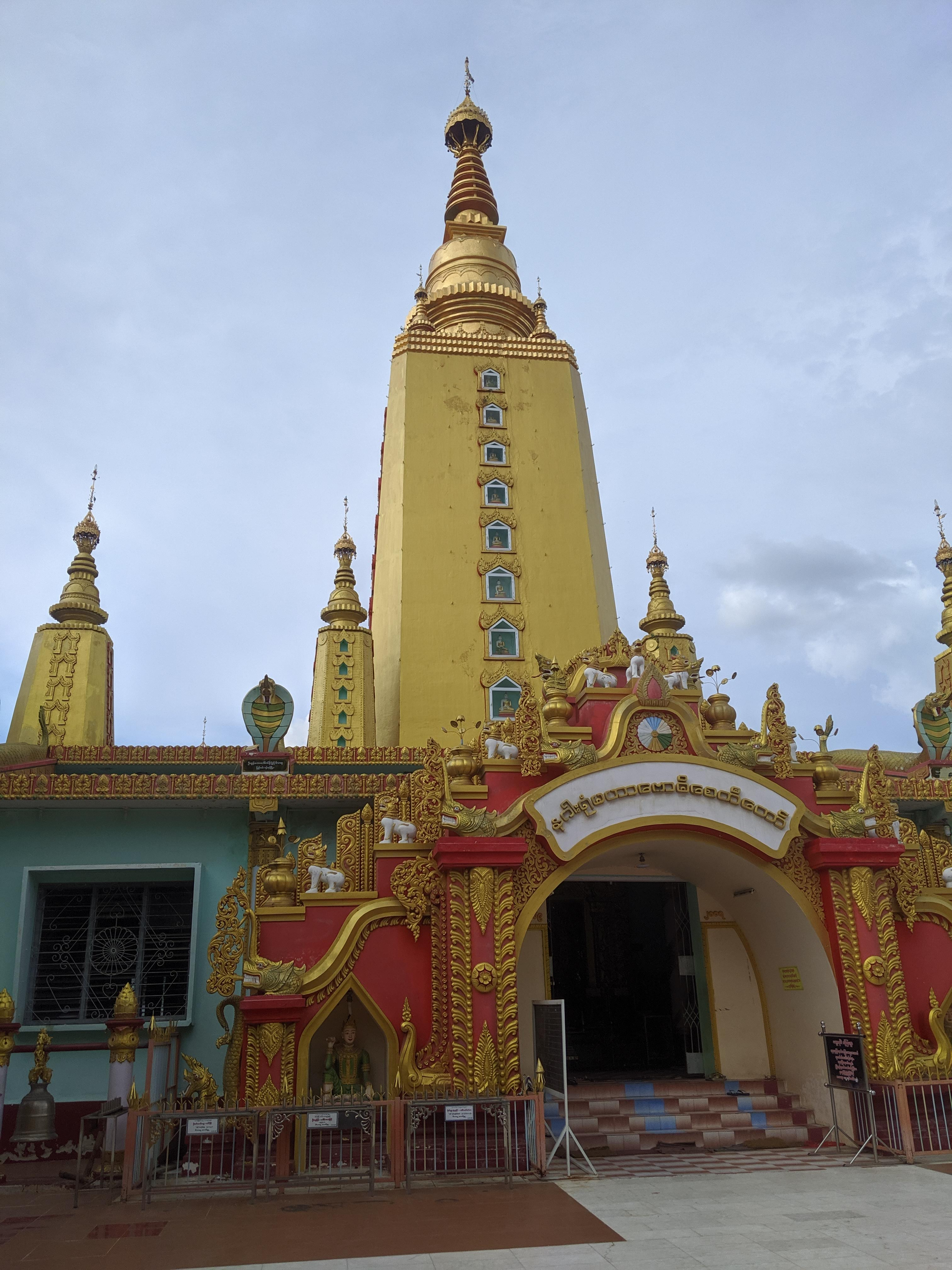
Nagayon pagoda

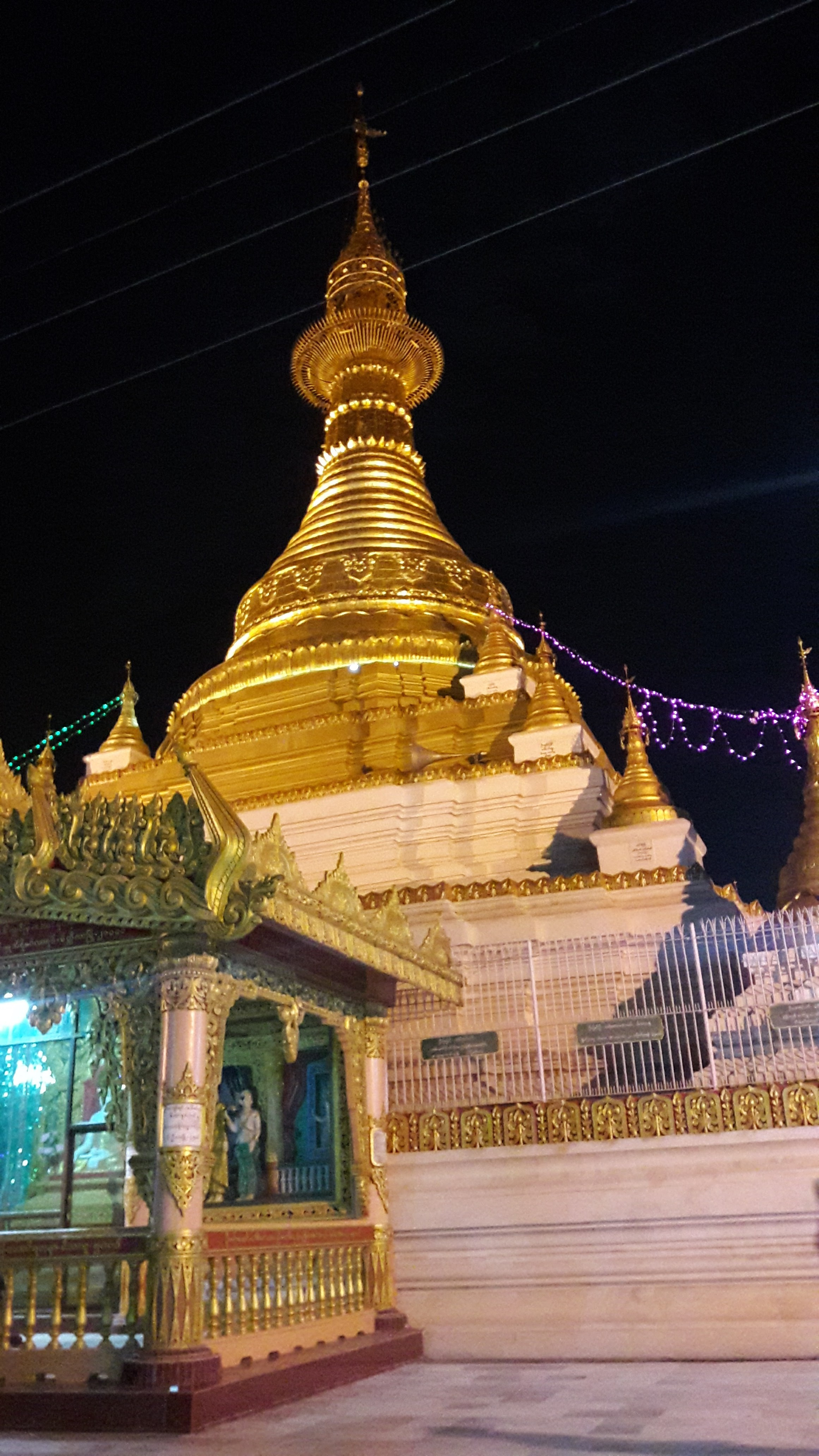
Shwe Myin Tin pagoda

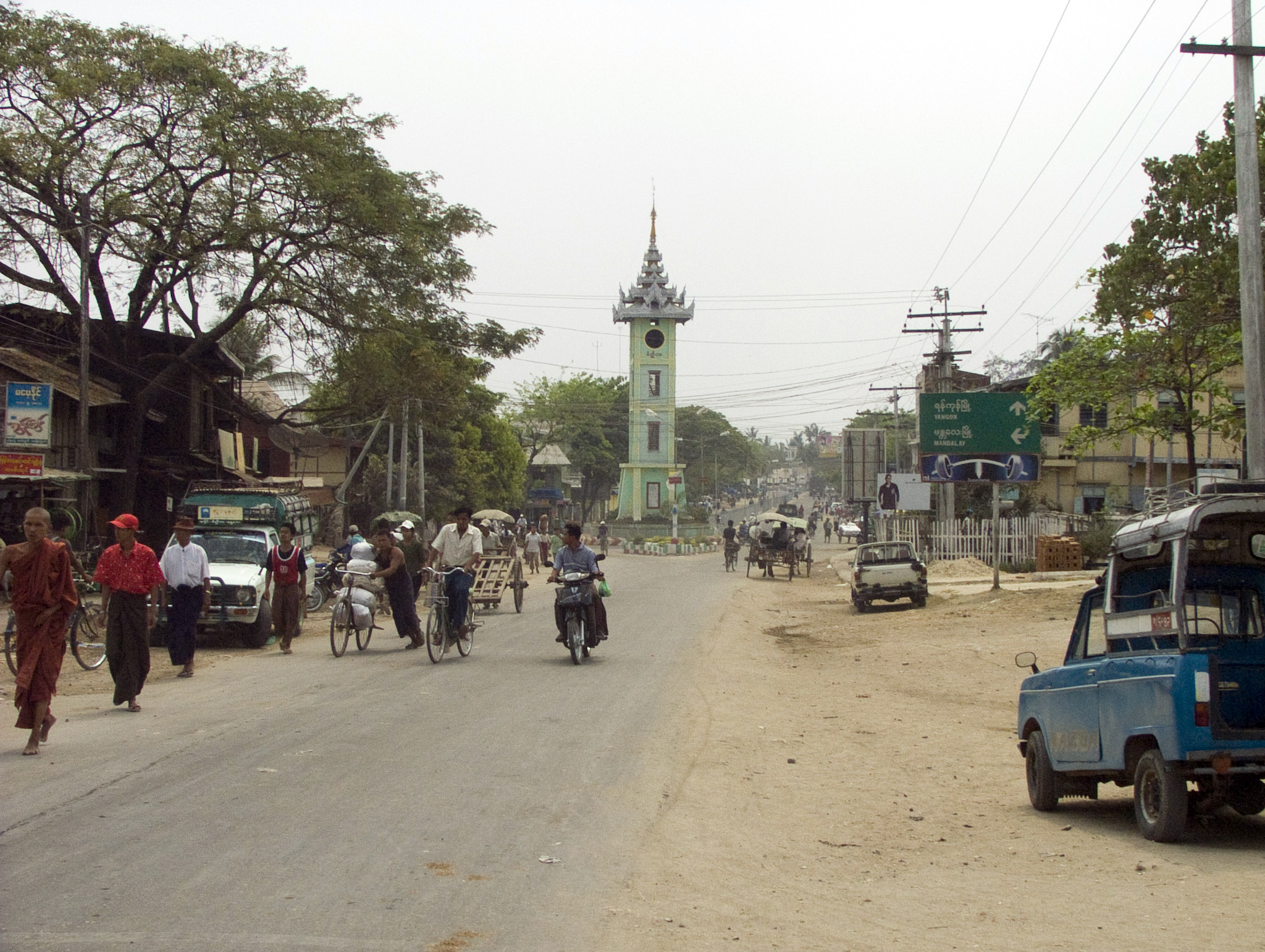
Clock tower in central Meiktila

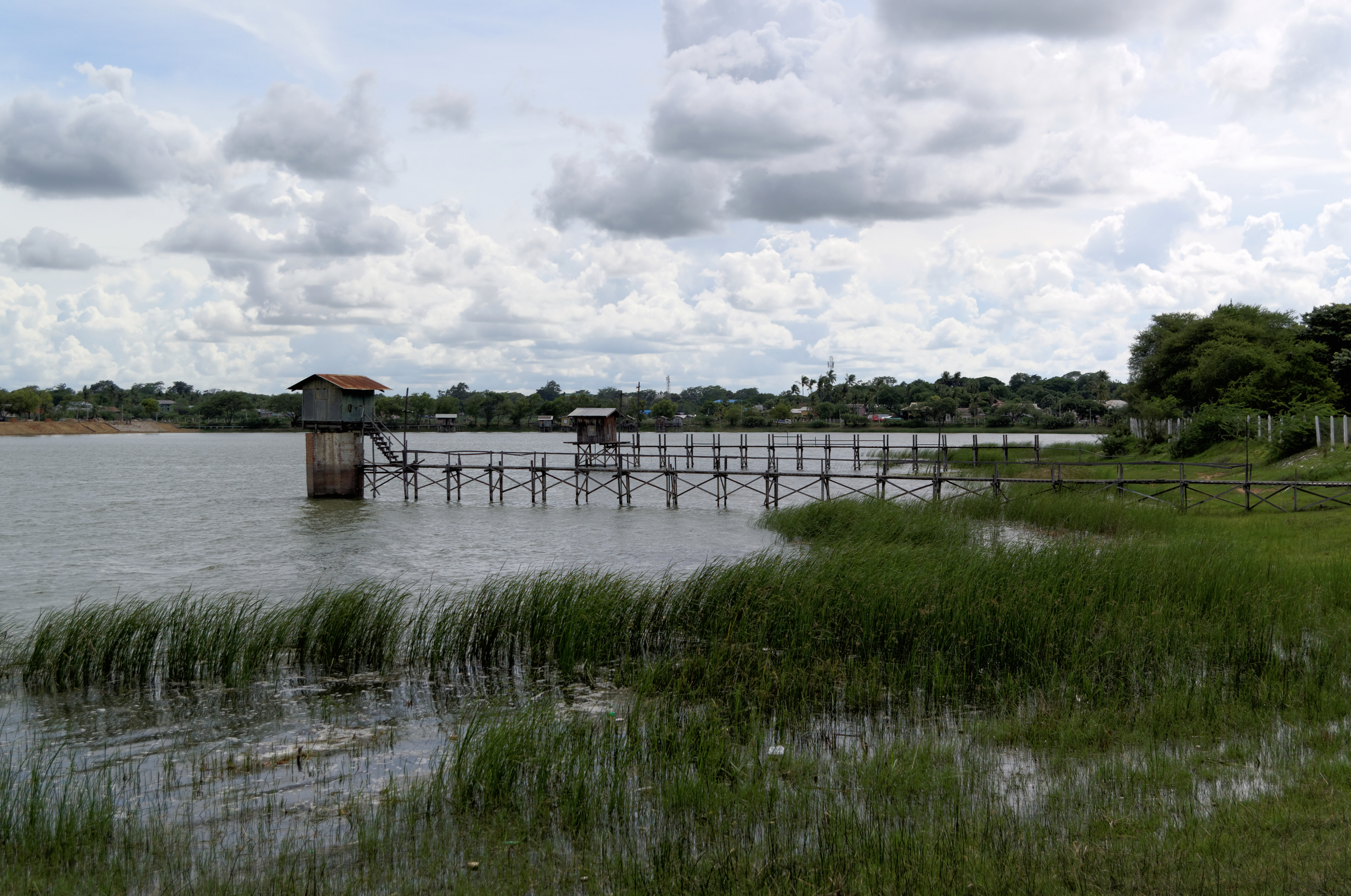
View of Meiktila Lake

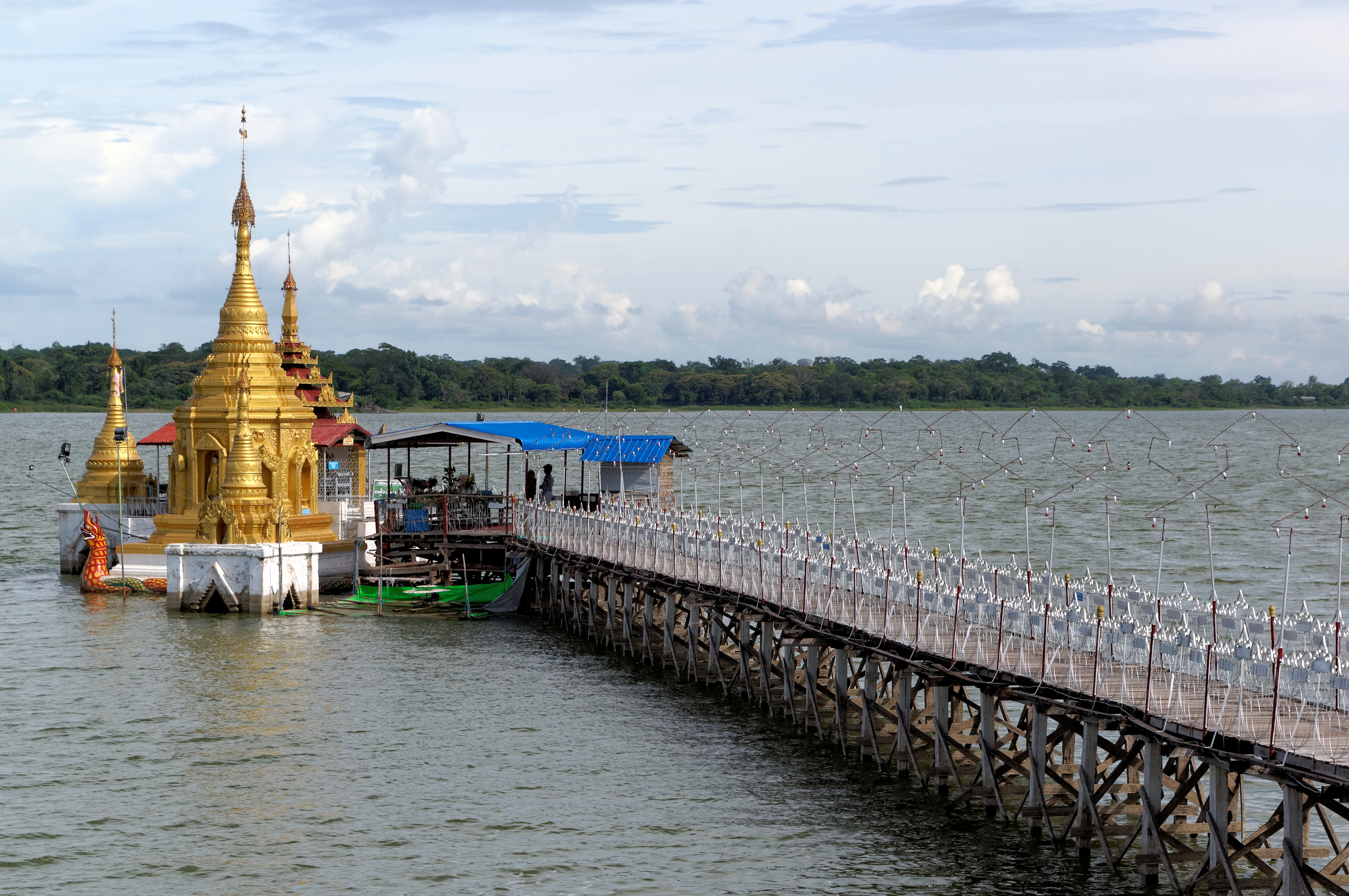
Aunt Ta Ku pagoda, built on a pier in the lake

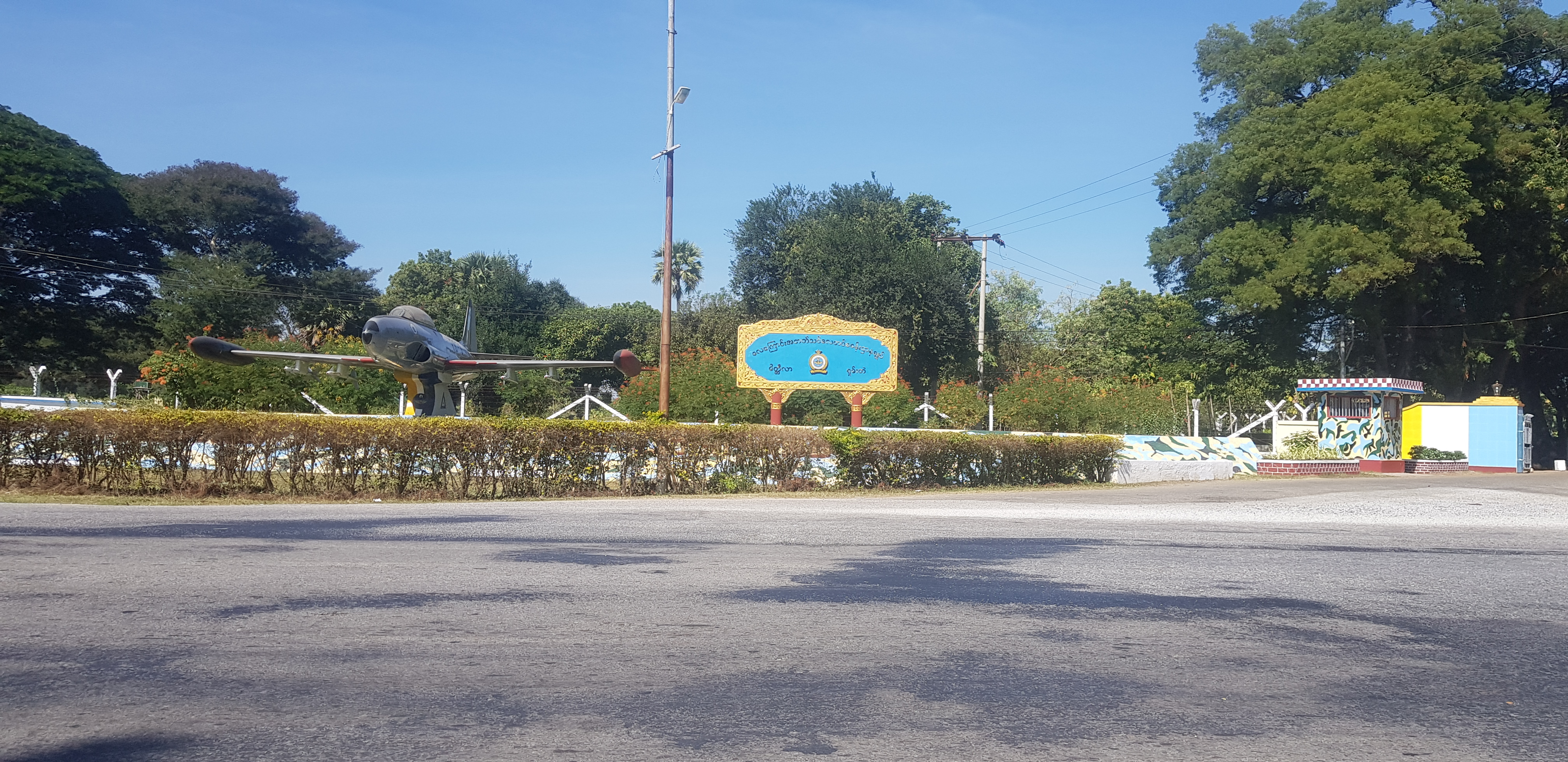
Shante Airbase entrance

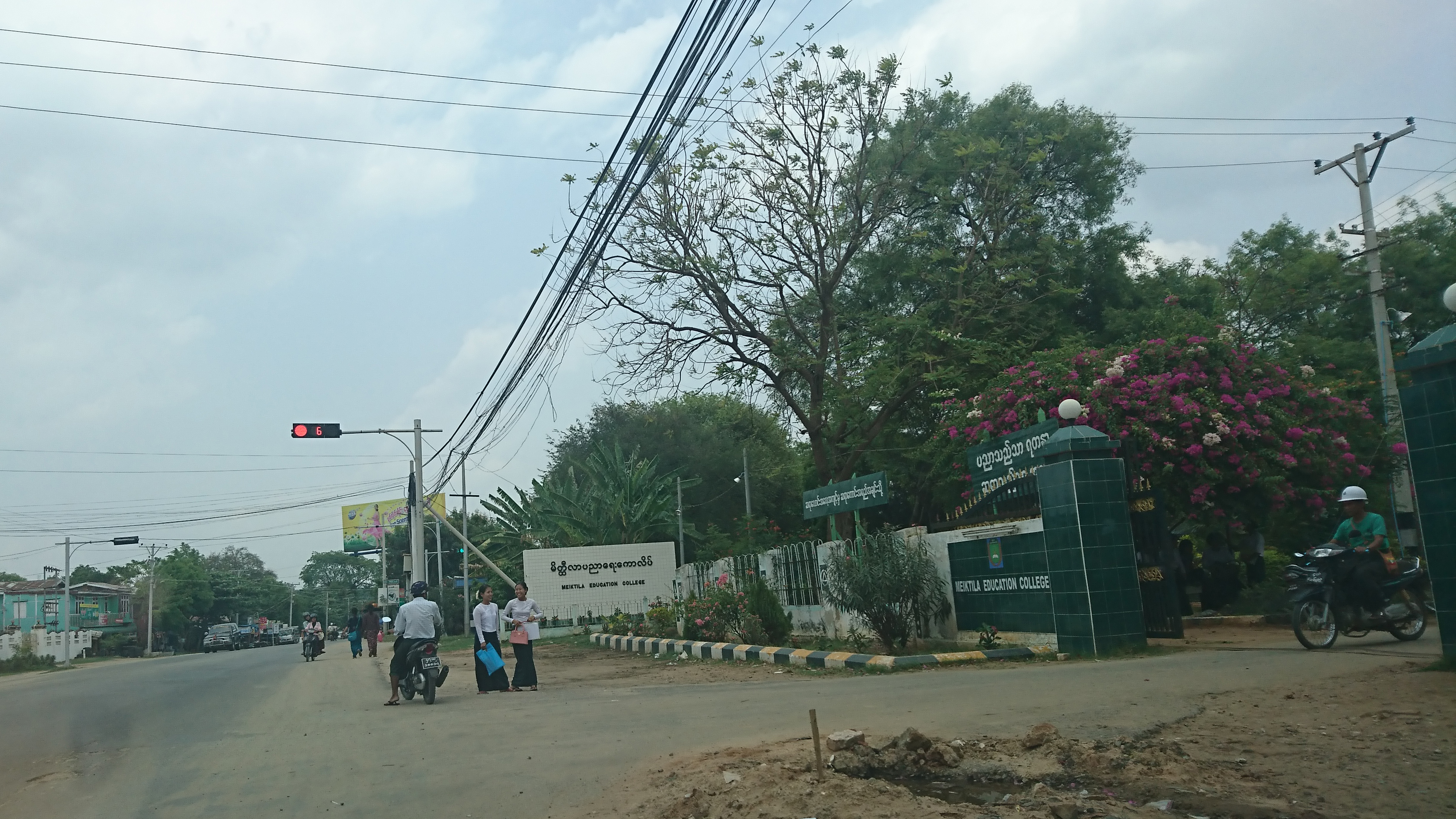
Meiktila Education College entrance
