= Basic Education High School No. 1 Meiktila =

School in Myanmar

Coordinates: 20°53′N 95°53′E

No.1, Basic Education High School, Meiktila အ.ထ.က. (၁) မိတၳီလာ

Location
- Kanpat Street; Meiktila, Mandalay Region; Myanmar

Information
- Type: Public
- Established: 1901
- School number: 1
- Grades: K-10
- Campus: 3.472 acres (14,050 m^{2})
- Website: http://www.royal1meikhtila.edu

Basic Education High School No. 1 Meiktila (Burmese: အေျခခံပညာ အထက္တန္းေက်ာင္း မိတ္ထီလာ; commonly known as Royal No.1 High School), located on the bank of Lake Meiktila, is a public high school in Meiktila, Myanmar.
