= Sitkwin, Minhla Township =

Town in Bago Region, Myanmar

Coordinates: 17°53′38″N 95°43′26″E

Sitkwin (Burmese: စစ် ကွင်း, BGN/PCGN: sitkwin) is a small town in Minhla Township, Bago Region, of Myanmar.

== Important events ==
February 7, 1998: Bertrand Piccard and Crew arrived with their Breitling Orbiter balloon. First, they got greeted by the Burmese army with gunfire to their balloon.
