= Belmond Orcaella =

River cruiser in Myanmar

General information
- Location: Ayeyarwady and Chindwin Rivers, Myanmar
- Operator: Belmond Ltd.

Other information
- Number of rooms: 25

Website
- belmond.com/orcaella

Belmond Orcaella was a river cruiser in Myanmar that sailed on the Irrawaddy and Chindwin rivers. It visited Yangon, Bagan, and Mandalay, as well as remote villages and temples near the borders of India. It was named after the Orcaella river dolphin. The river cruiser was designed in the style of the Irrawaddy Flotilla Company and launched by Orient-Express Hotels in July 2013. In 2014, the company changed its name to Belmond Ltd and the ship was renamed Belmond Orcaella. The river cruiser is no longer in operation.
