= Marilla Baker Ingalls =

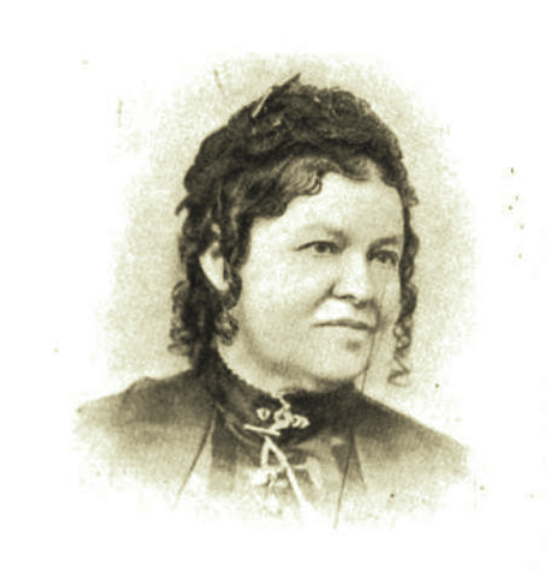

Personal life
- Born: Marilla Baker; November 25, 1828 Greenville, New York, U.S.
- Died: 17 December 1902 (aged 74) Thongze, Burma
- Resting place: Burma
- Spouse: Lovell Ingalls (m. 1850; died 1856)

Religious life
- Religion: Christianity
- Denomination: American Baptist Missionary Union missionary
- Profession: missionary

Marilla Baker Ingalls (née, Baker; November 25, 1828 – 17 December 1902) was an American Baptist Missionary Union missionary and writer. After marrying the widower, Rev. Lovell Ingalls, they sailed for Burma in 1851. Widowed in 1856, she continued working as a missionary in Burma till her death there in 1902. Ingalls had great influence among the Buddhist priests in spreading the word of Christianity. She established Bible societies, distributing tracts in their own language to the French, English, Burmese, Shans, Hindus and Karens. She opened a library for the benefit of the employees of the railway, and established branch libraries on these lines. Her work was most valuable among the men who went out into these countries to work for the syndicates building railroads, and also among the local workers. The various governments represented appreciated her work, and often assisted her.

Ingalls was the author of, Ocean Sketches of Life in Burmah (1858), A Golden Sheaf from the Judsons' Work at Ava (1881), and The Story of the Queen's Bible (1909). She was a constant and graphic writer to publications such as the Baptist Missionary Magazine.

== Early life ==
Marilla Baker was born in Greenville, New York, November 25, 1828. (Note: The Baptist magazine (1921), records Marilla's year of birth as: "about 1827".) She was the eldest daughter of Selah and Sally Baker.

She was a merry, light-hearted child, loved and loving, reading from the Bible to her blind grandfather, and showing at an early age a surprising knowledge of the book. One day at church a stranger, a missionary from Burma, addressed the people. On the desk before him was a little white idol from Burma. Ingalls listened with rapt attention and sympathy, and announced afterward to her companions that if she were grown up, she would go to Burma and tell the people that that idol was no god.

Ingalls enjoyed pretty clothes and romance novels, but she also read her Bible.

Selah Baker died, and her mother married again. When Marilla was about 20, the family moved to Wisconsin where her stepfather became pastor of the Baptist church at Eastport.

=== Engagement ===
She met Rev. Lovell Ingalls (b. Worcester, New York, August 21, 1808) at a missionary meeting at Racine, Wisconsin. On furlough, he became a guest at her family home where her stepfather, the pastor, felt privileged to talk with a returned missionary. Rev. Ingalls had been serving under Dr. Adoniram Judson in Burma. Ingalls' wife had died in 1845, and was buried in that foreign country. He had two young children. Now, the Eastport parsonage became his boarding-house. At first, Marilla hardly looked at him. He was grave and quiet, 20 years her senior. However, after many conversations regarding missionary life and her suitability for it, Rev. Ingalls and Marilla became engaged.

== Career ==
=== Missionary ===
In December 1850, at her home in Eastport, they were married. The mother of the bride watched the ceremony with many misgivings.

When the missionary brought his young wife to the meeting of the Missionary Union in Albany, New York just before they sailed, many looked askance at the young bride, who always wore pretty things and bright colors. "Just look at those curls", said one. "She seems to be always laughing," said another. One friend had the courage to ask Mr. Ingalls, "if he had not made a mistake." Ingalls replied, “No; I have not made a mistake, and you will live to see it."

==== To Burma, 1851 ====
Mr. and Mrs. Ingalls, with his young daughter from the first marriage, sailed for Burma on July 9, 1851. At Arakan, she taught school. She assisted her husband at Akyab in 1852. From there, they went to Rangoon in 1853, returning to the area of Rev. Ingalls' earliest field of work. Rev. Ingalls took possession of a small native house, with no flooring but the cold earth. It had two doors, one of which opened upon a broad veranda facing the busy street. In this verandah, Rev. and Mrs. Ingalls took their seat, and with a few of their Bibles and tracts spread out before them, endeavoured to attract the Burmans who passed by.

In December 1855, the Ingalls left Rangoon to evangelize in others towns of the region. They stopped at the villages of Sike gu and The lu, as well as a large town named 'Th'co'peinmeaning. From there, they proceeded to the Karen village called Co Doung. They visited the village of Tet thit, and the village of Cot tu yoh.

It was early in 1856 that the health of Rev. Ingalls, which had been long failing, rapidly declined. A short trip to Bengal was tried in the hope that a cessation from labor and a change of air and scene might improve his failing strength. Marilla was left at Rangoon to do what she could for the Burman converts, as there was no other missionary in the Burman department then at Rangoon, but he so rapidly declined at Calcutta, that she was hastily summoned by the return steamer. Knowing his great anxiety to get back to his work place that he might die there, they embarked to return to Rangoon. He died at sea, between Calcutta and Rangoon, March 14, 1856, at the age of 48. Before he died, he said to his young wife:— "I am glad I have given my life to these people, and if God does not close the way, work on, work on for the Burmans."

==== Return to the U.S. as a widow, 1857 ====
Now widowed, Marilla considered removing to Kemendine, a new Burman field, but stayed in Rangoon. In 1857, she returned to the U.S., bringing her husband's daughter home to be educated. In the same year, Ingalls published, Ocean Sketches of Life in Burmah.

==== Burma under appointment of the Missionary Union, 1858 ====
She sailed for Burma, November 26, 1858, this time under appointment of the Missionary Union for independent missionary work.

Four months later she reached Rangoon, April 26, 1859. Soon after, to the surprise of all and against the remonstrances of the leaders in the missionary work in Burma, Ingalls, now age 31, removed to Thonze (alternately spelled, Thongze, or Thongzai), then a large village in the jungle of lower Burma, on the borders of the Tharrawaddy District. Thonze was a remote village in that day, and Rangoon could only be reached by a boat trip of two days down the Hlaing River. But here she began the great work of her life. A house was built for her and she had the protection and assistance of Burmese Buddhists.

The Guide Book (1917–1918), speaking of the Thonze Mission, noted: "The mission compound here is a large tract of land obtained by the late Mrs. Ingalls, but now held by the Foreign Mission Society. There is a station day school, and the work is largely for Burmans. A motorboat is found useful in the evangelistic work. Population in field, 350,000; churches, three; church members, 555; baptisms, thirty-three; schools, two. Buildings: Mission house, chapel-school building, dormitory, teachers' and preachers' houses."

She at once took charge of the mission. The little church and its native pastor depended upon her for everything except preaching. She visited districts where no Caucasian woman had ever been seen, and with her native assistants made long evangelizing tours into the jungle. She superintended the building of the church, and later saw that the pastor had a comfortable parsonage. This church Ingalls used as a starting point from which to spread the Gospel in the surrounding country. Through her labors, other churches were formed in neighboring villages, colporteurs were sent out into the jungle, Sunday schools were formed, and modest chapels were built in the jungle hamlets. At one time she wrote:— "I have ten preachers under my care. All send or bring me a monthly report of their work. I have a meeting each Saturday morning for workers in the vicinity. I have four colporteurs, whom I send on trips or to work among the local population. They attend funerals, give books, and discuss doctrine, but are not able to perform pulpit duties. The laymen and their families do much colportage work. Each man and woman free from disease and care of infants is expected to make some trips for special teaching among the local people. There are also Bible women and school-teachers who come to the "mamma" for direction. This Thongzai church has a home mission which has sent at least one of its members to the regions beyond."

The superintending of all these operations of the church was but the beginning of Ingalls's labors. The needs of the local people were many. Her field lay among the Burmans, who are much more difficult to access than the Karens. She attempted to draw them to hear the Gospel. At the very outset, she erected a shed in the marketplace, hung it round with Bible pictures, and, with local helpers, talked to all whose curiosity led them to visit her. In her house, the most prominent room was called "The Burman Room." Its doors were open from dawn to bedtime. The walls were hung with maps and pictures; books were available. Her small study opened into this room, so she could step in at any time to help her assistants, to explain, argue, or instruct. Here came the Bible women and preachers to teach new converts in Bible doctrine. All day long, people came to ask questions or to listen. In fact, the Burman Room was the center of activity in the mission's work.

==== First furlough to the U.S., 1866 ====
In 1866, Ingalls came again to the U.S. for rest, and in her travels through this country, diligently sought for the right person to assist her. There was then no Woman's Board or Hasseltine House to give her what she wanted, but she finally secured Miss Rosa Adabis. It was during this visit that she gave two representations of "Life in Burma", in Boston, with the assistance of the young people of the Shawmut Avenue Church, whom she dressed in costumes, and drilled in their parts. Some of these young people dated their first interest in missions from that time.

==== Return to Burma, 1868 ====
In 1868, she returned to Burma.

In 1871, after the formation of the Woman's Baptist Foreign Missionary Society, Ingalls gladly welcomed Miss Kate Evans, their first missionary, to assist her, and open a school,. For thirty years, Ingalls and Evans worked together.

When the Dacoit Rebellion broke out, a price of 10,000 rupees was set on Ingalls' head. She was urged to return home, as many years had passed since her last visit. Her mother in her declining years longed to see her; but Ingalls felt she could not leave her people, lest they lose courage and the Dacoits become emboldened, so she stood at her post till the rebellion was over.

In 1877, the railroad from Rangoon reached Thongzai. Ingalls saw here an opportunity to begin a new line of work in giving books and tracts at the depots and in the railway carriages. Her preacher gave out 60 to 80 tracts each morning. The Bible Society sent English Bibles, and she distributed tracts in their own language to the English, French, Burmans, Shans, Hindus, and Karens. Soon she had a library of 120 volumes and a reading room in the depot at Thongzai. These were for the use of the employees of the railroad. In the depots at other places on the line, she has established "branch libraries", and placed tract distributors. On her occasional visits of inspection to these libraries, she took with her a staff of local workers, and made her stay the occasion of missionary work among the local population. At timess she has had socials and lectures in the libraries for the railway men. From the U.S., friends sent money to support her preachers and Bible women, besides books, and even eyeglasses. The English government and the railway officials helped on her libraries, and even the local population contributed toward her tract distribution.

Ingalls showed ability in convincing Buddhist priests to convert to Christianity. Her article in the Baptist Missionary Magazine for November, 1893, and also one in May, 1894, told the story of this work in her own words.

==== Second furlough to the U.S., 1889 ====
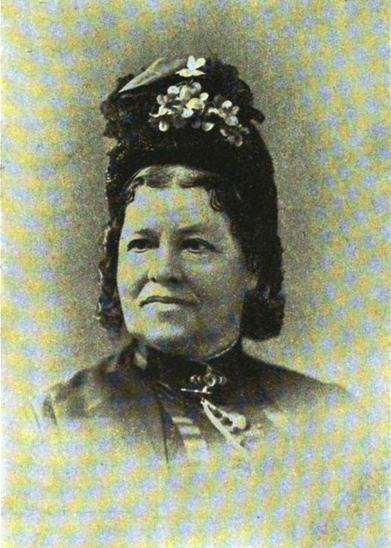
(undated)

In 1889, she returned to the U.S. for her last visit. Her mother and only brother had died the year before. Twenty years had made great changes in her country. As she visited many cities and towns, her eyes and ears were open to all she could take back to help uplift the people of Burma. Her mind constantly dwelling on this one theme affected her health, so that her physician said, "Go somewhere where you will hear nothing about Burma." She chose Washington, D.C. as most likely to meet that dictum. She had many friends, and was taken everywhere, among others to a convention of female suffragists, where she listened in amazement to what was said of the injustice of men to women. She was invited and urged to speak, but declined. As they still insisted, she rose and said, "My father was a man, my brother was a man, my husband was a man, and I love the whole race of men for their sake," then sat down, and was allowed to keep quiet. Nothing, however, impressed her more than the work that had been accomplished by the Woman's Baptist Foreign Missionary Society in arousing interest among the home churches. Ingalls had brought many curios, costumes, pictures, and so forth, back with her to illustrate life in Burma; and in Boston, New York, and Philadelphia she gave interesting exhibitions and lectures. She fully realized that this was her lest visit to the U.S.

==== Final return to Burma, 1891 ====
She sailed back to Burma in 1891. Upon her arrival in Burma, she resumed her work in all its varied departments, and for ten more years, labored unceasingly. Then her strength began to fail, and she could not take the jungle trips as formerly. Most of her letter writing was done after ten at night, her correspondence being immense. Generally she was more interesting as a speaker than as a writer, but she felt that her sphere was to work. She had many influential friends in England and a wide acquaintance among the English residents in Burma, but rarely accepted their invitations, feeling that to enter into their social life would divert time and strength from her work. In a letter to a Baptist publication, dated October 24, 1902, Ingalls mentions: "I have not had my usual strength... I am weak, but I have had my days of strength, and do not complain. I do not need better doctors, nor need to go home for a change..."

=== Author ===
Ingalls was the author of, Ocean Sketches of Life in Burmah (1858), A Golden Sheaf from the Judsons' Work at Ava (1881), and The Story of the Queen's Bible (1909). Ocean Sketches of Life in Burmah (Philadelphia, American Baptist Publication Society, 1858) contains gravings, including one of which represents Burma as it appeared when first visited by Christian missionaries. A Golden Sheaf from the Judsons' Work at Ava (Woman's Missionary Society, 1881) was a tract written by Ingalls in her usual graphic style. It is a sketch of the life of Mah Po, the wife of one of the ministers of the Burman king, who carried food to Ann Hasseltine Judson while her husband, Dr. Adoniram Judson, was imprisoned at Oung-pen-la. The Story of the Queen's Bible (Boston, Woman's Baptist Foreign Missionary Society, 1909) was published posthumously in 1909. The story, related by Ingalls, was retold by Sarah Frances Whiting.

She was a constant and graphic writer. She kept in touch with many churches and friends. She knew how to make the events of her life live in the messages that came to the U.S. so that she was continually receiving funds from different sources for the various activities of her life. Even though she made long stays in Burma, her writings for the Baptist Missionary Magazine and other papers made people interested in her work.

== Death ==
Marilla Baker Ingalls died in Thongze, 17 December 1902. She was buried, according to her wish, in the jungle cemetery of Burma.

== Selected works ==
- Ocean Sketches of Life in Burmah, 1857
- A Golden Sheaf from the Judsons' Work at Ava, 1881

=== Posthumous publications ===
- The Story of the Queen's Bible, 1909
