= Minhla Township =

Minhla Township may refer to:

- Minhla Township, Bago
- Minhla Township, Magway
