= Gyobingauk =

Gyobingauk ကြို့ပင်ကောက်
- Town
- Location in Burma
- Coordinates: 18°13′N 95°39′E
- Country: Myanmar
- Region: Bago Region
- District: Tharrawaddy District
- Township: Gyobingauk Township
- Time zone: UTC+6.30 (MST)

Gyobingauk is a town and seat of Gyobingauk Township, Tharrawaddy District, in the Bago Region of southern-central Burma. It lies approximately 10 kilometres north of Okpho along National Highway 2. It is located roughly 185 kilometres north of Yangon. The town has a Roman Catholic history with missionaries. It was reorganized in 1951 as the city headquarters. It is said that the city was named after GyoBinGauk because of buckling Gyo Tree's location at long times ago.

== Health care ==
- Gyobingauk General Hospital
- Aung Myin Myint Mo Hospital
- GBK Hospital
- Gyobingauk Traditional Medicine Hospital

== Notable people ==
- U WinTin (HanTharwady) 1930-2014 - journalist
- Tay Za (1967-) - businessman
