= Frederick Charles Kennedy =

Scottish entrepreneur

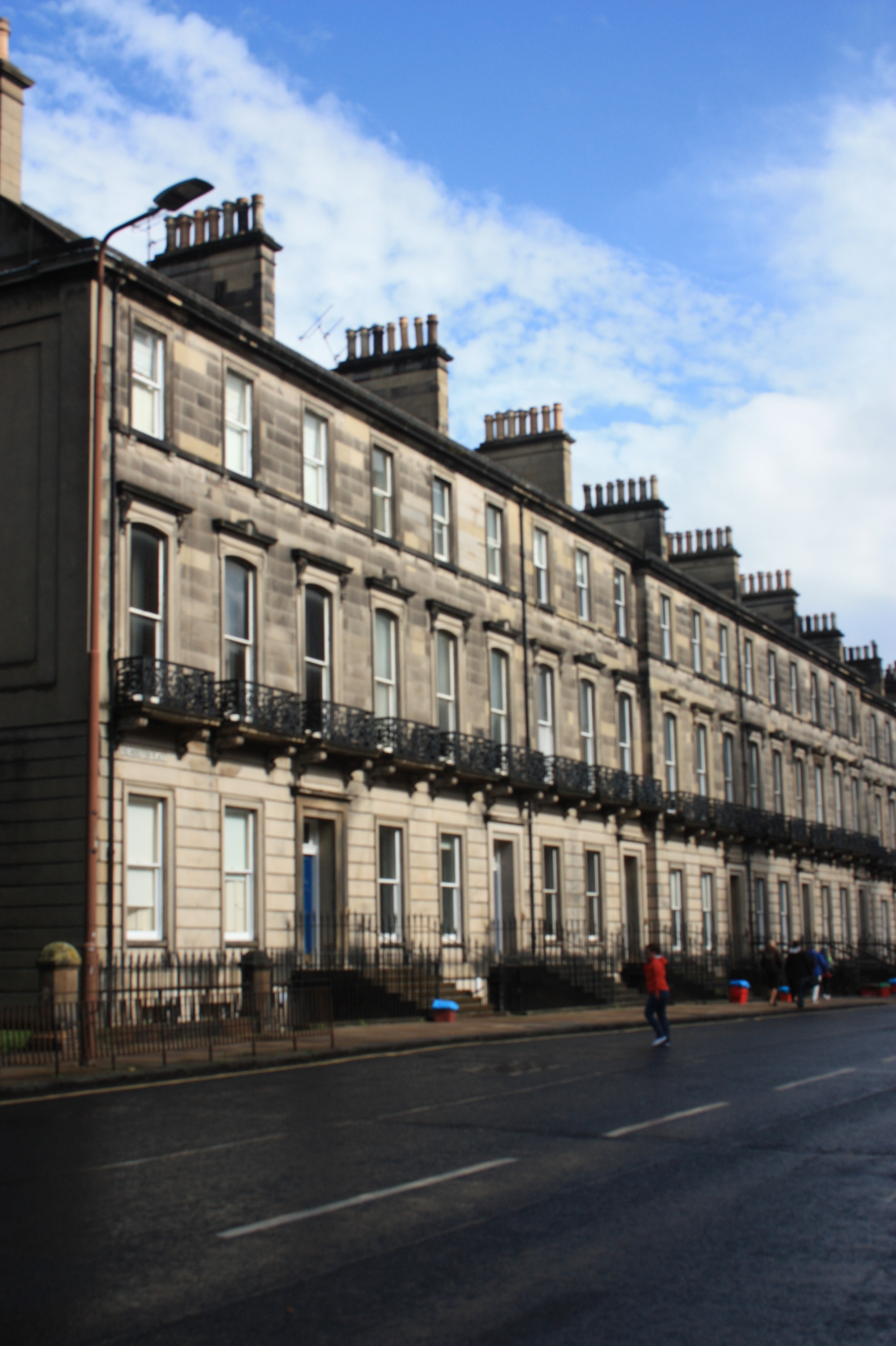
11 to 21 Palmerston Place, Edinburgh

Frederick Charles Kennedy CIE (1849–1916) was a Scottish entrepreneur in Asia who came to command and direct the largest river fleet of the 19th century.

== Life ==
He was born in 1849 the son of Peter Cuming Kennedy, a tweed merchant. He trained as a civil engineer but instead joined the Glasgow-founded Irrawaddy Flotilla Company (founded 1852) which traded in Burma. He sailed out and was in Rangoon by 1877. The company had been "founded" by the British government in 1852 originally in reaction to the Second Anglo-Burmese War and had been sold off as a private enterprise in 1865. In October 1877 he replaced Archibald Colquhon as Assistant Manager.

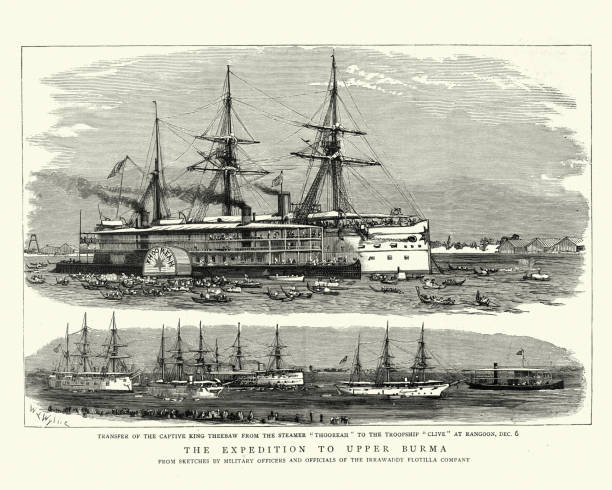
Transfer of the captive King Theebaw from the Steamer Thooreah to the Troopship Clive at Rangoon, 6 December(1885

In the Third Anglo-Burmese War of 1885 to 1887, Kennedy was Manager of what was, by then, the largest flotilla of river boats in the world: 35 paddle-steamers, 63 cargo ships and several launches (some of which were armed). He co-operated with the government in the transportation of a large "expeditionary force" into inner Burma. The largest of these ships was the "Thooreah" which held 2100 men. In total the flotilla moved over 9000 British and sepoy soldiers upriver and played a vital role in the war. Other ships in use included the PS Ashley Eden and the PS Palow (armed). The latter was used in the attack on Minhla Forts in November 1885.

In 1886, in recognition of his contribution to the war, Queen Victoria created him a Companion of the Order of the Indian Empire (CIE). He appears to be one of the few individuals to have been granted this award without any involvement in the administration or direct history of India itself.

He retired from the IFC in 1903 and was presented with a highly ornate silver tea service.

He returned to Edinburgh in 1906 to take on the role of the Director of the London and Edinburgh Shopping Company based at 8 Commercial Street in Leith. He lived at 15 Palmerston Place in Edinburgh for the remainder of his life. He died on 17 April 1916 and was buried in Dean Cemetery in the west of the city. The grave lies in the north Victorian extension, to the south-west, on a wall backing onto the original cemetery.

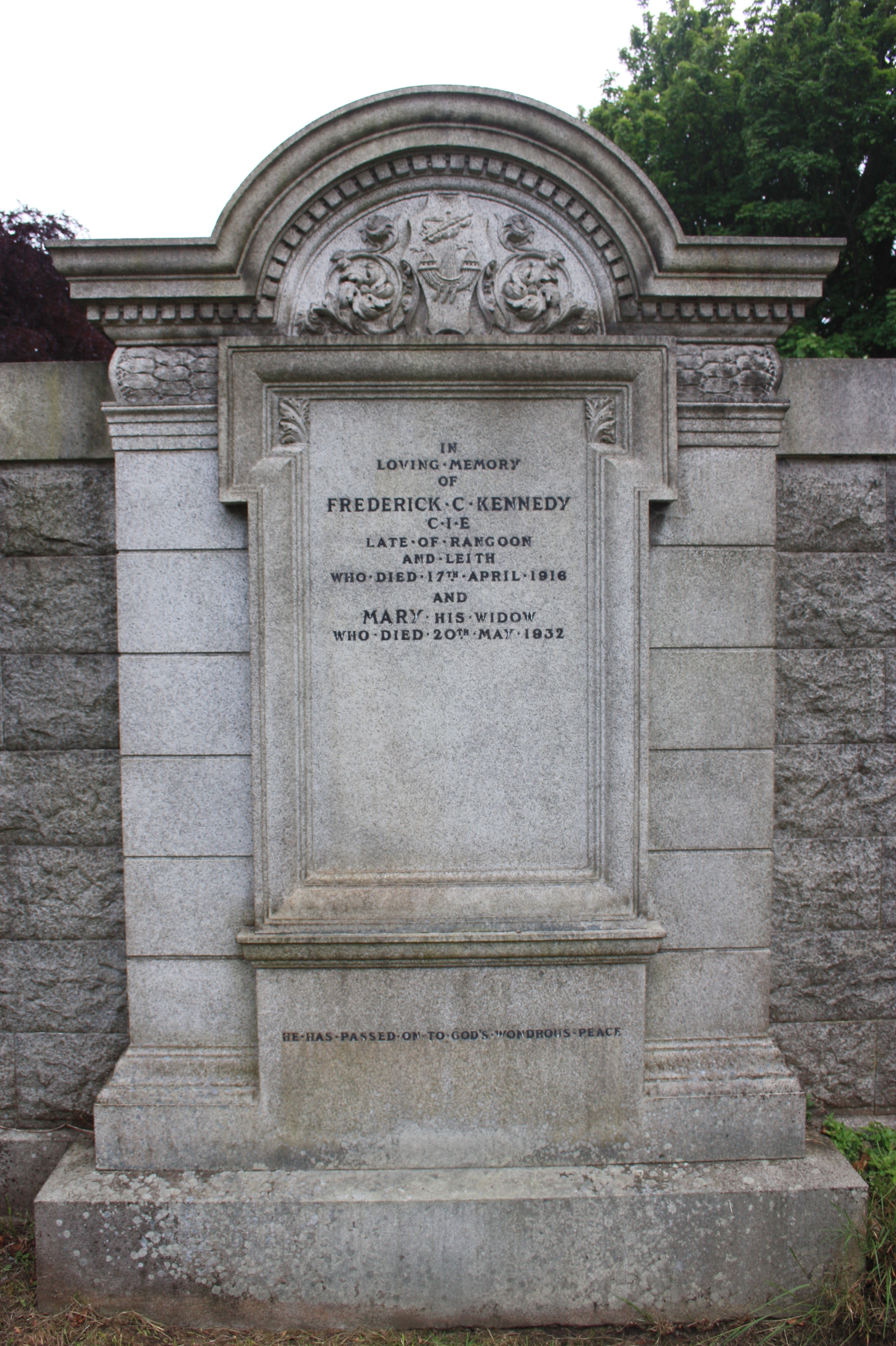
The grave of Frederick Charles Kennedy, Dean Cemetery

On his death he left £250,000.

== Family ==
In 1881 he was married to Mary Cuddie (d. 1932) in Falkirk.
