= Monyo Township =

Township in Bago Region, Myanmar

Coordinates: 18°06′40″N 95°27′42″E

- Township
- Location in Thayarwaddy district
- Country: Myanmar
- Region: Bago Region
- District: Tharrawaddy District
- Capital: Monyo
- Time zone: UTC+6.30 (MST)

Monyo Township is a township in Tharrawaddy District in the Bago Region of Myanmar. The principal town is Monyo.
