= Minhla, Bago =

Minhla မင်းလှ
- Town
- Location in Myanmar
- Coordinates: 17°58′40″N 95°42′25″E
- Country: Myanmar
- Region: Bago Region
- District: Tharrawaddy District
- Township: Minhla Township
- Time zone: UTC+6.30 (MST)

Minhla is a town and seat of Minhla Township, Tharrawaddy District, in the Bago Region of southern-central Myanmar. It lies approximately 20 kilometres south of Okpho off National Highway 2. It is located roughly 155 kilometres north of Yangon. Its population in 1908 was 2553. Minhla was occupied during the Third Anglo-Burmese War.
