= Lovell Ingalls =

19th century American missionary

Lovell Ingalls (1808 – 5 March 1856) was a ninetheenth century American missionary and a member of the American Baptist Mission to Burma. He was married to Marilla Baker Ingalls.

== History ==
Ordained in 1837, Lovell Ingalls spent 17 years as a missionary, working alongside noted missionary Adoniram Judson, before returning to the U.S. following the death of his first wife, Marcia Dawes Ingalls. He kept a diary, which later was published and is a primary source of information about missionary work of that era. While in America he met Marilla Baker, who had long been interested in foreign missions. The couple married and went to Myanmar in 1851. Ingalls died in 1856, survived by his wife and Amelia, his daughter from his first marriage. Marilla Baker brought the child to America for her education, and returned to continue her work as a missionary in Burma, where she died in 1902. Amelia Lovell remained in America, where she married, had children, and died in 1903.

His correspondence is part of the International Ministries - Missionary Correspondence Collection of the American Baptist Historical Society Archives, available at Mercer University.
