= Gyobingauk Township =

Township in Bago Region, Myanmar

Coordinates: 18°13′54″N 95°38′59″E

- Township
- Location in Thayarwaddy district
- Country: Myanmar
- Region: Bago Region
- District: Tharrawaddy District
- Capital: Gyobingauk
- Time zone: UTC+6.30 (MST)

Gyobingauk Township is a township in Tharrawaddy District in the Bago Region of Myanmar. The principal town is Gyobingauk.
