= Tharrawaddy, Myanmar =

Tharrawaddy သာယာဝတီ Tharyarwaddy
- City
- Location in Myanmar
- Coordinates: 17°39′06″N 95°47′08″E
- Country: Myanmar
- Region: Bago Region
- District: Tharrawaddy
- Township: Tharrawaddy

Area
  - City: 3.39 sq mi (8.8 km^{2})

Population (2019)
  - City: 15,634
  - Metro (Note: town + Thonze): 38,116
- Time zone: UTC+6.30 (MMT)

Tharrawaddy (Burmese: သာယာဝတီ, also spelt Thayarwaddy) is a city in western Bago Region of lower Myanmar. It is the administrative seat of Tharrawaddy District and Tharrawaddy Township. It locates on the main Yangon-Pyay road and 76 miles away at the north of Yangon. The town is divided into 8 urban wards.

== History ==
The current town was built when the region was under British rule, in the first British temporary seat at Thonze. However, Thonze is populated for district offices. Therefore, the town was moved two miles north of Thonze and the new district capital was built in 1878.

During the Galon Rebellion, the self-proclaimed king Saya San moved to Tharrawaddy after a coronation in Yangon in December 1930. He proclaimed a new royal city by the name of Buddharaja Myo (lit. 'Buddhist King's City') on Alaungtang Hill in the city, ceremoniall plotting it out with space for the proper retinue of five queens, four ministers, and four regiments. Tharrawaddy, like most of Lower Burma, suffered severe economic dislocation during the ‘Hoover Slump’. The Great Depression of 1930 had a devastating impact on rice prices. The high population density and the concentration of land ownership in central Burma stoked disaffected landless laborers, whom blamed the colonial government for both their inability to work the land independently and for decline of their real incomes as rice worker. Rural cultivators were quick to respond to Saya San's appeals of anti-tax rhetoric mixed with Buddhist traditions and prophecies. Violence broke out first on 22 December of the year in Tharrawaddy and escalated, spreading to many cities in Burma. The revolt was defeated after two years in 1932 with Saya San being hanged in Tharrawaddy.

The current town was created in 1972 by decree of the Ministry of Home Affairs based on the historical name of the town.

== Climate ==
Climate data for Tharrawaddy, Myanmar (1981–2010)
Month	Jan	Feb	Mar	Apr	May	Jun	Jul	Aug	Sep	Oct	Nov	Dec	Year
Mean daily maximum °C (°F)	32.1 (89.8)	34.9 (94.8)	37.6 (99.7)	39.3 (102.7)	35.8 (96.4)	31.2 (88.2)	30.5 (86.9)	30.4 (86.7)	31.4 (88.5)	32.5 (90.5)	32.3 (90.1)	31.3 (88.3)	33.3 (91.9)
Mean daily minimum °C (°F)	13.3 (55.9)	14.8 (58.6)	17.9 (64.2)	21.8 (71.2)	23.1 (73.6)	23.0 (73.4)	22.7 (72.9)	22.8 (73.0)	22.7 (72.9)	22.3 (72.1)	19.4 (66.9)	15.5 (59.9)	19.9 (67.8)
Average rainfall mm (inches)	0.9 (0.04)	3.0 (0.12)	3.5 (0.14)	24.2 (0.95)	212.8 (8.38)	485.5 (19.11)	516.1 (20.32)	448.2 (17.65)	318.2 (12.53)	154.0 (6.06)	60.6 (2.39)	0.9 (0.04)	2,227.9 (87.71)
Source: Norwegian Meteorological Institute

== List of rulers of Tharrawaddy ==
=== Pinya and Ava periods ===
Name	Term From	Term Until	Relationship to predecessor(s)	Overlord(s)	Notes
...
Saw Shwe Khet	by early 1422	early 1427	Appointed	Thihathu of Ava; Min Hla of Ava; Kale Kye-Taung Nyo; Mohnyin Thado	
Anawrahta Saw	early 1427	c. October 1446	Appointed	Binnya Ran I of Hanthawaddy	Hanthawaddy vassal
Saw Shwe Khet	c. October 1446	1460	Appointed	Narapati I of Ava; Thihathura of Ava; Minkhaung II	
Thado Minsaw	1460	1482	Appointed	Thihathura of Ava; Minkhaung II	

=== Prome period ===
Name	Term From	Term Until	Relationship to predecessor(s)	Overlord(s)	Notes
Thado Minsaw?	1482	1525			King of Prome (1482–1527)
Minye Nawrahta	by early 1525 (Note: late 886 ME (early 1525))	1542?		Thado Minsaw	in rebellion; ally of Toungoo (1531/32)

=== Toungoo period ===
Name	Term From	Term Until	Relationship to predecessor(s)	Overlord(s)	Notes
...
Minye Kyawhtin	by October 1564	27 February 1574	Appointed	Bayinnaung	
Nawrahta Minsaw	27 February 1574	28 January 1579	Appointed	Bayinnaung	
...

=== Konbaung period ===
Name	Term From	Term Until	Relationship to predecessor(s)	Overlord(s)	Notes
...
Thado Minhla Nawrahta	by 1808	?			Also lord of Thayet

== Bibliography ==
- Kala, U (2006) [1724]. Maha Yazawin (in Burmese). Vol. 1–3 (4th printing ed.). Yangon: Ya-Pyei Publishing.
- Maha Sithu (2012) [1798]. Myint Swe; Kyaw Win; Thein Hlaing (eds.). Yazawin Thit (in Burmese). Vol. 1–3 (2nd printing ed.). Yangon: Ya-Pyei Publishing.
- Maung Maung Tin, U (2004) [1905]. Konbaung Set Maha Yazawin (in Burmese). Vol. 1–3. Yangon: Department of Universities History Research, University of Yangon.
- Royal Historical Commission of Burma (2003) [1832]. Hmannan Yazawin (in Burmese). Vol. 1–3. Yangon: Ministry of Information, Myanmar.
