= Okpho =

Okpho အုတ်ဖို Okpo
- Town
- Location in Burma
- Coordinates: 18°7′N 95°40′E
- Country: Myanmar
- Region: Bago Region
- District: Tharrawaddy District
- Township: Okpho Township

Population (2014)Urban
  - Total: 11,525
- Time zone: UTC+6.30 (MST)

Okpho (Burmese: အုတ်ဖို; also spelt Okpo) is a small town and seat of Okpho Township, Tharrawaddy District, in the Bago Region of southern-central Myanmar. It lies south of Gyobingauk and north of Minhla. It contains a hospital, a pagoda, and an open ground in the town centre. It is located 177 kilometres (110 mi) north of Yangon. The Okpho Railway Station is operated by Myanmar Railways and the town also contains a police station.

Father J.B Bringaud was reported to have been in the area 4 miles (6.4 km) west of Okpho in November 1862.

The population of Okpho's urban area is 11,525 as of 2014, while Okpho Township's population is 126,662.

== Notable people ==
- Chit Maung (1913–1945) - journalist, patriotic writer who worked for Bogyoke Aung San, the father of Aung San Suu Kyi. He was Chief Editor of New Light of Burma. Later his own Journalgyaw Newspaper was well known in Burma.
- U Saw - Politician and assassin of Aung San and several Burmese Martyrs
