= Meiktila Lake =

Lake Meiktila
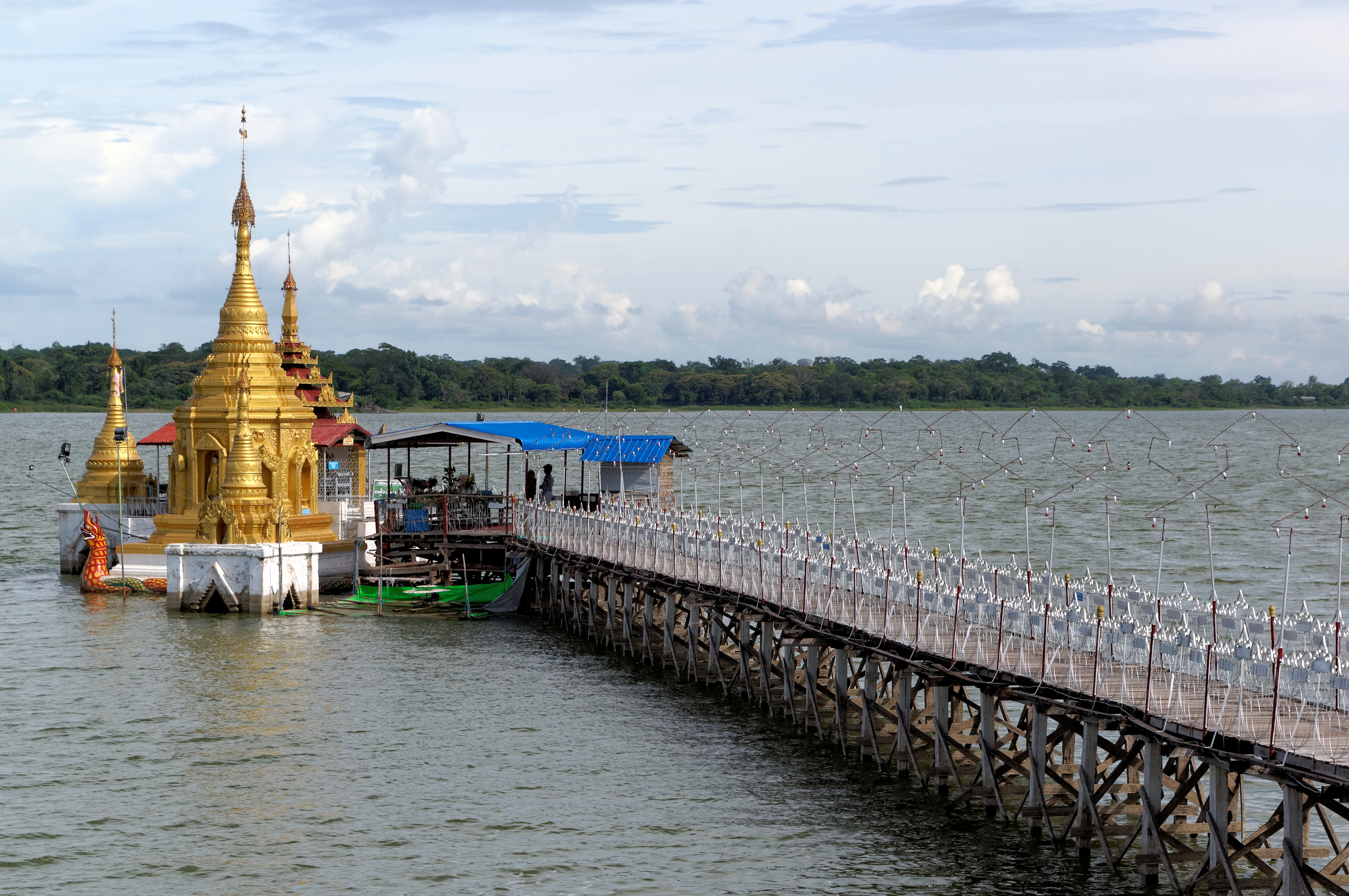

- Location within Myanmar
- Coordinates: 20°52′N 95°51′E
- Type: reservoir
- Basin countries: Burma
- Max. length: 7 mi (11 km)
- Surface area: 3.5 mi^{2} (9.1 km^{2})
- Sections/sub-basins: north lake, south lake

Lake Meiktila (Burmese: မိတ္ထီလာကန် [meɪʔtʰìlà kàɰ̃]) is a lake located near Meiktila, Myanmar. It is 7 miles (11 km) long, averages half a mile across, and covers an area of 3.5 square miles (9.1 km^{2}). Mone-Dai dam supplies water to the lake. It is divided into two parts, north lake and south lake. It is divided by a bridge across the lake. The lake is an artificial irrigation and water reservoir.

== History ==
In accordance with the old saying "Pond in Taungthamun and Lake in Meiktila", Taungthaman is the largest pond and Meiktila is the largest lake in Myanmar. Then King Kutha redammed. After that 17 other Myanmar kings in different dynasties mended it and it is later known as "Mingalar Lake ". It is also said that the powerful and glorious King Thiridamarthawka Lurch was one of them. Then King Anawrahta of Pagan renovated it in 414 Burmese year by the method of modern irrigation. He also established, in the upper and lower parts of Meiktila Lake, nine Theins (Buddhist ordination hall), nine high hill, nine pools and nine ponds. Later on, his grandson, King Alaungsithu succeeded damming the Meiktila Lake. There are also 24 historical pagodas in and near by the town. Meiktila Lake has been the only water resource for the residents of Meiktila and for the peasants for about 1000 years.

During the reign of King Swa Saw Ke of Ava, Nga Nyo from Winzinn village was famous for his wisdom. Later, he became the king's counselor named Winzinn Minnyarzar and later honoured by the king as his counselor concerning his wise knowledge on the statue found on the bank of lake.

== Pagoda festival ==
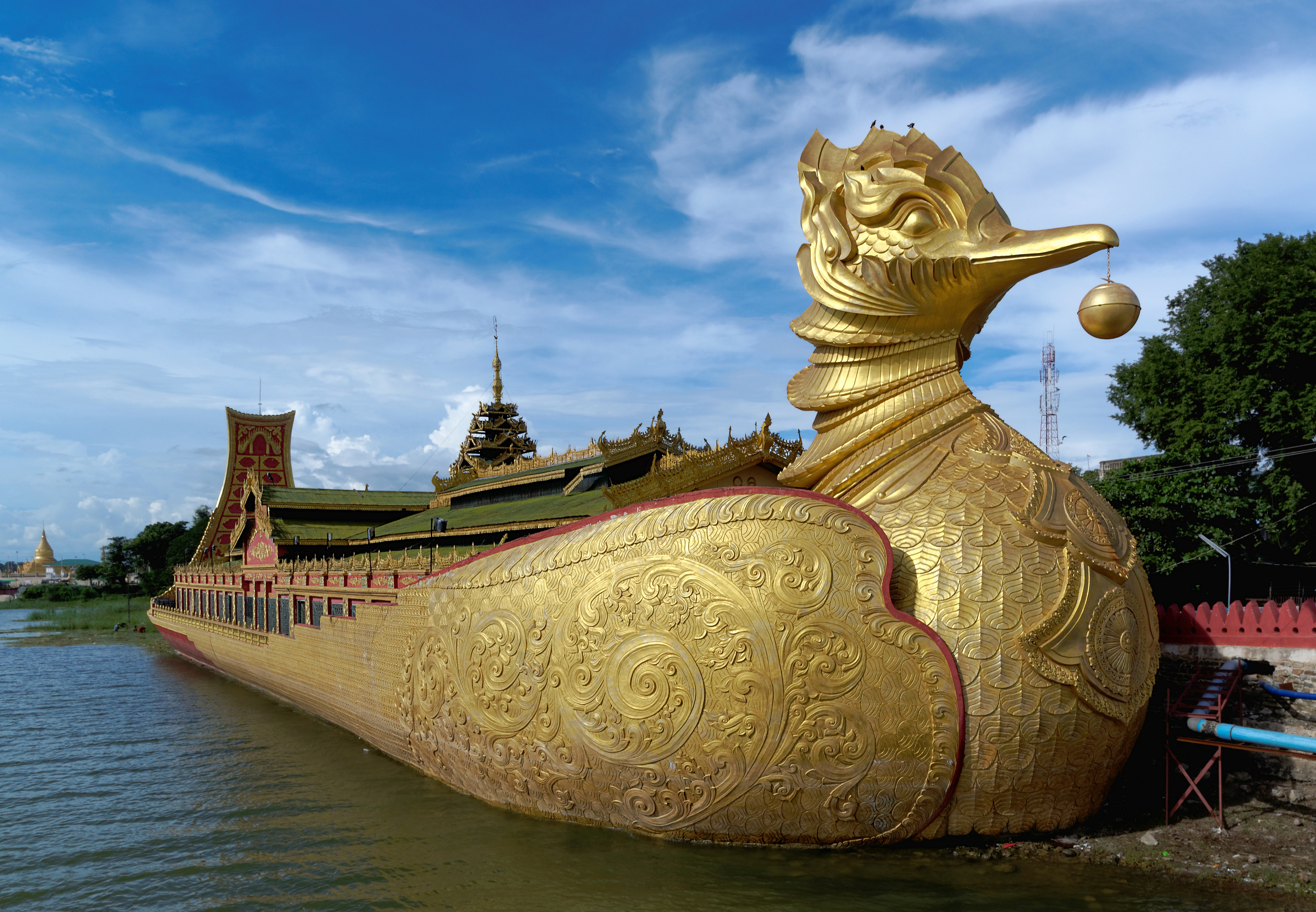
Phaung Daw U Padoda

On the eastern part of Meiktila Lake, King Alaungsithu built the Phaung Daw U Pagoda at the place where his raft halted during his journey. The pagoda festival is annually held in Myanmar month of Tawthalin. In Meiktila, there are many other famous pagodas such as Shwemyintin Padoda, built by King Thiridamarthawka in the east of the Lake, Nagayon Pagoda by King Narapatisithu and Auntagu Pagoda in the center of the lake.
