= Tharrawaddy Township =

Township in Bago Region, Myanmar

Coordinates: 17°39′03″N 95°44′37″E

- Township
- Location in Thayarwaddy district
- Country: Myanmar
- Region: Bago Region
- District: Tharrawaddy District
- Capital: Tharrawaddy
- Time zone: UTC+6.30 (MMT)

Tharrawaddy Township is a township in Tharrawaddy District in the Bago Region of Myanmar. The principal town is Tharrawaddy.
