= Okpho Township =

Township in Bago Region, Myanmar

- Township
- Location in Thayarwaddy district
- Coordinates: 18°07′40″N 95°40′25″E
- Country: Myanmar
- Region: Bago Region
- District: Tharrawaddy District
- Capital: Okpho
- Time zone: UTC+6.30 (MST)

Okpho Township or Okpo Township is a township in Tharrawaddy District in the Bago Region of Myanmar. The principal town is Okpho.

On 25 March 2013, Muslim house and mosques were attacked by Buddhist mobs in the township following similar violence in other parts of Burma.
