= Minhla Township, Bago =

Township in Bago Region, Myanmar

Coordinates: 17°58′44″N 95°42′22″E

Minhla Township
- Township
- Location in Thayarwaddy district
- Country: Myanmar
- Region: Bago Region
- District: Tharrawaddy District
- Capital: Minhla
- Time zone: UTC+6.30 (MST)

Minhla Township is a township in Tharrawaddy District in the Bago Region of Burma (Myanmar). The principal town is Minhla. In 1908 it was reported that the township covered an area of 708 square miles (1,830 km^{2}) and in 1901 had a total population of 42, 120, with 2553 people in the main town. Minhla was occupied during the Third Anglo-Burmese War. The township is hilly, and is inhabited by the Arakan Yoma.
