= Irrawaddy Flotilla Company =

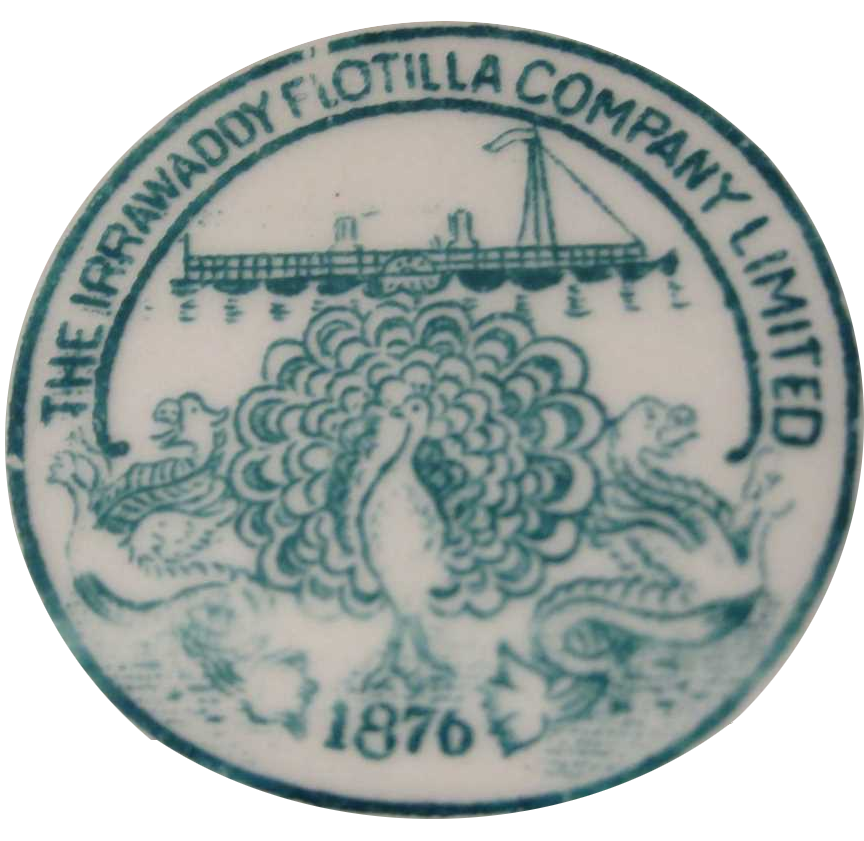
Seal of the Irrawaddy Flotilla Company

The Irrawaddy Flotilla Company (IFC) was a Scottish-owned passenger and cargo ferry company that operated on the Irrawaddy River in Burma from 1865 until the late 1940s. It was managed by P Henderson & Company from Glasgow. At its peak in the late 1920s, the IFC fleet was the largest fleet of riverboats in the world, consisting of over 600 vessels carrying some 8-9 million passengers and 1¼ million tons of cargo a year.

== Beginnings ==
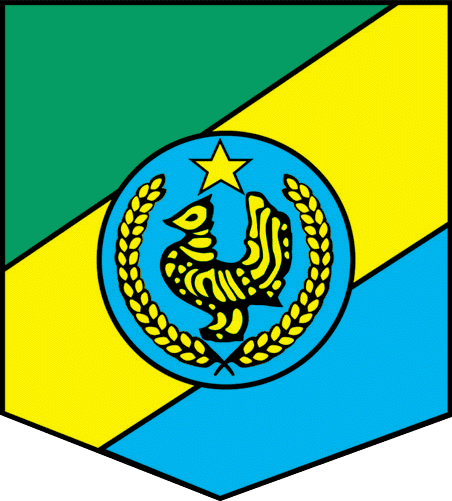
Seal of Myanma Inland Water Transport

The IFC was formed in 1865 as the Irrawaddy Flotilla and Burmese Steam Navigation Co Ltd, primarily to ferry troops up and down the Irrawaddy River and delta. Soon, the company was carrying passengers, rice, government stores, and mail from Rangoon to Prome, Thayetmyo and Mandalay, and then extended in 1868 to Bhamo. In 1875, the company's name was shortened to the Irrawaddy Flotilla Company. Although registered in Glasgow, the operational headquarters were in Rangoon, with a major shipyard across the river at Dalla.

The company's services became indispensable to the oil fields up river at Yenangyaung and Chauk for carrying supplies and heavy equipment. Partly because the railway to Mandalay followed the path of the Sittaung River rather than the Irrawaddy River, the company stayed relevant and useful well into the twentieth century, even after independence from Britain.

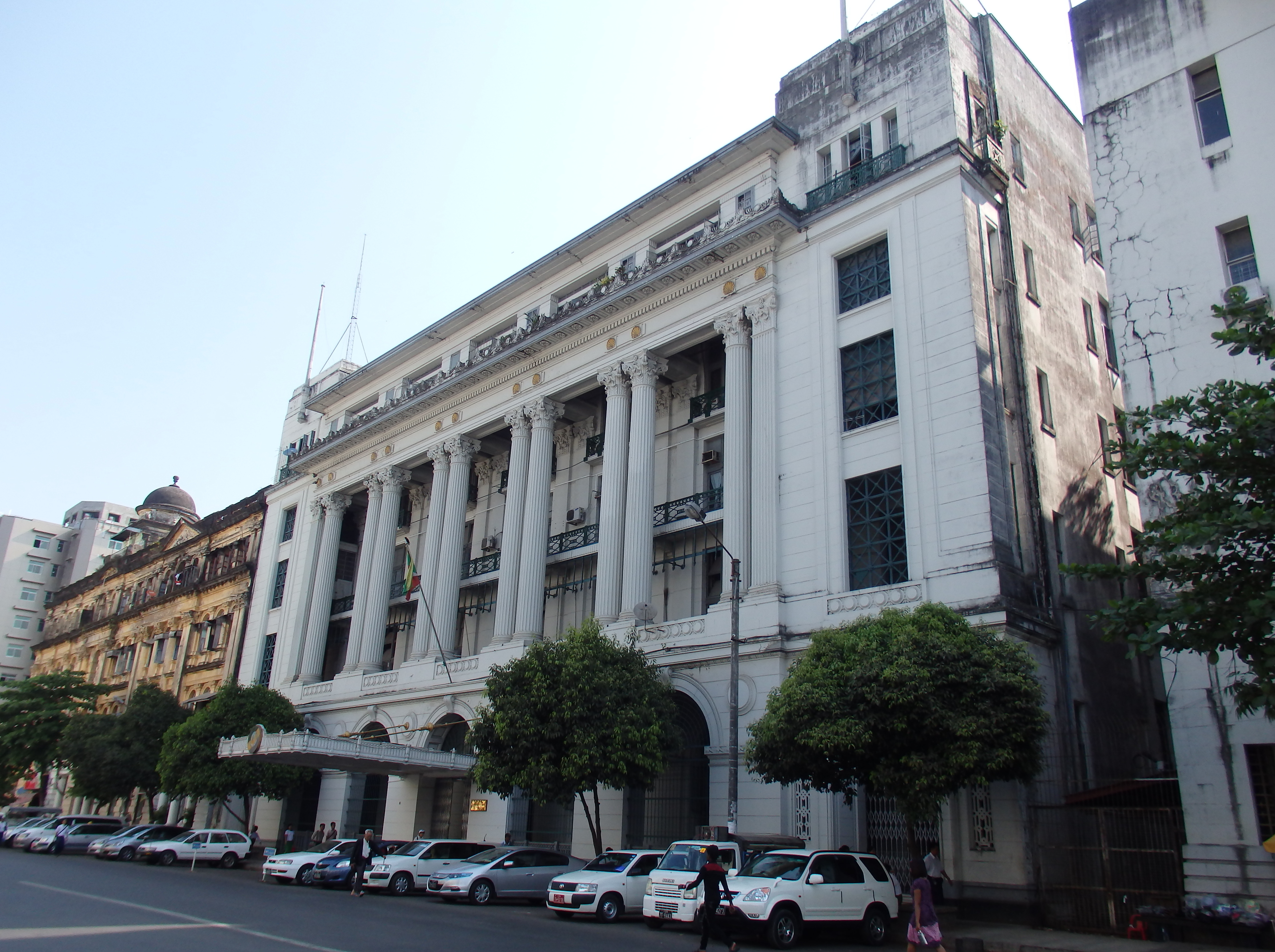
Former Irrawaddy Flotilla Company building in Yangon, which now houses the Inland Water Transport

The ships, most of which were paddle steamers, were generally built in Scotland before being dismantled and transported to Burma for reassembly. The flotilla, privately owned but with a quasi-official status, undertook many functions typically handled by government organizations. These included sorting and delivering mail, overseeing river conservancy, ensuring the free flow of transport for all river users, and providing ships in times of war. In addition, the IFC was responsible for transporting royalty and important figures. Notably, Dalhousie, Curzon, and most successive viceroys undertook tours of Burma, often traveling on the Irrawaddy amid great fanfare and pomp. For these voyages, the ships were repainted in white, with yellow funnels, the official government colors.

At the time, IFC ships lacked wheelhouses, allowing the commander to move freely on the open foredeck, providing an unobstructed view up- and downriver. A second steering position on the main deck, primarily used at night, allowed for better visibility, as the searchlight on the upper deck made it difficult to see clearly from above.

== Passengers ==
Line steamers or slow cargo steamers were common ways to get from Rangoon to Mandalay, the former taking eight days to reach its destination while the latter making many stops in river ports. The Irrawaddy Flotilla Company steamer journey was an established itinerary route in Burma.

The first-class section was located at the front of the ship, catering to European businessmen, civil servants, army officers, and well-heeled tourists. These passengers enjoyed the highest level of comfort and service, with access to teak and brass cabins, fine dining in the saloon, and more privacy compared to the other classes. In contrast, the second-class section was located in the aft section of the upper deck, where Indian money lenders, Chinese pawnbrokers, Armenian bankers, and German-Jewish merchants typically found their place. While they experienced a more modest standard of living, the service and amenities were still of high quality.

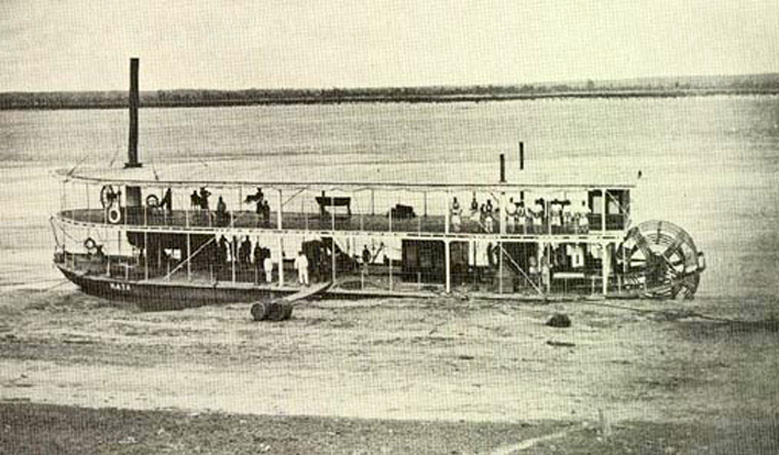

In the central section of the open deck, around 3,000 deck passengers would sit on their bundles of luggage, picnicking or visiting the aft canteen. These passengers were often from the local Burman community and were a mix of various social backgrounds, forming a vibrant community of travelers. This arrangement mirrored the social and economic structure of colonial Burma, with Europeans occupying the front, wealthy traders in the rear, and local Burmans in the middle, often chatting and smoking cheroots, creating a unique blend of cultures and classes aboard the ship.

== Sinking of the Fleet ==
In 1942, the entire IFC fleet was deliberately sunk as part of an “act of denial” when the Imperial Japanese Army invaded Burma during World War II. With the Japanese forces advancing through the country, British colonial authorities made the decision to scuttle the fleet to prevent it from falling into enemy hands. The fleet, once a symbol of colonial infrastructure and a lifeline for transportation and communication along the Irrawaddy River, was strategically destroyed to deny the Japanese access to the vessels, which could have been used for military or logistical purposes.

The sinking of the fleet marked a pivotal moment in the collapse of British control in Burma. As the war intensified, the riverboats that had once carried both passengers and cargo throughout the country were now relegated to the riverbeds. The scuttling of the ships was not just a military strategy but also an emotional loss for many who had relied on the IFC's services, from the colonial elite to local communities dependent on the vessels for trade and communication. The fleet, which had once served as a vital component of the colonial infrastructure, was lost, and with it, an era of river transportation that had shaped the region for decades. The sinking of the fleet left a legacy in the history of Burma and marked the beginning of a new chapter under Japanese occupation, altering both the geopolitical landscape and the lives of those who had relied on the IFC for decades.

== Future ==
In 1998, Paul Strachan discovered an original Clyde-built steamer called the Pandaw and arranged for its lease and restoration. Paul and Roser Strachan revived the Irrawaddy Flotilla Company, becoming the first since the colonial era to offer river cruises along the Irrawaddy River, which stretches over a thousand miles from the sea. In the last 30 years, the new IFC has changed its name to Pandaw, with its operating headquarters in Ho Chi Minh, Vietnam.

== Quote ==
The paddle steamers of the IFC inspired the famous lines penned by Rudyard Kipling:

By the old Moulmein Pagoda, lookin' lazy at the sea,
There's a Burma girl a-settin', and I know she thinks o' me;
For the wind is in the palm-trees, and the temple-bells they say:
"Come you back, you British soldier; come you back to Mandalay!"

Come you back to Mandalay,
Where the old Flotilla lay:
Can't you 'ear their paddles chunkin' from Rangoon to Mandalay?
On the road to Mandalay,
Where the flyin'-fishes play,
An' the dawn comes up like thunder outer China 'crost the Bay!
