= Tharrawaddy District =

Coordinates: 18°03′N 95°44′E

Tharrawaddy or Thayarwady District (Burmese: သာယာဝတီခရိုင်) is a district of the Bago Division in central Myanmar. The capital lies at Tharrawaddy.

location in Bago region

== Townships ==
The district contains the following townships:

Townships in Thayarwady District Tharrawaddy Township Gyobingauk Township Letpadan Township Minhla Township Monyo Township Okpho Township

1. Tharrawaddy Township
2. Letpadan Township
3. Minhla Township
4. Monyo Township
5. Okpho Township
6. Gyobingauk Township
