= Early Pagan Kingdom =

First-millennium CE city-state in Southeast Asia

Early kingdom of Bagan ခေတ်ဦး ပုဂံ ပြည်
- c. 107 CE–1044
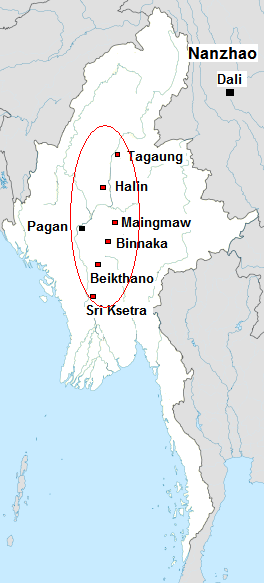
- Capital: Arimaddana, Thiri Pyissaya, Tampawaddy, Pagan (Bagan)
- Common languages: Burmese
- Religion: Buddhism, animism, Hinduism
- Government: Monarchy
  - 107–152 CE (chronicles): Thamoddarit
  - 167–242 (chronicles): Pyusawhti
  - 613–640 (chronicles): Popa Sawrahan
  - 846–886: Pyinbya
  - 956–1001: Nyaung-u Sawrahan
- Historical era: Classical Antiquity
  - Foundation: c. 107 CE
  - ThiriPyissaya founded: 344–387 (chronicles)
  - Tampawaddy founded: 516–523 (chronicles)
  - Burmese calendar launched: 21 March 640 (chronicles)
  - Pagan founded: 23 December 849
  - Disestablished: 16 December 1044
Preceded by	Succeeded by
Pyu city-states	Pagan kingdom

The early Pagan Kingdom (Burmese: ခေတ်ဦး ပုဂံ ပြည်), also known by its classical name Tampa dīpa (တမ္ပဒီပ, lit. "Bronze Country"), was a city-state that existed in the first millennium CE before the emergence of the Pagan Empire in the mid 11th century. The Burmese chronicles state that the "kingdom" was founded in the second century CE. The seat of power of the small kingdom was first located at Arimaddana, Thiri Pyissaya, and Tampawaddy until 849 CE when it was moved to Pagan (Bagan).

Radiocarbon dating shows the earliest human settlement in the Pagan region dates only from the mid-7th century CE. It existed alongside Pyu city-states that dominated Upper Burma. The city-state of Pagan, according to mainstream scholarship, was founded in the mid 9th century by the Mranma of Nanzhao kingdom. Burmans at Pagan expanded irrigation-based cultivation while borrowing extensively from the Pyus' predominantly Buddhist culture. It was one of many competing city-states in the Pyu realm until the late 10th century when the principality began absorbing its surrounding states. The expansion accelerated in the 1050s and 1060s when King Anawrahta founded the Pagan Empire, the first ever unification of the Irrawaddy valley and its periphery.

== Chronicle tradition ==
=== Formation ===
Various Burmese chronicles do not agree on the date of foundation of Pagan. One of the earliest chronicles, Yazawin Kyaw compiled in 1520, states that the kingdom of Pagan was founded in 156 CE by King Pyusawhti. (Note: (Yazawin Kyaw 2010: 139–140): Pagan was founded 700 years after the death of the Buddha.) The 18th century chronicle Maha Yazawin links the Pagan monarchs to the Sri Ksetra kingdom, stating that Pagan was founded in 107 CE by King Thamoddarit, a scion of Sri Ksetra kingdom. The Buddha visited the future site of Pagan during his lifetime and predicted that a great city would arise at the very site 651 years after his death (107 CE). The 19th century chronicle Hmannan Yazawin went further, asserting that the founders of the Pagan dynasty ultimate trace their origins back to the clan of the Buddha.

Still according to the standard chronicles, Thamoddarit fixed the capital at Arimaddana-pura (အရိမဒ္ဒနာပူရ), ("the City that Tramples on Enemies"), near present-day Nyaung U, and named his kingdom Pugarama. His "kingdom" included 19 villages in the region. The 19 villages were: (1) Nyaung U, (2) Naga Soe, (3) Naga Kyit, (4) Magyi Kyi, (5) Htude, (6) Kyauk Zaga, (7) Ohte Thein, (8) Nyaungwun, (9) Anuradha, (10) Dazaungkun, (11) Ywa Mohn, (12) Kyinlo, (13) Kokko, (14) Taungpa, (15) Myegedwin, (16) Thayet Ya, (17) Singu, (18) Yonlut, and (19) Ywa Zaik.

According to Burmese Buddhist tradition, Pagan was known by different classical names even in the ages of previous Buddhas (i.e. before the present era of Gautama Buddha). The names below are Burmese versions of Pali names.

Era	Name	Meaning
Era of Kakusandha Buddha	Pandupalāsh(पाण्डुपलाश)	The withered foliage
Era of Koṇāgamana Buddha	Dharmakuṭī( धर्मकुटी )	House of Righteousness
Era of Kassapa Buddha	Tambadvipa( तांबाद्वीप )	land of the Bronze
Era of Gautama Buddha	Arimardan( अरिमर्दन )	Foe-crusher

Thamoddarit then appointed Pyusawhti, the founder of Pagan according to Yazawin Kyaw, as heir apparent for the commoner's bravery in defeating enemies of the state. Pyusawhti came to power in 167 CE. He ruled for 45 years, implementing foundation institutions of the state, including its first law treatise (dhammathat).

The chronicles continue that King Thili Kyaung I (r. 344–387) moved the palace to Thiri Pyissaya, not far from the Pugama site. In 439, King Thihtan died without leaving an heir, and the throne was contested among three senior ministers at the court. The victor of the power struggle, the minister Thuye ruled until his death in 494. The Pyusawhti line was restored when King Tharamon Phya, a grandson of Thihtan, was put in power by the court. Tharamon Phya's successor Thaik Taing (r. 516–523) moved the palace to Tampawaddy, near Thiri Pyissaya.

The following is the list of Pagan kings as given in the main chronicles.

Name	Reign per Zatadawbon Yazawin	Reign per Maha Yazawin, Yazawin Thit, and Hmannan Yazawin	Relationship with the predecessor
Thamoddarit	80–125	107–152	Nephew of Thupyinnya of Sri Ksetra
Yathekyaung	125–140	152–167	Caretaker
Pyusawhti	140–222	167–242	Son-in-law of Thamoddarit
Hti Min Yin	222–249	242–299	Son
Yin Min Paik	249–334	299–324	Son
Paik Thinli	334–371	324–344	Son
Thili Kyaung I	371–415	344–387	Son
Kyaung Tu Yit	415–440	387–412	Son
Thihtan	440–477	412–439	Son
Thuye	477–492	439–494	Usurper
Tharamon Phya	492–514	494–516	Grandson of Thihtan
Thaik Taing	514–521	516–523	Son
Thinli Kyaung II	521–530	523–532	Son
Thinli Paik	530–535	532–547	Brother
Khan Laung	535–545	547–557	Brother
Khan Lat	545–557	557–569	Brother
Htun Taik	557–570	569–582	Son
Htun Pyit	570–586	582–598	Son
Htun Chit	586–613	598–613	Son

=== Middle Early Pagan ===
The next important king was Popa Sawrahan (r. 613–640). The former monk seized the throne after King Htun Chit died in 613 CE. He launched the Burmese calendar on 21 March 640 CE, with the starting date of 22 March 638. (Note: (Maha Yazawin Vol. 1 2006: 143): The calendar was reset, leaving two years, in year 640 CE. The starting date of the Burmese calendar was 22 March 638; Year 2 of the Burmese calendar began on 21 March 640 per (Eade 1989: 39).) (According to scholarship, the Burmese calendar was actually launched at Sri Ksetra (Pyay/Prome) by the Pyu.) Popa Sawrahan made peace with the royal line by giving his daughter to Shwe Ohnthi, son of Htun Chit and rightful heir, and making his son-in-law the heir apparent. Popa Sawrahan died in 640 soon after his new calendar was launched, and Shwe Ohnthi succeeded, restoring the Pyusawhti line. Shwe Ohnthi was followed by another a dozen kings to year 846 CE. In 846 CE, King Pyinbya (r. 846–886) came to power. Three years into his reign, on 23 December 849, he moved the capital to the present-day site of Pagan.

All four main chronicles are in agreement with the regnal dates in this period.

Name	Reign per Zatadawbon Yazawin, Maha Yazawin, Yazawin Thit, and Hmannan Yazawin	Relationship with the predecessor
Popa Sawrahan	613–640	Usurper
Shwe Ohnthi	640–652	Son-in-law
Peit Thon	652–660	Brother
Peit Taung	660–710	Son
Min Khwe	710–716	Brother
Myingyway	716–726	Usurper
Theinga	726–734	Elected by court; of royal blood
Thein Khun	734–744	Son
Shwe Laung	744–753	Son
Htun Htwin	753–762	Son
Shwe Hmauk	762–785	Son
Htun Lut	785–802	Brother
Saw Khin Hnit	802–829	Son
Khelu	829–846	Son

=== Late Early Pagan ===
After Pyinbya's successor and son Tannet died in 904 CE, the throne passed on to a series of usurpers for nearly a century to 1001 CE. (Note: (Maha Yazawin Vol. 1 2006: 346–349): Dates per Zatadawbon Yazawin, the most accurate chronicle for early Pagan dates.) Nyaung-u Sawrahan (r. 956–1001), the earliest inscriptionally verified king, ruled for 45 years. A descendant of Pyusawhti, Kunhsaw Kyaunghpyu restored the old royal line in 1001 but 20 years later, he was pushed out by the sons of Nyaung-u Sawrahan. In 1044, Anawrahta, son of Kunhsaw Kyaunghpyu, defeated Sokkate, son of Nyaung-u Sawrahan, in single combat and seized the throne.

The chronicles again do not agree with the dates for this period. The dates in later chronicles Yazawin Thit and Hmannan Yazawin now depart from Maha Yazawin dates from 846 CE forward.

Name	Reign per Zatadawbon Yazawin	Reign per Maha Yazawin	Reign per Yazawin Thit and Hmannan Yazawin	Relationship with predecessor(s)
Pyinbya	846–886	846–858	846–878	Brother
Tannet	886–904	858–876	878–906	Son
Sale Ngahkwe	904–934	876–901	906–915	Usurper
Theinhko	934–956	901–917	915–931	Son
Nyaung-u Sawrahan	956–1001	917–950	931–964	Usurper
Kunhsaw Kyaunghpyu	1001–1021	950–971	964–986	Son of Tannet
Kyiso	1021–1038	971–977	986–992	Son of Nyaung-u Sawrahan
Sokkate	1038–1044	977–1002	992–1017	Brother

== Scholarship ==
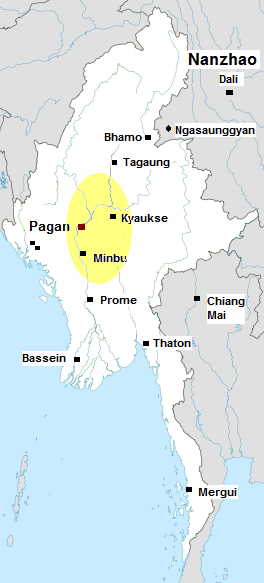
Principality of Pagan at Anawrahta's accession in 1044

=== A settlement in the Pyu realm ===
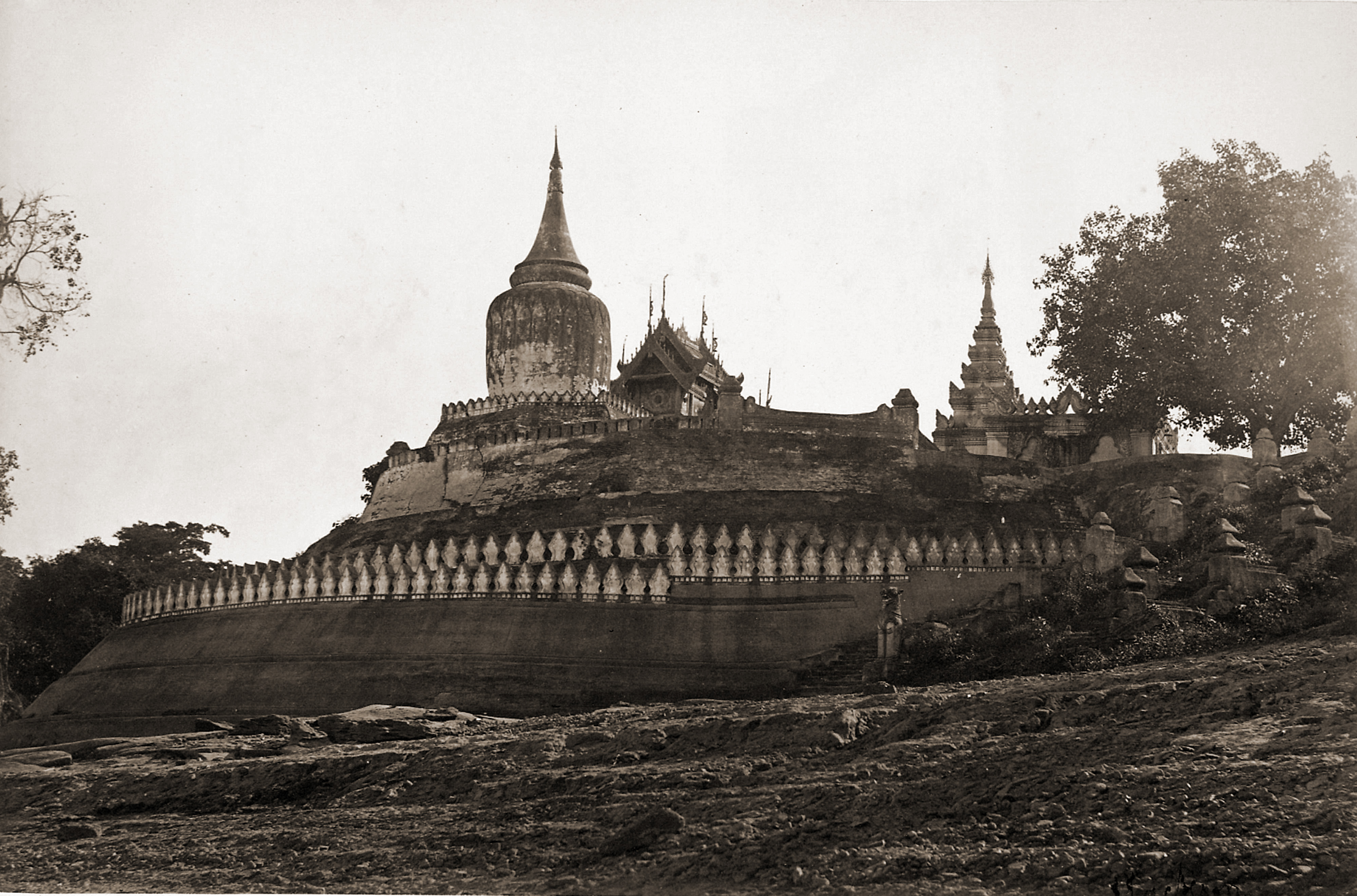
Original Bupaya Pagoda, as seen in 1868, believed to be built by King Pyusawhti

Modern scholarship, however, holds that the Pagan dynasty was founded by the Mranma (Burmans) of the Nanzhao Kingdom in the mid-to-late 9th century CE; that the earlier parts of the chronicle are the histories and legends of the Pyu people, the earliest inhabitants of Burma of whom records are extant; and that Pagan kings had incorporated the Pyu histories and legends as their own.

The earliest human settlement at Pagan is radiocarbon dated to c. 650 CE. But evidence is inconclusive to prove that it was specifically a Burman settlement, not just another Pyu settlement. The 7th century settlement was part of the Pyu realm, which by then had been in existence in the Irrawaddy valley since the 2nd century BCE. (Archaeological evidence shows that as early as the 2nd century BCE, the Pyu had built water-management systems along secondary streams in central and northern parts of the Irrawaddy basin and had founded one of Southeast Asia's earliest urban centres. By the early centuries CE, several walled cities and towns had emerged. The architectural and artistic evidence indicates the Pyu realm's contact with Indian culture by the 4th century CE. The city-states boasted kings and palaces, moats and massive wooden gates, and always 12 gates for each of the signs of the zodiac, one of the many enduring patterns that would continue until the British occupation. Sri Ksetra emerged as the premier Pyu city-state in the 7th century CE. Although the size of the city-states and the scale of political organisation grew during the 7th to early 9th centuries, no sizeable kingdom had yet emerged by the 9th century.)

=== Arrival of the Mranma ===
According to G.H. Luce's reconstruction, the millennium-old Pyu realm came crashing down under repeated attacks by the Nanzhao Kingdom of Yunnan between the 750s and 830s CE. Like that of the Pyu, the original home of Burmans prior to Yunnan is believed to be present-day Qinghai and Gansu provinces. After the Nanzhao attacks had greatly weakened the Pyu city-states, large numbers of Burman warriors and their families first entered the Pyu realm in the 830s and 840s and settled at the confluence of the Irrawaddy and Chindwin rivers, perhaps to help Nanzhao pacify the surrounding countryside. Indeed, the naming system of the early Pagan kings—Pyusawhti and his descendants for six generations—was identical to that of the Nanzhao kings where the last name of the father became the first name of the son.

Despite the legendary nature of both pre-Buddhist and Hmannan's Buddhist-inspired stories, a historical Pyusawhti likely existed. Historians conjecture that the historical Pyusawhti was likely a minor chief of the Nanzhao Kingdom, who was in the vanguard of the Nanzhao invasions of the upper Irrawaddy valley that began in 754 (and lasted until the 830s). Pyusawhti's victory over the Chinese likely refers to the Nanzhao victory over the Chinese in the same era, in which Pyusawhti and his contingents may have participated.

The Pagan "kingdom" Pyusawhti led was likely a small settlement among many other small settlements in the area. (The chronicles count 19 settlements.) In the 8th century, Pagan was not yet a city or even a city-state, let alone a "kingdom". The city was merely one of several competing city-states until the 10th century. Furthermore, the 38 kings of Pagan Dynasty—from Pyusawhti to Sokkate, prior to the historically verified king Anawrahta—were probably contemporary chiefs of the Pagan area's settlements. According to the British colonial era historian GE Harvey, the Burmese chroniclers likely arranged the lists of rulers of early Burmese polities consecutively, "wishing to portray a continuous lineage stretching back to divine antiquity."

However, some scholars believe that Burmans had arrived in Myanmar much earlier than the mainstream opinion holds. Htin Aung contends that the arrival of Burmans may have been a few centuries earlier, perhaps the early 7th century. (Note: (Htin Aung 1967: 367): "Emergence of the Burmese" c. 600 CE. (Htin Aung 1970: 11–15): The chapter titled "The Coming of the Burmese" picks apart Luce's 9th century Nanzhao theory, and seems to indicate an even earlier arrival date than the 600 CE date he proposed in (Htin Aung 1967).) Historians Michael Aung-Thwin and Matrii Aung-Thwin write that the 19 villages that first formed the city of Pagan according to the chronicles are "probably" "legendary" but "the origins of the Burmese speakers in Myanmar may well be earlier than, and had nothing to do with, the Nanzhao raid of AD 832".

Thant Myint-U summarises the mainstream opinion that "the Nanzhao Empire had washed up on the banks of the Irrawaddy, and would find a new life, fused with an existing and ancient culture, to produce one of the most impressive little kingdoms of the medieval world. From this fusion would result the Burmese people, and the foundations of modern Burmese culture."

=== Rise of Pagan ===
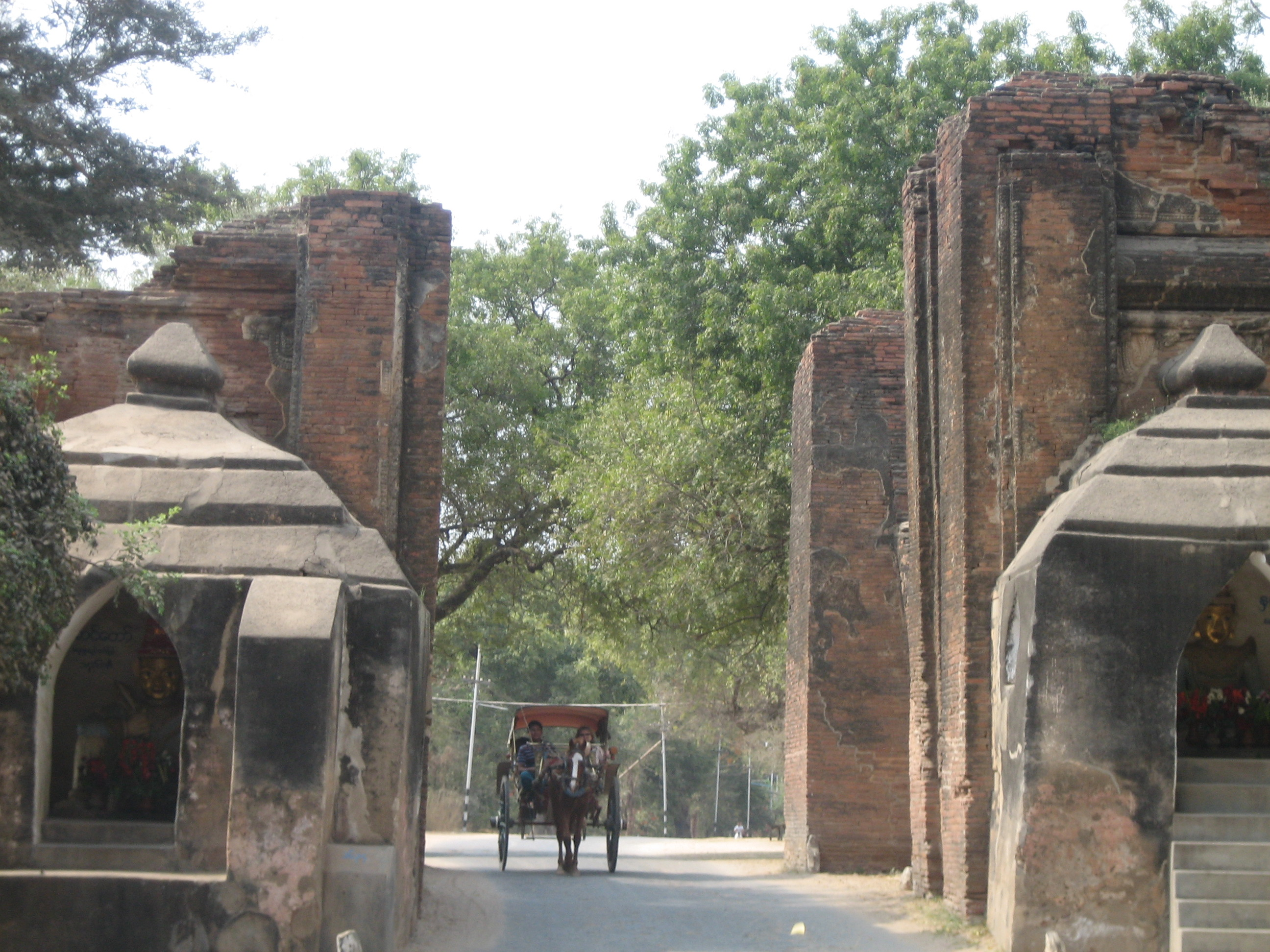
The Tharabha Gate at Pagan (Bagan), the only remaining section of the old walls. The main walls are dated to c. 1020 CE and the earliest pieces of the walls to c. 980 CE.

Evidence shows that the actual pace of Burman migration into the Pyu realm was gradual. Indeed, no firm indications have been found at Sri Ksetra or at any other Pyu site to suggest a violent overthrow. Radiocarbon dating shows that human activity existed until c. 870 at Halin, the Pyu city reportedly destroyed by an 832 Nanzhao raid. The region of Pagan received waves of Burman settlements in the mid-to-late 9th century, and perhaps well into the 10th century. By the mid-10th century, Burmans at Pagan had expanded irrigation-based cultivation while borrowing extensively from the Pyus' predominantly Buddhist culture. Pagan's early iconography, architecture and scripts suggest little difference between early Burman and Pyu cultural forms. Moreover, no sharp ethnic distinction between Burmans and linguistically linked Pyus seems to have existed.

Starting in the late 10th century, the principality grew in authority and grandeur. The earliest mention of Pagan in external sources occurs in Song Chinese records, which report that envoys from Pagan visited the Song capital Bianjing in 1004. The city by now was fortified. Radiocarbon dating of Pagan's walls show that Pagan was fortified most probably c. 1020 CE. The Burmese script was already in use by 1035, and perhaps as early as 984 CE. (Note: (Aung-Thwin 2005: 167–178, 197–200): The earliest Burmese script (the copper-gilt umbrella inscription of the Mahabodhi Temple) is dated to 1035. If a recast 18th century copy of an original stone inscription is permissible as evidence, the Burmese script had already been in use at least since 984 CE.) By Anawrahta's accession in 1044, Pagan had grown into a small principality—about 320 km (200 miles) north to south and about 130 km (80 miles) from east to west, comprising roughly the present districts of Mandalay, Meiktila, Myingyan, Kyaukse, Yamethin, Magwe, Sagaing, and the riverine portions of Minbu and Pakkoku. To the north lay the Nanzhao Kingdom, and to the east still largely uninhibited Shan Hills, to the south and the west Pyus, and farther south still, Mons.

== See also ==
- Pagan kings family tree
- Pagan Kingdom
- Pyu city-states
- Sri Ksetra Kingdom
- Tagaung Kingdom

== See also ==
- Tagaung Kingdom
- Sri Ksetra Kingdom
- Pagan Kingdom

== Bibliography ==
- Aung-Thwin, Michael A. (2005). The Mists of Rāmañña: The Legend that was Lower Burma (illustrated ed.). Honolulu: University of Hawai'i Press. ISBN 9780824828868.
- Aung-Thwin, Michael A.; Maitrii Aung-Thwin (2012). A History of Myanmar Since Ancient Times (illustrated ed.). Honolulu: University of Hawai'i Press. ISBN 978-1-86189-901-9.
- Eade, J.C. (1989). Southeast Asian Ephemeris: Solar and Planetary Positions, A.D. 638–2000. Ithaca: Cornell University. ISBN 0-87727-704-4.
- Hall, D.G.E. (1960). Burma (3rd ed.). Hutchinson University Library. ISBN 978-1-4067-3503-1.
- Harvey, G. E. (1925). History of Burma: From the Earliest Times to 10 March 1824. London: Frank Cass & Co. Ltd.
- Htin Aung, Maung (1967). A History of Burma. New York and London: Cambridge University Press.
- Htin Aung, Maung (1970). Burmese History before 1287: A Defence of the Chronicles. Oxford: The Asoka Society.
- Kala, U (1724). Maha Yazawin Gyi (in Burmese). Vol. 1–3 (2006, 4th printing ed.). Yangon: Ya-Pyei Publishing.
- Lieberman, Victor B. (2003). Strange Parallels: Southeast Asia in Global Context, c. 800–1830, volume 1, Integration on the Mainland. Cambridge University Press. ISBN 978-0-521-80496-7.
- Maha Thilawuntha, Shin (1928). Pe Maung Tin (ed.). Yazawin Kyaw (in Burmese) (4th printing, 2010 ed.). Yangon: Burma Research Society (original publisher), Ya-Pyei (4th printing).
- Moore, Elizabeth H. (2007). Early Landscapes of Myanmar. Bangkok: River Books. ISBN 978-974-9863312.
- Myint-U, Thant (2006). The River of Lost Footsteps—Histories of Burma. Farrar, Straus and Giroux. ISBN 978-0-374-16342-6.
- Royal Historical Commission of Burma (1832). Hmannan Yazawin (in Burmese). Vol. 1–3 (2003 ed.). Yangon: Ministry of Information, Myanmar.
- Than Tun (1964). Studies in Burmese History (in Burmese). Vol. 1. Yangon: Maha Dagon.
