= Heat waves in Myanmar =

Extreme weather in Myanmar

- Location: Central Dry Zone, Myanmar

Heat wave / Extreme Heat
- Daily peak temperatures-minute sustained

Overall effects
- Fatalities: 30+ confirmed (2019); additional reports in 2024–2026
- Areas affected: Central and Southern Myanmar

Heat waves in Myanmar with significant impacts are increasingly becoming a disaster risk. As a Tropical country heavily exposed to the impacts of climate change. Since 2019, there has been an increased incidence of fatal heatwaves that have direct impact on the public health and socio-economic conditions of the country.

== Environmental context ==
Myanmar is consistently ranked as one of the nations most vulnerable to the effects of global climate change. The country's Dry Zone (Anyar) frequently experiences extended dry spells and high temperatures during Myanmar's summer months (February to May). In recent decades, Myanmar has observed a mean temperature rise of 0.82°C, with projections suggesting further increases of up to 2.07°C by 2060 due to anthropogenic factors.

During the extreme 2024 and 2026 heatwaves, temperatures in several Myanmar townships in Magway Region reached record-breaking levels. The heat was exacerbated by El Niño effects. These areas dominate global daily heat rankings and posed severe risks to public health and regional security.

== Historical Heatwaves ==
=== 2019 ===
A major heatwave in 2019 led to 149 reported cases of heatstroke and 30 confirmed fatalities across nine regions, including Bago and Yangon. Data from the Ministry of Health indicated that the majority of victims were men, particularly those engaged in outdoor labor or individuals with pre-existing cardiovascular conditions.

=== 2024 ===
In April 2024, Myanmar experienced an unprecedented heatwave described as the most severe since meteorological records began 56 years prior. On April 28, 2024, the town of Chauk in the Magway Region recorded a peak temperature of 48.2°C (118.8°F), marking the highest April temperature ever officially recorded in Myanmar. Mandalay reached 44°C and Yangon reached 40°C. Men in their 40s were most affected. One man with pre-existing heart problems died while cycling. Water shortages caused by the civil war also exacerbated problems in Sagaing Region.

=== 2026 ===
The 2026 heatwave saw Myanmar townships occupying a significant portion of the world's top 15 hottest spots simultaneously. In late March and early April, Minbu emerged as a global hotspot, reaching a peak of 43.2°C on April 2. By April 3, the town of Chauk recorded 44.0°C, followed closely by Monywa at 43.8°C and Magway at 43.5°C. Other affected areas included Taungoo, Bago, and Pyay, all of which maintained temperatures well above the seasonal average for several consecutive days.

The public health crisis was exacerbated by a national fuel shortage. People waiting in long queues at petrol stations under direct sunlight for extended periods led to multiple reports of heat exhaustion and fatalities in urban centers. Heat-relief camps were established in the most affected townships, such as Minbu Township. Monastic halls and schools were designated as heat-relief camps, acting as a space providing cooling areas and hydration for residents during peak afternoon hours to prevent heat-related medical emergencies.

== See also ==
- Climate of Myanmar
- Dry Zone (Myanmar)
