= List of capitals of Myanmar =

The current capital of Myanmar (Burma) is Naypyidaw. The following is a list of political capitals of notable states in Burmese history from the 9th century to the present. The list is generally organised in dynastic and chronological orders. National capitals are shown in bold.

== List of capitals ==
| State | Capital | Period | Duration | Notes |
|---|---|---|---|---|
| Pagan Kingdom | **Pagan (Bagan)** | 23 December 849 – 17 December 1297 | 447 years, 359 days | (Note: The date of fortification (6th waxing of Pyatho 211 ME) per Zatadawbon Yazawin (Zata 1960: 41) given as the date of foundation. Zata (Zata 1960: 53) says the city of Arimaddana was founded in 190 CE (Sunday, 15th waxing [sic] of Tagu 112 Pyu Era (Saka Era)) while the palace was moved to Thiri Pyissaya in 390 CE (Thursday, 1st waxing of Pyatho 312 Pyu Era). Hmannan Yazawin (Hmannan Vol. 1 2003: 185–188) gives 107 CE as the date of foundation of Pagan. According to scholarship, Pagan was founded in the mid-to-late 9th century, and fortified in the late 10th century at the earliest. (Aung-Thwin 2005: 185): radiocarbon dating shows the earliest human settlement in Pagan dates only to c. 650 CE. (Aung-Thwin 2005: 38): radiocarbon dating of Pagan's surviving walls yields dates no earlier than 980 CE, with more likely dates c. 1020 CE. It means the Pyu Era dates claimed by Zata may have been Burmese Era dates. If true, Pagan may have been founded on Sunday, 14 March 751 (Sunday, 14th (not 15th) waxing of Late Tagu 112 ME), and the palace was moved to Thiri Pyissaya on Thursday, 12 December 950 (Thursday, 1st waxing of Pyatho 312 ME). (Than Tun 1959: 119–120): King Kyawswa was dethroned on 17 December 1297 (13th waxing of Pyatho 659 ME) according to inscriptional evidence. The Chinese records show that the dethronement occurred in June–July 1298.) |
| Myinsaing Kingdom | Myinsaing, Mekkhaya and Pinle | 17 December 1297 – 13 April 1310 | 12 years, 117 days | (Note: (Hmannan Vol. 1 2003: 369) states that King Yazathingyan, ruler of Mekkhaya, died after having reigned for five years. But (Than Tun 1959: 123) quotes an inscription which says two brothers Yazathingyan and Thihathu were still alive after the eldest brother Athinhkaya had died on 13 April 1310.) |
| Myinsaing Kingdom | Pinle | 13 April 1310 – 7 February 1313 | 2 years, 300 days | |
| Pinya Kingdom | Pinya | 7 February 1313 – 26 February 1365 | 52 years, 19 days | (Note: (Hmannan Vol. 1 2003: 370) gives Wednesday, 15th waxing [sic] of Tabaung 674 ME, which translates to Saturday, 10 February 1313. But 15th waxing is most probably a copying error since it is highly uncommon to say 15th waxing instead of full moon. The date was probably 12th waxing of Tabaung, which correctly translates to Wednesday, 7 February 1313. Burmese numerals 2 (၂) and 5 (၅) are similar and can easily be miscopied.) |
| Sagaing Kingdom | Sagaing | 15 May 1315 – 26 February 1365 | 49 years, 287 days | (Note: (Hmannan Vol. 1 2003: 375): Saw Yun began his reign at Sagaing on 12th waxing of Nayon 677 ME (15 May 1315).) |
| Ava Kingdom | Ava (Inwa) | 26 February 1365 – 22 January 1555 | 189 years, 330 days | (Note: Ava fell to Toungoo forces on 22 January 1555 (Tuesday, 2nd waxing of Tabaung 916 ME) per (Maha Yazawin Vol. 2 2006: 221). Ava had two prior dynastic changes both wrought by the men from Mohnyin. The founding Thado Minbya dynasty (သတိုးဆက်) fell on 16 May 1426 (Thursday, 10th waxing of Nayon 788 ME) to forces led by Mohnyin Thado per (Yazawin Thit Vol. 1 2012: 271–272). The Mohnyin dynasty (မိုးညှင်းဆက်) in turn fell to the forces of the Confederation of Shan States led by Sawlon on 14 March 1527 (12th waxing of Late Tagu 888 ME) per (Maha Yazawin Vol. 2 2006: 113).) |
| Prome Kingdom | Prome (Pyay) | c. November 1482 – 19 May 1542 | 59 years, 6+ months | |
| Hanthawaddy kingdom | Martaban (Mottama) | 30 January 1287 – c. February 1364 | ~77 years | (Note: Wareru's accession date per scholarship (Yazawin Thit Vol. 1 2012: 148, footnote 8): Thursday, Full moon of Tabodwe 648 ME = 30 January 1287. As for the move to Donwun, (Pan Hla 2005: 57–59) gives 725 ME (1363/64). (Pan Hla 2005: 48) says that King Binnya U learned of the coup at the Martaban palace four months into his hunting trip. Since the trip most probably began after the end of the Buddhist Lent on 22 September 1363 (full moon of Thadingyut 725 ME), the earliest he learned of the rebellion would be around January 1364. If he began the trip only after the rainy season was over, c. November 1363, he might have learned of the rebellion only in March 1364.) |
| Hanthawaddy kingdom | Donwun | by 29 March 1364 – 1369 | 5+ years | (Note: (Phayre 1967: 66) says King Saw Zein moved his capital to Pegu soon after he came to power in Thadingyut 685 ME (31 August 1323 to 28 September 1323). (Pan Hla 2004: 39–41) only states Saw Zein first had to reacquire Pegu but does not mention a move. According to Pan Hla, Saw Zein' successor ascended the throne at Martaban in 1330.) |
| Hanthawaddy kingdom | Pegu (Bago) | 1369 – c. November 1538 | 169+ years | (Note: Chronicles give only 900 ME (30 March 1538 to 29 March 1539) as the date when Pegu fell to Toungoo forces. (Harvey 1925: 368) translates that to year 1539. (Harvey 1925) generally adds 639 when translating from the Burmese calendar to the Western calendar for Ava and early Toungoo periods, which is highly inaccurate. (The Burmese calendar straddles the Western year. In the 16th century, a little over 75% of the Burmese year fell on the Western year arrived at by adding 638. The book does revert to adding 638 in later periods.) Nonetheless many history books on Burma follow (Harvey 1925)'s dates. (Than Tun's books are an exception.) The date Pegu fell is almost always given as 1539 in Western history books although the actual chronicle text clearly indicates that Pegu fell early in the dry season of 1538–1539 (probably c. November/December 1538), and plenty of fighting ensued after Pegu's fall.) |
| Hanthawaddy kingdom | Pegu | late June 1550 – 12 March 1552 | 1 year, 8+ months | (Note: (Maha Yazawin Vol. 2 2006: 197): Smim Sawhtut took over Pegu a little over a month and a half after Tabinshwehti's assassination on 30 April 1550. Per the Shwezigon Pagoda Bell Inscription (Maha Yazawin Vol. 2 2006: 339), Bayinnaung took Pegu on 12 March 1552 (Saturday, 3rd waning of Late Tagu 913 ME).) |
| Mrauk-U Kingdom | Launggyet | 18 April 1429 – 16 November 1430 | 1 year, 212 days | (Note: Rakhine Razawin Thit (Sandamala Linkara Vol. 2 1999: 11) says Min Saw Mon took Launggyet on Thursday, 1st waning of Kason 791, which translates to Monday, 18 April 1429.) |
| Mrauk-U Kingdom | Mrauk-U | 16 November 1430 – 2 January 1785 | 354 years, 47 days | (Note: The founding date of Mrauk-U appears differently in different sources. The Burmese encyclopedia (Myanma Swezon Kyan Vol. 9 1964: 425) gives the date as Sunday, 1st waxing of Natdaw 792 ME (16 November 1430). But (Harvey 1925: 139) gives 1433, and (Sandamala Linkara Vol. 2 1999: 13) gives Sunday, 1st waxing of Tawthalin 792 ME (20 August 1430).) |
| Toungoo dynasty | Toungoo (Taungoo) | 16 October 1510 – 1539 | 28–29 years | (Note: (Hmannan Vol. 2 2003: 179): Mingyi Nyo declared independence from Ava on Tuesday, Full moon of Tazaungmon 872 ME, which translates to Wednesday, 16 October 1510. (Hmannan Vol. 2 2003: 196): Tabinshwehti moved his capital to Pegu in 901 ME (30 March 1539 to 29 March 1540).) |
| Toungoo dynasty | **Pegu** | 1539 – 30 April 1550 | ~11 years | |
| Toungoo dynasty | Toungoo | 11 January 1551 – 12 March 1552 | 1 year, 61 days | (Note: (Maha Yazawin 2006: 201): Bayinnaung took Toungoo on 11 January 1551 (Sunday, 5th waxing of Tabodwe 912 ME). (Maha Yazawin Vol. 2 2006: 339): He took Pegu, and moved his capital on 12 March 1552 (Saturday, 3rd waning of Late Tagu 913 ME).) |
| Toungoo dynasty | **Pegu** | 12 March 1552 – 19 December 1599 | 47 years, 282 days | |
| Toungoo dynasty | **Ava** | 19 December 1599 – 14 May 1613 | 13 years, 146 days | (Note: (Hmannan Vol. 3 2003: 172–173): The Burmese chronicles do not state that King Anaukpetlun officially moved the capital to Pegu. But Anaukpetlun arrived at Pegu in early May 1613 as part of his war operations and hosted the first function at his temporary palace on 14 May 1613 (10th waning of Kason 975). He did not go back to Ava afterwards.) |
| Toungoo dynasty | **Pegu** | 14 May 1613 – 25 January 1635 | 21 years, 256 days | |
| Toungoo dynasty | **Ava** | 25 January 1635 – 23 March 1752 | 117 years, 58 days | |
| Restored Hanthawaddy Kingdom | Pegu | November 1740 – 6 May 1757 | 16 years, 6 months | |
| Konbaung dynasty | **Shwebo** | 29 February 1752 – 26 July 1760 | 8 years, 148 days | |
| Konbaung dynasty | **Sagaing** | 26 July 1760 – 23 July 1765 | 4 years, 362 days | |
| Konbaung dynasty | **Ava** | 23 July 1765 – 13 May 1783 | 17 years, 294 days | |
| Konbaung dynasty | **Amarapura** | 13 May 1783 – 22 November 1821 | 38 years, 193 days | |
| Konbaung dynasty | **Ava** | 22 November 1821 – 10 February 1842 | 20 years, 80 days | |
| Konbaung dynasty | **Amarapura** | 10 February 1842 – 23 May 1859 | 17 years, 102 days | |
| Konbaung dynasty | **Mandalay** | 23 May 1859 – 29 November 1885 | 26 years, 190 days | |
| British Burma | Mawlamyine (Moulmein) and Sittwe (Akyab) | 24 February 1826 – 20 December 1852 | 35 years, 341 days | (Note: Mawlamyaing/Moulmein was the capital of the Tenesserim Division while Sittwe/Akyab was that of the Arakan Division of British India. The start date is counted from the date of signing of the Treaty of Yandabo. Arakan, Tenasserim and Pegu were united as British Burma within British India on 31 January 1862.) |
| British Burma | Mawlamyine; Sittwe; Yangon (Rangoon) | 20 December 1852 – 31 January 1862 | 9 years, 42 days | (Note: Yangon/Rangoon became the capital of Pegu Division after the Second Anglo-Burmese War.) |
| British Burma | **Yangon** | 31 January 1862 – 7 March 1942 | 80 years, 35 days | (Note: Yangon became the capital of the Province of Burma of British India on 31 January 1862.) |
| British Burma | **Yangon** | 3 May 1945 – 4 January 1948 | 2 years, 246 days | |
| Japanese Burma | **Yangon** | 7 March 1942 – 3 May 1945 | 3 years, 57 days | |
| Myanmar | **Yangon** | 4 January 1948 – 6 November 2005 | 57 years, 306 days | |
| Myanmar | **Nay Pyi Taw** | 6 November 2005 – present | 20 years, 11 months and 5 days | |

== Bibliography ==
- Myat Soe, ed. (1964). Myanma Swezon Kyan (in Burmese). Vol. 9 (1 ed.). Yangon: Sarpay Beikman.
- Aung-Thwin, Michael (2005). The mists of Rāmañña: The Legend that was Lower Burma (illustrated ed.). Honolulu: University of Hawai'i Press. ISBN 9780824828868.
- Harvey, G. E. (1925). History of Burma: From the Earliest Times to 10 March 1824. London: Frank Cass & Co. Ltd.
- Htin Aung, Maung (1967). A History of Burma. New York and London: Cambridge University Press.
- Kala, U (1724). Maha Yazawin (in Burmese). Vol. 1–3 (2006, 4th printing ed.). Yangon: Ya-Pyei Publishing.
- Maung Maung Tin, U (1905). Konbaung Set Yazawin (in Burmese). Vol. 1–3 (2004 ed.). Yangon: Department of Universities History Research, University of Yangon.
- Pan Hla, Nai (1968). Razadarit Ayedawbon (in Burmese) (8th printing, 2004 ed.). Yangon: Armanthit Sarpay.
- Phayre, Lt. Gen. Sir Arthur P. (1883). History of Burma (1967 ed.). London: Susil Gupta.
- Royal Historians of Burma (c. 1680). U Hla Tin (Hla Thamein) (ed.). Zatadawbon Yazawin (1960 ed.). Historical Research Directorate of the Union of Burma.
- Royal Historical Commission of Burma (1832). Hmannan Yazawin (in Burmese). Vol. 1–3 (2003 ed.). Yangon: Ministry of Information, Myanmar.
- Sandamala Linkara, Ashin (1931). Rakhine Razawin Thit (in Burmese). Vol. 1–2 (1997–1999 ed.). Yangon: Tetlan Sarpay.
- Than Tun (December 1959). "History of Burma: A.D. 1300–1400". Journal of Burma Research Society. XLII (II).
- Thaw Kaung, U (2010). Aspects of Myanmar History and Culture. Yangon: Gangaw Myaing Sarpay.
