= Taung U Village =

Taung U Taung U Village
- Location
- Coordinates: 20°48′33″N 95°28′47″E
- Country: Myanmar
- Division: Mandalay
- District: Nyaung-U District
- Township: Kyaukpadaung Township
- Village: Taung U
- Time zone: UTC+6.30 (Myanmar Standard Time)

Taung U Mandalay Region၊ Kyaukpadaung Township၊ Near Yangon-Mandalay Expressway. Taung U is the middle of Kyaukpadaung and Meiktila.

== Biography ==
The old-fashioned Taung U (Faung Oo) was noted as an ancient name for the ancient Burmese kings. Ba Gyi Phe Lake is on the top of the village. Taungoo village has a five-day market. North Side of Taung Oo village is the birthplace of Aung Min Khaung, the birthplace of Aung Min Khaung is Sin Myint Village.

== Education ==
Taung U has a Basic Education High School

== Social ==
Muditar Philanthropy Damma School

== Business ==
Depending on the market, you can trade and trade. The main products of the village are sesame, pulses, rice, plums, and maize.

== Communication ==
Located next to Meiktila Road. Transportation is good. There are cars to Mandalay, Meiktila, Myingyan, Nyaung Oo, Taunggyi and Loikaw.

== Nearby villages ==
|Yay Ngan in the East, |Lat Pan Pyar in the West, |Te Kone, Kan Ywar in the south, |Tha Pyay Kine, Sin Myint in the north
