= Yenangyaung =

Yenangyaung ရေနံချောင်း Yenanchaung
- City
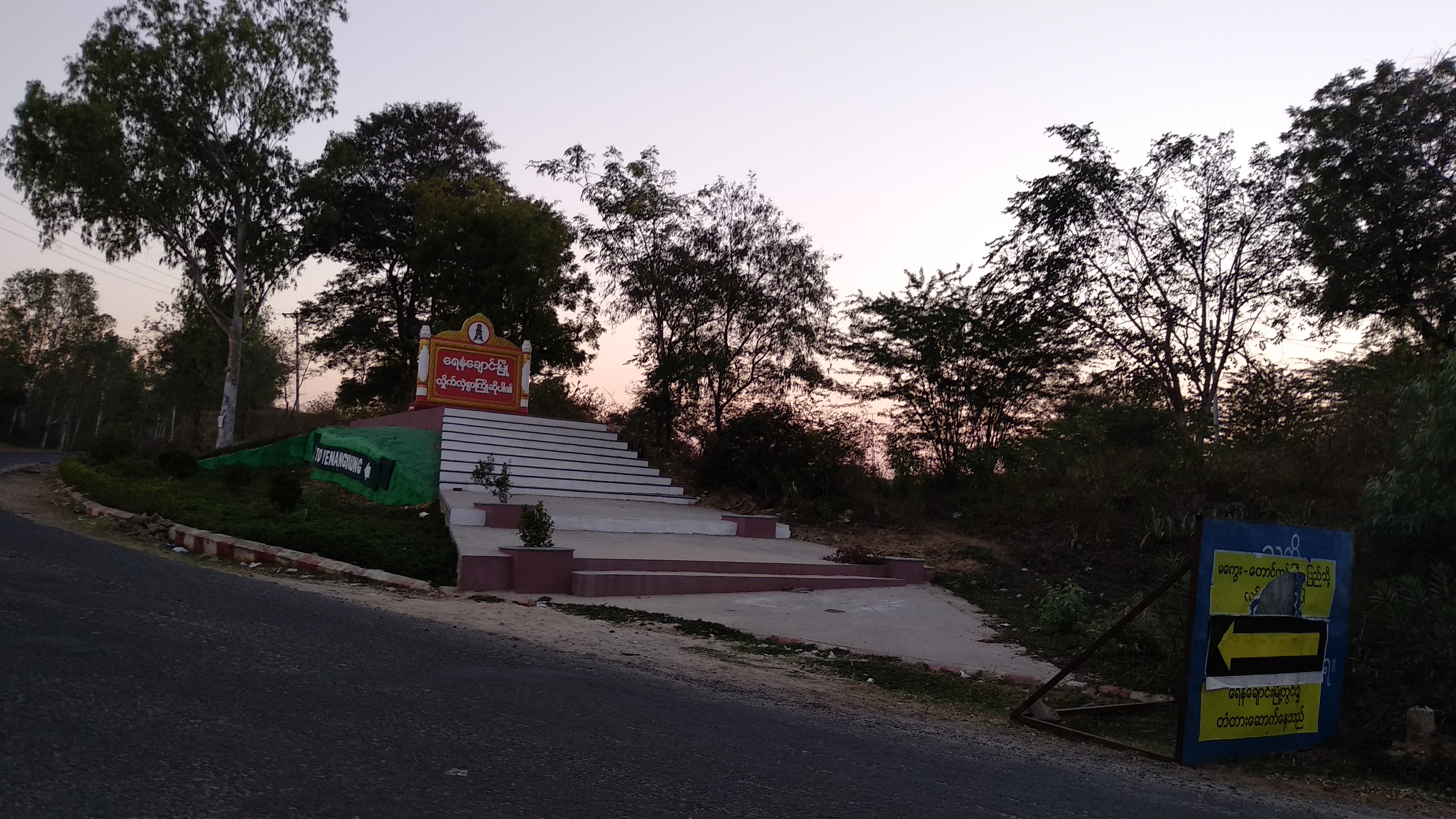
- The welcome board in Yenangyaung

- Location within Myanmar
- Coordinates: 20°27′35″N 94°52′27″E
- Country: Myanmar
- Division: Magway Region
- District: Chauk District
- Township: Yenangyaung Township

Area
  - City: 1,007.4 km^{2} (388.95 sq mi)
- Elevation: 200 m (650 ft)

Population
  - Density: 2,000/km^{2} (5,200/sq mi)
  - Urban: 54,535 (March 2,023) 48,659 (September 2,018) 49,588 (September 2,019) 49,938 (September 2,020)
- Time zone: UTC+6:30 (MMT)

Yenangyaung (Burmese: ရေနံချောင်း; literally "stream of oil") is a city in the Magway Region of central Myanmar, located on the Irrawaddy River and 135 miles from Mandalay.

Until 1974, it remained the capital city of both Minbu Division (now Magway Division) and Yenangyaung District. The population of Yenanchaung was 45,120 according to the 2014 census, but it reached 49,938 in September 2020. This makes it the fourth-largest city in the Magway Region, after Pakokku, Magway and Aunglan. General Aung San received his secondary education in this city.

== History ==
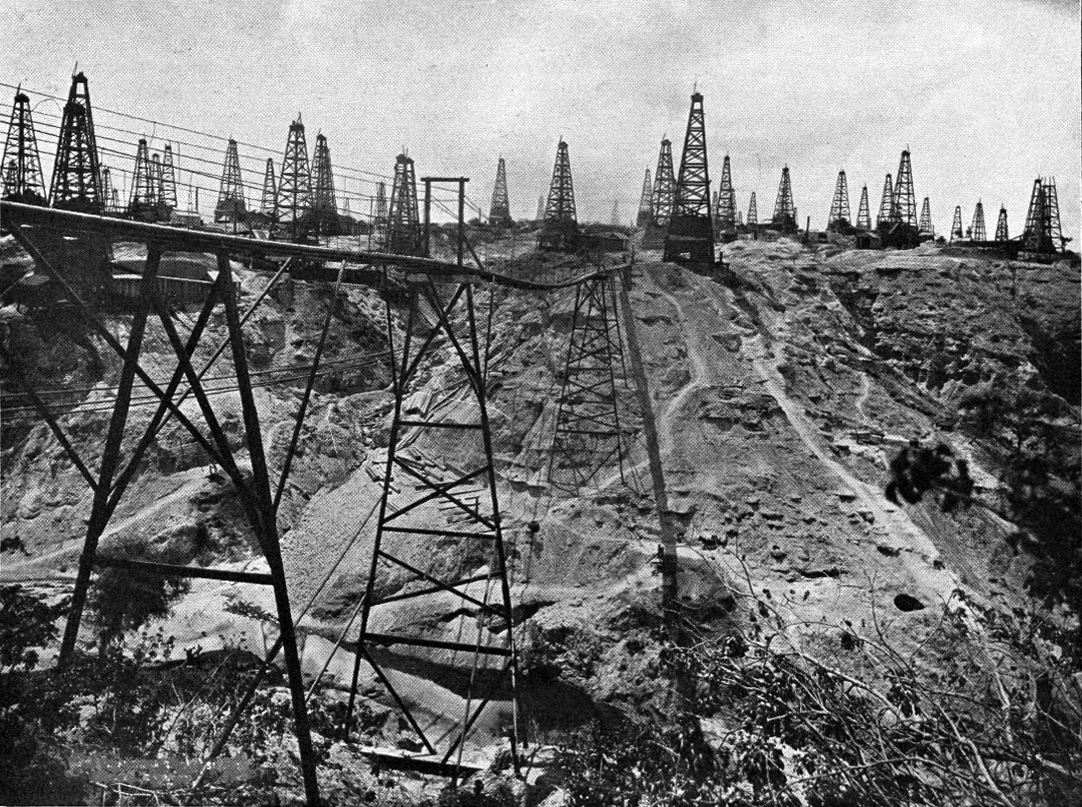
Oil wells in Yenangyaung during the early 20th century.

=== Origins of the petroleum industry ===
For centuries, petroleum has been the dominant industry in the area. It began as an indigenous industry, with hand-dug wells. From 1755 onward, British soldier-diplomats noted its existence. In 1795, Major Michael Symes described the indigenous industry as 'the celebrated wells of Petroleum'. The following year, when Captain Hiram Cox, the East India Company Resident in Rangoon, visited Yenangyaung, he found '520 wells registered by government'.

The oil fields at Twingon and Beme, close to Yenangyaung, were in the hands of a hereditary corporation of 24 families, each headed by a twinzayo (တွင်းစားရိုး). In turn, these yo-ya families were headed by 8 men and 6 women twinzayos. Inheritance descended from male to male and from female to female. The word twinzayo is derived from twin ('well'), za ('eater' or one who derives income from property) and yo (which represents the hereditary lineal bloodline).

The twinzayo could arrange for wells to be dug on their behalf, or allocate well sites to others. In pre-colonial times, these individual well owners, known as twinza, were usually relatives of the twinzayo and paid a monthly rental for their site. The twingyimin, the elected head of the twinzayo corporation, controlled the fields, and though a twinzayo could choose the site of a well, digging could not commence until site was approval by the twingyimin. During British colonial rule, the hereditary rights of the twinzayo were recognized in the Executive Instructions of 1893.

The industry's origins remain uncertain, with some claiming that it began as early as 10th century AD. However, the earliest extant records date to 1755, attributed to an English captain, George Baker, who wrote of an 'earth oil town' of 200 families by the Irrawaddy River. In pre-colonial times, wells were dug by hand. Some records estimated that upwards of 1,000,000 US gallons (3,800,000 L) per day of oil were produced in 1797.

=== World War II ===
During World War II, Yenangyaung was the location of a strategically important oil refinery. As a result of the speed and success of the Japanese' advance through Burma during the Burma Campaign and the Battle of Yenangyaung, the retreating Allied forces were forced to blow up the oil fields and the refinery to prevent them from falling to the Japanese. This difficult task was undertaken by a small group of men who had experience with explosives and demolitions, some previously serving with the Bombay Pioneers (part of the British Indian Army) in World War I. The oil facilities were destroyed on 16 April 1942.

This group included Lt. Col. Arthur Herbert Virgin OBE, formerly of the 2nd Bombay Pioneers, who at that time would have been a Captain or Major in the 20th Burma Rifles, which later formed part of the Fourteenth Army under Field Marshal Sir William Slim. He and the rest of the men had to escape through the enemy-held territory to Imphal and Kohima in India, a distance of nearly 1,000 miles. This included swimming across the Irrawaddy River, as the only bridge had been blown up to delay the Japanese.

The Japanese were able to continue using the oilfields, but in the last year of the war as the Allies advanced eastward toward Burma, the oil fields were badly damaged by Allied bombers. The first to strike were USAAF North American B-25 Mitchell bombers, followed moments later by British Hawker Hurricane fighters, with long-range tanks, bombs, and 20 mm cannon.

=== Administrative and governmental changes ===
Yenangyaung was the capital city of the Minbu Division. Minbu Region was established with 3 districts: Minbu District, Thayet District, and Yenangyaung District.

On March 2, 1962, the military-led by General Ne Win took control of Burma through a coup d'état, and the government had been under direct or indirect control by the military for some time. A new constitution of the Socialist Republic of the Union of Burma was adopted in 1974.

By 1974, the name of the Minbu region was changed to Magway Region, and Yenangyaung District was abolished. Magway District was established with 6 townships. The capital city was changed to Magway from Yenangyaung.

After Rangoon, Yenangyaung was the second largest and developing city of Lower Burma until 1980. The city was more prominent than Upper Burma's largest city, Mandalay. Nowadays, the city is less developed and considered a small city in Myanmar, Magway District.

== Geography ==
Yenangyaung is located along the Irrawaddy River, and is divided into 14 main quarters, namely:

- Thit-ta Bwe
- Ywarthit
- Obo
- Nyaung Hla
- Myoma (South)
- Myoma (North)
- Sonetite
- Shwe Kyar-nyone
- Myaynikhin (South)
- Myaynikhin (North)
- Bo Gone
- Thahtay Gone
- Twin Gone
- Baymae

Sub-quarters include Shwe-bone Thar, Ngwe-bone Thar, Yenanthar, Ayesayti, and Aungchan Thar.

Myoma Market and Yadanar Market are located in the center of the city, while the Industry Zone is located in the city's north.

== Economy ==
Yenangyuang is surrounded by oil fields that were long the most productive in the country.

The principal product of Yenangyuang is petroleum. The area produces most of the oil and natural gas in Myanmar. Yenangyaung also produces cooking oil. Agriculture is another essential component of the economy, with the major crops being sesame, groundnut, onion, sunflower, and beans.

== Education ==
Yenangyaung is home to Yenangyaung University and Yenangyaung Government Technical Institute, as well as No.(1) Basic Education High School, which turned 100 years old in January 2015.

== Notable people ==
- Aung San, the future leader most responsible for Burmese independence, went to high school here. He attended the Yenanchaung Anglo-Vernacular National High School.
- Khin Kyaw Han (born 1953), a former Member of Parliament for the National League for Democracy (NLD).

== See also ==
- Battle of Yenangyaung
- Petroleum seep
