= Khin Kyaw Han =

Burmese politician

Khin Kyaw Han (born 23 February 1953, in Yenangyaung) is a former Burmese politician. In 1990, he was elected in Yenangyaung Township as a Member of Parliament for the National League for Democracy (NLD). A former political prisoner, he fled to Thailand after his 2003 release. Han authored the book 1990 Multi-Party Democracy General Elections.
