= Natmauk =

Natmauk နတ်မောက်
- Town
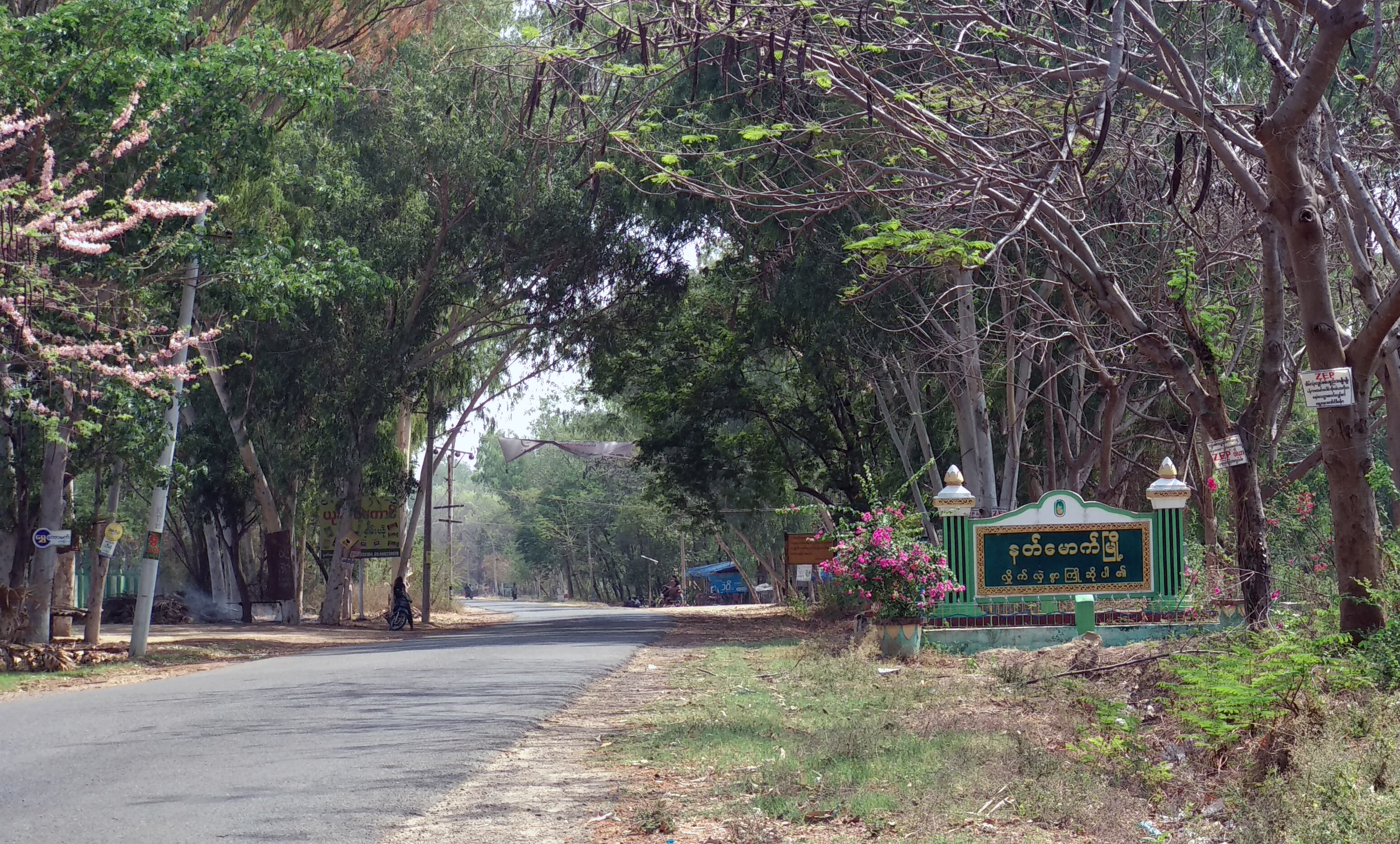

- Location within Myanmar
- Coordinates: 20°21′01″N 95°24′05″E
- Country: Myanmar
- Region: Magway Region
- District: Magway
- Township: Natmauk
- Time zone: UTC+6:30 (+6:30)

Natmauk (Burmese: နတ်မောက်) is a town in Magway District, in eastern Magway Region of Myanmar, on the Yin River. It is the administrative seat of Natmauk Township. Natmauk is famous for being the birthplace and hometown of the Burmese independence hero, Bogyoke Aung San.

== Transport ==
Natmauk is one of major stops on the Yangon to Bagan Express railway road. It also lies about midway on the major east–west Pyawbwe to Magway road.
