= Magway =

Magway, Magwe or Magwi may refer to:

== Places ==
=== Myanmar ===
- Magway, Myanmar, the capital city of Magway Division of Myanmar
- Magway Region (also spelled Magwe Division, formerly Magway Division), an administrative region
- Magway District in Magway Division
- Magway Township in Magway District
- Magway University in Magwe, Burma
- Magwe F.C., a football team from Magway

=== South Sudan ===
- Magwi County, or Magwe County, a county in South Sudan
- Magwi, the seat of Magwi county

== Companies ==
- Magway Ltd, a transportation technology company
