= Aingtha =

- Location in Burma
- Coordinates: 21°8′0″N 95°19′0″E
- Country: Burma
- Division: Mandalay Region
- Township: Kyaukpadaung Township
- Elevation: 292 ft (89 m)

Population (2005)
  - Religions: Buddhism
- Time zone: UTC+6.30 (MST)

Aingtha is a village in the Mandalay Region of north-west Myanmar. It lies in Kyaukpadaung Township in the Myingyan District. The villages lies east off the bank of the Ayeyarwady River.

== See also ==
- List of cities, towns and villages in Burma: A
