= Thaik Taing =

Thaik Taing (r. 513 – 523) was the 12th King of the Early Pagan Kingdom who began his reign in 513 AD. He moved the palace to Tampawaddy, near Thiri Pyissaya.

== Reign ==
In Burmese years 438, he ascended the throne. During his reign, he abandoned Thiri Pyitsaya and shifted royal capital to the surrounding area, renaming it to Tampawaddy. The reason for the relocation is unknown. However, the landslide on the banks of the Irrawaddy River seems to have been worse since then, according to Thaik Taing's curse on the Tayoke Pyan Pagoda inscription, "ငါ့ကောင်းမှုကို ဖျက်သသူကား ညောင်ဦးကသည် သီရိပစ္စယာတိုင်အောင် ကမ်းပြိုသကဲ့သို့ စီးပွားချမ်းသာယုတ်စေသော်" ("To those who destroyed my meritorious deeds: from Nyaung-U to Thiri Pyitsaya, may your sake and prosperity get lesser, as if a landslide destroyed them."). It seems that the king moved to a safer inland area to prevent the riverbank from collapsing.

He died seven years after his accession to the throne.
