= Magway Township =

Magway Township မကွေးမြို့နယ်
- Township
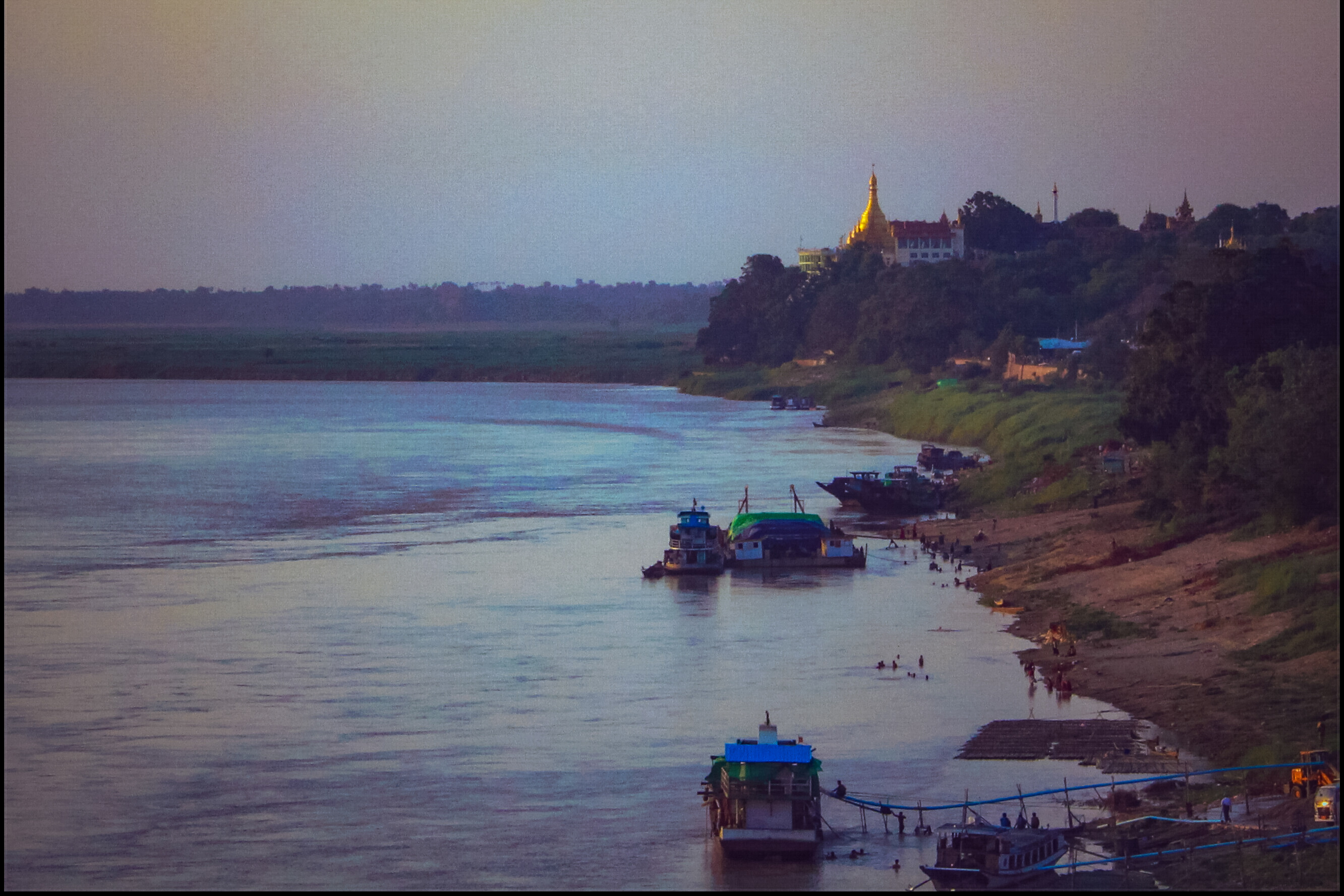
- Myathalun Pagoda, the historical religious landmark in the northern side of Magway Township

- Magway Township in Magway District
- Coordinates: 20°07′N 95°08′E
- Country: Myanmar
- Region: Magway Region
- District: Magway District
- Capital: Magway
- Time zone: UTC+6:30 (MMT)

Magway Township (Burmese: မကွေးမြို့နယ်) is a township of Magway District in the Magway Region of Myanmar. The principal town is Magway.

== Bounds ==
Magway Township is bounded by the following townships:

- Yenangyaung to the north;
- Natmauk to the northeast;
- Myothit to the east;
- Taungdwingyi to the southeast;
- Minhla and Minbu to the west;
- Pwintbyu to the northwest.
