= Taungdwingyi Township =

Township in Magway Division, Myanmar

Coordinates: 20.0167°N 95.5500°E

Taungdwingyi Township တောင်တွင်းကြီးမြို့နယ်
- Township
- Location in Magway district
- Country: Myanmar
- Region: Magway Region
- District: Magway District
- Capital: Taungdwingyi

Area
  - Total: 194 sq mi (503 km^{2})
- Time zone: UTC+6:30 (MMT)

Taungdwingyi Township (Burmese: တောင်တွင်းကြီး မြို့နယ်) is a township of Magway District in the Magway Region of Myanmar. The principal town is Taungdwingyi. People have inhabited this area for thousands of years, and one of the earliest civilizations of Myanmar, Beikthano, the ancient Pyu city, is located near the town. The territorial area is planes, and rice, beans, grains, sugarcane, and other plants were grown there.

== Localities ==
- Aoung Bok
- Satthwa

== Border ==
Taungdwingyi Township is bordered by the following townships:

- Myothit Township to the north
- Sinbaungwe Township to the south
- Lewe Township of Mandalay Region to the east
- Tatkon Township of Mandalay Region to the east
- Magway Township to the west

== Economic ==
The economy of this area is based on agriculture and trading agricultural products. The chief crops raised are rice, beans, peas, grains and sugarcane. Years ago, this area had deep teak forests, and the timber industry was highly developed, but now all the teak trees have disappeared.

== Population ==
According to the 2014 census, the population of Taungdwingyi township was 259,860. The male to female ratio was 90:100. 17.75% of population live in the urban area.

== Transportation ==
Taungdwingyi is connected to the large divisional city Magway (68 km/42 miles) to the west, Pyay(162 km/101 miles) to the south and Naypyidaw (68 km/42 miles) to the east, by means of territorial road and railways. By the territorial road, it is 227 km to Mandalay and 365 km to Yangon. The closest major airport is Magwe Airport (MWQ).

The local villages and town are mostly connected by dirt roads and backroads.

== Weather ==
April is warmest with an average temperature of 39°C at noon. January is coldest with an average temperature of 14°C at night. Temperatures drop sharply at night. January is on average the month with most sunshine. The wet season has a rainfall peak around August. The dry season is around the month of March.

== Nature ==
The area has a humid (>0.65 p/pet) climate. The land area is totally cultivated and not much natural vegetation is left. The landscape is mostly covered with mosaic croplands/vegetation. The climate is classified as a tropical monsoon (short dry season, monsoon rains other months), with a subtropical dry forest biozone. The soil in the area is high in nitosols, andosols (nt), soil with deep, clay-enriched lower horizon with shiny ped surfaces.
