= Pwe Kyit =

- Location in Myanmar
- Coordinates: 20°39′5″N 95°7′29″E
- Country: Myanmar
- Region: Mandalay Region
- Town: Kyaukpadaung

Area
  - Total: 1.30 km^{2} (0.50 sq mi)

Population
  - Estimate (2014): 208

Pye Kwit is a human settlement in Myanmar on the border of the Magway and Mandalay regions.
