= Myothit, Magway Region =

Myothit မြို့သစ်
- Town
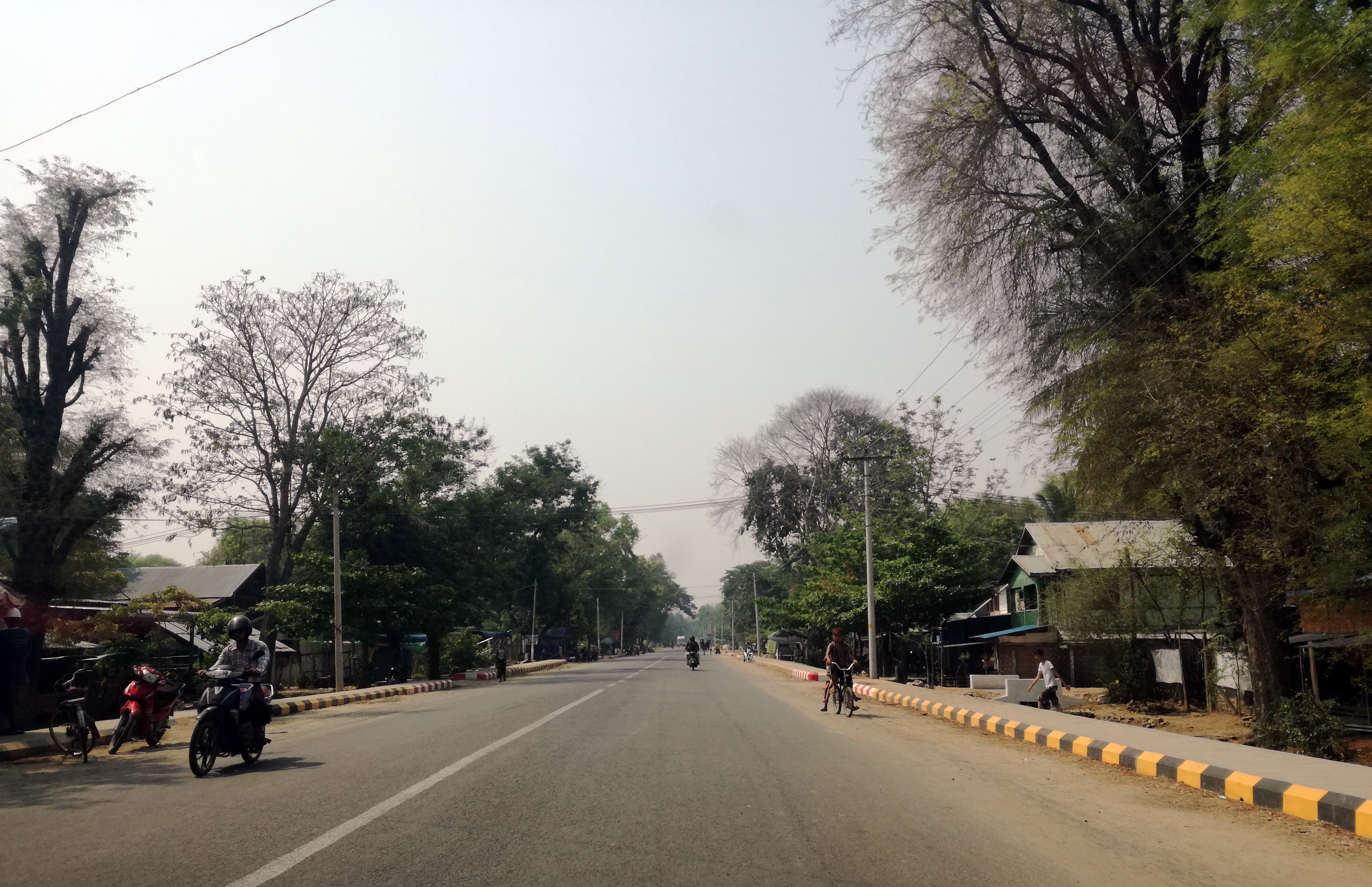

- Location within Myanmar
- Coordinates: 20°12′N 95°27′E
- Country: Myanmar
- Division: Magway Region
- District: Magway District
- Township: Myothit Township

Population (2014)
  - Total: 8,080
- Time zone: UTC+7 (+7)

Myothit (Burmese: မြို့သစ်) is a town of Myothit Township in Magway District in the Magway Region in Myanmar. The population was 8,080 in the 2014 census.
