= Climate of Myanmar =

Köppen climate classification of Myanmar, 1991 to 2020.

The climate of Myanmar varies depending on location and in the highlands, on elevation. The climate is subtropical/tropical and has three seasons, a "cool winter from November to February, a hot summer season in March and April and a rainy season from May to October, dominated by the southwest monsoon."

A large portion of the country lies between the Tropic of Cancer and the Equator and the entirety of the country lies in the monsoon region of Asia, with its coastal regions receiving over 5,000 mm (196.9 in) of rain annually. Annual rainfall in the delta region is approximately 2,500 mm (98.4 in), while average annual rainfall in the central dry zone is less than 1,000 mm (39.4 in).

The higher elevations of the highlands are predisposed to heavy snowfall, especially in the North. The Northern regions of Myanmar are the coolest, with average temperatures of 21 °C (70 °F). Coastal and delta regions have an average maximum temperature of 32 °C (89.6 °F).

== Geography ==
Myanmar has three agro-ecological zones and eight physiographic regions.

=== Agro-ecological zones ===
- Coastal zone
- Central Dry Zone
- Hilly zone

=== Physiographic regions ===
- Rakhine Coastal
- Ayeyarwady Delta
- Yangon Deltaic
- Southern Myanmar Coastal
- Central Dry Zone
- Western Hilly
- Northern Hilly
- Eastern Hilly

== Examples ==
Climate data for Yangon (Kaba–Aye) 1981–2010, extremes 1881–1990
Month	Jan	Feb	Mar	Apr	May	Jun	Jul	Aug	Sep	Oct	Nov	Dec	Year
Record high °C (°F)	38.9 (102.0)	38.9 (102.0)	40.0 (104.0)	41.1 (106.0)	42.0 (107.6)	37.8 (100.0)	37.8 (100.0)	34.4 (93.9)	38.9 (102.0)	37.8 (100.0)	38.9 (102.0)	35.6 (96.1)	42.0 (107.6)
Mean daily maximum °C (°F)	33.2 (91.8)	35.2 (95.4)	36.7 (98.1)	37.5 (99.5)	34.2 (93.6)	30.8 (87.4)	30.3 (86.5)	30.0 (86.0)	30.9 (87.6)	32.2 (90.0)	33.1 (91.6)	32.5 (90.5)	33.1 (91.6)
Daily mean °C (°F)	24.8 (76.6)	26.5 (79.7)	28.6 (83.5)	31.0 (87.8)	29.2 (84.6)	27.4 (81.3)	26.8 (80.2)	26.9 (80.4)	27.5 (81.5)	27.6 (81.7)	27.3 (81.1)	25.0 (77.0)	27.4 (81.3)
Mean daily minimum °C (°F)	16.7 (62.1)	18.4 (65.1)	21.0 (69.8)	23.8 (74.8)	24.3 (75.7)	23.6 (74.5)	23.2 (73.8)	23.2 (73.8)	23.2 (73.8)	23.1 (73.6)	21.3 (70.3)	17.8 (64.0)	21.6 (70.9)
Record low °C (°F)	12.2 (54.0)	13.3 (55.9)	16.1 (61.0)	20.0 (68.0)	20.0 (68.0)	20.0 (68.0)	21.1 (70.0)	20.0 (68.0)	20.0 (68.0)	20.0 (68.0)	15.0 (59.0)	9.2 (48.6)	9.2 (48.6)
Average rainfall mm (inches)	0.4 (0.02)	3.1 (0.12)	12.4 (0.49)	37.8 (1.49)	328.1 (12.92)	565.6 (22.27)	605.8 (23.85)	570.7 (22.47)	393.7 (15.50)	200.3 (7.89)	58.6 (2.31)	6.8 (0.27)	2,783.3 (109.58)
Average rainy days	0.2	0.2	0.4	1.6	12.6	25.3	26.2	26.1	19.5	12.2	4.8	0.2	129.3
Average relative humidity (%)	62	66	69	66	73	85	86	87	85	78	71	65	74
Mean monthly sunshine hours	300	272	290	292	181	80	77	92	97	203	280	288	2,452
Source 1: Norwegian Meteorological Institute (average high and average low, and precipitation 1981–2010), World Meteorological Organization (rainy days 1961–1990), Deutscher Wetterdienst (extremes)
Source 2: Danish Meteorological Institute (sun and relative humidity 1931–1960), Myanmar Times (May record high and December record low) Tokyo Climate Center (mean temperatures 1981–2010)

Climate data for Naypyidaw
Month	Jan	Feb	Mar	Apr	May	Jun	Jul	Aug	Sep	Oct	Nov	Dec	Year
Mean daily maximum °C (°F)	30 (86)	34 (93)	36 (97)	38 (100)	35 (95)	32 (90)	31 (88)	30 (86)	32 (90)	32 (90)	31 (88)	29 (84)	32.5 (90.5)
Mean daily minimum °C (°F)	14 (57)	16 (61)	20 (68)	24 (75)	25 (77)	24 (75)	24 (75)	24 (75)	24 (75)	23 (73)	20 (68)	16 (61)	21.2 (70.2)
Average precipitation mm (inches)	5 (0.2)	2 (0.1)	9 (0.4)	33 (1.3)	154 (6.1)	160 (6.3)	198 (7.8)	229 (9.0)	186 (7.3)	131 (5.2)	37 (1.5)	7 (0.3)	1,151 (45.5)
Average precipitation days	1	0	1	3	14	21	23	24	19	12	4	1	123
Source: Weather2Travel.com. Retrieved 26 March 2013

Climate data for Mandalay (1981–2010, extremes 1889–present)
Month	Jan	Feb	Mar	Apr	May	Jun	Jul	Aug	Sep	Oct	Nov	Dec	Year
Record high °C (°F)	37.2 (99.0)	39.2 (102.6)	42.8 (109.0)	48.0 (118.4)	45.0 (113.0)	42.0 (107.6)	41.6 (106.9)	39.8 (103.6)	43.4 (110.1)	39.2 (102.6)	38.5 (101.3)	34.0 (93.2)	48.0 (118.4)
Mean daily maximum °C (°F)	29.6 (85.3)	32.7 (90.9)	36.6 (97.9)	38.9 (102.0)	36.9 (98.4)	35.2 (95.4)	35.1 (95.2)	34.3 (93.7)	34.0 (93.2)	33.4 (92.1)	31.1 (88.0)	29.1 (84.4)	33.9 (93.0)
Daily mean °C (°F)	21.9 (71.4)	24.4 (75.9)	28.8 (83.8)	31.9 (89.4)	31.3 (88.3)	30.8 (87.4)	30.8 (87.4)	30.2 (86.4)	29.7 (85.5)	28.8 (83.8)	25.7 (78.3)	22.2 (72.0)	28.0 (82.4)
Mean daily minimum °C (°F)	13.7 (56.7)	16.0 (60.8)	20.4 (68.7)	24.7 (76.5)	25.9 (78.6)	26.1 (79.0)	26.2 (79.2)	25.8 (78.4)	25.4 (77.7)	24.0 (75.2)	19.9 (67.8)	15.4 (59.7)	22.0 (71.6)
Record low °C (°F)	8.0 (46.4)	10.0 (50.0)	12.8 (55.0)	13.0 (55.4)	17.4 (63.3)	20.0 (68.0)	20.0 (68.0)	19.5 (67.1)	20.5 (68.9)	18.5 (65.3)	11.1 (52.0)	7.6 (45.7)	7.6 (45.7)
Average rainfall mm (inches)	0.9 (0.04)	3.8 (0.15)	5.8 (0.23)	40.4 (1.59)	130.0 (5.12)	99.5 (3.92)	74.7 (2.94)	132.9 (5.23)	157.1 (6.19)	130.7 (5.15)	36.4 (1.43)	4.9 (0.19)	817.1 (32.17)
Average rainy days	0.4	0.4	0.4	3.3	8.3	7.2	5.9	8.7	8.1	6.8	2.8	0.7	53.0
Average relative humidity (%)	68	58	49	50	66	73	71	76	76	77	74	72	68
Mean monthly sunshine hours	309	280	301	291	267	208	182	168	215	223	269	278	2,991
Source 1: Norwegian Meteorological Institute (average high and average low, and rainfall 1981–2010), World Meteoroglogical Organization (rainy days 1961–1990), Deutscher Wetterdienst (mean temperatures 1991–2010)
Source 2: Danish Meteorological Institute (sun and relative humidity, 1931–1960), Meteo Climat (record highs and lows),

Climate data for Myitkyina (1981-2010, extremes 1951–present)
Month	Jan	Feb	Mar	Apr	May	Jun	Jul	Aug	Sep	Oct	Nov	Dec	Year
Record high °C (°F)	35.0 (95.0)	35.0 (95.0)	38.0 (100.4)	41.1 (106.0)	42.0 (107.6)	40.2 (104.4)	38.3 (100.9)	38.5 (101.3)	37.5 (99.5)	36.2 (97.2)	38.5 (101.3)	35.5 (95.9)	42.0 (107.6)
Mean daily maximum °C (°F)	25.3 (77.5)	27.5 (81.5)	30.4 (86.7)	32.6 (90.7)	33.3 (91.9)	31.6 (88.9)	30.5 (86.9)	32.0 (89.6)	31.7 (89.1)	30.9 (87.6)	28.4 (83.1)	25.8 (78.4)	30.0 (86.0)
Daily mean °C (°F)	18.0 (64.4)	20.3 (68.5)	23.9 (75.0)	26.6 (79.9)	27.6 (81.7)	27.9 (82.2)	27.7 (81.9)	28.3 (82.9)	28.1 (82.6)	26.2 (79.2)	22.5 (72.5)	18.8 (65.8)	24.9 (76.8)
Mean daily minimum °C (°F)	10.4 (50.7)	12.9 (55.2)	16.3 (61.3)	19.7 (67.5)	22.3 (72.1)	24.3 (75.7)	24.5 (76.1)	24.6 (76.3)	23.9 (75.0)	21.5 (70.7)	16.2 (61.2)	11.9 (53.4)	19.0 (66.2)
Record low °C (°F)	3.0 (37.4)	7.5 (45.5)	10.0 (50.0)	10.0 (50.0)	16.1 (61.0)	18.1 (64.6)	18.0 (64.4)	20.0 (68.0)	19.8 (67.6)	15.0 (59.0)	8.0 (46.4)	3.0 (37.4)	3.0 (37.4)
Average rainfall mm (inches)	9.9 (0.39)	21.0 (0.83)	24.0 (0.94)	54.0 (2.13)	218.5 (8.60)	549.2 (21.62)	543.0 (21.38)	398.3 (15.68)	294.7 (11.60)	170.6 (6.72)	25.1 (0.99)	11.7 (0.46)	2,320 (91.34)
Average rainy days (≥ 0.3 mm)	2	7	5	8	15	25	27	28	19	11	3	2	152
Average relative humidity (%)	77	68	64	64	72	83	89	87	85	83	79	78	77
Source 1: Norwegian Meteorological Institute, Deutscher Wetterdienst (mean temperatures 1991–2010, rainy days 1896–1940, humidity 1963–1988)
Source 2: Meteo Climat (record highs and lows)

== Disasters ==
=== Droughts ===
Rising temperatures and increased drought in Myanmar have caused diminished village water sources across the country, destroyed agricultural yields of peas, sugar cane, tomatoes and rice, and are expected to continue having negative effects on agricultural production and food security by further destruction of cultivation and erosion on soils in the long term. There is a large dependence on rain fed agriculture, as over 70% percent of it people's livelihood dependent on natural capital, and 40% of GDP reliant on agriculture, livestock, fisheries, and forestry. In the dry zone, longer more extreme droughts and losses of natural ecosystem services which play a role in retaining sediment force those in more rural areas to travel miles for water where lakes have not dried posing considerable livelihood challenges.

=== Monsoons ===
In August 2015, extreme flooding caused by monsoon rains killed 27 people and affected over 150,000 in the Sagaing region and in July 2018 over 120,000 people over seven regions were displaced from their homes also due to heavy monsoon rains, with the death toll hitting at least 10.

== Climate change ==
Predicted future Köppen climate classification in Myanmar, 2071–2100.

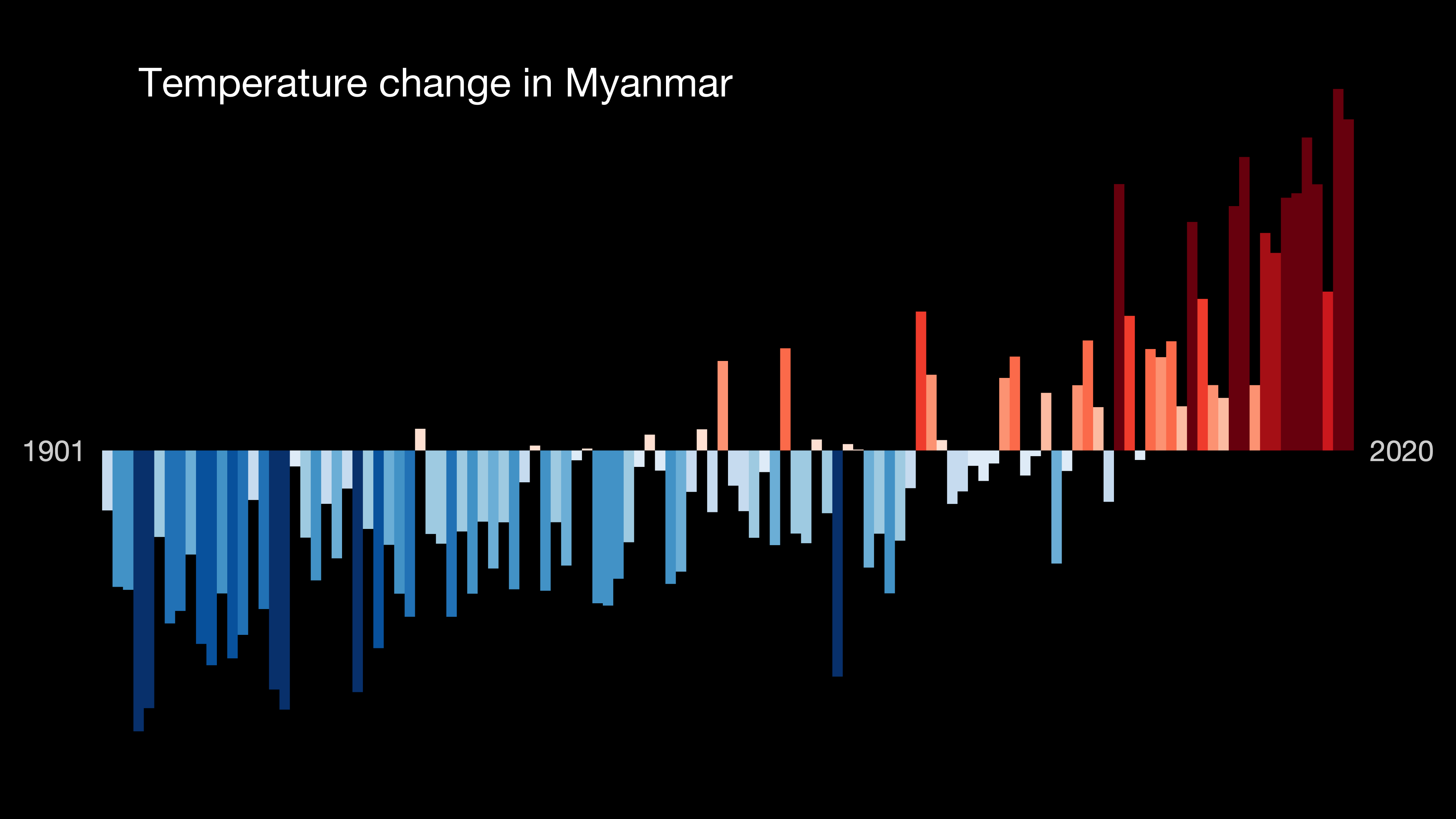
Visualisation of average annual temperature anomaly in Myanmar, 1901 to 2020.

Climate projections show that the mean temperature may increase by about 0.9–2.7 °C by the late 21st century, depending on the emissions scenario. The strongest warming is expected during the hot-dry season and in central regions, with some months reaching increases of up to ~3.6 °C. Precipitation projections do not show a uniform trend. Instead, rainfall is expected to vary by region and season, with decreases in some areas and increases of up to about 40–60% in others, as well as changes in seasonal patterns.

As of 2018, the government of Myanmar has displayed interest in expanding its use of renewable energy and lowering its level of carbon emissions. Groups involved in helping Myanmar with the transition and move forward include the UN-Habitat, the UN Environment Programme, and the Ministry of Natural Resources and Environmental Conservation under Myanmar Climate Change Alliance (MCCA) Programme, funded by the European Union.

In April 2015, it was announced that the World Bank and Myanmar would enter a full partnership framework aimed to better access to electricity and other basic services for about six million people and expected to benefit three million pregnant woman and children through improved health services. Myanmar has also acquired funding and proper planning, which is intended to better prepare the country for the impacts of climate change by enacting programs which teach its people new farming methods, rebuild its infrastructure with materials resilient to natural disasters, and transition various sectors towards reducing greenhouse gas emissions.

To this end the country has also entered the United Nations' Paris Agreement in 2016, created the Myanmar National Climate Change Policy in 2017, submitted its new climate action plan to the UN Framework Convention on Climate Change, and developed the Myanmar Climate Change Strategy & Action Plan. At the same time, Myanmar's state technical capacity to conduct international climate change negotiations and implement environmental agreements remains limited and the country requires external assistance in improving its technical capacities.

=== Heat waves ===
Heat waves in Myanmar with significant impacts are increasingly becoming a disaster risk. As a Tropical country heavily exposed to the impacts of climate change. Since 2019, there has been an increased incidence of fatal heatwaves that have direct impact on the public health and socio-economic conditions of the country.

=== Building local community resilience ===
Under the Myanmar Climate Change Alliance (MCCA2), UN-Habitat is actively supporting local communities in different geo-climatic regions to strengthen their resilience to climate change. Building on lessons from the first phase of the programme, MCCA2 promotes multi-sector resilience through Climate Change Vulnerability Assessments (CCVAs) and Local Climate Action Plans (LCAPs), ensuring that adaptation strategies are locally driven and responsive to specific environmental and socio-economic conditions.

In coastal regions, the programme has invested in mangrove restoration and nature-based solutions to mitigate flooding and erosion risks. In highland areas, it supports flood mitigation, reforestation and agroforestry initiatives, reducing vulnerability to landslides and water scarcity. In the Dry Zone, MCCA2 has worked with communities to improve water security through enhanced storage infrastructure and sustainable watershed management, while promoting climate-resilient agriculture.

By integrating community-led action with policy support, MCCA2 strengthens local capacity to plan and implement adaptation measures, fostering long-term resilience in Myanmar's most vulnerable regions.

=== Dry zone adjustments ===
The government of Myanmar, the United Nations Development Programme, and the Adaptation Fund, are carrying out programs to provide farmers the resources, knowledge and tools needed to support good harvests, despite changing weather patterns. Anticipated to reduce food insecurity and losses from extreme climate events in 42,000 households, the "Addressing Climate Change Risks on Water Resources and Food Security in the Dry Zone of Myanmar" project provides specially developed climate resistant pulses and other crops, as well as special heat resistant breeds of pigs, goats, and poultry to farmers and laborers.

In the past, poverty stricken communities cut down trees for fuels and timber, so now communities are being actively involved in establishing and managing forests in order to improve soil conditions, reduce surface runoff, and slow erosion. Nearly 30,000 households in the region have benefited from enhanced water capture and storage capacity in the forms of expanded community ponds, construction on diversion canals, and rehabilitation and protection of over 4,000 hectares of micro-watersheds. To help Myanmar meet its 2030 Water Sanitation and Hygiene Goals, Lien Aid also continues to partner with local governments and community leaders to improve safe water access in villages throughout Myanmar.
