= Kyaukpadaung Township =

Coordinates: 20°50′N 95°8′E

Kyaukpadaung Township is a township of Nyaung-U District (until 2014, part of Myingyan District) in Mandalay Region of Burma (Myanmar). Its administrative seat is the town of Kyaukpadaung. Important towns include Popaywa and Seiktein (Seikhtain).

Location in Nyaung U district (red colour)

== Geography ==
Kyaukpadaung Township is the southwesternmost township in Myingyan District and borders the following:

- Taungtha Township to the north
- Mahlaing Township to the northeast
- Meiktila Township to the east
- Natmauk Township of Magwe Region to the south
- Yenangyaung Township of Magwe Region to the southwest
- Chauk Township of Magwe Region to the west, and
- Nyaung-U Township to the northwest

The township includes Mount Popa, the Popa Taungkalat monastery, the Salay ruins from the 12th and 13th centuries and the Kyetmauk Taung Reservoir.
