= Aung Pauk =

Village in Myanmar

Coordinates: 20°01′50″N 95°28′32″E

Aung Pauk (also Aoung Bok, Burmese: အောင်းပေါက်) is a village in Taungdwingyi Township, Magway Region, Myanmar. It is one of three villages in the Shan Kaing village tract and has the village code 185321.
