= Yenangyaung University =

University in Myanmar

- ရေနံချောင်းတက္ကသိုလ်
- Former names: Yenangyaung Regional College (1977); Yenangyaung College (1980); Yenangyaung Degree College (2002)
- Type: Public
- Established: 1977; 49 years ago
- Affiliations: Ministry of Education
- Rector: Dr. Cho Cho Myint
- Location: Yenangyaung; 20.4309204°N 94.8792993°E

The Yenangyaung University (Burmese: ရေနံချောင်းတက္ကသိုလ်) is a public university located in Yenangyaung, Magway Region, Myanmar.

== History ==
The Regional College of Yenangyaung was founded on 23 May 1977. It was promoted to the Yenangyaung College in 1980, to Yenangyaung Degree College on 26 June 2002 and to Yenangyaung University on 31, August, 2020.

== Departments ==
- Department of Myanmar
- Department of English
- Department of History
- Department of Philosophy
- Department of Geography
- Department of Oriental Studies
- Department of Mathematics
- Department of Chemistry
- Department of Physics
- Department of Zoology
- Department of Botany
- Department of Geology

== Sport Section ==
Sports facilities are:

- Open shed
- sport ground
- Indoor Stadium and
- Recreation centre

== International Partners ==
- Peoples' Democratic Republic of Laos
- Cambodia
- People's Republic of China
- Thailand
- Vietnam
