= Yenangyaung Government Technical Institute =

Higher education institute in Magway Region, Myanmar

Government Technical Institute, Yenangyaung (YGTI)
- အစိုးရစက်မှုလက်မှုသိပ္ပံ (ရေနံချောင်း) GTI Yenangyaung Logo
- Former name: Government Technical High School
- Type: Public
- Established: 1998; 28 years ago
- Principal: Dr. Win Sandar
- Academic staff: 86
- Students: 711
- Location: Tha Khin Pho La Gyi Road, Shwe Bone Thar Quarter, Yenangyaung, Myanmar; 20.452028°N 94.881995°E
- Colours
- Nickname: YGTI

Government Technical Institute (Yenangyaung) YGTI (Burmese: အစိုးရစက်မှုလက်မှုသိပ္ပံ (ရေနံချောင်း)) is an institute under the Department of Technical, Vocational Education and Training, Ministry of Science and Technology. It is located in Yenangyaung, Magway Region, Myanmar. The area of the institute is 11.75 acres.

== History ==
The Government Technical High School (Yenangyaung) was opened on 1 August 1977. It was promoted to Government Technical Institute on 1 December 1998.

== Facilities ==
Drawing rooms and several classrooms are available to all students for private study. The library opens from 8:00 to 16:00 on weekdays. It holds a wide variety of technology-based books, magazines, journals and past papers. Internet and computer access are also available.

== List of Principals ==
Principal name	Duration	Notes
U Thein Zan	1977–1980	B.sc (Engineering)
U San Lin	1980–1994	BE (Civil)
U San Ngwe	1990–1994	BE (Arch;)
U Kyaw Swe	1994–1996	BE (Civil)
U Aung Kyaw Myint	1996–2003	BE (Civil)
U Kyaw Myo Hlaing	2003–2005	ME (Petrol)
U Khin Mg Nyunt	2005–2010	ME (Chemical) Rus
Dr. Kyaw Kyaw Myint	2010–2018	Ph.D. (Mech;)
Dr. Win Sandar	2018–	Ph.D (EP)

== Faculty ==
=== Engineering Departments ===
1. Civil Engineering Department
2. Electronic and Communication Engineering Department
3. Electrical Power Engineering Department
4. Mechanical Engineering Department

=== Academic departments ===
1. Engineering Mathematics Department
2. Engineering Science Department
3. English Department
4. Myanmar Department

=== Administrative Units ===
1. Administration Department
2. Student's Affairs Department
3. Finance Department
4. Library Department

== Programs ==
Graduate Program	Degree	Duration (years)
Diploma of Civil Engineering	A.G.T.I (Civil)	3
Diploma of Electronic and Communication Engineering	A.G.T.I (EC)	3
Diploma of Electrical Power Engineering	A.G.T.I (EP)	3
Diploma of Mechanical Engineering	A.G.T.I (ME)	3

== See also ==
- List of universities in Myanmar
