= Chauk =

Chauk ချောက်
- Town
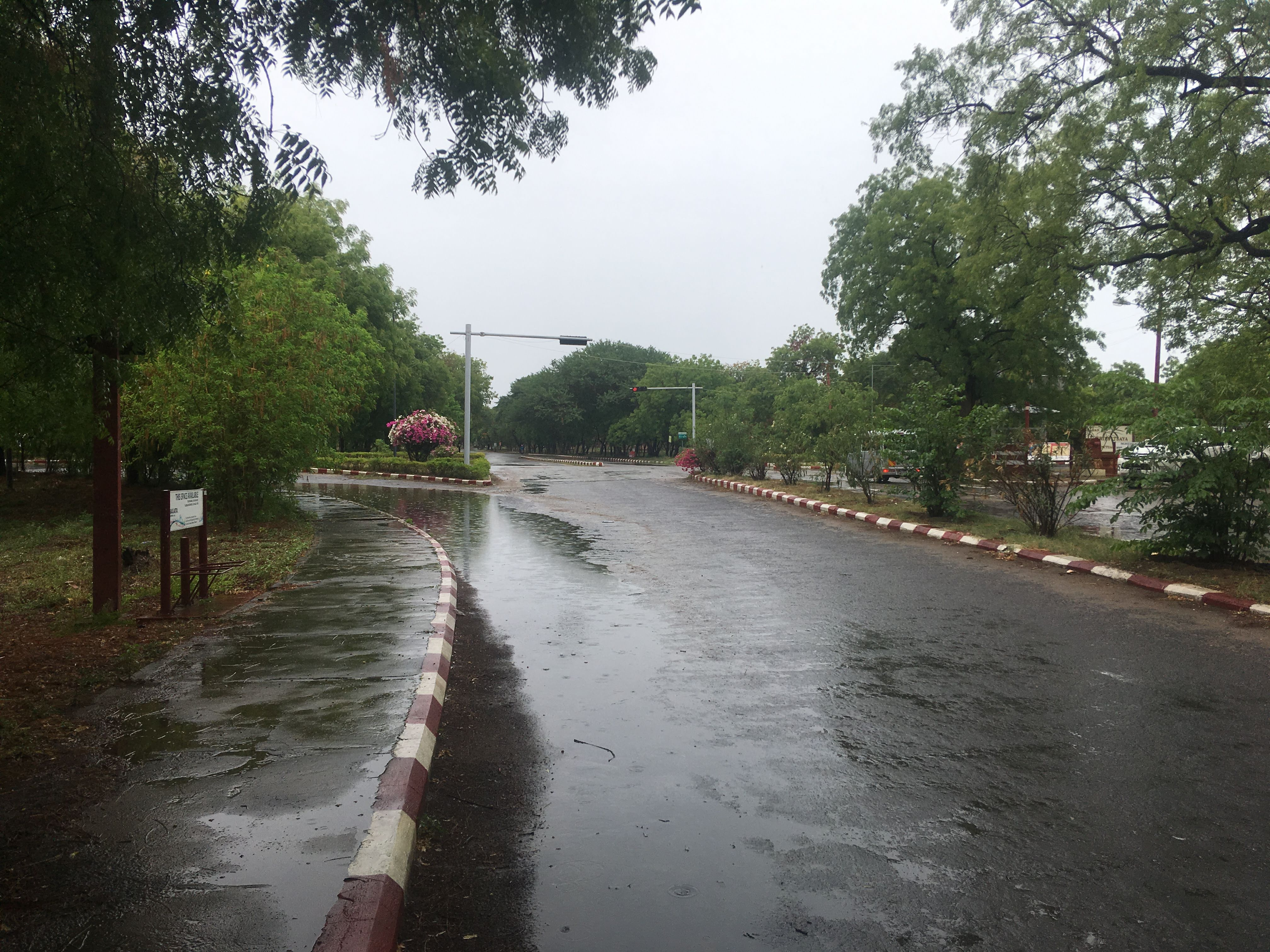
- The Bagan-Chauk Road crossing, close to Bagan

- Location in Myanmar (Burma)
- Coordinates: 20°53′N 94°49′E
- Country: Myanmar
- Division: Magway Region
- District: Chauk District
- Township: Chauk Township

Population (2014 Census)
  - Total: 44,289
- Time zone: UTC+6.30 (MMT)

Chauk (Burmese: ချောက်) is a town and river port in Magway Region, north-central Myanmar, on the Irrawaddy River. It is located across the river from Seikphyu (ဆိပ်ဖြူ), to which it is connected by a bridge. It is the capital of Chauk District

== History ==
In 1902, the Chauk-Lonywa oilfield was discovered near Chauk, which is presently a major source of income for the town.

On January 2, 2014, Singapore's Interra Resources announced that its jointly controlled entity, Goldpetrol Joint Operating Company Inc., had commenced drilling development well CHK 1177 in the Chauk oilfield in Myanmar.

== Climate ==
Located in the "Dry Valley" of central Myanmar in the rain shadow of the Arakan Mountains, Chauk has a borderline hot semi-arid climate (Köppen BSh), being a little too dry to qualify as a tropical savanna climate (Aw) due to the extreme heat and high potential evapotranspiration. Unlike most monsoonal semi-arid climates, the rainy season in the "Dry Valley" is relatively long at around five to seven months, while variability and extreme monthly and daily rainfalls are much lower than usual with this type of climate.

Climate data for Chauk (1991–2020)
Month	Jan	Feb	Mar	Apr	May	Jun	Jul	Aug	Sep	Oct	Nov	Dec	Year
Record high °C (°F)	37.2 (99.0)	41.0 (105.8)	45.2 (113.4)	48.2 (118.8)	47.5 (117.5)	45.0 (113.0)	43.5 (110.3)	41.6 (106.9)	41.0 (105.8)	41.2 (106.2)	41.2 (106.2)	39.0 (102.2)	48.2 (118.8)
Mean daily maximum °C (°F)	31.0 (87.8)	34.6 (94.3)	38.4 (101.1)	40.7 (105.3)	38.7 (101.7)	35.6 (96.1)	35.2 (95.4)	34.6 (94.3)	34.2 (93.6)	33.9 (93.0)	32.8 (91.0)	30.8 (87.4)	35.0 (95.0)
Daily mean °C (°F)	22.1 (71.8)	24.9 (76.8)	29.1 (84.4)	32.6 (90.7)	32.4 (90.3)	30.7 (87.3)	30.5 (86.9)	30.1 (86.2)	29.7 (85.5)	28.9 (84.0)	26.5 (79.7)	23.0 (73.4)	28.4 (83.1)
Mean daily minimum °C (°F)	13.1 (55.6)	15.3 (59.5)	19.8 (67.6)	24.4 (75.9)	26.1 (79.0)	25.9 (78.6)	25.8 (78.4)	25.6 (78.1)	25.2 (77.4)	24.0 (75.2)	20.1 (68.2)	15.3 (59.5)	21.7 (71.1)
Record low °C (°F)	7.2 (45.0)	8.5 (47.3)	14.0 (57.2)	18.9 (66.0)	17.8 (64.0)	22.5 (72.5)	23.5 (74.3)	22.2 (72.0)	21.2 (70.2)	17.4 (63.3)	10.8 (51.4)	9.0 (48.2)	7.2 (45.0)
Average precipitation mm (inches)	4.9 (0.19)	1.3 (0.05)	3.3 (0.13)	8.8 (0.35)	81.7 (3.22)	70.4 (2.77)	38.7 (1.52)	99.6 (3.92)	138.4 (5.45)	132.3 (5.21)	20.1 (0.79)	3.8 (0.15)	603.4 (23.76)
Average precipitation days (≥ 1.0 mm)	0.3	0.1	0.4	1.2	5.3	6.8	4.8	8.4	9.8	7.5	1.8	0.6	47.0
Source 1: World Meteorological Organization
Source 2: Meteomanz (extremes since 2014)

== Earthquake ==
The 6.8 Mw August 2016 Myanmar earthquake shook north-central Myanmar on August 24, with a maximum Mercalli intensity of VI (Strong). Four people were killed and several ancient temples sustained damage.

== Economy ==
A refinery was built in Chauk for the Chauk-Lonywa oilfield that also processes crude oil that comes down a pipeline from Yenangyaung. The Chauk field was still producing natural gas as of 1995.
