= Yenangyaung Township =

Coordinates: 20.4500°N 94.8667°E

Yenangyaung Township ရေနံချောင်းမြို့နယ်
- Township
- Location in Chauk district
- Country: Myanmar
- Region: Magway Region
- District: Magway District
- Capital: Yenangyaung
- Time zone: UTC+6:30 (MMT)

Yenangyaung Township (Burmese: ရေနံချောင်းမြို့နယ်) is a township of Chauk District in the Magway Region of Myanmar. The principal town is Yenangyaung.

Yenangyaung is bordered on the south by Magway, on the east by Natmauk, on the north by Chauk, on the northeast by Kyaukpadaung and on the west by Pwintbyu. The total area of the region is 388.95 square miles or 248,931 acres, comprising 2.25% of Magway Region.

A river runs through the west edge of the area called the Irrawady. Just east of the river, the map depicts a large hilly or mountainous region.

Farmers in the region planted 15,289 acres of pigeon pea (61 km^2) in the year preceding June 2025.

== Towns ==
There are many towns in the township.

In the southwest near the river are Sar Taing, Yone Seik Myauk, Yone Seik Taung, Than Ban Tin, Lan Ku, Gone Thaung, Be Seik, Myuak Shar Taw, Wet Lut Ywar Ma, Wet Lut Ywar Thit, Taung Shar Taw, Let Pan Khon, Yone Seik Kyun, Kyi Gyi, Thu Htay Kone, Ngar Lan Tar, Wet Ma Sut, and Pay Taw.

West of the main road passing through Yenangyaung include Kyi Mint (North), Zaung Chan Kone, Thone Se Chauk, U Yin Su, Oe Bo, Gyoke Pin, Ywar Thit Gyi, Tha Pyay Pin, Chaung Ma, Gyi Wa, Pin Wa, Pin Wa Kyun, Hpa Yar Kone, Ywar Thar Kone, Hpa Ye Kyun, Ywar Thit Ka Lay, Nyaung Pin Thar, Htein Chaung, Shar Ta Pin, Dan Kone, Ywar Thar Nyunt, Hpaung Ka Taw (North & South), Su Lay Kyun, Ywar Ma, Bu Kyun (East, North, South), Nat Sin, and other towns.

More towns are present east of the main road, though they are much more sparse. They tend to follow rivers.
