= Chauk Township =

Chauk Township ချောက်မြို့နယ်
- Township
- Location (in red) in Chauk district
- Coordinates: 20°46′N 94°52′E
- Country: Myanmar
- Region: Magway Region
- District: Chauk District
- Time zone: UTC+6:30 (MMT)

Chauk Township (Burmese: ချောက် မြို့နယ်) is a township of Chauk District in central Magway Region, Myanmar. The principal town and administrative seat is Chauk.

== Borders ==
Chauk Township is bounded by the following townships:

- Seikpyu Township to the northwest;
- Pakokku Township to the north;
- Nyaung-U Township, Mandalay Region, to the northeast;
- Kyaukpadaung Township, Mandalay Region, to the east;
- Yenangyaung Township to the south; and
- Salin Township to the west.
