= Kyaukpadaung =

Kyaukpadaung ကျောက်ပန်းတောင်းမြို့
- Town
- Location in Burma
- Coordinates: 20°50′N 95°8′E
- Country: Myanmar
- Region: Mandalay
- District: Nyaung-U District
- Township: Kyaukpadaung Township
- Time zone: UTC+6.30 (GMT+6:30)

Kyaukpadaung (Burmese: ကျောက်ပန်းတောင်းမြို့ [tɕaʊʔ bə dáʊɰ̃ mjo̰]) is a town in Mandalay Region in Central Myanmar. It lies just south-west of Mount Popa. It is the administrative seat for Kyaukpadaung Township.

The town was the scene of extensive fighting at the end of World War Two.
