= Yin River =

River in Myanmar

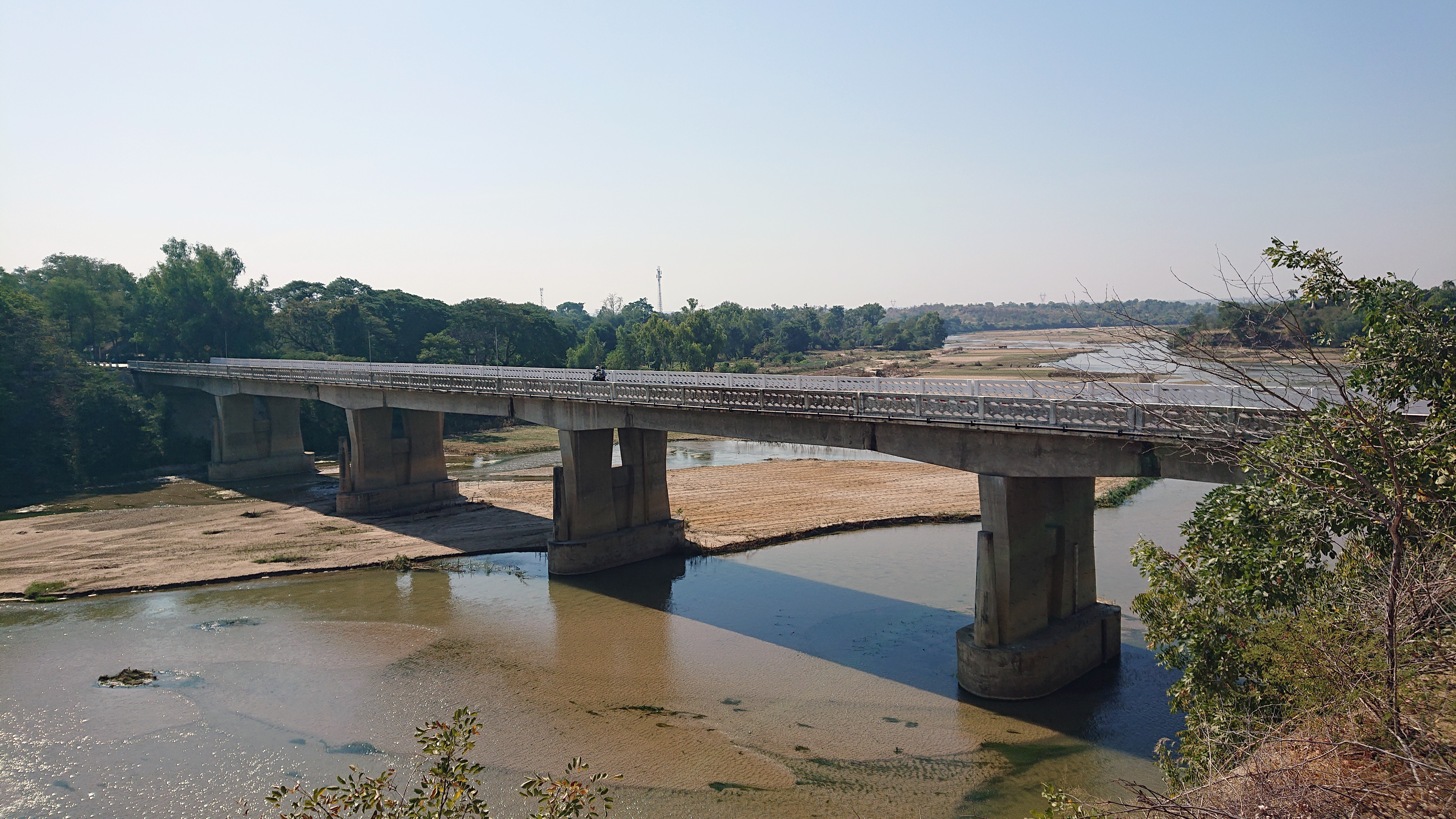
Yin River and the bridge near Magway

The Yin River (Yin Chaung) is a river in Magway Region, in central Burma (Myanmar), a tributary of the Irrawaddy.

Arising off the southwestern slopes of Mount Natsim (1289 ft.) and the eastern slopes of Mount Okshitkon (1104 ft.) and Mount Setkya (1232 ft.), the Yin River flows south past the town of Natmauk and various other villages, turning west at about latitude 20.07° N. Twisting and turning through the mountains it enters the Irrawaddy just below the city of Magway, at 20°01′03″N 95°00′54″E.

== See also ==
- List of rivers of Burma
