= Tampawaddy =

Tampawaddy or Tamrawati (Burmese: တမ္ပဝတီ, pronounced [tàɰ̃pa̰wədì], also spelt Tampavatī, Sanskrit: ताम्बावती Taambavatee, lit. 'City of the Bronze') is a classical name of the city of Bagan (Pagan), Myanmar. According to the Burmese chronicles, King Thaik Taing (r. 516–523) moved the palace from Thiri Pyissaya to nearby Tampawaddy. However, evidence indicates that the earliest human settlement in the Bagan region dates only from the mid-7th century CE.

== Bibliography ==
- Aung-Thwin, Michael A. (2005). The Mists of Rāmañña: The Legend that was Lower Burma (illustrated ed.). Honolulu: University of Hawai'i Press. ISBN 9780824828868.
- Kala, U (1724). Maha Yazawin (in Burmese). Vol. 1–3 (2006, 4th printing ed.). Yangon: Ya-Pyei Publishing.
