= Chauk District =

District in Magway Region, Myanmar

Chauk District ချောက်ခရိုင်
- Chauk District (Red) in Magway Region
- Coordinates: 20.597°N 94.974°E
- Country: Myanmar
- Region: Magway Region
- Capital: Chauk
- Time zone: MMT

Chauk District (Burmese: ချောက်ခရိုင်) is a district in Magway Region, Myanmar. It was split from Magway District on 30 April 2022 and contains two townships. Its district seat is Chauk.

== Townships ==
Townships in Chauk District:

- Chauk Township
- Yenangyaung Township
