= Popa Sawrahan =

Pagan Dynasty king

Popa Sawrahan ပုပ္ပါးစောရဟန်း

King of Pagan
- Reign: 613-640
- Predecessor: Htun Kyit
- Successor: Shwe Ohnthi
- Died: 640; Pagan
Names
- Pawkkan Pyaeshin Saya Saṅgharajā (ပေါက္ကံပြည့်ရှင် ဆရာသင်္ဃရာဇ်)
- House: Pagan
- Religion: Ari Buddhism?

Popa Sawrahan (Burmese: ပုပ္ပါးစောရဟန်း) was the 20th king of Pagan Dynasty of Burma and the eighth king of Tampavati period of Bagan. He was notable for restarting the Burmese calendar in Bagan history and one of the two Sawrahan kings of Bagan Dynasty.

He was advised to reign over Pagan by his student, Queen Saṅgharāj (သင်္ဃရာဇ် မိဖုရား). In 640 AD (562 Burmese Year), he encountered Khachapañja kendra (ခ ဆ ပဉ္ဇကိန်း) or "the number needed to demolish year number". He subtracted 560 years from year 562, leaving a remainder of 2 years. Burmese people have been counting from the year two without restarting the calendar again.

== Legend ==
Sawrahan is the former monk seized the throne after King Htun Chit died in 613 CE. He launched the Burmese calendar on 21 March 640 CE, with the starting date of 22 March 638. (Note: (Maha Yazawin Vol. 1 2006: 143): The calendar was reset, leaving two years, in year 640 CE. The starting date of the Burmese calendar was 22 March 638; Year 2 of the Burmese calendar began on 21 March 640 per (Eade 1989: 39).) (According to scholarship, the Burmese calendar was actually launched at Sri Ksetra (Pyay/Prome) by the Pyu.) Popa Sawrahan made peace with the royal line by giving his daughter to Shwe Ohnthi, son of Htun Chit and rightful heir, and making his son-in-law the heir apparent. Popa Sawrahan died in 640 soon after his new calendar was launched, and Shwe Ohnthi succeeded, restoring the Pyusawhti line.
