= Thiri Pyissaya =

Thiri Pyissaya သီရိပစ္စယာ
- Thiri Pyissaya
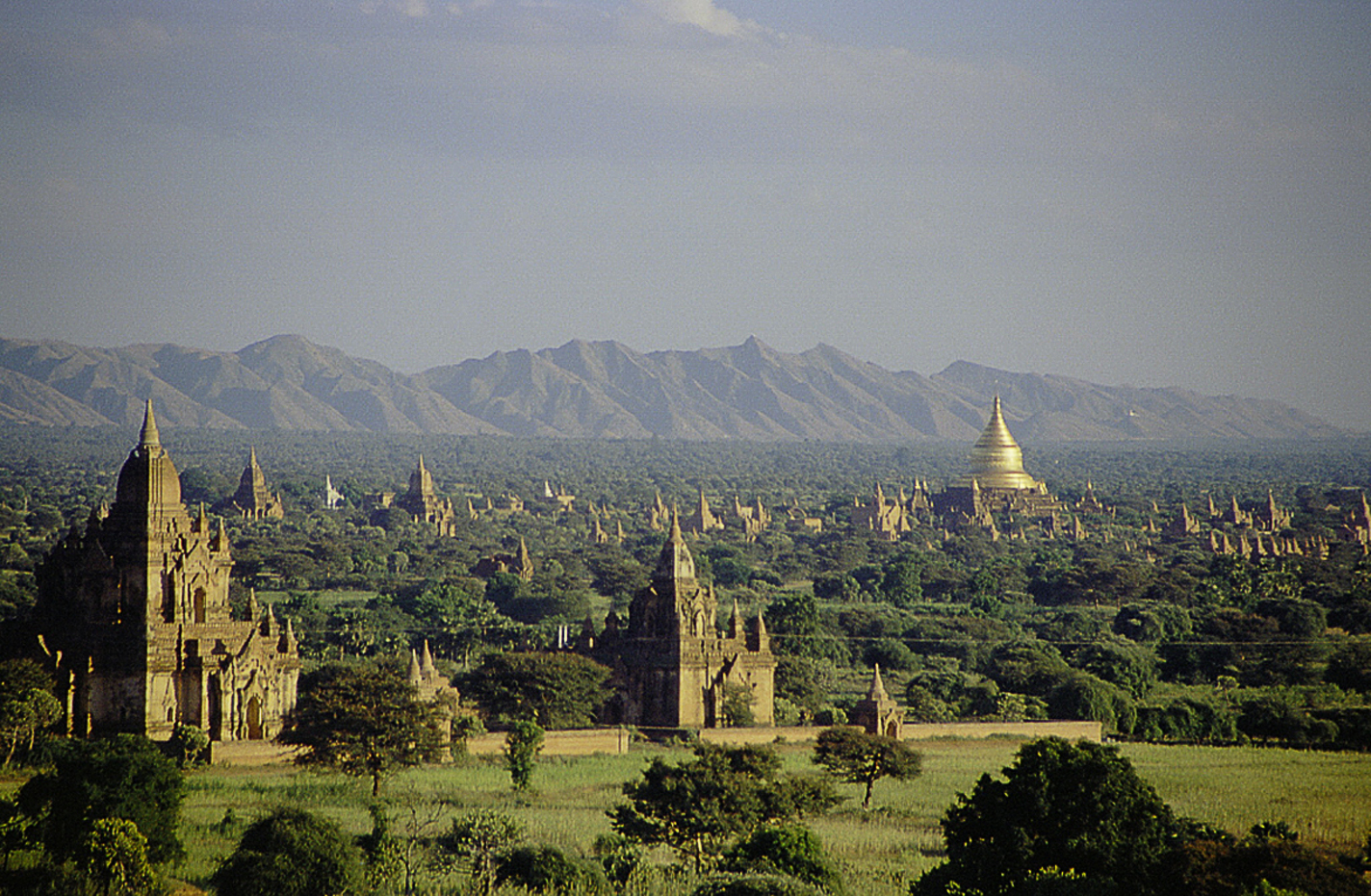
- Temples in Bagan

- Location of Bagan, Burma
- Coordinates: 21°10′N 94°52′E
- Country: Burma
- Region: Mandalay Region
- Founded: 12 December 950

Population
  - Ethnicities: Bamar
  - Religions: Theravada Buddhism
- Time zone: UTC+6.30 (MST)

Thiri Pyissaya (Burmese: သီရိပစ္စယာ, pronounced [θìɹḭ pjɪʔsəjà]; also spelled Siripaccaya, Sanskrit: श्रीप्रत्यय Śripratyaya lit. 'City with Gracious Support') is a classical name of the city of Bagan, Myanmar. According to the Hmannan Yazawin chronicle, King Thinli Kyaung I (r. 344–387) moved the palace to Thiri Pyissaya, not far from the original site at Arimaddana (modern Nyaung U). It ceased being the site of the palace when King Thaik Taing (r. 516–523) moved the palace to Tampawaddy, near Thiri Pyissaya.

The chronicle Zatadawbon Yazawin disagrees with Hmannan, stating that the city was founded on Thursday, 1st waxing of Pyatho 312 Saka Era (Saturday, 22 December 390 CE). However, archaeological evidence so far indicates that the earliest human settlement in the Pagan region dates only from the mid-7th century CE. Therefore the date may likely be the Burmese calendar. Indeed, 1st waxing of Pyatho 312 ME (12 December 950 CE) was a Thursday.

== Bibliography ==
- Aung-Thwin, Michael A. (2005). The Mists of Rāmañña: The Legend that was Lower Burma (illustrated ed.). Honolulu: University of Hawai'i Press. ISBN 9780824828868.
- Kala, U (2006) [1724]. Maha Yazawin (in Burmese). Vol. 1–3 (4th printing ed.). Yangon: Ya-Pyei Publishing.
- Royal Historians of Burma (1960) [c. 1680]. U Hla Tin (Hla Thamein) (ed.). Zatadawbon Yazawin (in Burmese). Historical Research Directorate of the Union of Burma.
