= Nyaung-U =

Nyaung-U ညောင်ဦးမြို့
- Town
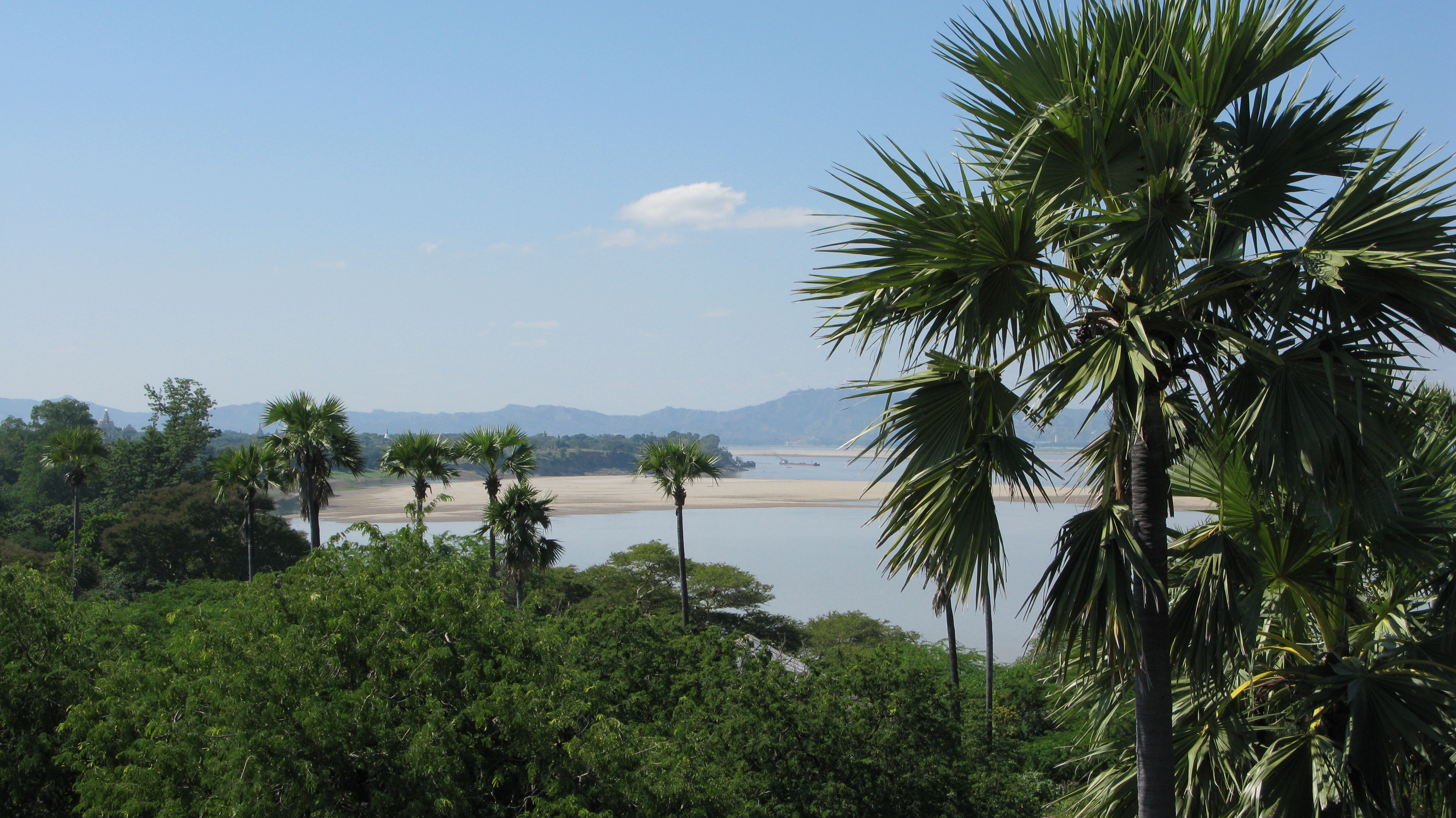

- Location in Burma
- Coordinates: 21°12′N 94°55′E
- Country: Myanmar
- Division: Mandalay
- District: Nyaung-U District
- Township: Nyaung-U Township

Population (2014)
  - Total: 48,528
  - Religions: Buddhism
- Time zone: UTC+6.30 (MST)

Nyaung-U (Burmese: ညောင်ဦးမြို့) is the administrative town of Nyaung-U Township of Nyaung-U District in the Mandalay Region of central Myanmar. It lies on the eastern bank of Ayeyarwady River. It is just 4 kilometers away from old Bagan, a popular tourist attraction. The Shwezigon Pagoda is located there. The other popular places in and around Nyaung-U are

- Htilominlo Pagoda
- Gubyaukgyi Pagoda
- Ahlodawpyae Pagoda and
- Hgnet Pyit Taung Hill

The town can be reached by railway, by bus and by air as it is home to Bagan-Nyaung U Airport (IATA: NYU, ICAO: VYBG). and by boat. Nyaung U is the primary air gateway to the ancient sites of Bagan and surrounding area. The airport is at an elevation of 358 feet (109 m) above mean sea level and has one runway designated 18/36 with an asphalt surface measuring 2,591 by 30 metres (8,501 ft × 98 ft).

It has a population of 48,528.

== Climate ==
Nyaung-U has a hot semi-arid climate (Köppen BSh) due to the rain shadow of the Arakan Mountains. Afternoon temperatures are hot to sweltering throughout the year, although mornings at the height of the dry season between December and February are comfortable. Rainfall occurs between May and early November, but totals only about one-eighth that of the extreme tropical monsoon climate of Sittwe at the same latitude on the Bay of Bengal. Unlike most monsoonal semi-arid climates, the rainy season is relatively long at around five to six months, while variability and extreme monthly and daily rainfalls are much lower than usual with this type of climate.

The 8.10 inches or 205.7 millimetres rainfall of 19 October 2011 was the record breaking one for past 47 years. The previous record was 5.67 inches or 144.0 millimetres on 9 October 1989.

Climate data for Nyaung-U (1991–2020)
Month	Jan	Feb	Mar	Apr	May	Jun	Jul	Aug	Sep	Oct	Nov	Dec	Year
Mean daily maximum °C (°F)	29.8 (85.6)	33.2 (91.8)	37.2 (99.0)	39.7 (103.5)	38.0 (100.4)	35.4 (95.7)	35.2 (95.4)	34.2 (93.6)	33.6 (92.5)	32.9 (91.2)	31.8 (89.2)	29.5 (85.1)	34.2 (93.6)
Daily mean °C (°F)	21.5 (70.7)	24.2 (75.6)	28.5 (83.3)	32.1 (89.8)	32.2 (90.0)	30.9 (87.6)	30.8 (87.4)	30.1 (86.2)	29.5 (85.1)	28.4 (83.1)	25.8 (78.4)	22.3 (72.1)	28.0 (82.4)
Mean daily minimum °C (°F)	13.3 (55.9)	15.2 (59.4)	19.9 (67.8)	24.5 (76.1)	26.3 (79.3)	26.4 (79.5)	26.5 (79.7)	26.0 (78.8)	25.4 (77.7)	24.0 (75.2)	19.8 (67.6)	15.2 (59.4)	21.9 (71.4)
Average precipitation mm (inches)	4.4 (0.17)	1.7 (0.07)	4.8 (0.19)	11.6 (0.46)	106.2 (4.18)	68.4 (2.69)	38.6 (1.52)	96.7 (3.81)	143.5 (5.65)	129.3 (5.09)	25.9 (1.02)	4.3 (0.17)	635.5 (25.02)
Average precipitation days (≥ 1.0 mm)	0.5	0.3	0.5	1.6	6.4	6.6	5.1	8.9	10.2	7.9	2.4	1.0	51.5
Source: World Meteorological Organization
