= Myothit Township =

Coordinates: 20.2000°N 95.4500°E

Myothit Township မြို့သစ် မြို့နယ်
- Township
- Location in Magway district
- Country: Myanmar
- Region: Magway Region
- District: Magway District
- Capital: Myothit

Area
  - Total: 612.7 sq mi (1,586.8 km^{2})

Population (2014)
  - Total: 159,511
  - Density: 260/sq mi (100.5/km^{2})
- Time zone: UTC+6:30 (MMT)

Myothit Township (Burmese: မြို့သစ် မြို့နယ်) is a township of Magway District in the Magway Region of Myanmar. The principal town is Myothit.
