= Arimaddana =

Arimaddana အရိမဒ္ဒနာပူရ Bagan
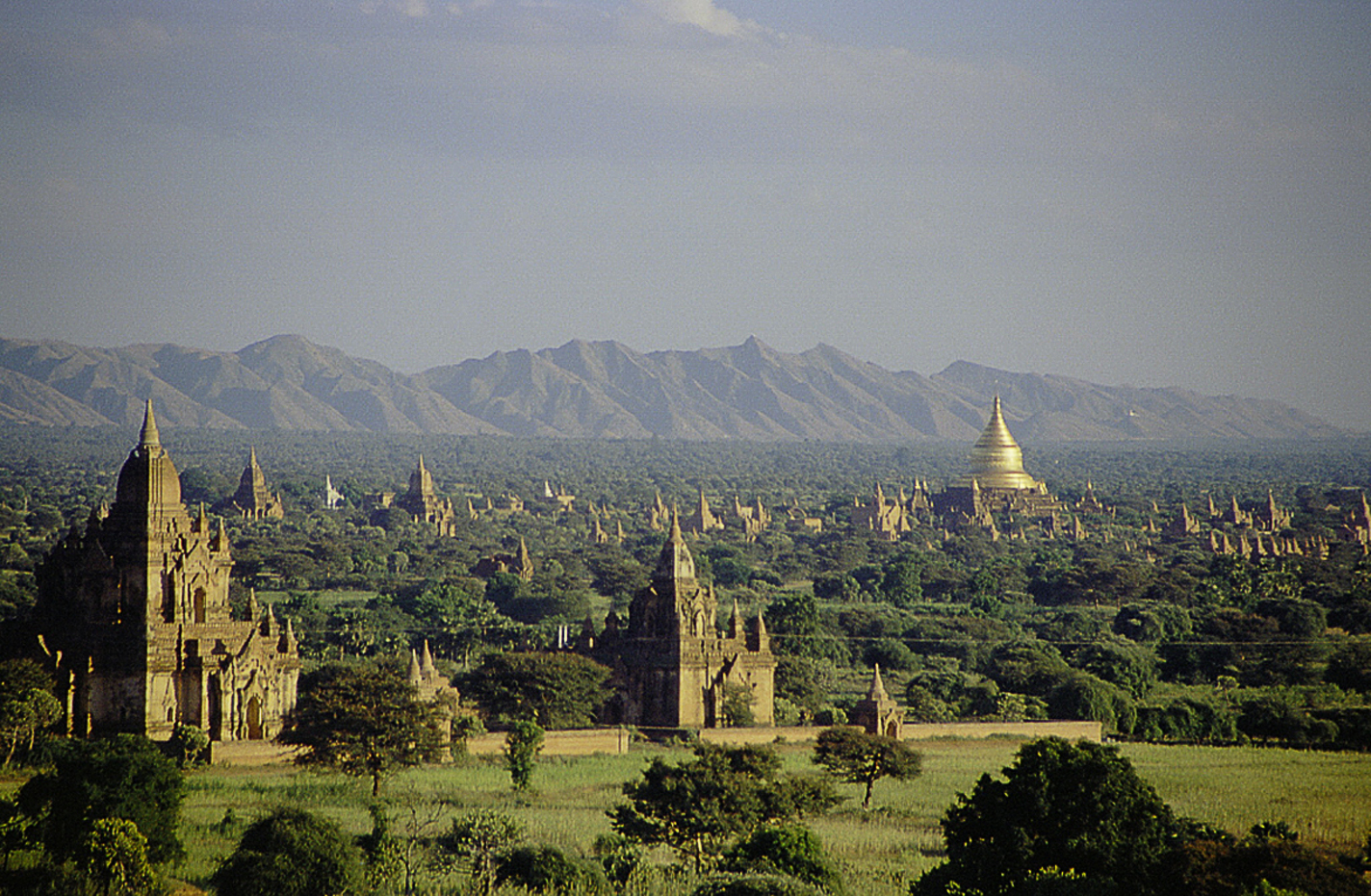
- Temples in Bagan

- Location of Bagan, Burma
- Coordinates: 21°10′N 94°52′E
- Country: Burma
- Region: Mandalay Region
- Founded: 22 March 750

Population
  - Ethnicities: Bamar
  - Religions: Theravada Buddhism
- Time zone: UTC+6.30 (MST)

Arimardanna Pura (Burmese: အရိမဒ္ဒနာပူရ, pronounced [ʔəɹḭ maʔdənà pùɹa̰]; Sanskrit: अरिमर्दनपुर Arimardanapur, lit. 'Foe-crusher City') is the most famous classical name of the city of Bagan (Pagan), Myanmar. It means the "City that Tramples on Enemies."

The Burmese chronicles do not agree on the foundation facts. The 16th century chronicle Yazawin Kyaw states that it was founded in 156 CE by King Pyusawhti. The oldest chronicle Zatadawbon Yazawin says it was founded in 190 CE (Sunday, 15th waxing of Tagu 112 of Early Pyu calendar) by King Pyusawhti. However, later standard chronicles of Toungoo and Konbaung dynasties, Maha Yazawin and Hmannan Yazawin respectively, state that the city was founded in 107 CE by King Thamoddarit, a scion of Sri Ksetra Kingdom. The chronicles continue that King Thinli Kyaung I (r. 344–387) moved the palace to nearby Thiri Pyissaya.

However, evidence indicates that the earliest human settlement in the Pagan region dates only from the mid-7th century CE. Therefore, Zata's foundation date is probably based on the Burmese calendar, and the foundation date would be Sunday, 22 March 750.

== Bibliography ==
- Aung-Thwin, Michael A. (2005). The Mists of Rāmañña: The Legend that was Lower Burma (illustrated ed.). Honolulu: University of Hawai'i Press. ISBN 9780824828868.
- Kala, U (1724). Maha Yazawin (in Burmese). Vol. 1–3 (2006, 4th printing ed.). Yangon: Ya-Pyei Publishing.
- Lieberman, Victor B. (2003). Strange Parallels: Southeast Asia in Global Context, c. 800–1830, volume 1, Integration on the Mainland. Cambridge University Press. ISBN 978-0-521-80496-7.
- Maha Thilawuntha, Shin (1928). Pe Maung Tin (ed.). Yazawin Kyaw (in Burmese) (4th printing, 2010 ed.). Yangon: Burma Research Society (original publisher), Ya-Pyei (4th printing).
- Royal Historians of Burma (c. 1680). U Hla Tin (Hla Thamein) (ed.). Zatadawbon Yazawin (1960 ed.). Historical Research Directorate of the Union of Burma.
- Royal Historical Commission of Burma (1829–1832). Hmannan Yazawin (in Burmese). Vol. 1–3 (2003 ed.). Yangon: Ministry of Information, Myanmar.
