= Nyaung-U Township =

Township of Nyaung-U District in Mandalay Region, Myanmar

Nyaung-U Township Nyaungu, Nyoungoo, Nyaungoo
- Township
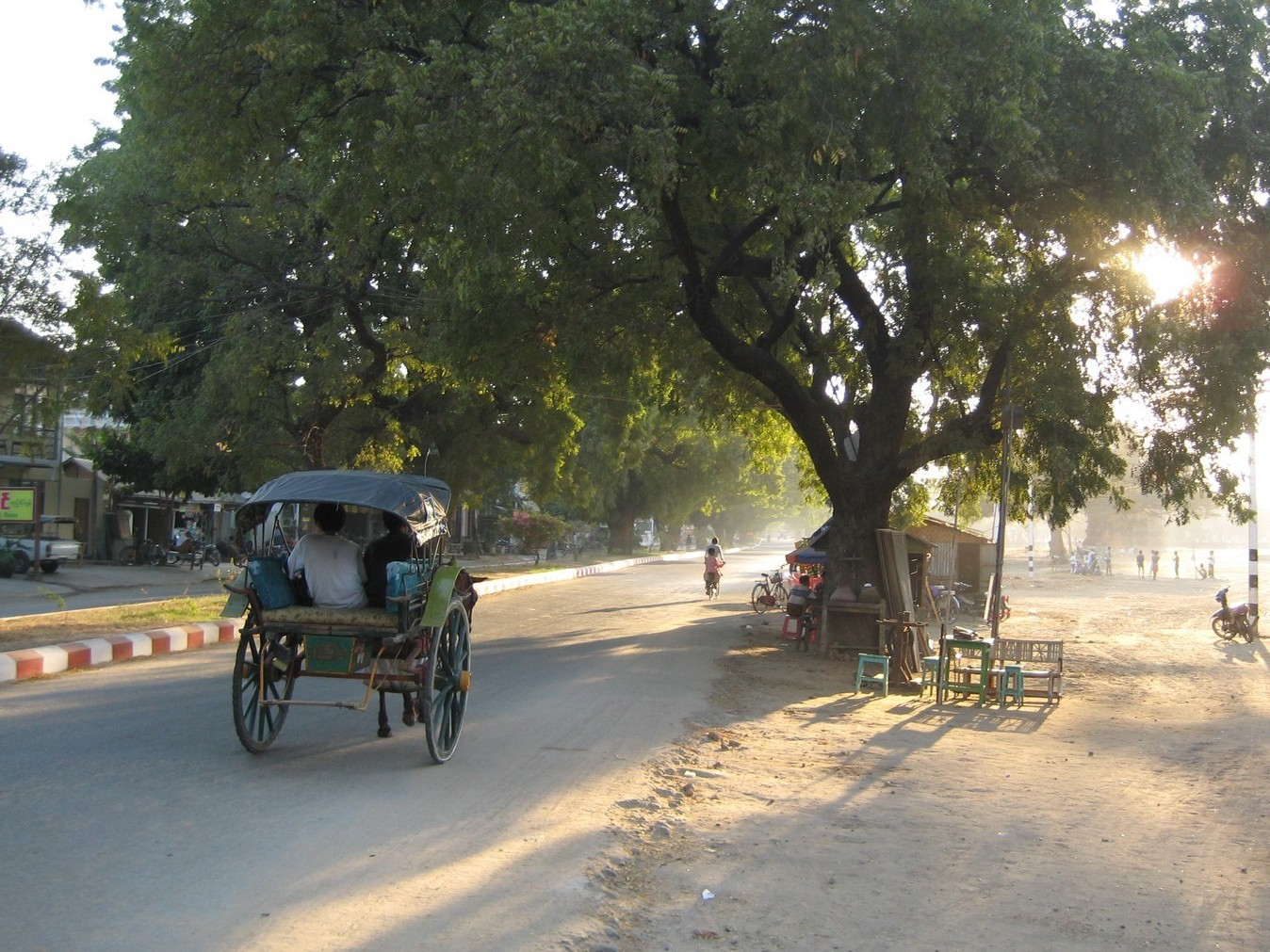

- Location in Nyaung U District (red colour)

- Location within Myanmar
- Coordinates: 21°16′N 95°27′E
- Country: Myanmar
- Region: Mandalay Region
- District: Nyaung-U District
- Capital: Nyaung-U
- Time zone: UTC+06:30 (MMT)

Nyaung-U Township is a township of Nyaung-U District in Mandalay Region of Myanmar. Its administrative town is Nyaung-U.
