= Natmauk Township =

Coordinates: 20.3500°N 95.4000°E

Natmauk Township နတ်မောတ်မြို့နယ်
- Township
- Location in Magway district
- Country: Myanmar
- Region: Magway Region
- District: Magway District
- Capital: Natmauk
- Time zone: UTC+6:30 (MMT)

Natmauk Township (Burmese: နတ်မောတ် မြို့နယ်) is a township of Magway District in the Magway Region of Myanmar. The principal town is Natmauk. It is the place where General Aung San who is national hero of Myanmar and father of Aung San Su Kyi, was born.
