= Nyaung-U District =

District of Mandalay Region, Myanmar

Coordinates: 21°05′N 95°02′E

Location in Mandalay Region

Nyaung-U is a district of Mandalay Region in central Myanmar.

== Townships ==
The district contains the following two townships:

- Kyaukpadaung Township
- Nyaung-U Township
