= Magway District =

District in Myanmar

Magway District မကွေးခရိုင်
- District
- location in Magway Region
- Coordinates: 19°40′27″N 97°12′34″E
- Country: Myanmar
- Region: Magway Region
- Seat: Magway
- Time zone: UTC6:30 (MMT)

Magway District (Burmese: မကွေးခရိုင်) is a district in eastern Magway Region (formerly Magway Division) in central Myanmar.

Magway may be divided into two portions: the low, flat country in the Taungdwingyi subdivision, and the undulating high ground extending over the rest of the district. In Taungdwingyi the soil is rich, loamy, and extremely fertile. The plain is about 72 kilometres (45 mi) from north to south. At its southern extremity it is about 48 kilometres (30 mi) wide, and lessens in width to the north till it ends in a point at Natmauk. On the east are the Pegu Yomas, which at some points reach a height of 460 metres (1,510 ft) A number of streams run westwards to the Irrawaddy, of which the Yin and the Pin, which form the northern boundary, are the chief. The only perennial stream is the Yanpè. Rice is the staple product, and considerable quantities are exported. Sesamum of very high quality, maize, and millet are also cultivated, as well as cotton in patches here and there over the whole district.

== Townships ==
The district contains the following townships:

- Magway Township
- Taungdwingyi Township
- Myothit Township
- Natmauk Township

Prior to 2022, the District also contained the two townships of Yenangyaung Township and Chauk Township, which were split off to form the new Chauk District.
