= Matriculation Examination (Myanmar) =

Academic Admission / Entrance Exams

Matriculation Examination တက္ကသိုလ်ဝင်စာမေးပွဲ
- Type: Paper-based standardized test
- Administrator: Department of Myanmar Examinations, Ministry of Education
- Skills tested: 6 subjects: 3 compulsory subjects: Myanmar, English, Mathematics; 3 elective subjects: for STEAMS 1: Chemistry, Physics, Biology; for STEAMS 2: Chemistry, Physics, Economics; for STAMS 1: Geography, History, Economics; for STAMS 2: Optional Myanmar, Economics, Social Science (Note: Geography and History)
- Purpose: Admission to undergraduate programs of public universities and colleges in Myanmar; Minimum requirement for most job opportunities in Myanmar
- Year started: 2024 (current system)
- Duration: 7 days
- Score range: 0-600 (0-100 for each subject)
- Offered: Once annually (in March)
- Regions: Myanmar
- Languages: Burmese, English
- Annual number of test takers: 255,228 (2026)
- Prerequisites: Final year of the national curriculum
- Qualification rate: 52.37% (2026)

The Matriculation Examination (Burmese: တက္ကသိုလ်ဝင်စာမေးပွဲ) is the annual nationally-coordinated examination for admission to higher education in Myanmar, eligible to those who have completed the final year of basic education. Not only the matriculation-year (Note: တက္ကသိုလ်ဝင်တန်း; Standard 10 (Grade 11) prior to 2023; Grade 12 since 2023) students of any school that uses the national curriculum but also independent self-learners can take the examination. It is administered in March every year. Test results not only determine the eligibility of high school students to pursue higher education — their entrance into universities and colleges as well as selection of specializations — but also their employment opportunities without advancing in education. The passing of this examination is the minimum qualification required by most jobs in Myanmar.

The official name of the examination was changed and reverted multiple times, and so was its system and subject combinations. It was reverted to "Matriculation Examination" for the last time in 1999. The first matriculation examination for current KG+12 system was held in March 2024.

== Historical names ==
On 9 October 1951, Ministry of Education promulgated the "Rules to Regulate the High School Final and Matriculation Examination", combining the two separate examinations — the High School Final Examination and the Matriculation Examination — into a single one, starting from 1951–1952 academic year. Since then, the official name of the examination has been changed and reverted throughout history as follow:

- 1952–1968: တက္ကသိုလ်ဝင်စာမေးပွဲ (lit. 'university entrance examination'): Matriculation Examination
- 1969–1980: အခြေခံပညာအထက်တန်းစာမေးပွဲ (lit. 'basic education high level examination'): Basic Education High School Examination
- 1981–1983: အခြေခံပညာအဆင့်မြင့်တန်းစာမေးပွဲ (lit. 'basic education advanced level examination')
- 1984–1998: အခြေခံပညာအထက်တန်းစာမေးပွဲ (lit. 'basic education high level examination'): Basic Education High School Examination
- 1999–present: တက္ကသိုလ်ဝင်စာမေးပွဲ (lit. 'university entrance examination'): Matriculation Examination

== Administration ==
The Matriculation Examination is administered by the Department of Myanmar Examinations, formerly known as the Board of Myanmar Examinations.

Each year, there are eleven question papers of equal format for Burmese states and regions. The system of eleven test papers per year was adopted in 2001-02 to prevent the leakage of some questions prior to the exam administration.

In Yangon, sales of alcohol are banned during matriculation exam administration.

Since 2015, there are only two questions papers making equal formats for the whole country (Local Question) and for those taking from overseas (Oversea Question).

== Registration ==
Students from government high schools and comprehensive schools can register for the examinations internally by the guidelines of school teachers, although students from private boarding schools have to register for the exams externally themselves. Students who attend international English-language schools or other private schools are not eligible to sit for the matriculation exam, nor are they allowed to enroll in Burmese universities.

Students nationwide take part in these exams annually, which take place in mid-March each year (for 9 days), with results released at testing sites throughout the country in June.

== Tested subjects and duration ==
Students are administered a combination of six papers depending on their choice. Myanmar, English, and Mathematics are compulsory whereas students can choose a combination of three elective subject from Mathematics, Chemistry, Physics, Biology, History, Geography, Economics, and Optional Myanmar.

The old Standard-10 system allowed students to combine the art and science subjects as they wanted, with the exception of Biology which had to be combined only with Physics and Chemistry, resulting up to 8 possible combinations starting in 2001–2002 academic year. Arts and science subjects could not be tested in parallel except Biology and Geography. Therefore, matriculation examination of the old system was 9-day long.

Current system of Grade-12 restricts the choice to only four combinations:

- STEAMS 1: Chemistry, Physics, Biology
- STEAMS 2: Chemistry, Physics, Economics
- STAMS 1: History, Physics, Geography
- STAMS 2: Optional Myanmar, Economics, Social Science (History+Geology)

With the arts and science subjects tested parallel, the matriculation examination of the new system lasts up to seven days, or only six days in years when no one takes STAMS 2.

== Exam scores ==
High marks in a subject garner a distinction known as gondu (ဂုဏ်ထူး). Students who achieve distinctions in four or more subjects are generally guaranteed placement in one of Myanmar's medical universities and senior engineering universities, the most selective of all universities in Myanmar. In recent years, the combined score of students who receive 4 subject distinctions has been around 480 out of 600. The scores of students at remote testing sites are announced via shortwave radio. Average exam scores and pass rates vary by region. In 2018, the highest pass rate was in Mandalay Region (38.17%), while the lowest pass rate was in Chin State.

Also, the Top 10 Students, known as The Whole Burma Top 10 (တစ်နိုင်ငံလုံးအတိုင်းအတာဖြင့် အမှတ်အများဆုံး ဆယ်ဦး), who scored the highest marks of all six subjects combined are announced each year corresponding to the sub-ordinate subjects taken. Out of 600 marks, the highest record-breaking marks achieved is 562 marks in 2016 and 2026. As the questions' difficulties vary for each year, there is no fixed marks in entering the Whole Burma Top 10 list. However, one can predict entering the list if around 550 marks is achieved.

Year	Student Name	Total Score	School / Institution	Location
2026	Ma Thiri Soe	562 / 600	CAE Private High School	Chanayethazan, Mandalay
2025	Mg Juu Thet Ko	547 / 600	No.1 Private High School	Saku, Magway
2024	Mg Min Khant Bo	557 / 600	EC Private High School	Tamwe, Yangon
2023	Mg Hein Wai Yan Htun	556 / 600	Family Private High School	Mahlaing, Mandalay
2022	Ma Eaint Hmue Khin	558 / 600	Basic Education High School 16 Mandalay	Chanayethazan, Mandalay
2020	Ma May Thet Htun	552 / 600	Basic Education High School 1 Dagon	Dagon, Yangon
2019	Mg Kyaw Lin Than	555 / 600	Basic Education High School 4 Ahlone	Ahlone, Yangon
2018	Ma Thin Mya Nway	553 / 600	Basic Education High School 1 Dagon	Dagon, Yangon
2017	Mg Thuta Ye Moe	555 / 600	Basic Education High School 2 Yankin	Yankin, Yangon
2016	Ma Htet Yamin Aung	562 / 600	Basic Education High School 2 Bahan	Bahan, Yangon
2015	Ma Ei Yadanar Naing	560 / 600	Practising High School, Yangon University of Education	Kamayut, Yangon
2014	Ma Thiri Htet Naing	558 / 600	Practising High School, Yangon Institute of Education	Kamayut, Yangon

== Statistics ==
Below are statistics regarding the number of test takers and annual pass rate by academic year. Examinations were cancelled in the 2020-21 academic year, due to COVID-19 related school closures. Since the 2021 Myanmar coup d'état, the number of test takers has declined precipitously due to political instability, and participation of student and teachers in the nationwide civil disobedience movement.

Academic year	Test takers	Pass rate
2006-07	TBD	36.76%
2007-08	TBD	29.63%
2008-09	TBD	30%
2009-10	TBD	TBD
2010-11	TBD	32.43%
2011-12	TBD	TBD
2012-13	TBD	35.12%
2013-14	541,946	31.67%
2014-15	597,950	37.60%
2015-16	636,237	29.92%
2016-17	716,190	33.89%
2017-18	789,845	32.82%
2018-19	851,570	31.44%
2019-20	910,229	32.06%
2020-21	Cancelled	Cancelled
2021-22	281,751	46.88%
2022-23	161,851	67.87%
2023-24	128,801	57.90%
2024-25	207,898	48.06%
2025-26	255,228	52.37%

== See also ==
- Education in Burma
