= Ministry of Education (Science and Technology) =

- ပညာရေးဝန်ကြီးဌာန (သိပ္ပံနှင့်နည်းပညာ)
- State seal of Myanmar

- Logo of Ministry of Education

Department overview
- Formed: April,2016
- Preceding Department: Ministry of Science and Technology
- Type: Department
- Jurisdiction: Government of Myanmar
- Headquarters: Nay Pyi Taw; 19.834349°N 96.122402°E
- Minister responsible: Myo Thein Gyi
- Parent department: Ministry of Education
- Website: moe-st.gov.mm

The Ministry of Science and Technology (Myanmar) was organized under the Ministry of Education (Myanmar) as the Ministry of Education (Science and Technology) ( Burmese: ပညာရေးဝန်ကြီးဌာန (သိပ္ပံနှင့်နည်းပညာ), abbreviated MOE-ST) in April 2016 by U Htin Kyaw's Government. The current responsible minister is Myo Thein Gyi.

There are 57 Universities, Colleges and Institutes under this organization.

== See also ==
List of Technological Universities in Myanmar
