= University of Foreign Languages =

University of Foreign Languages may refer to:

- Beijing Foreign Studies University, Beijing, China
- Beijing International Studies University, Beijing, China
- Beijing Language and Culture University, Beijing, China
- Dalian University of Foreign Languages, Dalian, China
- Guangdong University of Foreign Studies, Guangzhou, China
- Shanghai International Studies University, Shanghai, China
- Sichuan International Studies University, Chongqing, China
- Tianjin Foreign Studies University, Tianjin, China
- Xi'an International Studies University, Xi'an, China
- English and Foreign Languages University, Hyderabad, India
- Kanda University of International Studies, Chiba, Japan
- Kansai Gaidai University, Hirakata, Osaka, Japan
- Kobe City University of Foreign Studies, Kobe, Japan
- Kyoto University of Foreign Studies, Kyoto, Japan
- Nagasaki University of Foreign Studies, Nagasaki, Japan
- Nagoya University of Foreign Studies, Nagoya, Japan
- Tokyo University of Foreign Studies, Fuchū, Tokyo, Japan
- Pyongyang University of Foreign Studies, Pyongyang, North Korea
- Busan University of Foreign Studies, Busan, South Korea
- Hankuk University of Foreign Studies, Seoul, South Korea
- Mandalay University of Foreign Languages, Mandalay, Myanmar
- Yangon University of Foreign Languages, Yangon, Myanmar
- Wenzao Ursuline University of Languages, Kaohsiung, Taiwan
- Ho Chi Minh City University of Foreign Languages and Information Technology, Ho Chi Minh City, Vietnam
