= Education in Myanmar =

Ministry of Education
- Union Minister: Chaw Chaw Sein

National education budget (2014-15)
- Budget: ~US$1152 million

General details
- Primary languages: Burmese, English
- System type: National
- Established: 1910

Literacy (2014)
- Total: 89.5%
- Male: 92.6%
- Female: 86.9%

Enrollment (2014)
- Total: 17,606,223
- Primary: 4,766,806
- Secondary: 6,194,851
- Post secondary: 4,831,624

The educational system of Myanmar (also known as Burma) is operated by the Ministry of Education. Universities and professional institutes from Upper Burma and Lower Burma are run by two separate entities, each called the Department of Higher Education, with their headquarters in Yangon and Mandalay, respectively. The modern education system is based on the system implemented during British rule in Burma. The first government-run high school was founded by the British colonial administration in 1874. Two years later, this Government High School was upgraded as University College, Rangoon. Nearly all schools are government-operated, but recently, there has been an increase in privately funded schools (which specialise in English). In Myanmar, schooling is compulsory until the end of elementary school, about nine to ten years old. However, the international standard for schooling is 15 to 16 years old.

The literacy rate of Myanmar, according to the 2014 Myanmar Census stands at 89.5% (males: 92.6%, females: 86.9%). The annual budget allocated to education by the government is low; only about 1.2% is spent per year on education. English is taught as a second language from kindergarten. As of 2026, Myanmar's enrollment rate has dropped significantly, with only about half of school-age children attending school. With inflation and internal conflict, over 6 million children are not in school.

In pre-colonial Burma, the Sangha was the primary educational institution, was a widespread system of decentralised and local monastic schools, supported economically by local residents and politically by the king. Beginning in the mid-nineteenth century, there were also mission schools established by Catholic and Protestant orders, particularly in highland areas.

Most of the early British mission schools were established after 1860 (such as La Salle schools) in Myanmar were nationalised on 1 April 1965 after the order restoration of general Ne Win.

The Human Rights Measurement Initiative (HRMI) finds that Myanmar is fulfilling only 84.3% of what it should be fulfilling for the right to education based on the country's level of income. HRMI breaks down the right to education by looking at the rights to both primary education and secondary education. While taking into consideration Myanmar's income level, the nation is achieving 96.7% of what should be possible based on its resources (income) for primary education but only 71.9% for secondary education.

== History ==
=== Pre-colonial era ===
In pre-colonial Burma, the Sangha was the primary educational institution. The Burmese word for school, kyaung, is synonymous with the word for monastery from this connection. In dynastic Burma, one of the main Buddhist obligations of the king was to provide welfare to the people. The schools were independent from the government, often supported by local donations to the monastery. The state, however, had a vital interest in its development as the presence of monks providing educational welfare provided important political legitimacy. Boys were educated part-time or full time as novices within the monastic system, focused mostly on religious scripture- which led girls to be educated at home, gaining basic literacy skills and other home or marketplace skills.

=== British colonial rule ===
When the British conquered Burma, they encountered this extensive system but dismissed it as inadequate and unsuitable for the modern era. During colonial rule, the British sought to create secular education, tremendously increasing educational access for women. The number of female students enrolled in school rose 61% (by 45,000 students) from 1911 to 1921, and another 82% (100,000 students) from 1921 to 1931 with expansion of the colonial and private education system, primarily in the form of all-girls schools. This was mirrored by an increase in female employment. From 1921 to 1931, there was a 33% increase in employment of women in public administration, law, medicine (96% increase), education (64% increase), and journalism sectors. Missionaries also started schools with used the Karen and other languages as the mode of instruction.

=== Post-independence era ===
When Burma gained independence on 4 January 1948, the government sought to create a literate and educated population, and Burma was believed to be on its way to become the first Asian Tiger in the region. However, 1962 coup d'état isolated and impoverished Burma. All schools were nationalised, and placed under the control of the Ministry of Education which replaced ethnic schools teachers with Burmese speaking teachers. As a result many of the Karen, Kachin, Shan, and other minority language schools began to fail. Burmese also replaced English as the medium of instruction at Burmese universities in 1965, with the passing of the New University Education Law a year earlier. This led to a rapid decline in English proficiency among the Burmese. English was reintroduced as a medium of instruction in 1982. In 1977, the two year regional college system was introduced by the Burmese government, as a way to disperse college students until they were about to graduate (the third and fourth years were spent at a traditional university), a system that was ended in 1981.

Due to the student protests of the 8888 Uprising, all universities were closed in Burma for 2 years. During the 1990s, the newly introduced structure perpetuated a weak education system as the government's response to the crises was to introduce one 6-month term for each academic year. The SPDC government arranged irregular commencement dates for universities and colleges, but, students were still participated in clashes with the government. Another series of student strikes in 1996 and 1998 resulted in a further three years of closure.

After the re-opening of universities and colleges in 1999, the government scattered universities in different regions. The relocation of certain universities were made under relative ministries. The new system reduced university degrees by one year, providing a bachelor's degree for just three-year course. However, improvements were rapidly made despite the early disturbances. In 2005, the Ministry of Foreign Affairs officially announced that Burmese education was reaching international standards and the government had fully accredited 156 universities and colleges in Myanmar.

Back then, Myanmar lagged far behind in terms of educational standards. Learn-by-rote education, poorly trained teachers, bribery, as well as use of out-dated resources had been the trademarks of primary and secondary schools of Myanmar. Furthermore, students were obliged to follow onerous after-school tuition, mostly because learning at school was not considered enough. Students learnt everything by heart, from answers of English grammar questions to essays. Sometimes, all questions asked in tests were given in advance. Exceptionally, some Standard 4, Standard 8 and Standard 10 test answers were unseen unless the test papers are stolen. Many universities had been built and scattered throughout cities to prevent students participation in potential unrest.

Besides these actions, students attending these universities were not allowed to speak freely, to write freely or to publish freely.

=== Post-coup era ===
Following the 2021 Myanmar coup d'état, military junta policies targeting participants in the civil disobedience movement (CDM) have crippled healthcare and education. Qualified teachers and doctors have been dismissed or detained, with underqualified replacements filling gaps. Efforts by resistance groups to provide parallel education are hampered by military bombings and infrastructure issues.

== Uniform ==
School uniforms are mandatory throughout public schools in Burma, from kindergarten until the 12th Grade The current uniform rule, known as the "White and Green" by colours, was mandated on 14 February 1966. From kindergarten to the 5th Grade, the compulsory uniform for boys is a white shirt and green pants, which can be short or long. Shoes or Burmese sandals may be worn. The uniform for girls is similar, consisting of a white blouse and a skirt or pants. From the 5th standard until matriculation, traditional Burmese attire is considered appropriate school uniform. The uniform for boys is a white shirt (with an English collar or a mandarin collar) and a green sarong called a pahso, along with Burmese sandals. For girls, a traditional Burmese blouse (either the yinzi, with a front opening, or the yin hpon, with a side opening) and a green sarong called a htamein are worn, along with Burmese sandals.

Public school teachers are also required to wear the traditional uniform in a similar way as the students.

Nowadays, private and international schools usually use their own colours for their uniforms. The most widely used one is a white shirt with the school logo, and navy blue pants or a skirt.

== KG+10 system (1982-2016) ==
Level: Standard (Grade) (Note: Prior to 1998, The term "standard" was used in English with the same number as in Burmese. The term "grade" was introduced in 1998 to be used in English alongside the standard in Burmese, with the number of grade greater than that of the standard in Burmese due to the designation of Kindergarten as Grade-1.)	Typical age	
Preschool
Pre-kindergarten	3–4	
Primary school
Kindergarten (Grade 1)	5–6	
Standard 1 (Grade 2)	6–7	
Standard 2 (Grade 3)	7–8	
Standard 3 (Grade 4)	8–9	
Standard 4 (Grade 5)	9–10	
Middle school
Standard 5 (Grade 6)	10–11	
Standard 6 (Grade 7)	11–12	
Standard 7 (Grade 8)	12–13	
Standard 8 (Grade 9)	13–14	
High school
Standard 9 (Grade 10)	14–15	
Standard 10 (Grade 11)	15–16	
Post-secondary education
University / College	(1982–2010)	(2010–2020) (Note: Universities and colleges were closed for two years from 2020 to 2022)
Undergraduate education
Diploma B.Sc./B.A. B.Ed./LL.B. B.E./B.Arch. M.B.B.S.	16 + 1–3 16 + 3 16 + 4 16 + 5 16 + 6	16 + 1–3 16 + 4 16 + 5 16 + 6 16 + 7
Postgraduate education
PG.Dip. M.Sc./M.A. M.Ed. LL.M. M.E./M.Arch. M.Med.Sc. Ph.D.	(Note: ages vary depending on degrees)+ 1–3 19 + 2 22 (Note: M.Ed. entrance requires two years of service in government departments) + 2 20 + 2 21 + 2 22 + 2/3 + 3	+ 1–3 20 + 2 23 + 2 21 + 2 22 + 2 23 + 2/3 + 3
Vocational education	Ages vary	
Adult education

In the old system, the basic education had KG+10 system divided into three levels: primary school level (KG to Standard 4), middle school level (Standard 5 to Standard 8), and high school level (Standard 9 and 10), typically starting at the age of 5 and concluding at the age of 15.

In 1998, Kindergarten was designated as Grade 1 and Standard 10 became the equivalent of Grade 11, making the academic standard in Myanmar one year ahead of the internationally accepted age norm. From then on, the "grade" in English was used along side the "standard" (တန်း) in Burmese with a difference in number. The old system did not have Grade 12. Students of Grade 11 took the Matriculation Examination which is held every year in March at the end of the school year. Thus, students entered universities and colleges typically at the age of 16 and were able to receive a degree at as young as the age of 19.

Prior to 2021, public schools were not under a single Department of Basic Education. The practising schools attached to universities and colleges were not under the departments of basic education but administered by the attached institutions under their respective departments since 1 October 1981. Department of Basic Education and Department of Higher Education were restructured into 3 and 2 separate departments respectively on 1 April 1998. As of 2013, Department of Basic Education No. 1 administered schools in Lower Myanmar excluding Yangon Region, Department of Basic Education No. 2 administered schools in Upper Myanmar, Department of Basic Education No. 3 administered schools in Yangon Region, Department of Educational Planing and Training administered the practising schools attached to education colleges, Department of Higher Education (Lower Myanmar) administered the Practising School attached to Yangon Institute of Education. In June 2014, Shwe Min Wun Basic Education Middle School was upgraded to Shwe Min Wun Practising High School and attached to Sagaing Institute of Education which was under the Department of Higher Education (Upper Myanmar). The three DBEs were unified into Department of Basic Education and the two DHEs into Department of Higher Education on 1 April 2015. With the transfer of education colleges, all practising schools came under the Department of Higher Education until they were eventually transferred to Department of Basic Education.

=== Preschool ===
Preschools were opened for children over 2 years of age and they are in extensive care or public systems.

=== Primary education ===
Primary education was officially compulsory. It lasted five years, and to continue onto secondary school, students needed to pass a comprehensive examination on basic subjects. Kindergarten started from the age of 5 (not younger than 4 years and 8 months at the time of school's commencement date). Unlike the international systems and the new curriculum system, the old curriculum system had actual teaching and learning started in KG.

=== Secondary education ===
Secondary schools were usually combined, containing both middle and high schools. Big schools usually had separate buildings for each level of education, while smaller ones usually combined them into one building. Secondary Middle schools offered classes from Standard 5 to Standard 8 whereas Secondary High school offered classes up to Standard 10. Children of rich and well-known families were often given easier access to the more prestigious secondary schools. There was much corruption in educational equality, but in both primary and secondary schools, the system was almost "no-failure education system". Only at the end of high school did the system changed because of the Matriculation Examination.

High schools students chose one of 7 tracks, most of the time only one of three, upon entering high school, multiple combinations of three additional elective subjects. All high school students took Burmese, English, and mathematics. However, Science-specialised students also took 3 additional subjects: chemistry, physics, and based on their track, biology, economics, geography, or history as part of their coursework, while arts-specialised students took geography, history, and based on their track, economics, biology, or chemistry. These routes also determined what matriculation subject exams they are administered and what tertiary schools they can apply to.

At the end of Standard 10, students took the Matriculation Examination administered by the Board of Examinations annually in mid-March. High marks in a subject garnered a distinction known as gondu (ဂုဏ်ထူး). Students who achieved distinctions in four or more subjects (or a combined total of approximately /600) were generally guaranteed placement in one of Myanmar's medical universities and senior engineering universities, the most selective of universities in Myanmar. Test score results were released at testing sites throughout the country in June. Since 2007, Mon State has had the highest matriculation pass rates in the country.

Students who attended international English-language schools or other private schools were, and still are, typically not eligible to sit for the matriculation exam, nor were they allowed to enroll in Burmese universities. Instead, they typically studied overseas, at destinations such as Singapore, Malaysia, Australia, United Kingdom and the United States. In 2010, 695 Burmese international students studied in the United States, particularly in private liberal arts colleges.

=== Tertiary education ===
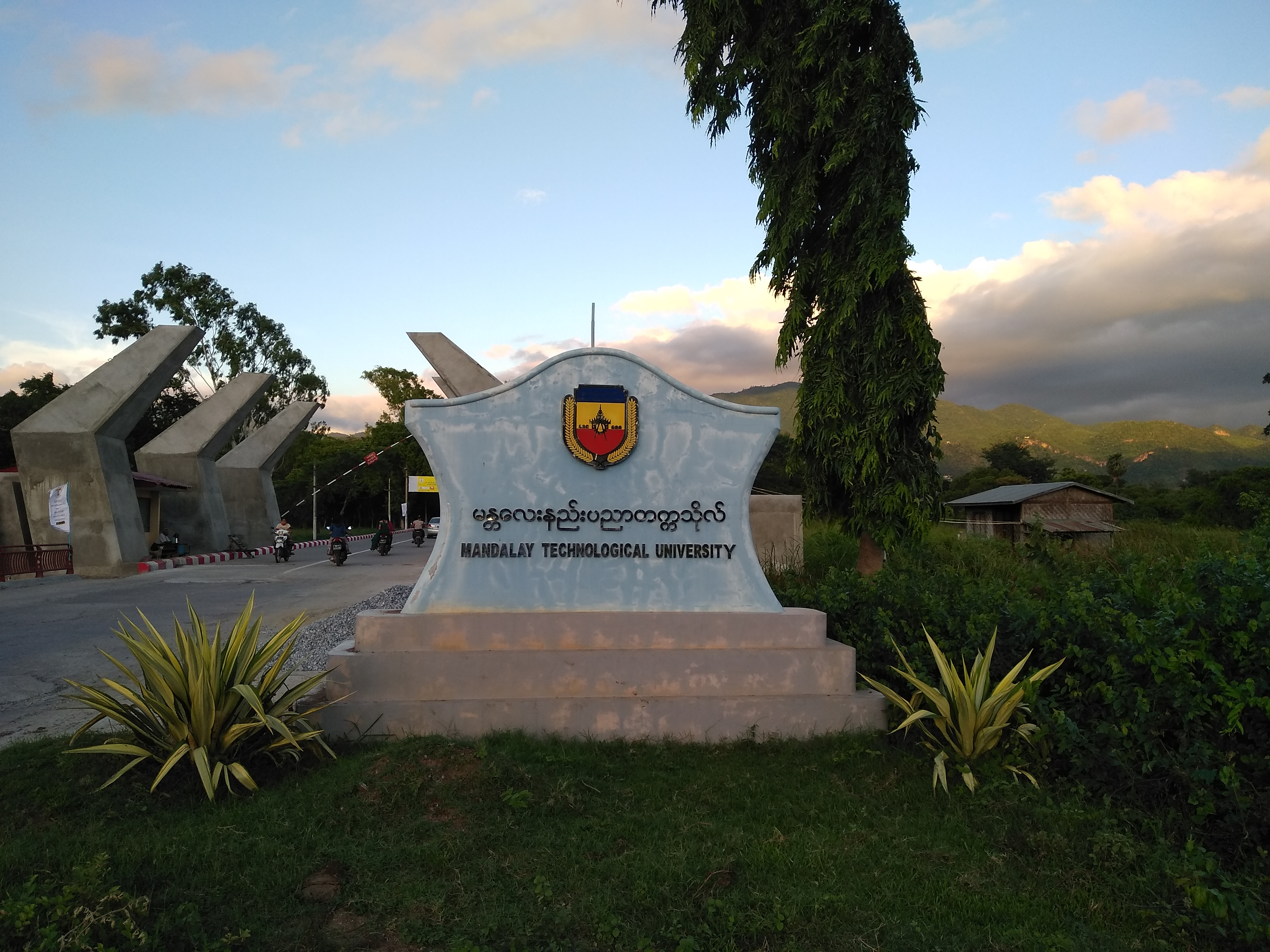
Mandalay Technological University

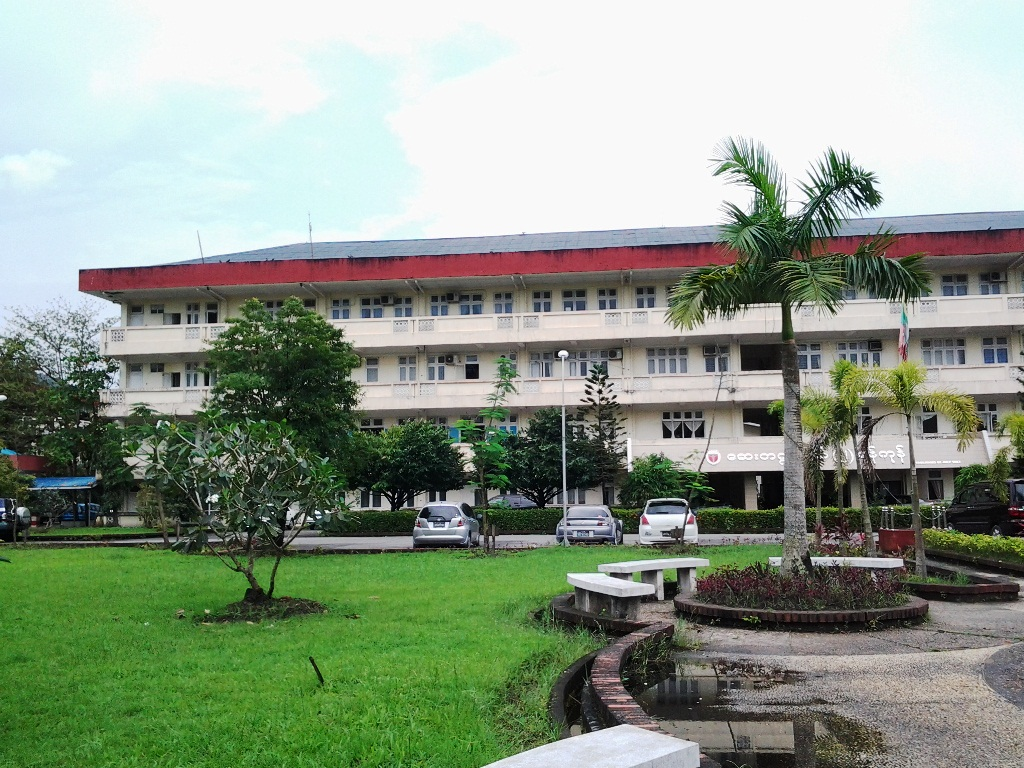
Yangon University of Medicine 2

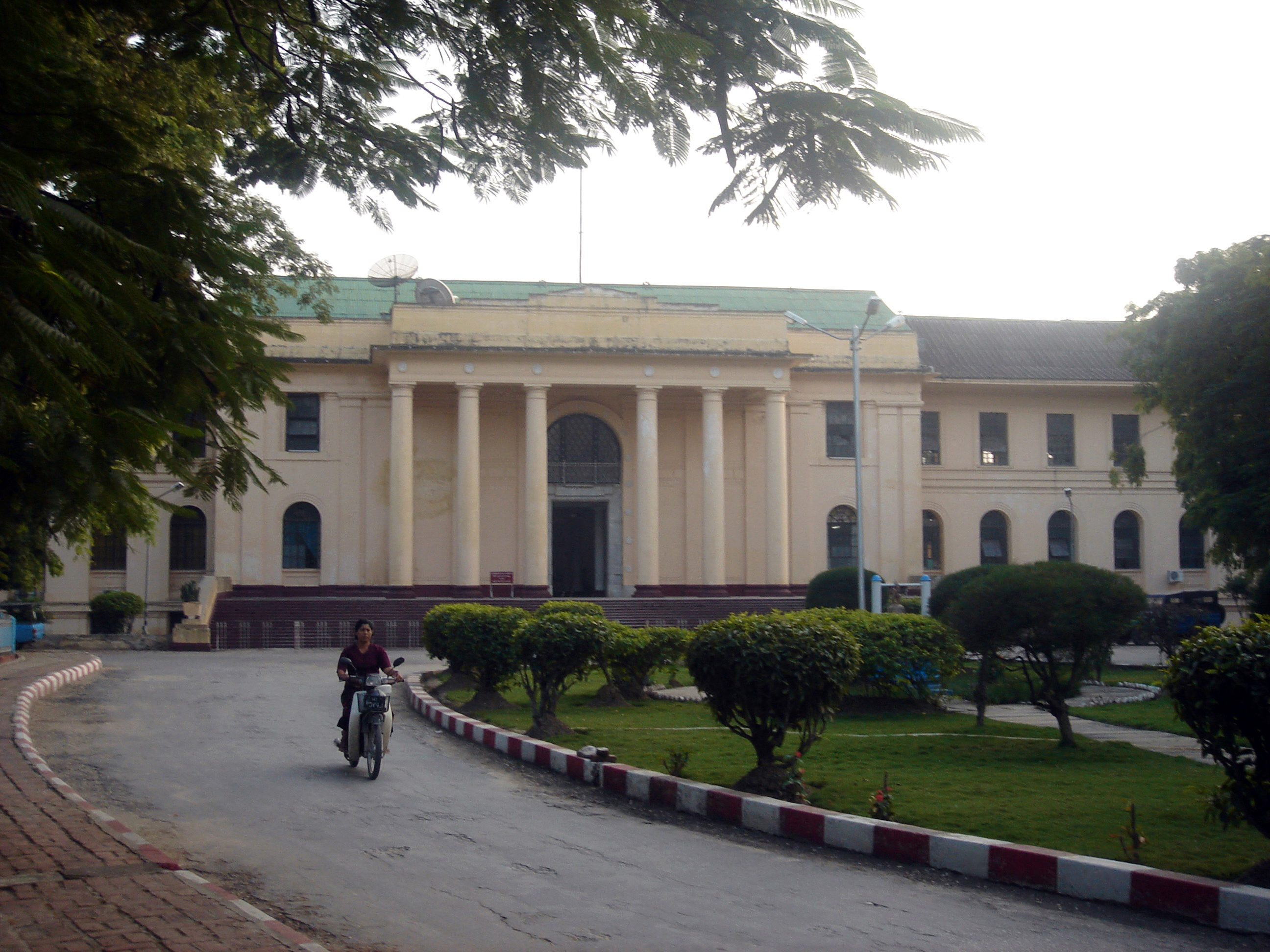
University of Mandalay

Higher education in Myanmar has experienced a large expansion since 1988, although the country ranks as one of the lowest globally for universities. Due to the student protests in the 8888 uprising, the Myanmar government closed down all universities for two years. Additional student protests in 1996 and 1998 caused all universities to be closed for another three years.

The Ministry of Education administers most higher education in Myanmar. The Ministry of Education implements short and long term education development plans to improve the quality, access, and diversity of higher education. The government envisions higher education as an avenue for empowering people to make educated decisions and capitalize on economic opportunities within Myanmar, and therefore, foresees investment in education as a fruitful investment for the people of Myanmar.

== KG+12 system (2016-present) ==
Level: Standard = Grade	Typical age
Preschool
Preschool	4
Primary school
Kindergarten	5–6
Grade 1	6–7
Grade 2	7–8
Grade 3	8–9
Grade 4	9–10
Grade 5	10–11
Middle school
Grade 6	11–12
Grade 7	12–13
Grade 8	13–14
Grade 9	14–15
High school
Grade 10	15–16
Grade 11	16–17
Grade 12	17–18
Post-secondary education
University / College	Since 2022
Undergraduate education
Diploma B.Sc./B.A. B.Ed./LL.B. B.E./B.Arch. M.B.B.S.	18 + 1–3 18 + 3 18 + 4 18 + 5 18 + 6
Postgraduate education
PG.Dip. M.Sc./M.A. M.Ed. LL.M. M.E./M.Arch. M.Med.Sc. Ph.D.	+ 1–3 21 + 2 24 + 2 22 + 2 23 + 2 24 + 2/3 + 3
Vocational education	Ages vary
Adult education

In the 2010s, the government partnered up with JICA to introduce a new curriculum for students. In the 2016-2017 academic year, they announced the new curriculum for kindergarten, then did the same for the following grades until the 2023-2024, when Grade 12 was added.

Primary, Middle, and High Schools in Myanmar are under the Department of Basic Education. The official commencement date for those schools is the first weekday of June.

Previously, schools were based on rote memorisation, but now, education is based on the 5 C's in education: Critical thinking, Creativity and Innovation, Communication, Collaboration, and Citizenship. Non examined subjects are based on this formative assessment layout.

Each education level is separated into Upper and Lower for division of difficulty. Lower level grades grade students with A (Advanced Level), S (Satisfactory Level), and E (Emerging Level). They are graded with formative assessment. In Upper levels, examined subjects are graded in

- A - Very good (အလွန်ကောင်း) (80-100)
- B - Good (ကောင်း) (60-79)
- C - Average (သာမန်) (40-59)
- D - Needs to improve (ထပ်မံကြိုးစားရန်လို) (<40, failing grade)

These are graded with summative assessment. Non examined subjects are still graded with A, S, and E.

To complete a level of education, students will have to go to another school to sit through their respective education level's Completion Examinations. Back then, the students' assigned school could've been their own school.

In some areas of the country, the student may also learn their own Local Curriculum subject, with it being taught in the region's main language. Just like the Bamar learning Burmese at school, the students also have to learn their regional language.

Prior to the 2026-27 academic year, teachers in Grades 1-12 would add marks to a student who failed their school finals to make them pass, but in the 2026-27 academic year onwards, Grade 5, 9, 11, and 12 teachers will not have the permission to do so and will not give the student a pass as long as a student has a grade below 40 in a subject in any of the said grades.

=== Preschool ===
Preschools are opened for children 4 years of age and they are in extensive care or public systems.

=== Primary Education ===
Kindergarten children are usually over the age of 5 by the time the academic year starts. Kindergarten in Myanmar is part of Primary school.

After graduating kindergarten, students enter Grade 1. Starting from there, they learn ten subjects: Burmese, English, Mathematics, Science, Social Studies (Geography, Economics, and History), Morality and Civics, Life Skills, Visual Arts, Performing Arts (music and dance), and P.E., all (except English) taught in, the mother tongue, Burmese. Primary school education is further divided into Lower (KG-G3) and Upper Primary school (G4-G5). This division is only for the sake of difficulty in the subjects taught, and not for the schools themselves.

Lower primary school usually focuses on fun and easy education, whereas Upper primary school is a more of a transition stage between Primary school and Middle school, with much more complex topics.

Of the ten subjects, only half have examinations, Burmese, English, Maths, Science, and Social Studies. Sometimes, a subject's exam paper may have two parts, Part (A) and (B) (or in Burmese, အပိုင်း (က) and အပိုင်း (ခ)). Students take quarterly exams: one in July, one in October, one in December, and one in February. The exams in October and February are the students midterms and finals respectively. Therefore, the exams are much harder and longer to finish. Schools usually either have a subject a day, or two subjects a day. If a school were to choose for 2 examinations to happen on the same day, either Maths or Social Studies get their own day. Sometimes, a school (mainly private schools) may choose to start the exams on a Thursday to ensure 2 days of rest before taking the Maths exam. The quarterly exams are all 25-mark exams until Grade 5. Then, the midterms and finals will be 50 mark and 100 mark exams respectively.

To attend middle school, one must pass their Grade 5 school finals, and also the Primary School Completion Examinations. The exams are one subject per day, 5 days, annually. The exam is a 100-mark exam lasting an hour and 30 minutes. Each district has different exam papers.

=== Upper Education ===
==== Middle school ====
After graduating Primary school, a student needs to attend Middle school. Previously, middle school had one mandatory track, but starting from the 2026-2027 academic year onwards, students may choose to learn the original track or the newIndustrial-Agriculture-Livestock Breeding track (colloquially စက်စိုက်မွေး). They learn Basic Industrial Education, Basic Agricultural Education, and Basic Livestock Education.

In the original track, students learn 12 subjects, Burmese, English, Math. 1 (algebra, arithmetic, etc), Math 2 (geometry), Geography, History, Science, Morality and Civics, Life Skills, Visual Arts, Performing Arts, and P.E. The စက်စိုက်မွေး students learn the three subjects alongside the other twelve subjects. In exams, Math 1 and Math 2 are usually examined in the same day and on the same test paper. They also start to get 6 day exams. There are also Lower (G6-G7), and Upper (G8-G9) Middle Education.

To attend high school, they must finish and pass the school finals of Grade 9, as well as sit and pass in the Middle School Completion Examinations. annually tested alongside the Primary School Completion Examinations. The exam takes 6 days, one subject per day. Each exam is a 100 mark exam lasting 2 hours. Each region and state has different exam papers.

==== High school ====
After graduating Grade 9, students are free to choose one of three types of high schools, normal government high schools, Government+Vocational High Schools (စက်၊စိုက်၊မွေး အထက်တန်း‌ကျောင်း) and Government Technological High Schools (GTHS).

Normal high students choose one of 4 tracks upon entering high school, the most widely chosen being the two science tracks. All high school students across every type of school take Burmese, English, and Mathematics, however, Science-specialisation students also take 3 additional subjects: Chemistry, Physics, and based on their track, Biology or Economics as part of their coursework, while arts-specialisation students take Geography, History and Economics. Another arts track is Burmese, English, Mathematics, Economics, Optional Burmese, Social Science (Geography and History), and Science (Chemistry, Physics, Biology), but this track is rarely chosen. These routes also determine what matriculation subject exams they are administered and what universities they can apply to. The four tracks also have a general subject for the opposite track, Science for the arts tracks, and Social Science for the science tracks. Morality and Civics, Life Skills, Visual Arts, Performing Arts, and P.E. are also taught in Grade 10 and 11 (Lower High School), but in Grade 12 (Upper High School), they are not taught.

To attend universities, they must first attend and pass their school finals in Grade 12, and then sit through and pass the University Entrance Examination held annually in mid March. The exam is a high stakes 100-mark exam lasting three hours for each exam. The whole country has the same exam papers. High marks in a subject garner a distinction known as gondu (ဂုဏ်ထူး). Students who achieve distinctions in four subjects (at least 385/600) and students who garner a distinction in six (at least 465/600) are generally guaranteed placement in senior engineering universities and medical universities, the most selective of universities in Myanmar. To get into a medical university, you must have a sum of around 240 marks in English, Chemistry, and Biology. Test score results are released at testing sites throughout the country in mid June. In the 2025-2026 Academic Year's matriculation, the pass rate was 52.37% with West Bago Region getting the highest pass rate of 59.6% and Chin State getting the lowest with 19.1% in the whole country. Outside of Myanmar, the foreign pass rate was 87.5%. The top 1 student in the Biology Science track in the entirety of Burma was Ma Thiri Soe from Mandalay who got 562 marks out of 600. She shares her score with the first person to ever get a 562, 10th Grader Ma Htet Yamin Aung from B.E.H.S (2) Bahan in 2016. They both got the highest marks in the history of Myanmar.

==== Vocational Schools and Government Technological High Schools ====
Vocational Schools teach Industrial work, Agriculture, and Livestock breeding. Some schools share their campus with a normal government high school. There is one vocational school per township.The Industrial track is further divided into Civil Engineering, Electrical Engineering, and Machining Technology. Every field learns Burmese, with subjects that correlate to what they should learn in the field. The Industrial field is the only field that teaches English and Maths. They also get their own matriculation exams, with the pass rate for the 2025-2026 academic year being 49.7%, with Shan State getting the highest pass rate with 66.17% and Kayah State having the lowest with 30.77%. The person who achieved the highest marks was Ma Phyo Yadanar Aung from Pyawbwe with 612 marks and 6 distinctions.

Government Technological High Schools teach 8 fields of Industrial work, such as electrical engineering, refrigeration technology, and machining technology.

Students of these schools get a monthly stipend of 10,000 MMK (approximately US$2.14 – US$4.75).

=== Tertiary Education ===
==== Universities and colleges ====
When a student passes both the Grade 12 and matriculation exam, they can attend either a generalist or specialized university. Based on their marks and amount of distinctions, they can choose their majors in these universities. Generalist universities can accept any student regardless of their marks and distinctions, but specialized universities are much more strict when you choose undergraduate majors. To attend one of the engineering or medical universities, you typically need at least five to six distinctions or 480+ marks to even attend the university. Every year, the majors redefine the mark boundary where a student can attend the major. Medical and technological universities usually have their mark boundaries at around 500 marks. Prestigious specialized universities usually only allow ten postgraduates a year, give or take.

If a student passes the Grade 12 exam but not the matriculation exam, they will still need to repeat the grade and take the matriculation exam again.

== Private education ==
In the early 2000s, civil society and private classes attempted to fill in the inadequacies of the public school system. In 2011, during the 2011-2015 reforms, private schools were legalised, with 46 private schools establishing themselves over the decade in Yangon, Mandalay and Pyin Oo Lwin.

Today, private and international schools are one of the only opportunities for students to study abroad and get high paying jobs.

=== Rules and standards for schools ===
In October 2026, the Ministry of Education announced 44 new directives for private schools in Myanmar to abide to.

The new directives include rules regarding schools' location, environment, and campus. They also include requirements for new private schools that wish to open. These state the items and permissions that a school will need to open. Some of the rules are as follows:

- Private schools must be built as separate buildings.
- Private schools must be 1,000 yards (roughly 0.6 mi or 0.9 km) away from a government school or another private school.
- Private schools may not be opened on the same road as a government school.
- Private schools may not have the layout of a residential building.
- Private schools must have drills in place for natural disasters and fires.

Schools must also meet room and size requirements.

- Primary schools must be 3-5 acres, middle schools 5-7 acres, and high schools 7-10 acres.
- Assembly halls and Playgrounds/Sports Areas must be outdoors.
- A school's assembly hall must have 7 ft² (0.65 m²) of space per student and fit at least half of the student body.
- A Sports Area must have at least 15 ft² (1.39 m²) of space per student. The length and width of the Sports Area must be according to the type of sport played in it.
- Primary School classrooms must have at least 12 ft² (1.11 m²) of space per student. Teachers must have 75 ft² (6.9 m²) of teaching space.
- Middle School classrooms and High School classrooms must have at least 18 ft² (1.67 m²) of space per student. Teachers must have 80 ft² (7.43 m²) of teaching space. The classroom's width must be at least 20 ft (6.1 m)
- A school must have an Assembly Hall, a Sports Area, a Multipurpose Hall, an ICT Room, a library that fits the education level of the school, laboratories for Physics, Chemistry, and Biology experiments with complete equipment, Home Economics, Soft Skills, Visual Arts, and Performing Arts rooms, an Admin Office, a Teachers' Lounge, a Drop-off Zone, a First Aid Room, and a shop or canteen. Laboratories must have a width of at least 20 ft.
- Private schools are to have one toilet for every 30 students.
- Classrooms must have enough furniture and equipment for students.

Schools must be clean and have a good layout. They must also have a flagpole in front of the school, a classroom amount that fits the education level and student body of the school, classrooms with enough light and ventilation, and clean water. There must not be more than 40 students in a single classroom.

Any private school that does not follow the rules above will not have permission to renew their licenses and will have to be closed in the 2027-2028 academic year. For now, the government has given schools a one year grace period to prepare.

== See also ==
- Myanmar National Education Law 2014
