= Myanmar National Education Law 2014 =

Law in Myanmar

National Education Law 2014

Pyidaungsu Hluttaw
- Enacted by: Thein Sein
- Enacted: 30 September 2014
- Status: Current legislation

Myanmar National Education Law (Burmese: အမျိုးသားပညာရေး ဥပဒေ), enacted on 30 September 2014, is designed to reform the country's outdated education system. Drafted in March 2014, the bill was passed after being sent back to the floor by President Thein Sein with 25 proposed changes, 19 of which were accepted. From the beginning of its drafting process, the law faced criticism from students and teachers unions as well as various civil society groups. Concerns over the law later turned into protests, which were eventually cracked down by the government.

== National Education Law 2014 ==
Section 1 includes definition of terms used in the law.

As laid out in Section 2, the main objectives of the law are to train students to become critical thinkers; to nurture students to become law-abiding citizens with democratic principles; to enable students to become citizens who could pass down their ethnic languages, traditions, literature and to value historical heritage and environmental sustainability; to enhance human resources in preparation for economic development and higher standards of living; to provide a learning environment that is up to date with international standards and to improve teaching, learning and research by using technology information and communication information; to help students excel in their own fields of interest; and to promote sportsmanship and school health projects.

Section 3 of the law covers the fundamental policies of the law that include providing education for students with disabilities; providing education relevant to the lives of the students; and granting autonomy of colleges and universities.

Section 4 outlines the formation of National Education Commission that will consist of ministers from related sectors, experts from nationality groups and relevant individuals. The duties of the committee include providing guidelines on implementation of the objectives and the policies of the law; setting policies to ensure the quality of education; working with the government and local administration to get funding for the education sector; making policies regarding shutting down or opening of domestic as well as international schools; and working with relevant departments and ministries on short-term and long-term educational goals. Article 7 of the Section 4 also states that the commission should not interfere with the management of institutions of higher education but only assist with policy-related issues for their development.

Section 5 states that public education will be divided into primary education, vocational education and higher education. The section also talks about formal and informal education as well as self-learning education.

Section 6 covers the different types of schools that include public schools, private schools, monastic schools, volunteer schools, regional schools, government-funded schools, special schools and emergency mobile schools.

Section 7 is about curriculum and it states that National Education Commission has to ensure curriculums used in the country have boundaries and standards and guarantee autonomy of curriculum formations if it meets these standards. Ministry of Education will set the standards of National Education Curriculum with approval from the commission. Schools can teach in either Burmese or English or both languages and if necessary, an ethnic language and Burmese can be used in primary education. It also mentions that in States and Regions, ethnic language and literature program can be implemented through state and regional governments starting from elementary level and upgraded step by step.

Section 8 details educational duties and benefits and explain the roles of parent(s) or guardian(s) and local and regional administration.

Section 9 focuses on requirements for and quality of teachers.

Section 10 covers monitoring and accessing the education quality and states that in every level of education there must be a quality assessment scheme.

Section 11 is on management and administrative duties of education. In Article 56 (a), it states the Ministry of Education, relevant ministries and Higher Education Committee will work together to manage related institutions of higher education based on this law and existing laws.

Section 12 covers budget and Section 13, Article 66 states that existing schools before the implementation of the law must operate according to the law by five years of its enactment. Section 14 covers more general issues including that the law does not govern schools that only teach religion.

== Background ==
In March 2014, Education Promotion and Implementation Committee (EPIC) drafted the National Education Bill, which went through both houses of Hluttaw on July 30, 2014. While the bill was waiting for the approval from President, students and teachers unions as well as the civil society groups raised concerns over whether the bill was drafted democratically. They claimed that even though the government held meetings to seek advice from the public, it ignored their recommendations. Thein Sein sent back the bill to the parliament with some 25 proposed changes. On September 26, the parliament accepted 19 of the proposed changes but denied 6 one of which is to delay the full implementation of the law to 2027 and it became enacted on September 30. The next step is for Hluttaw to pass by-laws in the coming months to supplement the enacted law.

== Controversy ==
Opponents of the law claimed that the government didn't seek advice from the students adequately. They were also unsatisfied that minority ethnic languages would not be taught at institutes of higher education. They also stated that under the new law, universities would not be independent from Ministry of Education and most of all, they point out that the law will not recognize the formation of student and teacher unions.

On the other hand, members of Hluttaw responded that institutions of higher education would remain independent from central control. Khin Maung Yi, the secretary of the Joint Bill Committee, asserted that universities would have autonomy over creating their own policies. He also accused that protesters had "little understanding" of law. Yin Yin Nwe, a member of the President Education Advisory Group, remarked that complete decentralization of education would be impossible. The advisory group also stated that government committees that would be established as mentioned in the law were not designed to control universities but just to allocate budget.

The National League for Democracy, the main opposition party led by Aung San Su Kyi, was rather silent on the issue. In fact, the party distanced itself from the student protests stating explicitly that they would not follow National Network for Education Reform and did not endorse its criticism of the law (behind the student protests). Moreover, Phyo Min Thein, one the NLD's Pyithu Hluttaw Representatives, said that the current law was "practical" given the political constraints.

=== Main Opponents of the Law ===
==== National Network for Education Reform ====
NNER is one of the most vocal opponents of the national education bill since its drafting stage. It is a coalition of civil society groups that include student unions, teacher unions, ethnic education groups, faith-based education groups, disabled education groups, community-based education groups, alternative education groups, education branches of political organisations, scholars and interested persons. It was formed in 2012 and had held several discussions across the country to seek opinions from the public on the current education reform process and in June 2013, it held a nationwide conference, attended by 1200 participants. During the drafting process of national education bill, NNER met with several government representatives and was even invited to meetings held in Naypyidaw. However, later it was left out from the discussion on the crafting of the bill.

==== Student and Teacher Unions ====
The two most eminent student unions involved in opposing the education law are All Burma Federation of Student Unions and Confederation of University Student Unions and Middle Myanmar Student Unions. These organizations are also the major force behind the student protests against the law.

MTF (Myanmar Teachers Federation), a nationwide teacher union, is also one of the major opponents of the bill. It released a statement on September 15, 2014, to publicly assert their position on the issue:

We would like to announce to the people that we strongly believe that the National Education Law will affect not only the education sector but [also] the entire country and the people. Therefore, the Myanmar Teachers Federation will fully cooperate with the student unions across the country who are pushing for the education reform that will benefit the country.

In the same statement, MTF also criticized the government for investigating the students' protests against the law and called for the drop of criminal charges.

== Student protests ==
=== Initial Protest: May 2014 - Sept 2014 ===
The earliest protests against the National Education Law came even before the passage of the bill. In Mandalay Region, students at colleges and universities had held ongoing protests since May 2014. The protests were, however, postponed in early September due to upcoming exams but the students continued holding public talks to voice why they opposed the bill. Initially, protesters also linked their campaigns against the bill to the arrest of an ABFSU member, Phyu Hnin Htwe, charged for allegedly kidnapping two Chinese workers from Letpadaung Copper Mine. Government authorities also initiated criminal investigations against these protests based on the ground that they were held without prior government approval.

=== Emergency Student Meeting: October – 13 Nov 2014 ===
On 4 October 2014, three days after the law was enacted, an organizing committee was formed composed of 10 members of ABFSU and 10 members of CUSU. On 10 October, ABFSU announced that they would be holding an emergency meeting with student representatives from across the country in November. The plan was to have a two-day meeting to discuss about the National Education Law on the first day and then make plans on how to proceed on the next day. Later, the meeting was held in Yangon from November 12 to 13, which concluded with the formation of Action Committee for Democratic Education - 15-person group that consists of members of ABFSU, CUSU and MMSU - in charge of planning the four-day protest in Yangon.

=== The Four-Day March: Nov 14–17 2014 ===
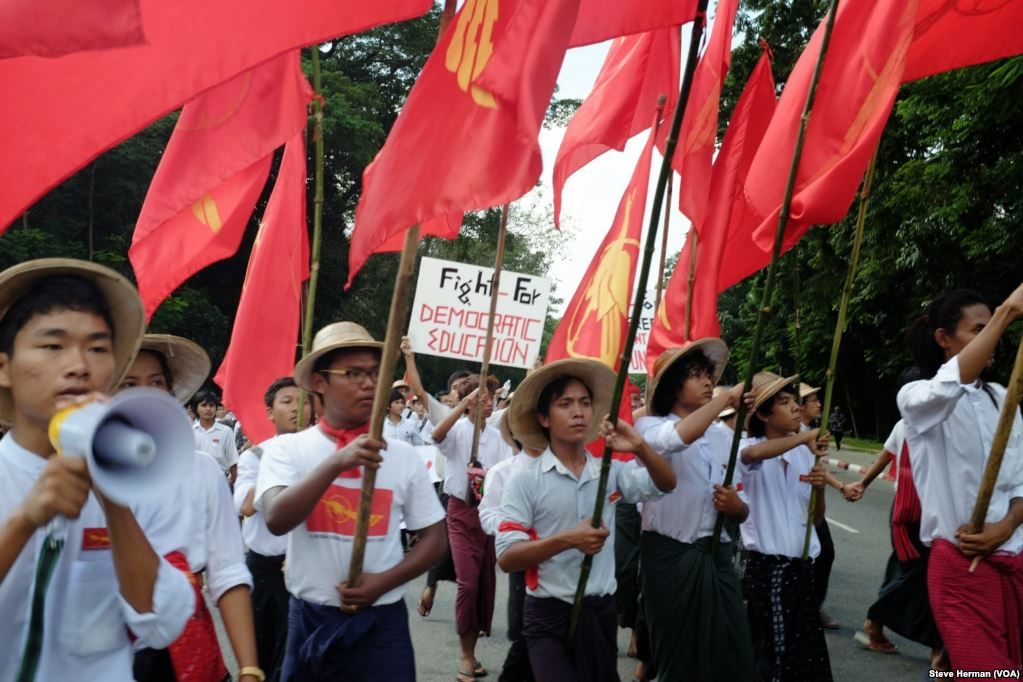
Students protests at Yangon University

On November 14, about 350 students gathered in front of Maha Bandula Park in downtown Yangon to stage a protest against the National Education Law. The students also later held subsequent protests at Yangon University and Shwedagon Pagoda. Moreover, Kyaw Ko Ko, the chairman of ABFSU, declared that the protest was just the beginning of the fight to reform National Education Law. He also stated that the main concern against the NEL is the formation of a National Education Commission composed of ministers and government officials that could limit students' opinions and further reinforce the government control over higher education. The protest also coincided with United States President Barack Obama's second visit to Yangon although Kyaw Ko Ko claimed that it was not intentional. He added, though, that the students would be ready to seize the opportunity to raise awareness about issues on education. The Action Committee for Democratic Education then requested the government to convene a quadripartite meeting with its members, NNER, members of Parliament and the government to discuss the students' concerns. On 17 November, the students announced a 60-day interval for the government to respond to their demands and also threatened that they would stage a nationwide protests if the government didn't respond within the deadline.

=== 60 day Ultimatum: Nov 18, 20 14– Jan 20, 2015 ===
On November 18, a day after the students announced an ultimatum, Ministry of Education held a press conference, urging the students to attend a negotiating meeting with Education Promotion and Implementation Committee (EPIC), which drafted the legislation. At the conference, Khin San Yee, the Minister of Education, said:

I want them to negotiate freely and transparently. Every parent cannot fulfill all of the demands of their children. So think of us like the parents and demand and negotiate with us and we will do. But if the parents can't afford it, the children should understand it.

On November 20, President's Education Advisory Group held a meeting at the Diamond Jubilee Hall at Yangon University, to assert their stance on the current controversy over National Education Law. While acknowledging the voice of the students on the importance of decentralization of education, the group claims that there are limits to how independent universities could be. It further claims that the formation of National Education Committee is the solely on the purpose of budget allocation but not to centralize control over institutions of higher education.

Zaw Htay, the Director General of Higher Education Department (Lower Myanmar) stated that negotiations were still open, after the students rejected a meeting with the ministry. He also said that students, parents and experts would be consulted in the process of crafting by-laws Shwe Mann, the speaker of Pyidaungsu Hluttaw, also agreed to accept written submissions to the parliament while EPIC also offered to serve as an intermediary. The students, however, announced that they had no intention to write submissions to the parliament because they were waiting for the quadripartite meeting.

On November 26, the Action Committee for Democratic Education announced that they were planning a seminar on National Education Law in mid-December and would invite experts unaffiliated with the government or the protesters. They also had plans to stage two more protests in the upcoming week and had held three in the previous week.

On November 27, about fifty students from Mandalay, Sagaing, Monywa and Myingyan staged an unauthorized protest in front of City Hall in Mandalay to reiterate their demand: to convene a quadripartite meeting. The police at first stopped the students from exiting Eaindawyar Pagoda, their initial meeting point. The students, however, convinced the police that the officers' children themselves would benefit from the protests and were able to march to the City Hall and ended their protest at Mahamuni Buddha Temple, a history significant place where 17 Burmese pro-independence leaders were killed during the colonial era.

On December 1, six students were threatened to get arrested for unauthorized protests that took place on November 29. They were told that they would be arrested for a day and then be eligible to be bailed out. The police left to inform the superiors and never returned after the students told them that they would not accept the release on bail but would rather get arrested. The six accused students, also the members of ABFSU, waited at Taungoo train station until 10 pm for the police to show up but then left.

On December 12, the Ministry of Education formed a teacher union consisting of two teachers from each department of Yangon University of Foreign Languages. Myanmar Teachers Federation promptly rejected the ministry's attempt to form a union stating that it violated the internationally accepted principles of freedom of association. A statement released by MTF also said that the ministry failed to recognize MTF even though Burma had agreed to adhere to 1955 International Labor convention that guaranteed the formation of union and the right to organize and despite MTF's compliance with the current Burma's labor draft law.

=== The 404-Mile March: Jan 16 – Jan 31 2015 ===
After the 60-day ultimatum to convene a quadripartite expired on Jan 16, students from far afield as Pakokku, Sagaing and Monywa set out to join the march from Mandalay to Yangon. On Jan 20, more than a hundred students left Mandalay as the march began. The students also had plans to join other student protesters on their 404-mile journey to Yangon that they were planning to finish in 15 days. They also said that they would set up a camp after arriving in Yangon to urge the government to consult with students and teachers on future amendments to the law. Immediately after the march began, President Thein Sein, announced in a state-run newspaper on Jan 21 that the parliament should reconsider some parts of the National Education Law and said that amendments would lead to stability and allow the students to resume their studies.

On January 23, in a statement released by the parliament mentioned that it had agreed to consider changing the National Education Law and ordered the Ministry of Education to urgently come up with a draft that would incorporate inputs from both houses of the parliament, related government committees and commissions as well as relevant individuals. On January 24, ACDE released a statement that outlined the 11 issues that the students wanted to discuss at the quadripartite meeting:

1. Inclusion of representatives of teachers and students in legislation process of education policies and laws, by-laws and other related laws,
2. The right to freely establish and operate student and teacher unions and legal recognition for them,
3. Establishment of National Education Commission and University Coordination Committee mentioned in the approved National Education Law
4. Self-determination and self-management on educational affairs of individual state/regions and schools
5. Modifying current examination and university matriculation system
6. Modifying teaching methods to such that ensure freedom for thinking and self-studying of students
7. Inclusion of a provision in National Education Law that ensure freedom for the practice of ethnic languages and mother tongue based multi-lingual education (MTB-MLE) for ethnic populations and tribes
8. Inclusive education for all children including children with disabilities
9. Resumption of enrollment for students previously expelled from schools due to the student uprisings
10. Allocation of 20 percent of national budget for education
11. Regulating of free compulsory education up to middle school level rather than primary level

On January 28, the student representatives and the government had a meeting in Naypyidaw – attended by ten student representatives, two members of parliament and Minister Aung Min as well as Deputy Education Minister Thant Shin. The government and the student leaders then released a joint statement announcing that they had agreed to stop the march to Yangon after the quadripartite meeting which would be held at the Diamond Jubilee Hall at Yangon University on February 1. The statement also said that 11 demand-points from the students would also be discussed at the meeting on February 1. Meanwhile, the students declared that until they met with their representatives who went to Naypyidaw for the meeting, they would still continue the march. On the other hand, the protesters in Pakokku and Dawei who were planning to join the march suspended their plans.

=== The Quadripartite Meetings: Feb 1–14, 2015 ===
On February 1 as the quadripartite meeting was taking place, the NLD publicly announced that Thein Lwin, its central committee member and the chairman of National Network for Education Reform, did not represent the party or its policies. It further mentioned in the statement that the NLD could take legal action against Thein Lwin for violating party rules regarding asking permission to participate in organizations independent of the party. Han Tha Myint, a central committee member of the NLD, also stated that Aung San Suu Kyi, the chairman of the NLD, did not support Thein Lwin as his actions could be construed as representative of the party's stance on the issue. The ACDE promptly responded to that statement the next day by accusing the NLD for attempting to undermine the student protests at such a critical moment.

The first quadripartite meeting ended with the students reaching an agreement concerning eight preconditions on further negotiations although the government denied the request to ensure security to demonstrators. However, Aung Min, a President's Office Minister, told the students that he would ask permission from the president the responsibility of the students' safety until they arrived in Popa in Mandalay Region. The first three preconditions from the students –issuing a public statement after every meeting, having information on education reforms available to the public, making sure all the parties involved in the meeting have equal opportunities to participate – were readily accepted while agreement on officially recognizing student and teacher unions was reached after four-hour long discussion albeit many details pending for further discussions. Furthermore, the meeting ended without any discussions on the eleven-point demands that the ACDE issued even though the students reached to an official agreement to continue the negotiations on February 3.

On February 3, in front of Ministry of Education headquarter in Naypyidaw, the students announced that they would be resuming their nationwide protests. Earlier that day, the government declared that the second quadripartite meeting was postponed after refusing to allow extra attendees who came along with the students to the meeting. During the meeting, Aung Min read out a letter, which he claimed to have just received from the president. The letter suggested that the meeting should be postponed and the government representatives decided to follow the president's advice after a discussion. That early afternoon, the Ministry of Information released photos of government delegates standing in an empty room with a caption saying that the students did not show up to the meeting. Later that day, the government announced that the meeting would be postponed until February 12. The student leaders, meanwhile, declared that they have students ready to continue marching to Yangon from different parts of the country, including Mandalay in the north, Pathein in the southwest and Dawei in the south. On the same day, Aung San Su Kyi confirmed her opinions on the current protests, asking Thein Lwin to resign from his position in the central executive committee if he wanted to pursue his work with NNER. Initially silent on the topic, U Thein Lwin said in a press conference on February 3 that he would accept NLD's decision.

On February 4, the student demonstrators from Ayeyarwady Region have arrived near Kyaunggon after they received a welcoming reception from the town residents. About 800 people also temporarily joined the students marching from Mandalay on their way to Taungdwingyi after the leaders gave a speech at Magwe Computer University. The students also planned to stay and protest in Pakokku for three days starting February 5 before they resumed their march to Yangon. At the same time, a committee representing about 260 civil society groups released a statement urging the government to continue quadripartite meetings and to refrain from the use of violence against student protestors.

On February 5, it was confirmed that students from Ayeyarwady Region and Taninthayi Region had continued marching to Yangon to join other protesters. That same day, the government announced that some political organization with intentions to destabilize the country were behind the student protests even though it did not identify them. It further urged the public to remind themselves of riots resulting in instability in the past.

On February 7, Ko Ko, Minister for Home Affairs, said in the interview that some political extremists were manipulating students to use methods of confrontation and that in some cases, most of them were supported by foreign organizations. Ye Yint Kyaw, a member of the ACDE, retaliated by accusing the government of having the same mentality as the former military regime.

On February 9, the NLD released a statement saying that Thein Lwin, a member of NNER, was suspended from his position in the party's central executive committee indefinitely. Another statement released by the NLD also announced the suspension of its Central Education Committee chaired by Thein Lwin. Aung San Su Kyi, the leader of the NLD, also said that it was a conflict of interest for a party member to be involved in an organization independent of the party. Thein Lwin responded by saying that he believed "student demands are righteous". The statement came out as Thein Lwin along with other education advocates and student representatives attended the third quadripartite meeting with Deputy Minister of Education and reached an agreement to resume further talks on February 11 at Yangon Region Parliamentary building. At the same time, the students marching from Mandalay were approaching Pyay in Bago Region and were about a mile away from a barricade set up by 200 riot police and 100 Swan Arr Shin members. About 300 residents from nearby towns accompanied the students to protect them due to rumors of a possible crackdown. Meanwhile, the students marching from Tanintharyi Region arrived in Mawlamyine, the capital of Mon State the day before and held several demonstrations joined by the locals (thein lwin suspended). The third group leaving from Ayeyarwady Region reportedly arrived in Maubin, about 100 miles away from Yangon. In Dedaye, in the northwest of Maubin and about 56 miles from Yangon, around 400 riot police were deployed. The student protesters called for negotiations with the police in case of a potential confrontation and the police informed that they were there to provide security not to stop the protests. Moreover, the fourth group of around 300 students left Pakokku, following the path that the group from Mandalay took several weeks ago.

After ten-hour long meeting on February 11, the government accepted all the demands from the students. The students and the government delegates released a joint-statement, saying that the government generally agreed on the 11 demands and that the meeting would be reconvened on February 14 to further discuss the details. The plan was to send the proposed bill to the parliament on February 16. Despite the agreement, the student protesters announced that they would continue the march since the parliament had not passed the amendments.

To the students' surprise, the government released a statement on February 13 announcing that it would not allow the students to enter Yangon and that it would take measures to restore stability if the students did not halt their march. The students immediately held a meeting that evening to decide whether they should continue. The day before on February 12, the students sent a delegate to meet with Aung San Su Kyi who then told the students that it would be impossible to achieve all their demands and that was just the nature of democracy.

=== Post-quadripartite Meetings: Feb 15 – March 1, 2015 ===
As the fourth quadripartite meeting on February 14 went without any issues, the student leaders and NNER began to craft the proposed amendment bill, which they finished on February 15. and the bill was submitted to the parliament on February 16. Student groups from Ayeyarwady Region and Tanintharyi Region decided to suspend their march after hearing the result of the meeting. Student organizers also stated one of the reasons they decided to go back was because of Ashin Nyanisarra, one of the most respected monks in Myanmar, who told them to take pride in what they achieved and go back to continue their education for the future of the country. In another statement, Ashin Nyanisarra told the government to forgive the students and to accept their demands. Meanwhile, the main group of protesters from Mandalay continued to march from Minla to Letpadan in Bago Region and planned to arrive in Yangon in ten days despite announcement by the government the day before that it would be taking legal actions against the protesters if they continued their march to Yangon.

On February 19, the protesters from Ayeyarwaddy Region stalled their march and set up temporary camps in Maubin and Pathein Townships as they waited for the decision from the parliament while giving public talks on the latest updates on the agreements they had with the government and the content of the proposed amendment bill. That day, Union Nationalities Alliance announced that they were in support of the student protests and donated $1000 while at the same time urging the parliament to quickly pass the amendments. Meanwhile, some 30 students from Dagon University in Yangon staged a sit-in in front of the rector's office from 9:30 am to noon after they were unknowing invited to a campus event earlier that week that condemned the student protests. The sit-in was also a response to the article featured in The Mirror, a state-owned newspaper that claimed that students had organized the event by themselves.

On February 20, the main column of student protesters from Mandalay announced that they would take a break from marching until March 1 due to primary and middle school exams coming up at the end of February. The students also stated that they wanted to give time to the parliament and see how it would handle the amendment bill.

On February 22, at a press conference in Yangon, the students accused the government for violating the agreements as the government submitted the Ministry of Education's version of the amendment bill along with the one agreed upon at the quadripartite meetings. Earlier that week on February 17, the Ministry of Education presented two proposed bills, claiming that the ministry crafted one of them. The bill that the Ministry of Education proposed, according to Thein Lwin, the chairman of NNER, was the one presented at first at the quadripartite meeting but agreed to be discarded by the government. The competing drafts in the parliament might delay the process and could take up to a month according to Phyo Min Thein, a member of parliament representing the NLD. Despite concerns from the students, the two proposed bills seemed to have some features in common. They both stated that schools and universities will be independent from the National Education Commission; that the school system would cater to students with disabilities; that the students would have the right to choose subjects they want to study except for those mandatory to pass the matriculation; that students and teachers would have the right to form unions and if necessary with financial help from university administration; that schools would be able to choose which language to teach; and that the government would increase the funding to 20% of the national budget in five years.

Meanwhile, on February 24, the Amyotha Hluttaw (the Upper House) invited six major groups of stakeholders - the NNER, the ACDE, some 20 political parties, relevant members of the public, civil society groups and individuals who submitted the suggestions to the parliament - on the current issue to attend public hearings between March 5 – 15. Later that day, the State Sangha Maha Nayaka Committee (SSMNC) – a body of government-appointed monks in charge of regulating Buddhist monks in Burma – issued a statement to the parliament publicly accusing that the proposed amendment bill that recognized unions will result in confusion between religious and political issues, leading to the demise of the roots of Theravada Buddhism. Arkar Moe Thu, a member of NNER, however, pointed out that according to Article 68(a), "schools that only teach religion are not governed by the law". Meanwhile, the students confirmed that they would continue marching on March 1, accusing the parliament for intentionally delaying the process of passing the amendment bill.

On February 25, in response to the accusation from the students, Khin Maung Yi, the chairperson of Joint Bill Committee, stated that the committee was not just buying time. He also claimed that the committee was putting all necessary effort to finalize the bill in the current parliamentary session amidst other important bills such as the budget bill, the taxation bill and the national planning bill. Moreover, since the education bill is not under the category of bills that will go directly to the Union of Parliament, it has to go through the Lower House and the Upper House before it could be passed.

On February 27, the students met with Shwe Mann, the Speaker of the Pyidaungsu Hluttaw and the Joint Bill Committee to voice their concerns over the competing bills but they were told that the bills were already submitted to the parliament. Nanda Sit Aung, member of the ACDE, said that it was the violation of the quadripartite agreements because the bill that was submitted as the one proposed by students and the NNER was actually the one that everyone agreed at the quadripartite meeting.

On March 2, as the students prepared to resume their march to Yangon from Letpadan, the police surrounded the monastery where they were staying. The students then agreed to delay their march and were joined by another group of students that pushed through a barricade of riot police.

On March 3, a confrontation broke out between the student protesters and the police when a group of female students went to sit in front of the monks who were on hunger strike. The police misinterpreted the move as the students attempting to push through the line and came charging toward the students. The issue was later resolved when student leaders came to calm down the situation. Earlier that day, students negotiated with Bago Region Border and Security Affairs Minister Col. Thet Htun who urged them to halt their march. The students offered a compromise and stated that they would disperse in Yangon if the minister agreed on the eight-point conditions: to march to Tharawaddy, the nearest town; to fly banners and use megaphones after they embarked on vehicles to Yangon; and to have the police forces keep a distance from them. However, they did not receive any response from the minister.

On March 4, the students woke up to find that the government had reinforced the blockade with barbed wire. The riot police also stopped a group of student protesters who left [Pyay] to join the students in Letpadan. The truck the students were on was checked on its way to Letpadan and was not allowed to continue. A police officer said that they were ordered to stop the protesters and that the students should wait for the results of the negotiation scheduled for the next day. Police Lt. Col. Nanda Win also said that he wanted the issue to be resolved peacefully that did not intend to use force.

=== The Crackdowns: March 5 – 10 2015 ===
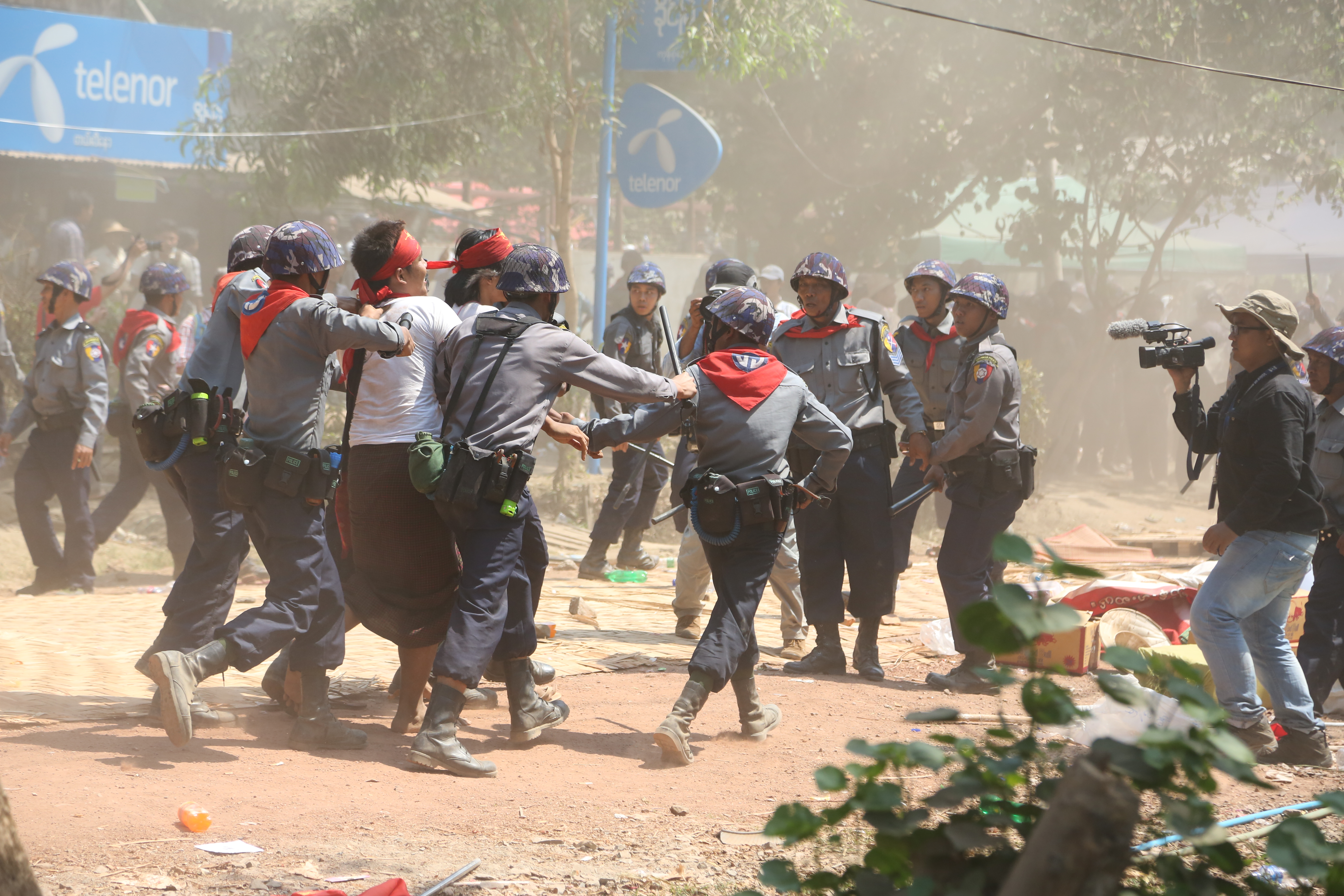
Police forcefully dispersed the protesting students in Letpadan

On March 5, the student representatives boycotted the parliamentary hearings due to police blockade of the protesters in Letpadan. On that day, the protest staged right outside of Yangon City Hall to show solidarity with the student protesters in Letpadan was cracked down by the riot police and civilians with "duty" armbands. There were in total about fifty protesters and eight people were arrested - five students and three members from 88 Generation Peace and Open Society. Instead of detaining them in a police station, they were taken to the former office of Ministry of Agriculture in Yankin Township.

On March 6, all eight students were released but they were charged under Article 18 of Peaceful Assembly Law for organizing unlawful protest, which could result in up to one-year prison sentence. The same morning, another five student protesters near the town market in Letpadan were arrested and the Letpadan local police also announced that 11 people present at a rally two days earlier would be charged under the same article used to arrest protesters in Yangon. There were also two rallies that day, one near the Yangon University campus and one at the entrance of Mandalay University campus to criticize the government's violent crackdown of the protests a day earlier in Yangon and to urge the government to let the students continue their march from Letpadan.

On March 9, the students after going a hunger strike since March 3 announced the deadline at 10 am on March 10, asking the government to bring an end to the standoff in Letpadan and to allow them to continue marching to Yangon.

On March 10, as the deadline expired, the students began to remove the barbed wire set up by the police but their attempt was futile. After their second attempt an hour later, the police declared that the protest was illegal and ordered the students to evacuate the monastery five persons at a time and not to leave Yangon in one group. The students refused and turned themselves in for peaceful arrests. The police then initiated an assault on the protesters including those inside the monastery. The exact number of injured people was not confirmed but the estimate was around 100. The police also attacked on volunteers working to escort the injured. Zar Zar Tun from Free Funeral Service Society, an organization in support of the movement from the beginning, announced that the first ambulance provided by the organization transported six men and two women one of whom suffered a severe head injury. In a statement released by the Ministry of Information, a total of 127 people – 100 men and 27 women – were arrested. The Myanmar Council also released a statement later that afternoon condemning the arrest of the journalists during the crackdown. At 2:30 pm on the same day, a group of students marching from Hledan junction in Yangon to downtown was also dispersed using force, minutes after the protest began. Several people were injured and initially one of the protesters was handcuffed but later released at the scene after the students plead and agreed to disband.

The Letpadan crackdown received criticism from the European Union as well as the NLD, which was not in support of the current student movement. The EU that had funded about $11 million on trainings to enhance the country's police force witnessed three student crackdowns as the first phase of EU-funded training came to an end. NLD also released a statement calling for independent government investigation on the reasons behind the use of violence

== See also ==
- Education in Burma
- 8888 Uprising
- U Thant funeral crisis
