= Mar Lay =

Burmese linguist and writer (1934–2024)

- Born: February 1934; Yangon, Myanmar
- Died: December 31, 2024 (aged 90); Yangon, Myanmar
- Education: University of Yangon
- Occupations: Linguist; Author
- Spouse: Myansargon Kyaw Myint
- Writing career
- Pen name: Tekkatho Wint Mar; Yuwadi Kalaungshin Wint Mar

Mar Lay (1934–2024) was a Burmese linguist and writer who served as the head of the Burmese Department at Yangon University of Foreign Languages. She was best known for her influential book Burmese Kinship Terms, originally written as her M.A. thesis, which became a major reference in the study of Burmese sociolinguistics. Her husband, Myansargon Kyaw Myint, was also a linguist and writer, and the couple were regarded as prominent contributors to the field of Burmese language studies.

== Life ==
Mar Lay was born in February 1934 in Yangon to U San and Daw Saw. After completing her M.A. degree at the University of Yangon, she began her academic career in 1959 as a tutor in the university's Burmese Department. She subsequently taught at Pathein Community College (1960–1961), Mawlamyine College (1974–1978), and the University of Yangon (1978–1989). In addition to Burmese, she also taught the Pyu language at the various institutions where she served. Mar Lay later became an associate professor and was appointed head of the Burmese Department at Yangon University of Foreign Languages, a position she held from 1989 until her retirement in 1995.

Following her retirement, she continued to participate actively in academic life. She served as a teaching fellow in Burmese language and literature and as a steering committee member for doctoral programmes at Yangon University. She was also a long-standing member of the Myanmar Writers Association.

Mar Lay began her writing career in 1953 under the pen name TTC Wai Oo. In 1955, she contributed to Yuwadi journal using the name Yuwadi Kalaungshin Wint Mar. Later, during her university years, she adopted the pen name Tekkatho Wint Mar.

In her later years, she pursued a Diploma in Sutadhamma at the University of Wisdom Land. Mar Lay died on 31 December 2024 in Yangon while preparing for her Buddhist bachelor examination.
