= Southeast Asian Ministers of Education Organization =

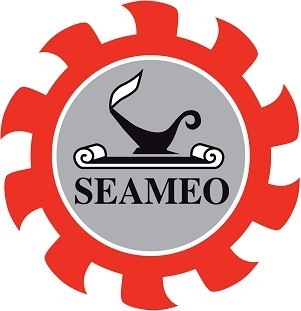

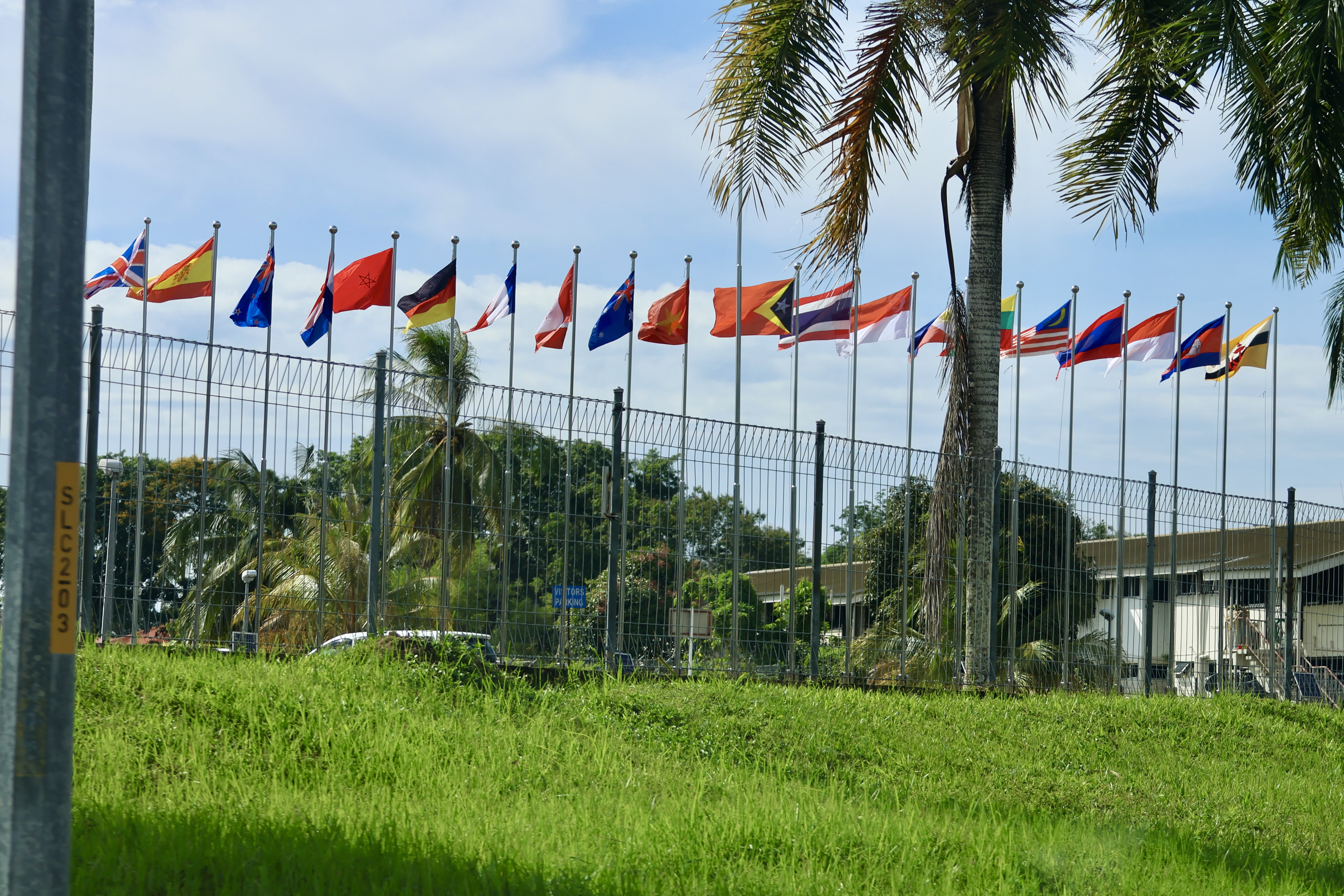
- Flags of member countries waving at SEAMEO Voctech Centre, Brunei
- Abbreviation: SEAMEO
- Formation: 30 November 1965; 60 years ago
- Type: International organization
- Legal status: Active
- Headquarters: SEAMEO Secretariat, Bangkok, Thailand
- Members: 11 Member Countries, 9 Associate Members, and 8 Affiliate Members.
- President: Sonny Angara
- Vice President: Romaizah Mohd Salleh
- Key people: Hangchuon Naron; Abdul Mu'ti; Phout Simmalavong; Fadhlina Sidek; Chaw Chaw Sein; Desmond Lee; Prasert Jantararuangtong; Dulce de Jesus Soares; Hoàng Minh Sơn
- Main organ: SEAMEO Council
- Website: https://www.seameo.org

The Southeast Asia Ministers of Education Organization (SEAMEO) is an intergovernmental organization of the eleven Southeast Asian countries, which was formed on 30 November 1965 by the Kingdom of Laos, Malaysia, the Philippines, Singapore, Thailand and the then Republic of Vietnam. SEAMEO aims to promote regional cooperation in the fields of education, science and culture. The current SEAMEO President is Sonny Angara of the Philippines.

== Membership ==
SEAMEO consists of 11 Member Countries, 6 Associate Members, and 8 Affiliate Members.

=== Member Countries ===
1. Brunei
2. Cambodia
3. Indonesia
4. Lao PDR
5. Malaysia
6. Myanmar
7. Philippines
8. Singapore
9. Thailand
10. Timor-Leste
11. Vietnam

=== Associate Members Countries ===
1. Australia
2. Canada
3. France
4. Germany
5. Morocco
6. Netherlands
7. New Zealand
8. Spain
9. United Kingdom

=== Affiliate Members ===
1. Asia-Pacific Centre of Education for International Understanding (APCEIU)
2. British Columbia Council for International Education (BCCIE)
3. British Council
4. China Education Association for International Exchange (CEAIE)
5. International Council for Open and Distance Education (ICDE)
6. Southeast Asia One Health University Network (SEAOHUN)
7. The Education University of Hong Kong
8. University of Tsukuba

== SEAMEO Council ==
As of 2026, the members of the SEAMEO Council is as follows:

- President: Sonny Angara
- Vice President: Romaizah Mohd Salleh
- Member: Hangchuon Naron
- Member: Abdul Mu'ti
- Member: Phout Simmalavong
- Member: Fadhlina Sidek
- Member: Chaw Chaw Sein
- Member: Desmond Lee
- Member: Prasert Jantararuangtong
- Member: Dulce de Jesus Soares
- Member: Hoàng Minh Sơn

== Events ==
SEAMEO organised the SEAMEO Mathematics Olympiad, a regional competition for young mathematicians.

== Joint programs ==
In 2014 SEAMEO announced a joint program with the German Government called "Fit For School", the first phase running over 3 years will concentrate on basic hygiene of pre—school and primary school children, improving sanitation facilities and bringing hand-washing and tooth brushing into school.

The Director of the Regional Centre for Community Education is Niane Sivongxay.

== See also ==
- SEAMEO RECSAM
- SEAMEO SEARCA (South East Asian Regional Center for Graduate Study and Research in Agriculture)
- SEAMEO SPAFA
- SEAMEO SEN (Regional Centre for Special Educational Needs)
