= Nyunt Phay =

Union Minister for Education of Myanmar

- ညွန့်ဖေ

Minister of Education
- In office 16 February 2021 – 31 July 2025
- Prime Minister: Min Aung Hlaing
- Preceded by: Myo Thein Gyi
- Succeeded by: Chaw Chaw Sein

Rector of Pathein University
- In office 21 January 2010 – 23 October 2017

Director General of Department of Monitoring and Evaluation (Education)
- In office 2017–2021

Personal details
- Born: 1961 (age 64–65)

Nyunt Phay (Burmese: ညွန့်ဖေ; born 1961) is the Union Minister for Education of Myanmar since 2021 to 2025. He was appointed by the State Administration Council after the 2021 coup. He previously served as the Rector of Pathein University and was asked by the President's Office for clarification due to financial scandals at the university.

== Financial issues ==
When an order was issued to transfer Rector of Pathein University to Director General of the Department of Monitoring and Evaluation (Education) in Nay Pyi Taw without the authority of the Rector, he quickly signed a contract with a company to build new old staff quarters at Pathein University. He also had problems with university finances.
