= Subhadradis Diskul =

Thai prince, art historian, and archaeologist (1923–2003)

Mom Chao Subhadradis Diskul
- หม่อมเจ้าสุภัทรดิศ ดิศกุล
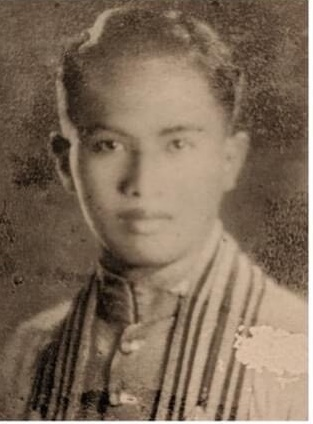
- Born: 23 November 1923; Bangkok, Siam
- Died: 6 November 2003 (aged 79)
- Father: Damrong Rajanubhab
- Relatives: Rama IV (grandfather)

Mom Chao (Note: His Serene Highness Prince) Subhadradis Diskul (Thai: สุภัทรดิศ ดิศกุล, RTGS: Suphattharadit Ditsakun; 23 November 1923 – 6 November 2003) was a Thai prince and academic in the fields of art history and archaeology, who was instrumental in establishing academic training in these fields in Thailand. A son of Prince Damrong Rajanubhab, he trained in archaeology at the École du Louvre and the Institute of Archaeology, University of London. He worked as curator of the Bangkok National Museum and joined Silpakorn University as a professor in the Faculty of Archaeology in 1964, serving as its president from 1982 to 1986. He also served as Director of the SEAMEO Regional Centre for Archaeology and Fine Arts (SPAFA) and President of the Siam Society.
