= U Raschid =

Indian Burmese Muslim politician

- ဦးရာရှစ်
- Born: Raschid Sakur; 5 November 1912; Allahabad, British India
- Died: 21 April 1987 (aged 74); Karachi, Pakistan
- Occupation: Politician
- Known for: First Chairman of All Burma Federation of Student Unions
- Parent(s): Mr. M. A. Sakur (father); Ahmadi Begum (mother)

U Raschid also Yar Shit (Burmese: ဦးရာရှစ်; 5 November 1912 – 21 April 1978), an Indian Burmese Muslim politician, was the first chairman of the All Burma Federation of Student Unions and active in the student movement against the ruling British.

== Early life and education ==
Raschid was born on November 5, 1912, in Allahabad, India. In 1914, Raschid and his family moved to Rangoon from India when he was two years old. His father was Mr. M. A. Sakur and his mother was Ahmadi Begum. His father, Mr. M. A. Sakur, was an Indian-Burmese trader and opened a shop on Dalhousie Road (now Mahabandula Road) and was the first person to import and sell Phonograph to Myanmar. He studied at Randaria High School in Yangon. He graduated from Yangon University with Bachelor of Laws.

== University years ==
In 1929, Thahtay U Nyo donated the construction of the union building, which was completed in 1930. Although there is a union building, there is no union organization. Students, including Raschid, tried to form a Federation of Student Unions. In 1931 he was a member of the committee that drafted the Federation of Student Unions constitution, which was chaired by Kyaw Khin. 1931, which ratified the Federation of Student Unions constitution; From the student meeting held on 9 January, when nine executive members were elected, Raschid became the Secretary of the Federation of Student Unions. From 1935 to 1936, U Nu was the chairman of the Yangon ‌University Students' Union and he was the vice-president. At the time, Aung San was the secretary of the Yangon University Students' Union. He also was the leader of student strike in 1936. During the student strike, Thein Pe, Nyo Mya, Kyaw Nyein, Hla Mg, Tun Oh, U Nu, and Aung San participated. This was followed by the All Burma Federation of Student Unions and the Student Thanmani Army, National University and the student parliament movements have emerged. After that, he also co-founded the Red Dragon Book Club outside the university with them. Raschid was elected chairman of the student union, elected in June 1936. Secretary Aung San was elected.

He led the convening of the All Burma Students 'Conference and the establishment of the All Burma Federation of Student Unions. The first conference was chaired by U Nu. He served as chairman of the reception committee. He was elected by that conference and became the first chairman of the All Burma Federation of Student Unions.

== Political and other careers ==
After the war, he joined the Anti-Fascist People's Freedom League and was a member of the committee drafting the 1947 constitution. He also served on the Labor Legislative Committee. During the era of parliamentary democracy He was repeatedly elected as a Member of Parliament to the House of Representatives and Ethnic Parliament.

In 1952 U Nu appointed him as Minister for Housing and Labour, later in 1954, Minister for Trade and Development, in 1956, Minister of Mines, in 1960 Minister of Commerce and Industry. In 1958 he was the Vice President of the Trade Union Council of Burma. In the 1960s, Burmese independence leader and 1st Prime Minister of Burma, U Nu wanted to send Raschid as permanent representative to the United Nations in Burma, but he refused.

In 1961, he was elected chairman of the International Labour Organization General Assembly. On March 2, 1962, General Ne Win arrested him for six years along with Prime Minister U Nu's cabinet ministers during the coup. In 1974, he was detained for a second time for 18 months. In 1978, he became chairman of the Muslim minority committee of the Muslim World League.

== Personal life ==
He married Daw Fatima (BA). They have two sons.

== Death ==
In 1987, He died of prostate cancer on Friday, April 21, in Karachi, Pakistan. The tomb of his is marked as Raschid of Burma.
