= Mi Mi Gyi =

Burmese professor of international relations

- မိမိကြီး

Pro-rector of the University of Mandalay
- Incumbent
- Assumed office 16 March 2020

Pro-rector of Mandalay University of Foreign Languages
- In office 27 November 2017 – 18 March 2020

Pro-rector of Pathein University
- In office April 2016 – November 2017

Personal details
- Born: Myanmar
- Occupation: Professor, Pro-rector

Mi Mi Gyi (Burmese: မိမိကြီး) is a Burmese professor of international relations and a pro-rector of Mandalay University. She takes responsibility for academic, university development and international relations sections of the university. She previously served as a pro-rector of Mandalay University of Foreign Languages and Pathein University. Her current research is on 2020 Myanmar general election.

== Career ==
Mi Mi Gyi conferred her PhD degree in international relations from Mandalay University in 2006, with her thesis The Rise and Fall of Burma Socialist Programme Party Government.

From 2011 to 2016, she served as a professor and head of the Department of International Relations and Political Science of Mandalay University. From April 2016 to November 2017, Mi Mi Gyi served as a pro-rector of Pathein University.

From November 2017 to March 2020, she served as a pro-rector of Mandalay University of Foreign Languages.

On 16 March 2020, Mi Mi Gyi was appointed as a pro-rector of Mandalay University. She is currently teaching Master of Political Studies (MPol) classes at Mandalay University.
