= Phyoe Phyoe Aung =

Burmese student activist (born 1988)

- ဖြိုးဖြိုးအောင်
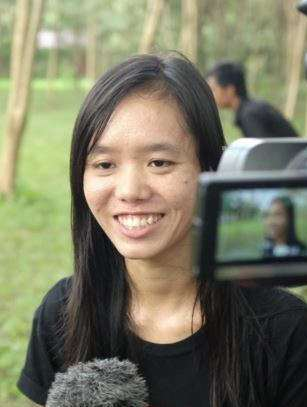
- Born: August 25, 1988 (age 37)
- Organization: All Burma Federation of Student Unions
- Known for: Activism
- Movement: Saffron Revolution, Education reform campaign
- Parent(s): Ne Win (activist); Thandar

Phyoe Phyoe Aung (Burmese: ဖြိုးဖြိုးအောင်; born 25 August 1988) is a student activist and former political prisoner from Burma (Myanmar). Her father is also an activist and was repeatedly arrested and sentenced for long prison terms under the military regime. She was one year old when her father was arrested and sentenced for 20 years in 1989. She was awarded an International Women of Courage Award in 2021.

== Political imprisonment ==
Phyoe Phyoe Aung was involved in the Saffron Revolution in 2007 and went into hiding. She worked together with her father in collecting the bodies for burial after Cyclone Nargis hit the Delta Region in May 2008. Both were arrested with others during their trip back to Yangon. She was sentenced for 4 years in prison by the military junta in June 2008. She was studying civil engineering at that time. She was released from Mawlamyaing Prison in October 2011 and became the general secretary of the All Burma Federation of Student Unions (ABFSU) and a member of the Democratic Education Movement Leading Committee at the age of 27. She became a prominent leader of education reform campaign in 2014–15.

She was one of the leaders of students marching from Mandalay to Yangon to protest the new National Education Bill, and the protest was violently suppressed by the Myanmar Police Force in Letpadan Township on 10 March 2015. She attended sequel of meetings with Ministers and various stakeholders to discuss education bill and reform at Yangon, after which she was arrested.

== Awards and recognitions ==
Her courage was praised by former American president George W. Bush. She received the Citizen of Burma Award for 2015. Amnesty International has declared her a prisoner of conscience.

On International Women's Day in 2021 she was given the International Women of Courage Award from the US Secretary of State, Tony Blinken. The ceremony was virtual due to the ongoing COVID-19 pandemic and it included an address by First Lady, Jill Biden. After the award ceremony all of the fourteen awardees would be able to take part in a virtual exchange as part an International Visitor Leadership Program.

She was released in April 2016.
