= Department of Higher Education (Myanmar) =

Government department in Myanmar

- အဆင့်မြင့်ပညာဦးစီးဌာန(အဆည)

Department overview
- Formed: October 1983; 41 years ago
- Preceding agencies: Universities Administrative Office; Department of High Education
- Jurisdiction: Government of Myanmar
- Headquarters: Office No (13), Naypyidaw, Myanmar
- Minister responsible: Myo Thein Gyi, Dr
- Department executives: Thein Win, Dr, Director General; Aung Naing Soe, Dr
- Website: dhe.moe.edu.mm

Department of Higher Education (DHE) was created for administration and coordination of higher education institutions under the Ministry of Education (Myanmar). In 2020, there were 134 universities and colleges under this department.

== History ==
DHE was formed as Universities Administrative Office in 1964. In 1972, it was renamed as Department of High Education. According to People's Assembly Law No(4) Department of High Education was formed as Department of Higher Education. On 1 April 1998, it was divided into DHE (Upper Myanmar) in Mandalay and DHE (Lower Myanmar) in Yangon. On 1 April 2015, it was reformed as Department of Higher Education.
