= Department of Myanmar Examinations =

Government agency of Myanmar

- မြန်မာနိုင်ငံစာစစ်ဦးစီးဌာန

Board overview
- Formed: 15 March 1972; 54 years ago (as Board); 13 September 2012; 14 years ago (as Department)
- Preceding Board: Commission for Examinations
- Board executives: Dr. Thet Lwin, Director general; ?, Deputy director general (education); ?, Deputy director general (administration)
- Parent Board: Ministry of Education
- Website: www.myanmarexam.org

The Department of Myanmar Examinations (Burmese: မြန်မာနိုင်ငံစာစစ်ဦးစီးဌာန), formerly known as the Board of Myanmar Examinations (မြန်မာနိုင်ငံစာစစ်အဖွဲ့), is a governmental body that administers national examinations and sets standardized qualifications. It administers the Matriculation Examination, previously called the Basic Education High School Examination. The Board was formed on 15 March 1972, replacing the Office of the Commissioner for Examinations which had overseen both civil service and high school examinations, and ultimately upgraded as the Department on 13 September 2012.

== See also ==
- Education in Myanmar
