= Chan Nyein =

Burmese politician (1944–2019)

- ချမ်းငြိမ်း

MP of the Pyithu Hluttaw
- In office 31 January 2011 – 29 January 2016
- Preceded by: Constituency established
- Succeeded by: Hlaing Myint Han
- Constituency: Kanbalu Township
- Majority: 101,223 (84.65%)

Minister for Education of Myanmar
- In office 10 August 2005 – 30 March 2011
- Preceded by: Than Aung
- Succeeded by: Mya Aye

Deputy Minister for Science and Technology
- In office May 2001 – 9 August 2005

Personal details
- Born: 15 December 1944 Burma
- Died: January 17, 2019 (aged 74) Yangon
- Party: Union Solidarity and Development Party
- Spouse: Sandar Aung
- Children: 2
- Education: Rangoon Institute of Technology
- Occupation: Professor

Chan Nyein (Burmese: ချမ်းငြိမ်း) is a former Minister for Education of Myanmar (Burma). and a member of the Pyithu Hluttaw, the lower house of the country's national legislature from 2011 to 2016.
