= Kyaw Khin =

Burmese politician

- ကျော်ခင်

Chairman of the Federation of Rangoon University Students' Union
- Incumbent
- Assumed office 1931

Member of the Pyithu Hluttaw
- Incumbent
- Assumed office 1951
- Constituency: Yan Aung Township

Personal details
- Born: Kyaw Khin Thandwe, Rakhine State, Myanmar

Kyaw Khin is a Burmese politician and the first chairman of the Federation of Rangoon University Students' Union.

== Early life and careers ==
He was born in Thandwe, Rakhine State. He attended Central Government High School in Rangoon and passed the University Entrance Exam in 1925. He continued his education at Yangon University.

In 1929, Thahtay U Nyo donated the construction of the union building, which was completed in 1930. Although there is a union building, there is no union organization. Students, including Kyaw Khin, tried to form a Federation of Student Unions. He is the leader of that effort. To prevent the formation of a union;He was threatened. He was also lured into the position of ICC, the Indian contract staff, the "incentive" of university students. However, He was unyielding and was a staunch supporter of the Student Union. Senior students at Rangoon University were the first to discuss the formation of a Federation of Student Unions. Kyaw Khin chaired the meeting and then formed a Federation of Student Unions drafting committee. He chaired its drafting committee. In 1931, the Federation of Student Unions was ratified. From the student meeting held on 9 January, when nine executive members were elected, Kyaw Khin became the chairman of the Federation of Rangoon University Students' Union.

He passed law courses in 1931. He worked as a lawyer in his hometown of Thandwe and as a member of the municipality. And, he also served as chairman of the municipality on civil affairs. In 1951, after the World War II, he was elected to the Pyithu Hluttaw from the Yanaung constituency. He led a Burmese delegation to the World Parliamentary Conference in Bern, Switzerland.
