= Mandalay University of Foreign Languages =

Foreign language university in Myanmar

- မန္တလေး နိုင်ငံခြားဘာသာတက္ကသိုလ်
- Type: Public
- Established: 1997; 29 years ago
- Affiliations: Ministry of Education
- Rector: Dr Tint Tint
- Location: Aungmyethazan, Mandalay, Myanmar; 21.986032°N 96.113149°E
- Campus: Urban
- Website: www.mufl.edu.mm

The Mandalay University of Foreign Languages (Burmese: နိုင်ငံခြားဘာသာတက္ကသိုလ် (မန္တလေး)) [nàɪɰ̃ŋàɰ̃dʑá bàðà ʔətʰúbjṵ tɛʔkəθò (máɰ̃dəlé)]), located in Mandalay, is one of two specialized universities for the study of foreign languages in Myanmar.

The university is located on the 62nd Street, between 22nd and 23rd Streets, Aungmyethazan Township, Mandalay. A total of over 1,600 students from Upper Myanmar and foreign countries study various languages at this university. The university is one of the two language universities in Myanmar alongside Yangon University of Foreign Languages.

== Majors ==
The university offers Master of Arts program, full-time four-year bachelor's degree programs run by Ministry of Education, and part-time diploma programs (Diploma in English and Post graduate Diploma in English Program run by Centre of Human Resource) in the study of several Asian and European languages.

Languages that are currently studied at this university are:

- English,
- Chinese,
- Japanese,
- French,
- Korean,
- German,
- Russian,
- Thai, and
- Burmese for international students.

== Gallery ==
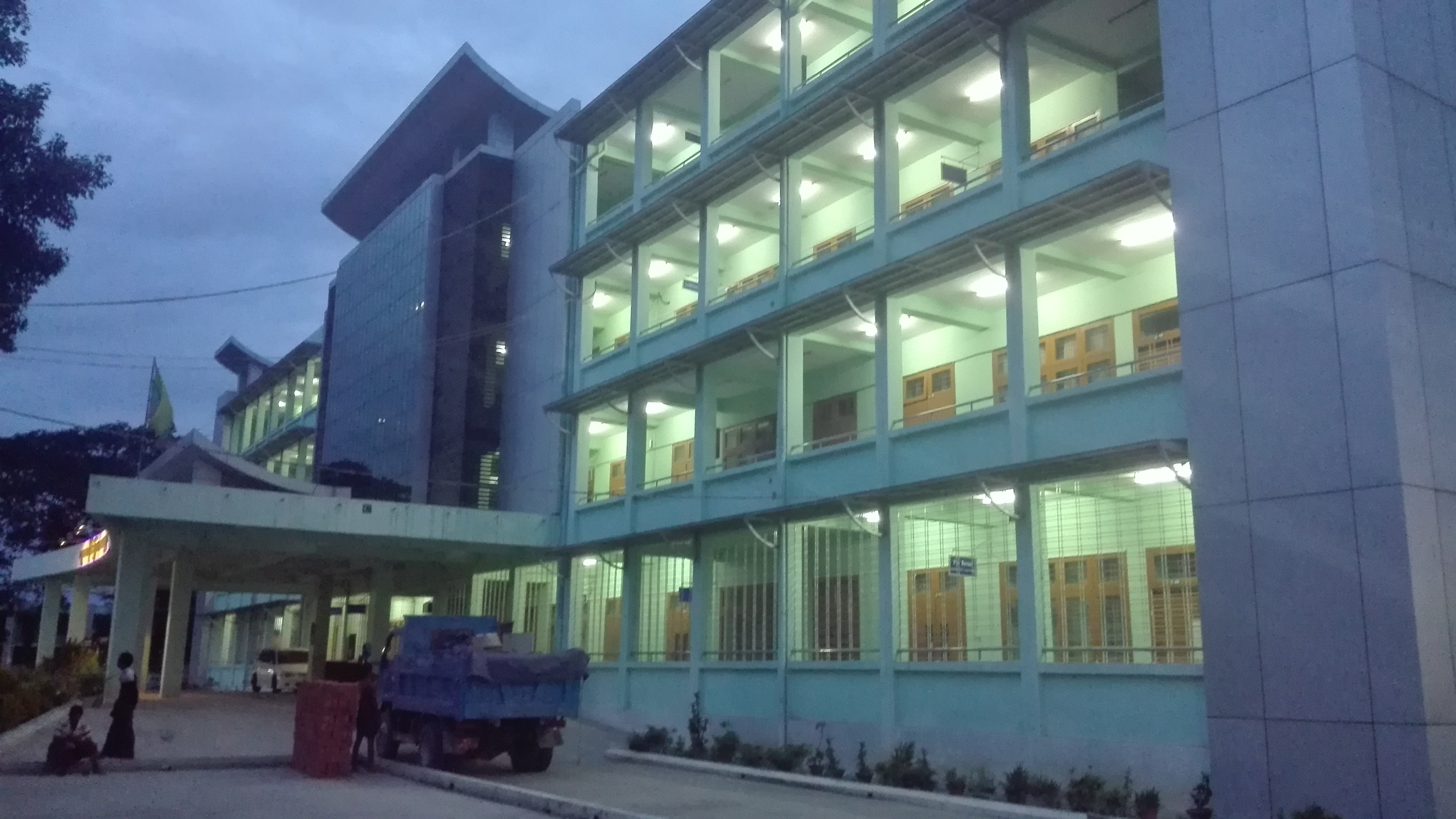
Campus of the University of Foreign Languages, Mandalay

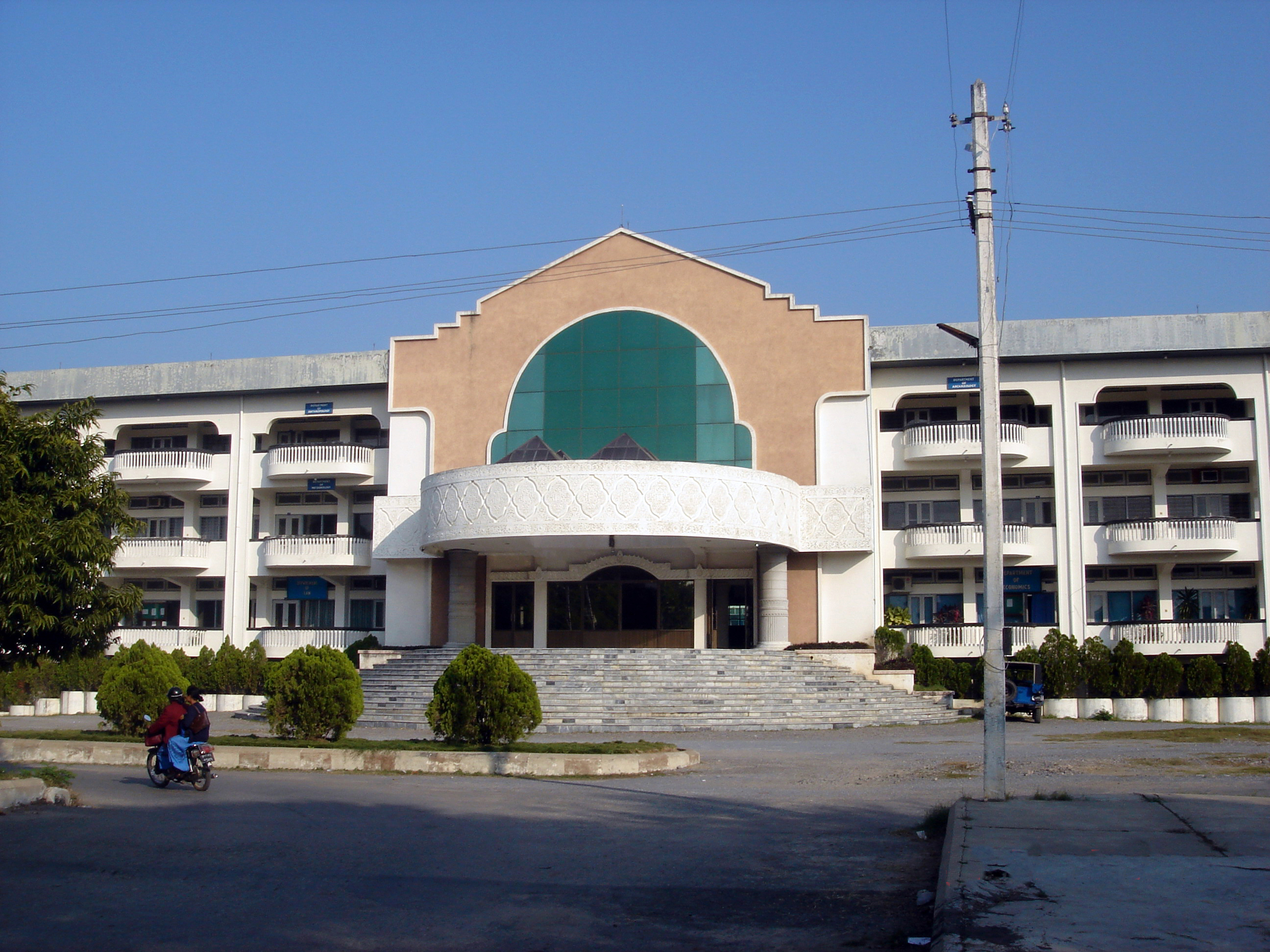
The former building in Mandalay University

== See also ==
- Yangon University of Foreign Languages
