= SEAMEO SPAFA =

- Company type: Non-profit Organisation
- Industry: Southeast Asian Archaeology and Fine Arts
- Founded: 1985
- Headquarters: Bangkok, Thailand
- Area served: Training/workshop; conference/seminar; information dissemination; library documentation services; personnel exchange related to Southeast Asian archaeology and fine arts in: Brunei; Cambodia; Indonesia; Laos; Malaysia; Myanmar; Philippines; Singapore; Thailand; Timor Leste; Vietnam and beyond
- Key people: Dr. Hatthaya Siriphatthanakun, Centre Director
- Website: http://www.seameo-spafa.org/

The SEAMEO Regional Centre for Archaeology and Fine Arts or SPAFA is a Southeast Asian inter-governmental collaboration centre on cultural heritage research and conservation, part of the Southeast Asian Ministers of Education Organization (SEAMEO). The centre was established in 1985. It is hosted by the Government of Thailand. The main objective of the Centre is to promote professional competence, awareness, and preservation of cultural heritage in the fields of archaeology and fine arts in Southeast Asia.

== History ==
In 1971, Cambodia (then known as Khmer Republic) was accepted as a member of the Southeast Asian Ministers of Education Organization (SEAMEO). It was in this same year, SEAMEO launched the Applied Research Center for Archeology and Fine Arts (ARCAFA) in Phnom Penh, Cambodia. The goal of ARCAFA was to discover and preserve the cultural heritage of Southeast Asia. Due to the Civil War in Cambodia, SEAMEO transferred ARCAFA's base to Thailand in 1973.

In March 1978, SEAMEO re-established ARCAFA as SEAMEO Project in Archaeology and Fine Arts thereby creating the acronym SPAFA. Being a project, the SPAFA organizational structure consisted of a Coordinating Unit which was based in Bangkok, and a network of Sub-Centres established in the participating member countries.

From 1978 to 1981, SPAFA launched its First Development Plan with only three member countries: Indonesia, the Philippines and Thailand. The plan focused on the restoration and preservation of ancient monuments, prehistory, and underwater archaeology.

In 1981, SPAFA became a permanent project and in its Second Development Plan, which covered the five years from 1981-1986, the programs in fine arts activities were included. Stress was given to the promotion of the understanding and appreciation of the rich cultural heritage of the region. The plan emphasized archaeological researches as well as researches dealing with documentation of the vanishing forms of traditional arts, both creative and performing arts, and the continuance of programs on preservation and conservation of surviving artifacts which abound in the region.

Arising from the needs expressed by the member states through visits and surveys by the working team to prepare the project personnel, it was decided that the nature of activities of SPAFA would be in five areas; i.e.

1. Training
2. Seminar and conferences
3. Research and development
4. Personnel exchange
5. Library and documentation. It was also decided that information about the project activities as well as academic and professional knowledge should be disseminated through publication of a journal entitled SPAFA Digest, and the proceedings of workshops and seminars. These information materials are distributed to scholars, researchers and those interested in archaeology, history and fine arts, within the region as well as outside.

The Project achieved its goals successfully and was well received by SEAMEO member states, SEAMEO associated member countries, donor countries and international organizations having similar purpose such as UNESCO, ICOM, ICCROM, and so on. Contributions of books for the library, and fellowships were received from France, the Netherlands and the Bangkok Bank, Thailand. The works of the Co-ordinating Unit and the Sub-Centres network were duly recognized.

In 1984, SPAFA began to work out its future plan which would enable it to play a bigger role along with other SEAMEO Centres for improvement of the quality of life of the peoples in Southeast Asia. The program and activities were to be strengthened by reconstituting SPAFA into a Regional Centre.

In 1985, at the SEAMEO Council's Twentieth Conference in Manila, the idea to turn SPAFA from a Project into a Regional Centre was endorsed by the SEAMEO Council, and the Government of Thailand agreed to host the new Regional Centre, which would be called the SEAMEO Regional Centre for Archaeology and Fine Arts. The acronym SPAFA, however, was maintained because of its well established recognition.
