= All Burma Federation of Student Unions =

- Abbreviation: ABFSU
- Formation: May 8, 1936; 90 years ago
- Founder: Aung San
- Founded at: Rangoon University
- Website: abfsu.org
- Formerly called: All Burma Students Union

The All Burma Federation of Student Unions (ABFSU) (Burmese: ဗမာနိုင်ငံလုံးဆိုင်ရာကျောင်းသားသမဂ္ဂများအဖွဲ့ချုပ် (ဗကသ)) is a left-wing umbrella organization for student unions in Burma (also Myanmar). It has played a prominent role in the country’s political history, particularly in the struggle for independence and for democracy, from the period of British colonial administration through successive eras of military rule in Myanmar.

The ABSFU has not been legally recognized by the government since the 1960s and has operated as a shadow organization. During the 2007 Saffron Revolution, the ABSFU was unofficially re-established by a new generation of student leaders, and in 2016, the organization split into two groups, commonly referred to as the "New" and "Old" ABSFU.

== History ==
The All Burma Federation of Student Unions (ABFSU) emerged from the need for a nationwide student organization, as the University Students' Union (Ta-Ka-Tha), also known as Rangoon University Students' Union (RUSU), represented only students of Rangoon University. Consequently, the ABFSU was officially established following a resolution adopted at the First All-Burma Student Conference, held in Rangoon on 8 May 1936, and its first chair was U Raschid.

Over time, the group's interests have changed numerous times. From its inception in the 1936–37 until 1949–50, the organization was known as the All Burma Students Union (ABSU). However, starting from the 1951–52, the name was changed to the All Burma Federation of Student Unions (ABFSU).

During the 1300 Revolution in 1938, a major student strike led by the ABFSU and the RUSU decisively fought against colonialists, working in concert with a large-scale workers' strike. The revolution saw the tragic death of student leader Bo Aung Kyaw, and students were also among the 17 martyrs who fell in Mandalay. Under the leadership of the ABFSU, student steel militias emerged in colleges across Burma. Members of these student militias later participated in the formation of the Burma Independence Army and the Burma Defence Army. The ABFSU also led the formation of student unions nationwide. On February 12, 1947, ABFSU leader Myoma Than Kywe joined Aung San and other ethnic leaders at the Panglong Conference as a representative of the ABFSU.

Following 1950, Communist-affiliated groups operating under the banner of various "fronts" came to dominate the Ba-Ka-Tha movement, and when the Communists went underground (took to the jungle), the paths of Ba-Ka-Tha leaders diverged, with some following them into the jungle, some being killed in government attacks, and others later becoming government ministers; between 1945 and 1958, numerous Ba-Ka-Tha (All Burma Federation of Student Unions) factions emerged, including Ba-Ka-Tha Headquarters, Ba-Ka-Tha Underground (Jungle), Ba-Ka-Tha League, Ba-Ka-Tha "Clean" (Thant-shin), the Ba-Ka-Tha Ko Ko Gyi and Ko Ko Lay Group, Ba-Ka-Tha DSO (Democratic Students Organization), the Federation of Ba-Ka-Tha, and the New Federation of Ba-Ka-Tha.

The ABFSU became active in campaigning for education reforms. During the Sixth Conference of the ABFSU in 1960, the so-called ‘five policies’, and ‘three flags’ of the organization were adopted, which have been fundamental in the creation of Democratic Centralism within the organization.

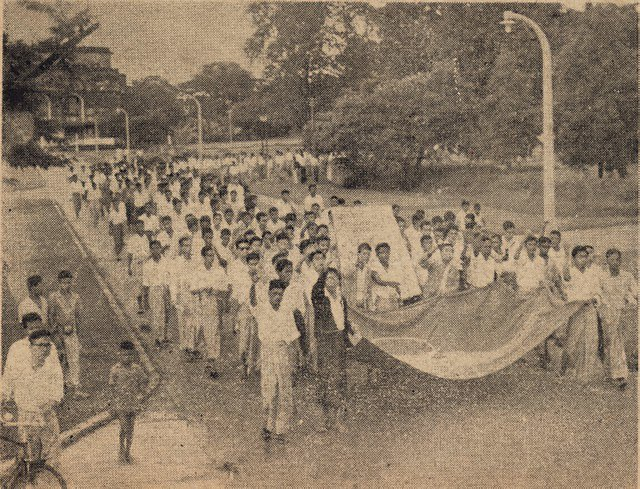
7 July Student Uprising.

Burma's fledgling democratic process came to a halt in 1962 when General Ne Win staged a coup d'etat in which hundreds of protesting students were killed. The turbulent political situation since that time, characterised by kleptocratic, socialistic and paranoid authoritarian rule, has forced ABFSU and its members underground on a number of occasions.

Following the military coup, university students began protesting against the new government. In response, Ne Win's administration quickly imposed repressive new dormitory rules on the student body. The students and their unions vehemently opposed these regulations, leading to protests that culminated in the 7 July Student Uprising on July 7, 1962. At that time, the student union leaders were Ko Ba Swe Lay as President of the RUSU and Ko Thet as President of the ABFSU. The military government completely abolished the legal status of both the ABFSU and the RUSU. Between 3:30 and 4:00 AM on July 8, the Student Union building was demolished with dynamite. During the rule of the military government led by General Ne Win, many ABFSU members and student leaders from across the country were imprisoned as political detainees and subjected to torture and exile, including being sent to Coco Islands.

In 1988, amid widespread civil unrest and mass pro-democracy demonstrations in Rangoon, the All Burma Federation of Student Unions (ABFSU) publicly re-emerged under the leadership of prominent dissident Min Ko Naing (a nom de guerre meaning "conqueror of kings"). The organization played a key role in coordinating the nationwide protests that culminated in the 8888 Uprising.

During this period, ABFSU leaders held serious internal discussions to determine the future direction of the movement. They ultimately adopted a three-pronged strategy: maintaining semi-underground networks, establishing a political party, and engaging in armed resistance. In pursuit of these goals, thousands of students, youth, and intellectuals fled to border areas near Thailand, India, China, and Bangladesh. On 1 November 1988, the All Burma Students' Democratic Front (ABSDF) was established on the Myanmar–Thailand border.

Since 1990, the ABFSU has thrown its support behind the National League for Democracy (NLD), Burma's foremost political party, which won a landslide victory in the general election of that year. The generals were not prepared to hand over power, however, and instead chose to place the party leader, Aung San Suu Kyi, under house arrest. Some within the ranks of Burma's student protestors have criticized the NLD for not implementing a strategy for taking control after the 1990 elections and, despite overwhelming support, allowing the Generals to continue acting with impunity.

During the 2007 Saffron Revolution, Kyaw Ko Ko emerged as a prominent student leader and played a key role in the re-emergence of the ABFSU. He was jailed several times for his involvement in the movement. After being released from prison, he became chair of the ABFSU following its re-establishment.

On 9 May 2012, Aung San Suu Kyi met with leaders of the ABSFU and told them that she would help, within the law, to secure the organization’s legal recognition.

In May 2012, the All Burma Federation of Student Unions was actively campaigning to rebuild its historic student union building on the University of Yangon campus, which had been destroyed by General Ne Win in 1962. The nationwide student union sought official permission and planned to collect signatures from the public to submit a request to President Thein Sein on 8 July, the anniversary of the building’s destruction.

=== Internal split ===
Kyaw Ko Ko, along with other senior student leaders such as Min Thway Thit and Phyo Phyo Aung, split from the ABFSU and remained leaders of the ABSFU (Old). A new generation of student activists founded a new ABSFU. At the pre-student body conference held in Hpa-An in 2016, Thant Nyi Nyi Win was elected chair of the ABFSU (New), while Wai Yan Phyo Moe was elected vice-chair.

On 20 July 2019, members of the ABFSU staged a protest at Yangon University during a visit by State Counsellor Aung San Suu Kyi. The demonstrators presented four key demands: addressing frequent incidents of sexual harassment against female students, easing restrictive dormitory regulations, releasing students who had been arrested for participating in the recent "Seven July" march, and securing the release of Too Wai Yan, a ninth-grade student from Aung Thabyae village in Mandalay Region.

In the aftermath of the 2021 Myanmar coup d'état, the ABFSU has been active in anti-junta movements. From 2021 to 2024, over 60 members, including vice-chair Wai Yan Phyo Moe, have been arrested, and 16 have died. In March 2024, the ABFSU held its 8th Congress, at which it expanded its Central Organizing Committee to include 21 members. The ABFSU staged protests and hung political banners in various locations. Some members joined anti-junta armed forces operating in the jungle, while others continued their political activism in exile, including in countries such as Thailand.

On 15 June 2025, the ABFSU (New) publicly condemned the Civil Service Law enacted by the Committee Representing Pyidaungsu Hluttaw (CRPH), arguing that it was unacceptable both legally and politically.

On 6 January 2026, the ABFSU (New) and several civil society organizations issued a joint statement strongly condemning the U.S. military action against Venezuelan President Nicolás Maduro. The statement denounced the U.S. operation as a violation of international norms and characterized it as imperialist or fascist aggression, expressing solidarity with people globally who resist such actions.

== Criticism ==
Following an internal factional split, the reconstituted ABSFU (New) faced criticism for its sustained protests against the National League for Democracy (NLD) administration led by State Counsellor Aung San Suu Kyi. Supporters of the NLD frequently characterized the group's members as 'crabs' — a pejorative metaphor implying that they walked 'sideways' or were politically contrary, rather than straightforward in their support of the civilian government.

After the 2021 coup d’état, the organization continued its political activism through statements and received significant backlash for opposing nearly every side. This negative reaction intensified after the ABSFU (New) released a statement opposing the Civil Service Law proposed by the government-in-exile, the CRPH.

In January 2026, the ABSFU (New) was criticized for plans to open a KTV venue to raise funds. As a result, the chair, Aung Pyae Sone Phyo, was removed from his post and later issued an apology.
