= Basic Education High School No. 2 Bahan =

Secondary school in Yangon, Myanmar

Coordinates: 16°49′13.7″N 96°09′25.8″E

Nanyang High School
- အခြေခံ ပညာ အထက်တန်း ကျောင်း အမှတ် (၂) ဗဟန်း

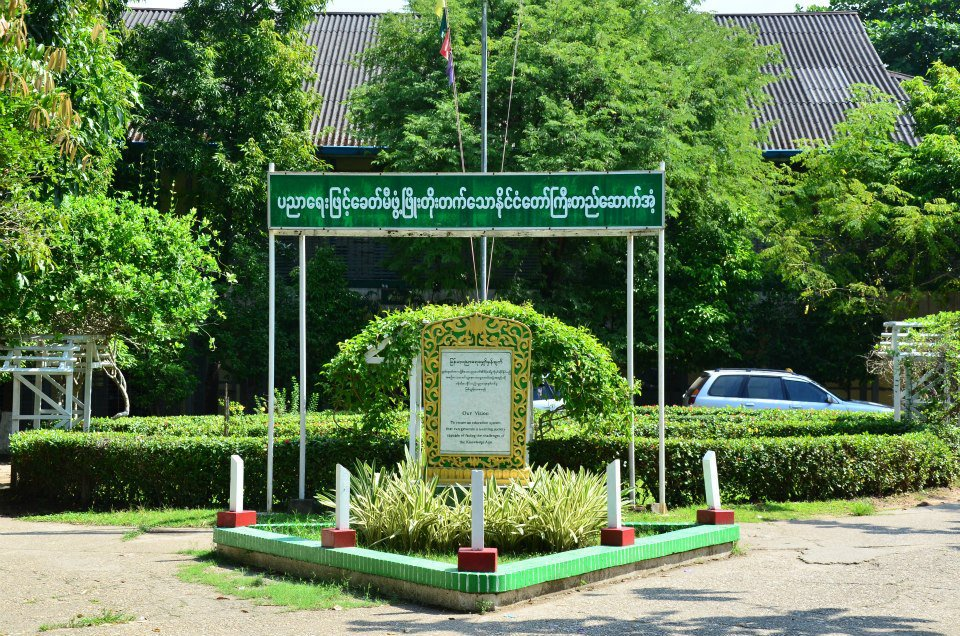
- Basic Education High School No. 2 Bahan

Location
- 162, Kabar Aye Pagoda Road, Bahan; Yangon, Yangon Region; Myanmar

Information
- Type: Public
- School number: 2
- Principal: Dr.Ball Ma Lwin(since 2018)
- Grades: 6-12
- Enrollment: nearly 4000
- Website: www.bahan2nanyan.org

Basic Education High School No. 2 Bahan (Burmese: အခြေခံ ပညာ အထက်တန်း ကျောင်း အမှတ် (၂) ဗဟန်း; abbreviated to အ.ထ.က (၂) ဗဟန်း; also abbreviated as BEHS No. 2 Bahan, commonly known as Nanyan) is a public high school in Bahan township, Yangon, Myanmar. Until the nationalization under Ne Win's government occurred in 1963, it was called Nanyang High School (缅甸南洋中学), one of the elite Chinese schools in Myanmar.

== Student body ==
The school has a large student body, numbering near 4000. The students are spread across six standards or grades, from Grade 6 (formerly fifth standard) to Grade 11 (formerly tenth standard). A high student-to-teacher ratio exists like most of the schools in Yangon.

== Buildings and facilities ==
- 7 two-storied buildings (each having 6-10 classrooms and 2 teachers' common room)
- Multimedia classrooms (Computer and Language Lab)
- Principal's office
- Shwe Nanyan Hall (used for special occasions and ceremonies)
- Physics, Chemistry and Biology Laboratories
- Library
- Canteen
- Assembly hall
- Field
- Netball court
- Tuckshop
