= Chaw Chaw Sein =

Minister of Education of Myanmar since 2025

Academic background
- Education: University of Yangon

Academic work
- Discipline: International relations
- Institutions: University of Yangon; Yangon University of Foreign Languages

Chaw Chaw Sein is a Burmese academic and government official who currently serves as the Union Minister for Education.

== Career ==
She holds a PhD in International Relations from the University of Yangon, with her research often focusing on Myanmar's foreign policy and regional integration.

She spent much of her career at the University of Yangon, where she rose to the position of Professor and Head of the Department of International Relations. In 2020, she transitioned to the Yangon University of Foreign Languages (YUFL), serving as the Pro-Rector and Dean of the Faculty of Social Science. Her scholarly contributions include several publications on Myanmar's political reforms and its strategic role within the Indo-Pacific region.

She is a member of Myanmar ISIS, a leading national think tank under the Ministry of Foreign Affairs. She has represented the country at numerous international forums, including high-level conferences on inclusive education and regional cooperation in Moscow and ASEAN member states. As a senior advisor to various state boards, she has played a significant role in shaping the country's diplomatic training and civil service development. Today, she is a key figure in overseeing the implementation of the National Education Strategic Plan (2021–2030). In July 2025, she was appointed Union Minister for Education.

== Publications ==
=== Chapters ===
- "Myanmar's Perspective on the Indo-Pacific". Indo-Pacific and ASEAN. Taylor & Francis. 2024-12-03. doi:10.4324/9781003559245-8/myanmar-perspective-indo-pacific-chaw-chaw-sein. Archived from the original on 2025-04-29.
