= Myo Thein Gyi =

Burmese politician

His Excellency Dr Myo Thein Gyi
- မျိုးသိမ်းကြီး
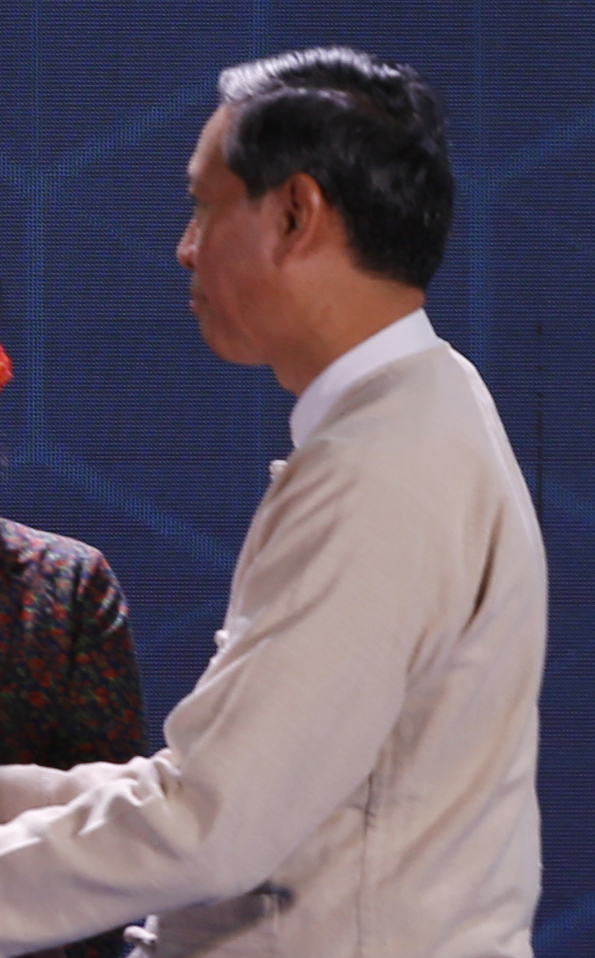
- Myo Thein Gyi in 2020

Minister of Education
- In office 6 April 2016 – 1 February 2021
- President: Htin Kyaw; Myint Swe (acting); Win Myint
- Preceded by: Aung San Suu Kyi
- Succeeded by: Nyunt Pe

Director General of the Department of Myanmar Education Research
- In office December 2012 – 2015

Rector of West Yangon University
- In office 2015 – 6 April 2016

Personal details
- Born: 2 September 1965 (age 61) Yangon, Myanmar
- Education: Yangon University, Technische Universität Berlin; Yangon Institute of Economics
- Cabinet: Win Myint's Cabinet

Myo Thein Gyi (Burmese: မျိုးသိမ်းကြီး; born 2 September 1965) is the former Minister for Education of Myanmar. He previously served as Professor of Mathematics Department, Dagon University, Director General of Department of Myanmar Education Research and Rector of West Yangon University. He became Minister of Education after Aung San Suu Kyi on 6 April 2016. During the 2021 Myanmar coup d'état on 1 February, Myo Thein Gyi was placed under house arrest by the Myanmar Armed Forces.

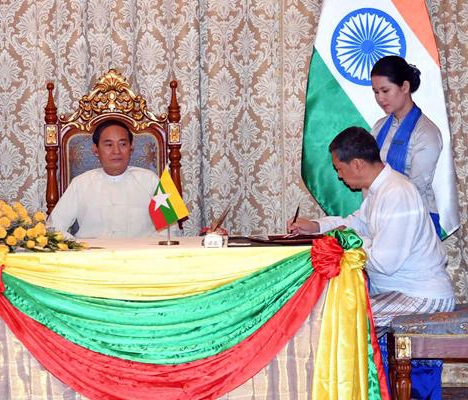
Myo Thein Gyi and President Win Myint

== Degrees ==
He received M.Sc (Mathematics) from University of Yangon in 1992, Dr.rer.nat. (Mathematics) from Technische Universität Berlin, Germany in 1998. He also received Diploma in Education Management from Yangon University of Economics in 2002.

== Career life ==
Active Year	Appointment	Department
1986–2007	Tutor to Associate Professor	Mathematics Department, Yangon University
2007–2009	Professor	Mathematics Department, Dagon University
2009–2010	Pro Rector	Dagon University
2010–2011	Pro Rector	Monywa University
2011–2012	Deputy Director General	Department of Higher Education
July,2012-December,2012	Deputy Director General	Department of Basic Education (1)
December, 2012–2015	Director General	Department of Myanmar Education Research
2015-April,2016	Rector	West Yangon University
April,2016–1 February 2021	Union Minister	Ministry of Education
