= Yangon University of Foreign Languages =

University in Myanmar

- ရန်ကုန်နိုင်ငံခြားဘာသာတက္ကသိုလ် IPA: [jàɰ̃ɡòʊɰ̃ nàɪɰ̃ŋàɰ̃dʑá bàðà tɛʔkəθò]
- Other names: University of Foreign Languages, Yangon
- Former names: Foreign Languages Institution, Institute of Foreign Languages
- Motto: အစဥ်အလာဝင့်ထည် YUFL
- Motto in English: YUFL with its prestigious practices.
- Type: Public
- Established: 16 January 1964; 62 years ago
- Affiliations: Ministry of Education, Department of Higher education
- Academic affiliations: Mandalay University of Foreign Languages
- Rector: Dr. May San Yi
- Faculty: 303
- Location: 119/131, University Avenue Rd., Ward (10), Kamayut Township, West District, Yangon, Yangon Region, Myanmar (Burma); 16°49′29.3″N 96°8′29.7″E
- Campus: Urban
- Language: English, Burmese
- Colours: Blue, red, yellow, white
- Website: www.yufl.edu.mm/demo

The Yangon University of Foreign Languages, also the University of Foreign Languages, Yangon (Burmese: ရန်ကုန်နိုင်ငံခြားဘာသာတက္ကသိုလ် Burmese pronunciation: [nàɪɰ̃ŋàɰ̃dʑá bàðà tɛʔkəθò jàɰ̃ɡòʊɰ̃]), located in Yangon, is a university for the study of foreign languages in Myanmar.

It is one of the two language universities in Myanmar alongside Mandalay University of Foreign Languages.

== History ==
=== Foreign Languages Institution (1964–1972) ===
The Foreign Languages Institution was originally the University of Foreign Languages, which was founded on 16 January 1964. U Ba Myint served as a Principal from 8 January 1964 to 7 February 1965. The Institute started with four language departments: French, German, Japanese and Russian. 53 students were initially enrolled in full-time diploma, part-time diploma, state scholars and language proficiency classes. In 1965, the Chinese Department was established and U Yu Khin became principal on 8 February 1965.

The Institute was relocated to 119–131 University Avenue, Yangon, and U Yu Khin resigned on 30 April 1971, and was replaced by U Win Maung the following day. Italian language programs were offered from 1970 to 1980.

=== Institute of Foreign Languages (1972–1996) ===
The Institute was transferred direct control of Ministry of Education to Department of Higher Education on 15 March 1972. The Foreign Languages Institution was renamed the Institute of Foreign Languages, and U Win Maung resigned on 17 September 1972.

Before the establishment of the language departments, English courses were first offered in 1969 and Myanmar language courses started in 1974 with the faculty members from Yangon University. More language departments were added over the years: the English department was established in 1984, Myanmar in 1985, Thai in 1989, and Korean in 1993.

=== Yangon University of Foreign Languages (1996–present) ===
The institute was given university accreditation and became the Yangon University of Foreign Languages on 2 October 1996. Bachelor's degree and master's degree programs were launched.

The Italian Language Department was reestablished in the 2014–2015 academic year.

The Departments of Linguistics, Oriental Studies, Philosophy, History, and International Studies were established in 1988.

== Notable alumni ==
- Sai Sai Kham Hlaing
- Rebecca Win
- Phway Phway
- Myint Aye
- Wyne Lay
- Ah Moon
- Honey Nway Oo
- Zaw Win Shein
