= Ministry of Education (Myanmar) =

Government ministry of Myanmar

- ပညာရေးဝန်ကြီးဌာန

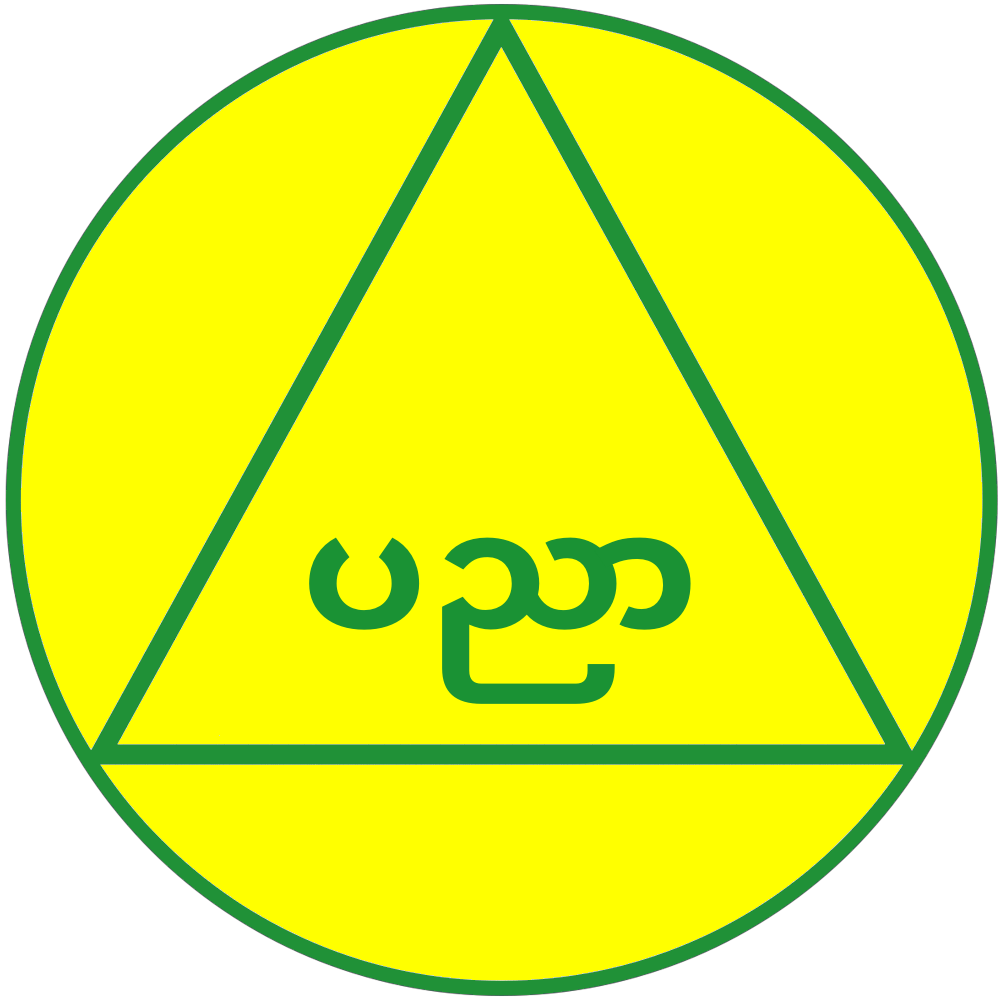

Government overview
- Formed: 1866 (as Educational Department); 1921 (as Ministry of Education)
- Jurisdiction: Myanmar
- Headquarters: Naypyidaw, Myanmar; 19.800635°N 96.119792°E
- Minister responsible: Chaw Chaw Sein, Union Minister
- Child agencies: Department of Higher Education; Department of Basic Education; Department of Human Resources and Educational Planning; Department of Teachers Education and Training; Department of Myanmar Educational Research; Department of Myanmar Nationalities’ Languages; Department of Myanmar Examinations
- Website: www.moe.gov.mm

The Ministry of Education (Burmese: ပညာရေးဝန်ကြီးဌာန, Burmese pronunciation: [pjìɲàjé wʊ̀ɰ̃dʑí tʰàna]; abbreviated MOE) is the Myanmar government ministry responsible for education in Myanmar.

== Brief history ==
The Ministry of Education aims to nurture future oriented advanced science and technology professionals, support national economic development and promote research. In order to reinforce its objectives, Ministry of Education expanded into new Ministry of Science and Technology in 1996. This ministry focused on research and development, intellectual property, standardization, quality assuring, basic infrastructure development, nuclear safety and human resource development. In 2016, five departments from the Ministry of Science and Technology merged with the Ministry of Education with the aim of forming momentum in national development. Currently, the Ministry of Education is responsible for national development related to four categories.

1. Research and development
2. Human resource development
3. Foreign collaboration and co-operation
4. Rural development

On 17 June 2021, the State Administration Council bifurcated the Ministry of Education as the Ministry of Education and the Ministry of Science and Technology.

== Departmental bodies ==
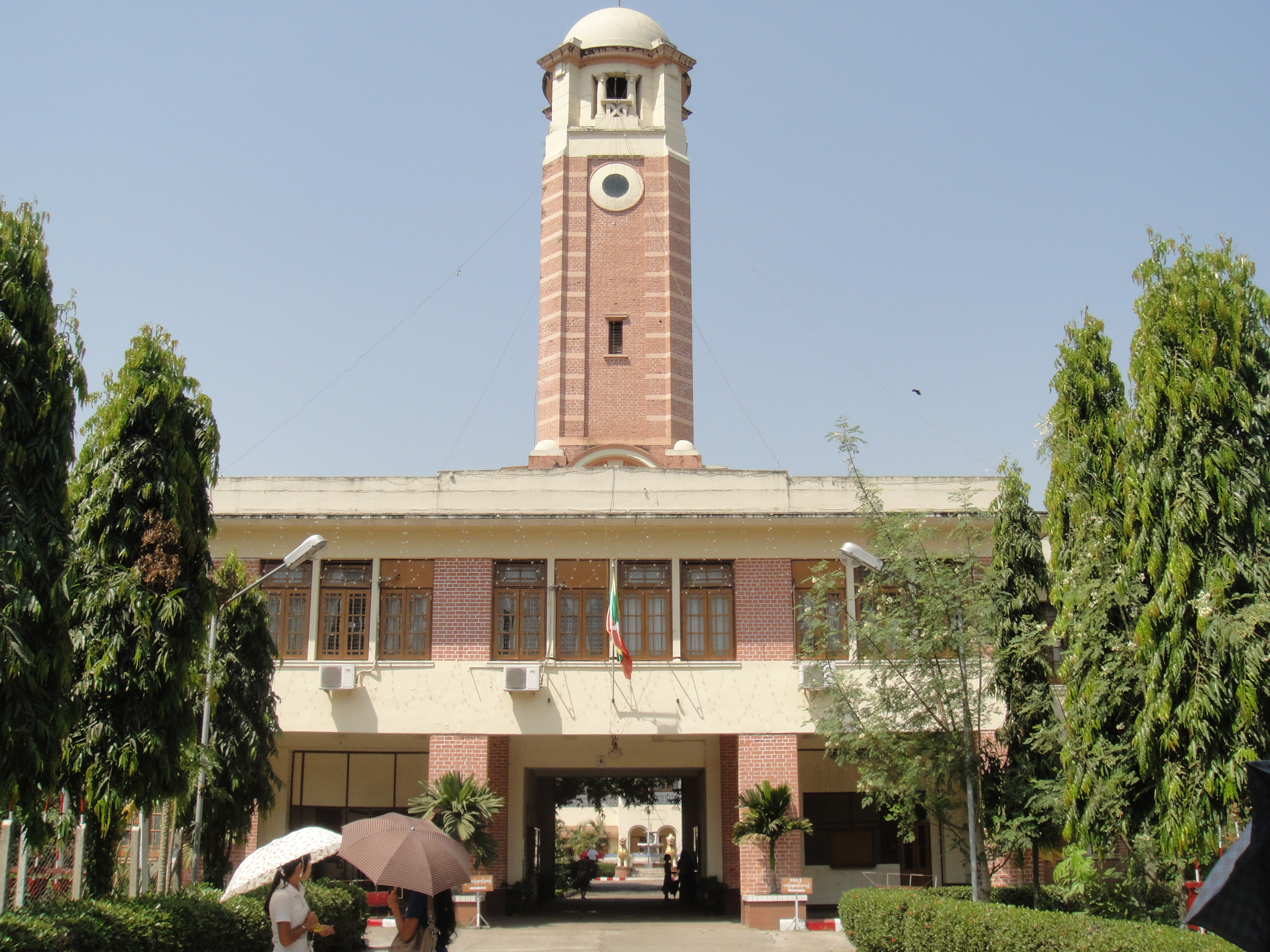
Department of Basic Education No. 3, the Rangoon College (Kyimyindine campus) until 1996

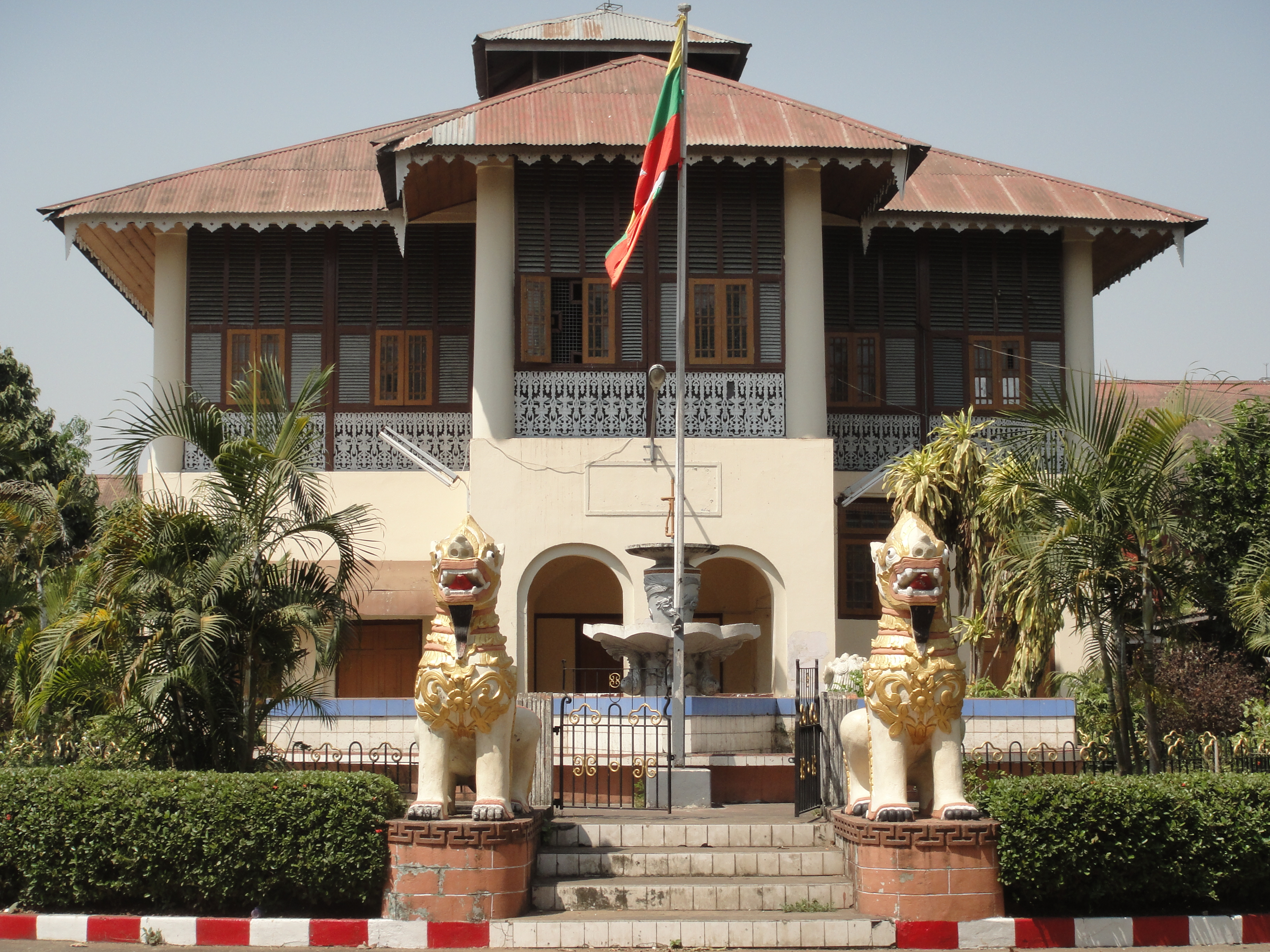
Assembly building of DBE 3

- The Minister's Office
- Department of Higher Education
- Department of Teacher Training
- Department of Human Resources and Educational Planning
- Department of Basic Education
- Myanmar Language Commission
- Department of Myanmar Examinations
- Department of Myanmar Education Research Bureau (MERB)

There are seven departments under the Ministry of Education:

1. Administration staff
2. Department of Higher Education
3. Department of Basic Education
4. Department of Myanmar Language Commission
5. Department of Myanmar Board of Examinations
6. Myanmar Educational Research Bureau (MERB)

The Office Staff of the Ministry of Education is responsible to the Deputy Ministers and the Minister. They supervise the implementation of educational programmes, set the educational policies, are responsible for fiscal planning within the ministry and department personnel and administration of the ministry.

== List of ministers ==
- Dr Ba Maw (1934–1937)
- U Razak (1947)
- Htoon Aung Kyaw
- U Win
- Hla Min
- Maung Gyi
- U Kar (1958–1960)
- Dr. Nyi Nyi
- Col. Hla Han
- Col. Dr. Pe Thein
- Pan Aung
- Than Aung (1997–2004)
- Dr Chan Nyein (2004–2011)
- Dr Mya Aye (minister) (2011–2013)
- Dr Khin San Yee (2014–30 March 2016)
- Aung San Suu Kyi (30 March 2016 – 6 April 2016)
- Dr Myo Thein Gyi (6 April 2016 – 1 February 2021)
- Dr Nyunt Phay (16 February 2021 – 31 July 2025)
- Dr Chaw Chaw Sein (since 31 July 2025)
