= Lingadipa =

- Village
- Location in the Sagaing area and in relation to the Irrawaddy River. Lingadipa (Myanmar)
- Coordinates: 21°54′11″N 95°30′19″E
- Country: Burma
- Region: Sagaing Region
- District: Sagaing District
- Township: Myinmu Township
- Time zone: UTC+6.30 (MST)

Lingadipa is a village in Myinmu Township in the southeast of the Sagaing Division in Burma. It is located west of Myinmu, near Allagappa on the northern bank of the Irrawaddy River. The village was occupied by the British Indian Army on 13–14 February 1944 during World War II.
