= Ywathitgyi =

Ywathitgyi ရွာသစ်ကြီး
- Town
- Location in the Sagaing area and in relation to the Irrawaddy River.
- Coordinates: 21°55′29″N 95°46′46″E
- Country: Burma
- Region: Sagaing Region
- District: Sagaing District
- Township: Myinmu Township
- Time zone: UTC+6.30 (MST)

Ywathitgyi is a small town in Sagaing District in the southeast of the Sagaing Division in Burma (Myanmar). It is located east of Legyi and west of the regional capital of Sagaing. The town lies on the right (northern) side of the Irrawaddy, several miles south of the Ngaizun rocks and the town of Ngaizun. Formerly, when the river was low, Ywathitgyi was the height of navigation for steamers. Ywathitgyi was and is a shipping transfer point for the cotton grown and the cotton products produced in the area. In the early days of the British occupation, Chinese dealers set up cotton brokerages in Ywathitgyi.

== Attractions ==
- 18th century murals at Laung U Hmaw
- Academy for Development of National Groups
- Ywathitgyi yarn mill
