= Hposandin =

- Village
- Location in the Sagaing area and in relation to the Irrawaddy River.
- Coordinates: 21°57′0″N 95°28′0″E
- Country: Burma
- Region: Sagaing Region
- District: Sagaing District
- Township: Myinmu Township
- Time zone: UTC+6.30 (MST)

Hposandin is a village in Myinmu Township in the southeast of the Sagaing Division in Burma. It is located northwest of Allagappa.
