= Letpanzin =

- Town
- Location in the Sagaing area and in relation to the Irrawaddy River. Letpanzin (Myanmar)
- Coordinates: 21°53′22″N 95°50′50″E
- Country: Burma
- Region: Sagaing Region
- District: Sagaing District
- Time zone: UTC+6.30 (MST)

Letpanzin is a small town in Sagaing District in the southeast of the Sagaing Division in Burma. It is located east of Ywathitgyi and west of the regional city of Sagaing and lies near the southern bank of the Irrawaddy River.
