= Paukka, Myinmu =

Paukka
- Village
- Location in the Sagaing area and in relation to the Irrawaddy River.
- Coordinates: 21°59′N 95°41′E
- Country: Burma
- Region: Sagaing Region
- District: Sagaing District
- Township: Myinmu Township
- Time zone: UTC+6.30 (MST)

Paukka is a small village in the southeast of the Sagaing Division in Burma. It is located east by road from Tizaung and the township seat of Sagaing. The village of Legyi lies to the east. It is about 40km west of the city of Sagaing.
