= Legyi, Myinmu =

Legyi
- Village
- Location in the Sagaing area and in relation to the Irrawaddy River. Legyi (Myanmar)
- Coordinates: 21°58′10″N 95°42′53″E
- Country: Burma
- Region: Sagaing Region
- District: Sagaing District
- Township: Myinmu Township
- Time zone: UTC+6.30 (MST)

Legyi is a large village in Myinmu Township in the southeast of the Sagaing Division in Burma. It is located southeast of Paukka and not far from the banks of the Irrawaddy River which the villagers rely on for their paddy fields which lie to the west of the village.

The village was occupied by the 2nd Infantry Regiment of the British Indian Army during World War II,
