= Aungmye Thazi =

- Village
- Location in the Sagaing area and in relation to the Irrawaddy River.
- Coordinates: 22°8′N 95°52′E
- Country: Burma
- Region: Sagaing Region
- District: Sagaing District
- Time zone: UTC+6.30 (MST)

Aungmye Thazi is a village in Sagaing District in the southeast of the Sagaing Division in Burma. It is located northeast of Okhnebin.
