= Sadaung, Sagaing Township =

Sadaung ဆားတောင်
- Town
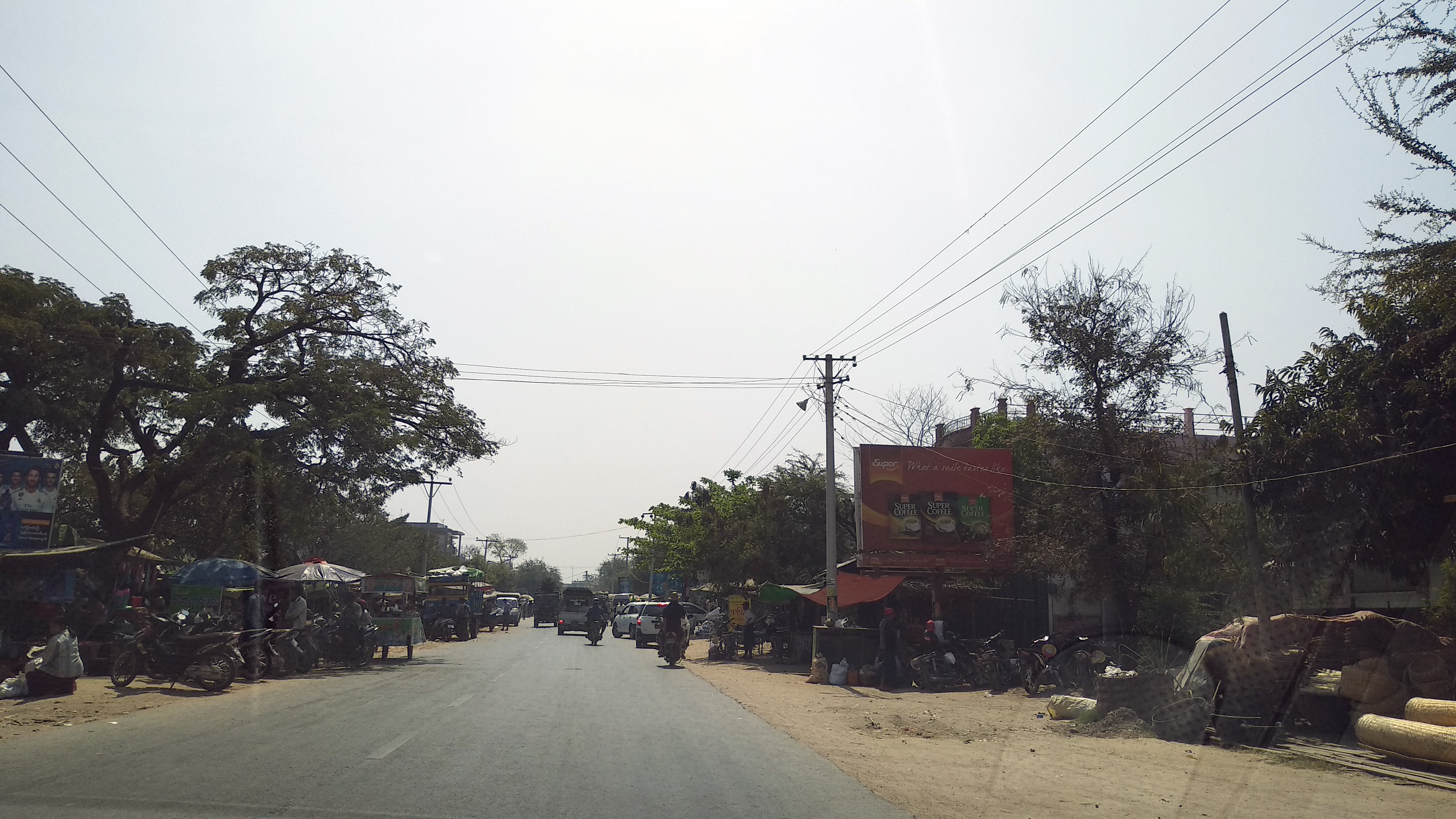

- Location in the Sagaing area and in relation to the Irrawaddy River.
- Coordinates: 22°9′30″N 95°45′40″E
- Country: Myanmar
- Region: Sagaing Region
- District: Sagaing District
- Township: Sagaing Township

Area
  - Total: 27.1 sq mi (70 km^{2})

Population (2023)
  - Total: 10,999
  - Density: 406/sq mi (157/km^{2})
- Time zone: UTC+6.30 (MMT)

Sadaung (Burmese: ဆားတောင်, lit. 'Salt Mountain') is a small town in Sagaing District in the southeast of the Sagaing Division in Burma. It is located north of Okhnebin. The town was elevated to town status on 3 January 2017 through Notification 10/2017 by the General Administration Department.

In 2019, the town had a population of 9,766 and grew to 10,999 people by 2023.
