= Zaw Hlaing Thein =

Burmese politician

- ဇော်လှိုင်သိန်း

Member of the Sagaing Region Hluttaw
- Constituency: Sagaing Township No.1

Personal details
- Born: 13 February 1990 (age 36) Sagaing, Myanmar
- Party: National League for Democracy
- Relations: Thein Htwe (father); Kay Thwe Oo (mother)
- Education: AGTI (Mechanical Power); Certificate of Political Science (KAS Foundation, Germany)
- Occupation: Politician

Zaw Hlaing Thein (Burmese: ဇော်လှိုင်သိန်း; born 13 February 1990) is a Burmese politician who currently serves as a Sagaing Region Hluttaw MP for Sagaing Township No.2. He is a member of the National League for Democracy.

== Early life and education ==
Zaw was born in Sagaing, Myanmar on February 13, 1990. He graduated from Technological University, Sagaing of AGTI (Mechanical Power).

== Political career ==
He joined the NLD in 2011. For the first time, he was appointed as the Sagaing Region Youth charge by the NLD Youth Congress. In 2015, he was served as a member of the General Election Victory Committee. He also served as a member of the Central Youth Leading Committee at the 2017 NLD Youth Conference.

In the 2020 Myanmar general election, he was elected as Sagaing Region Hluttaw MP and elected representative from Sagaing Township no.2 parliamentary constituency.
