= Nyo Mya =

- ညိုမြ
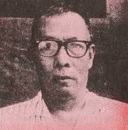
- Born: Thein Tin; 10 April 1914; Thawdawpan village, Chaung-U Township, Sagaing Division, British Burma
- Died: 29 September 1985 (aged 71); Rangoon General Hospital, Rangoon, Burma
- Education: Rangoon University (B.A.)
- Occupation: Poet
- Spouse: Khin Than Nwe (m. 1947)
- Relatives: Tha Zan (father); Shwe Ent (mother)

Nyo Mya (Burmese: ညိုမြ, born Thein Tin) was a famous Burmese writer. He came into prominence by his nationalist article "Hell Hound at Large," which criticised British rulers and mayors in Burma. He was also a friend of Aung San and a member of parliament in the Pyithu Hluttaw.

== Biography ==
Nyo Mya was born Maung Thein Tin on 10 April 1914, to parents Tha Zan (a T.P.S. lawyer), and Daw Shwe Ent in Thawtapan village, a member of Amyint village group, Chaung-U Township. In later years, he was more well known by pen name Nyo Mya.

== Early life ==
Nyo Mya began his education at a primary school headed by Saya Hlaing, and under the Kyatthun Zay Sayadaw U Nyāna. In 1921, he studied his primary education at Monywa's Buddhist High School (State-1) until the third standard (now the 4th grade). In 1923, he transferred to Mandalay Keli (Kal li) School and studied there until he passed sixth standard. In 1929, he returned to Monywa Buddhist High School. In 1932, he passed tenth standard (now known as matriculation standard).

In 1933, Nyo Mya began his undergraduate education at Rangoon University (now Yangon University). In 1938, he obtained a Bachelor of Arts degree in English, graduating with honours. The following year, on 8 August 1939, he relocated to England to study journalism. From there, he went on to study at Northwestern University in the United States (due to university closures in England because of World War II). In 1943, he obtained a Master of Science degree in journalism.

== Professional career ==
From 1935 to 1938, he worked as an editor of Rangoon University's Oway magazine. During his years abroad, he worked as a Burmese language lecturer at Yale University's eastern department, as a Burmese language military news broadcaster, publisher of Burma News (1942–43), adviser of Burma in Washington D.C., chief of Burma department of psychological warfare (1944–45) in Ledo, India.

After he returned to Burma, he published Oway News in 1946. On 1 February 1947, he married with Khin Than Nwe.

He toured England, Germany, Yugoslavia in 1953, Indonesia and Singapore in 1954, and Malaysia, Cambodia, Laos and Vietnam in 1955. He was a chairman of Burma Journalist Association (1957–58) and a member of parliament representing the Monywa Township constituency in 1960. From 1968 to 1974, he published Oway journal. In 1980, he was awarded state honours (2nd grade).

=== Published works ===
Nyo Mya began his writing career at the Rangoon University, by writing novels, poems, articles and essays for the university magazines, Oway and Ganhta Lawka in both Burmese and English. In the 1935–1936 volume of Oway, he wrote "Hell Hound at Large," among the most prominent critical literary pieces of British colonialism in Burma. When Oway News was published at 1946, he wrote many news articles with pen name of Bonkyi Kyaungtha Maung Thumāna.

Some of his famous books include:

- Namkyarnyo (1938)
- Nyo Mya Sarsu (1939)
- Bein D kar, 3 vol. (February 1974)
- Konbaung Sharponedaw (May 1982)
- Ei moe Ei Myae (April 2002)

== Death ==
Nyo Mya died at the Rangoon General Hospital on 29 September 1985.
