= Ngar Shan killings =

2022 killings in Sagaing Region, Myanmar

- Part of the Myanmar civil war (2021-present)
- Location: Ngar Shan, Chaung-U Township, Sagaing Region, Myanmar
- Date: August 30, 2022
- Deaths: 7
- Perpetrators: Ngar Shan village security team: Naing Myo Zaw; Zaw Win Naing; Myat Thura; Naung Naung
- Motive: Suspected junta spies

On August 29, 2022, a local group of People's Defence Force-aligned (PDF) militants led by Naing Myo Zaw arrested and killed seven teenage civilians in Ngar Shan, Chaung-U Township, Sagaing Region, Myanmar. The killings prompted outrage on Burmese social media when they came to light in February 2023, and the perpetrators were arrested by the Pa La Pha, a branch of the PDF.

== Background ==
In February 2021, the Tatmadaw launched a coup against Burmese president Aung San Suu Kyi, installing a military junta. This immediately led to a rebellion by various ethnic armed organizations across the country, many of whom had been waging a low-level insurgency against the government since the 1940s. Many civilians protested against the military in major cities like Yangon and Mandalay, but by March rural civilians formed local militias called the People's Defence Force (PDF), in support of the deposed National Unity Government of Myanmar.

The PDF are widespread throughout the country, and there are township-based and village-based groups of PDF. These groups often work in conjunction with local militias to fight the junta. In August 2022, Naing Myo Zaw was the head of the Ngar Shan village militia.

== Killings ==
On August 29, 2022, Zaw arrested seven civilians in Ngar Shan that he suspected of spying for the junta. The detainees were Myint Mo Aye, 15, Phyu Chit, 17, San San Nge, 19, Zin Zin Maw, 20, Aung Ko San, 15, Thet Paing Oo, 16, and Kayin, 26. The teenagers had entered homes in the village and were scrounging for iron and scrap metal, so villagers reported them to Zaw. The head of the Chaung-U township PDF, Ko Zarni Thein, said that Zaw's group didn't comply with higher-level orders from the township to interrogate the teenagers. Zaw and his men, Zaw Win Naing, Myat Thura, and Naung Naung, confessed to Thein that they had raped the girls and killed the seven teenagers on August 30. The township's PDF arrested Zaw and his men on August 31, and transferred them to the PDF security team Pa La Pha in September.

News of the killings didn't reach Burmese media until February 2023, when photos of the crime were released. The killings caused outrage on Burmese media, with political analysts saying that the killings incentivized junta soldiers to continue their own extrajudicial killings of civilians suspected of being PDF informants. Zaw and his men were arrested by the PDF in February. The NUG released a statement condemning the killings on May 4. The killings are the only known extrajudicial mass killing perpetrated by the PDF or PDF-aligned militants since the start of the civil war.

Zaw escaped PDF detention during a prisoner transport between Pakokku and Chaung-U on July 23, 2023. He was still on the loose as of August 2023. His three compatriots remained in PDF detention.
