= Nilar Lwin =

Burmese politician

Member of the Sagaing Region Hluttaw
- Incumbent
- Assumed office 3 February 2016
- Constituency: Myinmu Township № 2
- Majority: 21,093 votes

Personal details
- Born: Myinmu, Myanmar
- Party: National League for Democracy

Nilar Lwin (Burmese: နီလာလွင်) is a Burmese politician who currently serves as a Sagaing Region Hluttaw member of parliament for Myinmu Township No. 2 Constituency. She is a member of the National League for Democracy.

In the Myanmar general election, 2015, she was elected as a Sagaing Region Hluttaw MP, winning a majority of 21093 votes and elected representative from Myinmu Township No. 2 parliamentary constituency. She is serving as a chairwoman of Sagaing Region Hluttaw Legislative Affairs Committee.
