= Myaung =

Myaung Township
- Township
- Location in Sagaing district

- Location in Sagaing Region

- Location in Burma
- Coordinates: 21°50′N 95°25′E
- Country: Burma
- Region: Sagaing Region
- District: Sagaing District
- Capital: Myaung
- Time zone: UTC+6.30 (MST)

Myaung (Burmese: မြောင် မြို့) is a town in Myaung Township in the Sagaing Region in central Myanmar located on the west bank of the Ayeyarwady River. It is a region between the Rivers of Ayeyarwady and Chindwin.

There are many ancient and historical pagodas, monasteries, and places in Myaung Township. Myaung Township is officially demarcated with the neighbour boundaries of Chaung-U in the north-west, of Myinmu in the east and north east. In the township of Myaung, Kyauk Nagar Mountain is very famous, where very ancient rocky statues like the rocky dragon-shaped statues are found, and the Buddhist Region rich of many pagodas is situated.

Myaung Township is one of the townships which were historically concerned with King Kyansit like Chaung-U Township. There are also many pagodas or Buddhist temples and monasteries of or built by King Kyansittha at the age of Bagan. It is a crowded town since it is located on the west bank of the river. To get there, there is Myaung-Payeinma Road, turning in from the Monywa-Mandalay one.

Myaung is located in the western part of Sagaing District, 14 miles away from and in south-west of Myinmu, at the basin area between two rivers of Ayeyarwady meeting with Chindwin and at the right bank of Ayeyarwady. It has an area of 179 square miles. The rural road of Chaung-U-Ma Yoe Kone pass through the town.

In order to protect the flooding risk, a dam is dammed on North Main Lake called Myauk Inn Ma Kyi. Myinchan-Mandalay ships moored at harbour in the town.

Population of the town was 6,853 people according to the number of census at 1953. There are administration office, police station, public hospital, basic education high school and other official buildings in the town. According to census at 1956, population of the township was 60,079 people. There were 38 fields of headmen at the township ago. It was a township governed by grooms at the age of kings and under the governance of Shwebo Mayor at that time. Then, it was also under Ellakappa mayor. Myaung township was known Paung Myaung Teik ago and it was founded by Bagan King Narapatisithu.
