= Paledan =

- Village
- Location in the Sagaing area and in relation to the Irrawaddy River.
- Coordinates: 21°55′56″N 95°36′7″E
- Country: Burma
- Region: Sagaing Region
- District: Sagaing District
- Township: Myinmu Township
- Time zone: UTC+6.30 (MST)

Paledan is a village in Myinmu Township in the southeast of the Sagaing Division in Burma. It is located just east of Myinmu on the northern bank of the Irrawaddy River.
