= Tizaung =

- Village
- Location in the Sagaing area and in relation to the Irrawaddy River.
- Coordinates: 21°58′N 95°36′E
- Country: Burma
- Region: Sagaing Region
- District: Sagaing District
- Township: Myinmu Township
- Time zone: UTC+6.30 (MST)

Tizaung is a village in the southeast of the Sagaing Division in Burma. It is located about 2 miles northeast of the township centre of Myinmu by road. The settlement of Paukka also lies by road to the east.

Tizaung contains a notable pagoda.
