= Okhnebin =

Marlaetaw
- Village
- Location in the Sagaing area and in relation to the Irrawaddy River.
- Coordinates: 22°4′N 95°48′E
- Country: Burma
- Region: Sagaing Region
- District: Sagaing District
- Township: Sagaing Township

Population
  - Total: 3.673 (this number includes all villages in the tract including Okhnebin).
- Time zone: UTC+6.30 (MST)

Okhnebin is a village in Sagaing District in the southeast part of the Sagaing Division in Burma. It is located northwest of the regional city of Sagaing.
