= University of Co-operative and Management, Sagaing =

Public university in Myanmar

Coordinates: 21°53′56.4″N 95°58′18.0″E

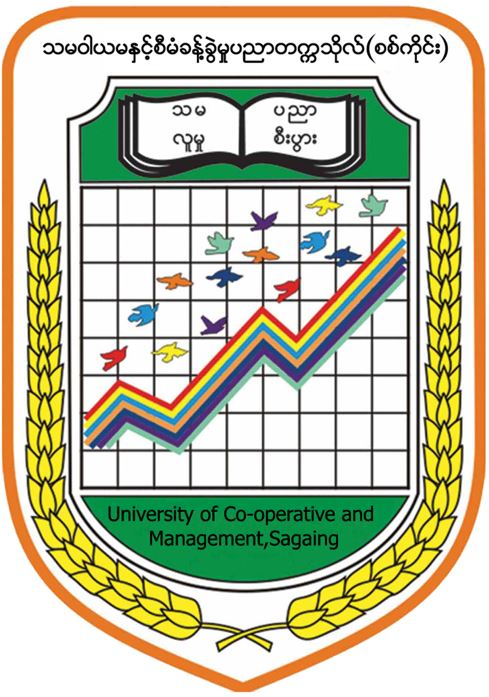
- သမဝါယမနှင့်စီမံခန့်ခွဲမှုပညာတက္ကသိုလ်(စစ်ကိုင်း) University of Co-operative and Management, Sagaing
- Other name: Sagaing Co-operative University
- Motto: "Youth Co-operators today, Leaders in Future."
- Type: Public
- Rector: Dr Ohn Mar San
- Location: Sagaing, Sagaing, Myanmar
- Website: www.ucms.edu.mm

University of Co-operative and Management, Sagaing is a public university in the Sagaing township of Sagaing Division, Myanmar.

The university offers a Bachelor of Business Science (B.B.Sc.) with five specializations, postgraduate diplomas (PGDip) and master's programmes. It accepts 300 students annually for their four-year degree programmes.

The campus is located in the Shwe Thamar Quarter, Sagaing. Sagaing Co-operative University Students' Union claims student right and university's master plan to expand the main road and to build a hostel for students.

== History ==
In 1982, it was established as "Sagaing Co-operative Training School as a compound training school from Chin State, Kachin State and Sagaing Division. In 1996, it was upgraded to a co-operative college. In 2012, President U Thein Sein visited Sagaing and gave a chance to be a special university in Sagaing. The construction of the main building was started as soon as Co-operative University (Sagaing) was recognized by the government.

== Academic Departments ==
- Department of Economics
- Department of Commerce
- Department of Statistics
- Department of Management Studies
- Department of Co-operative Studies
- Department of ICT
- Department of Myanmar
- Department of English
- Department of Mathematics
- Department of Law
- Department of Economic Geography

== Degrees and Diplomas ==
The university offers a bachelor's programme for Business Science (B.B.Sc.) with five specialisations:

- B.B.Sc. (Accounting & Finance)
- B.B.Sc. (Applied Statistics)
- B.B.Sc. (Marketing Management)
- B.B.Sc. (Regional Development)
- B.B.Sc. (Social Enterprise Management)

The university also offers postgraduate diploma courses in these specialisations. Additionally, the following master's programmes are offered by the university:

- Master of Accounting and Finance
- Master of Applied Statistics
- Master of Marketing Management
- Master of Regional Development
- Master of Social Enterprise Management

Moreover, the university is trying to offer Ph.D program courses in Accounting and Finance, Applied Economic and Applied Statistics specialisations. The following degree will be offered by the university:

- Doctor of Philosophy in Accounting and Finance
- Doctor of Philosophy in Applied Statistics
- Doctor of Philosophy in Applied Economics
