= Chaung-U Township =

- Township
- Location in Burma
- Coordinates: 21°57′N 95°16′E
- Country: Burma
- Region: Sagaing Region
- District: Monywa District
- Capital: Chaung-U
- Time zone: UTC+6.30 (MST)

Chaung-U Township (Burmese: ချောင်းဦးမြို့နယ်) is a township in Monywa District of Sagaing Division in Burma. The principal town is Chaung-U.

== Neighbourhood townships ==
The township boundary touches with the boundaries of other townships;Myinmu township is in the east, Myaung township is in the south, Salingyi township is in the west, and Monywa Township is in the north. There is Chindwin river between two townships of Chaung-U and Salingyi as the common boundary.

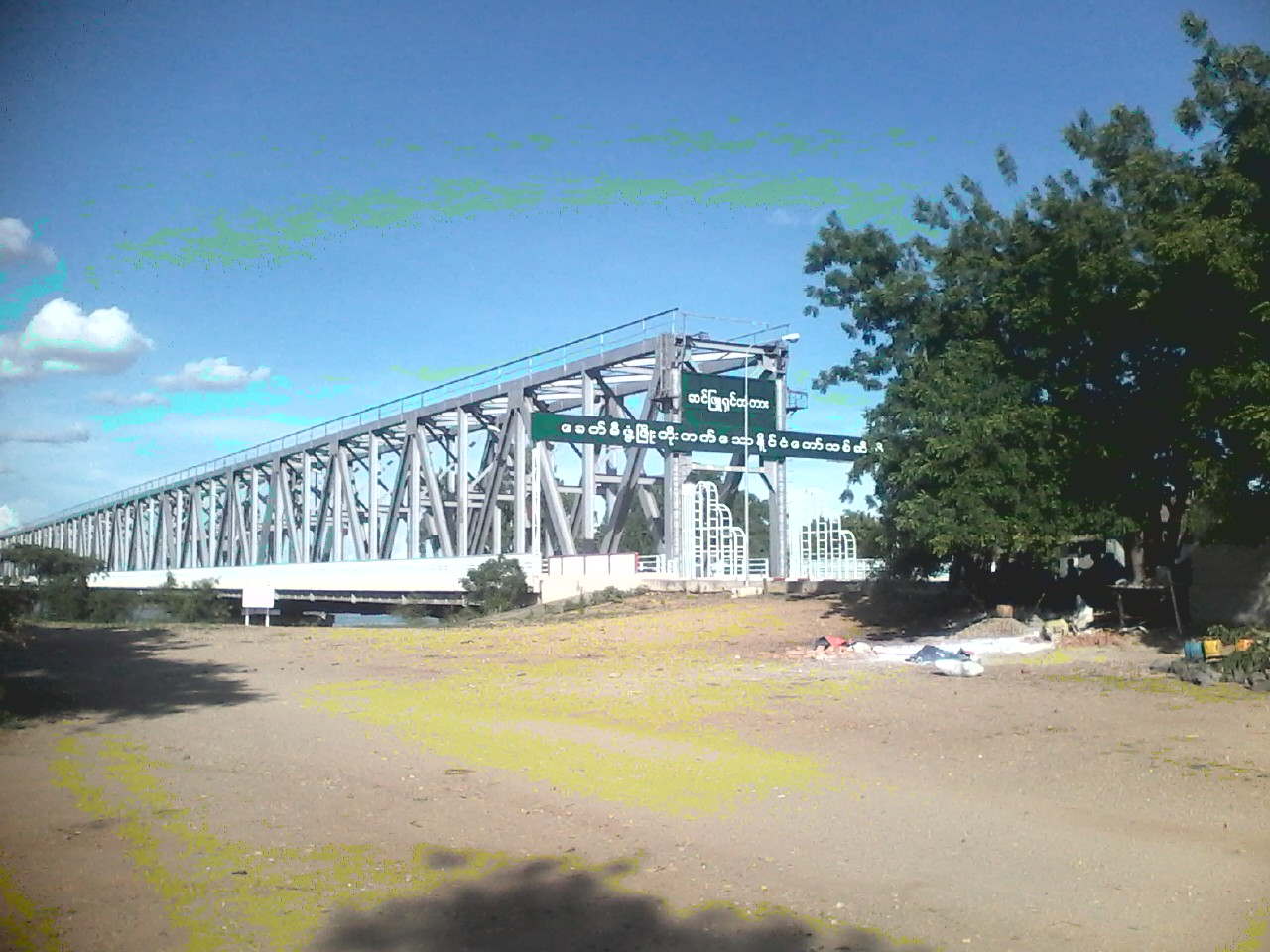
Sin Phyu Shin Bridge (Chaung-U)

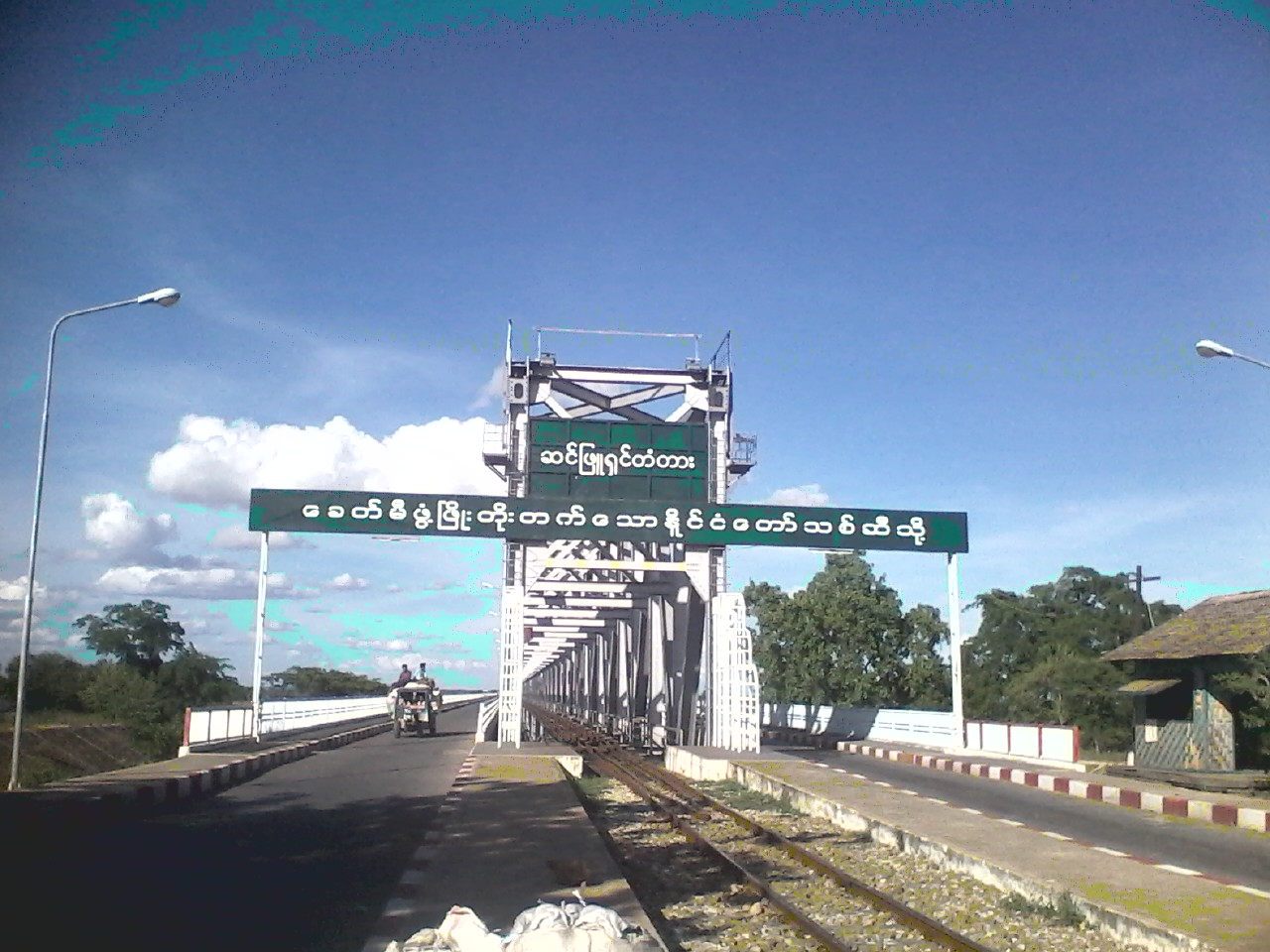
Sin Phyu Shin Bridge for public transportation

== Inside Township ==
=== List of villages ===
The township has got 74 villages. They are below:

1. Aung Chanthar Village (အောင်ချမ်းသာရွာ)
2. Amyint Village Tract (အမြင့်ကျေးရွာအုပ်စု)
3. Butar Village Tract (ဘူတာကျေးရွာအုပ်စု)
4. Balawe Village (ပုလွေကျေးရွာ)
5. Boneto Village (ဘုံတိုကျေးရွာ)
6. Chaungma Village (ချောင်းမကျေးရွာ)
7. Chaungmanar Village Tract (ချောင်းမနားကျေးရွာအုပ်စု)
8. Dapèl Inn Village (တပါယ်အင်းကျေးရွာအုပ်စု)
9. Hlaw Kar Village (လှော်ကားကျေးရွာ)
10. Hman Cho Village Tract (မှန်ချိုကျေးရွာအုပ်စု)
11. Htan Tawkone Village (ထန်းတောကုန်းကျေးရွာ)
12. Htan Taw Kyi Village (ထန်းတောကြီးကျေးရွာ)
13. Htee Kyone Village (ထီးကုန်းကျေးရွာ)
14. Htoo Ni Village (ထူးနီကျေးရွာ)
15. I Ni Village (အိုင်နီကျေးရွာ)
16. Inn Ma Village (အင်းမကျေးရွာ)
17. Kyi kone Village (ကျီကုန်းကျေးရွာ)
18. Khin Mon Village Tract (ခင်မွန်ကျေးရွာအုပ်စု)
19. Kanma Village (ကံမကျေးရွာ)
20. Kan Gyi Village (ကံကြီးကျေးရွာ)
21. Kyauktann Village (ကျောက်တန်းကျေးရွာ)
22. Koetaungkan Village (ကိုးတောင်ကန်ကျေးရွာ)
23. Kinmoontaw Village Tract (ကင်မွန်းတော် ကျေးရွာအုပ်စု)
24. Kalar Kyi Village (ကုလားကြီးကျေးရွာ)
25. Kanzee Village (ကံဇီးကျေးရွာ)
26. Kyaung Sakkyi Village (ကြောင်စပ်ကြီးကျေးရွာ)
27. Kyaung Saklay Village (ကြောင်စပ်လေးကျေးရွာ)
28. Kyak Thun Zay Village (ကြက်သွန်ဈေးကျေးရွာ)
29. Kone Gyi Village (ကုန်းကြီးကျေးရွာ)
30. Kyun Tharyar Village (ကျွန်းသာယာကျေးရွာ)
31. Kyauk Sikkan Village (ကျောက်ဆစ်ကန်ကျေးရွာ)
32. Kone Thar Village (ကုန်းသာကျေးရွာ)
33. Mie Tè Village (မိုင်တဲကျေးရွာ)
34. Myae Ni Kyin Village (မြေနီကျင်းကျေးရွာ)
35. Mahti Thar Village (မထိသာကျေးရွာ)
36. Makyi Dan Village (မကျီးတန်းကျေးရွာ)
37. Makyi Gwa Village Group (မကျီးခွကျေးရွာအုပ်စု)
38. Minkhaung Village (မင်းခေါင်ကျေးရွာ)
39. Minti Village (မင်းတီကျေးရွာ)
40. Myin Myae Village (မြင်းမြေကျေးရွာ)
41. Nagar Bo Village (နဂါးဘိုကျေးရွာ)
42. Nga Shan Village Tract (ငါးယှန်ကျေးရွာအုပ်စု)
43. Nwe Chway Village Tract (နွယ်ခွေကျေးရွာအုပ်စု)
44. Nat Yai Kan Village Tract (နတ်ရေကန်ကျေးရွာအုပ်စု)
45. Nga Lone Tin Village Tract (ငါးလုံးတင်ကျေးရွာအုပ်စု)
46. Ngwe Thar Village (ငွေသာကျေးရွာ)
47. Nyaung Pinthar Village Tract (ညောင်ပင်သာကျေးရွာအုပ်စု)
48. Nyaung Pinhla Village (ညောင်ပင်လှကျေးရွာ)
49. Pè Pyittaw Village (ပဲပြစ်တောကျေးရွာ)
50. Ponenar Maw Village (ပုဏ္ဏားမော်ကျေးရွာ)
51. Pauktaw Village (ပေါက်တောကျေးရွာ)
52. Shweku Village Tract (ရွှေကူကျေးရွာအုပ်စု)
53. Shan Htoo Village (ရှမ်းထူးကျေးရွာ)
54. Shwe Hlay Village Tract (ရွှေလှေကျေးရွာအုပ်စု)
55. Shwe Kyin Village (ရွှေကျင်ကျေးရွာ)
56. Sin Myae Village (ဆင်မြေကျေးရွာ)
57. Suelay Village Tract (ဆူးလေကျေးရွာအုပ်စု)
58. Shwedar Kya Village (ရွှေဒါးကျကျေးရွာ)
59. Ta Line Kya Village (တလိုင်းကျကျေးရွာ)
60. Than Pinkan Village Tract (သန်းပင်ကန်ကျေးရွာအုပ်စု)
61. Taung Philar Village (တောင်ဖီလာကျေးရွာ)
62. Taw Kyaung Kyi Village Tract (တောကျောင်းကြီးကျေးရွာအုပ်စု)
63. Tazaung Village (တံဇောင်း(တန်ဆောင်း)ကျေးရွာ)
64. Thaw ta Pan Village (သောတာပန်ကျေးရွာ)
65. Taw Kyaung Lay Village Tract (တောကျောင်းလေးကျေးရွာအုပ်စု)
66. Taung Inn Village (တောင်အင်းကျေးရွာ)
67. Thone Pan Hla Village (သုံးပန်လှကျေးရွာ)
68. Ywar Thar Aye Village (ရွာသာအေးကျေးရွာ)
69. Yar Kyi Village (ယာကြီးကျေးရွာ)
70. Ywar Htinn+Pauk Inn Village (ရွာထင်+ပေါက်အင်း ကျေးရွာ)
71. Ywar Thit Village (ရွာသစ်ကျေးရွာ)
72. Ywar Thit Village (ရွာသစ်ကျေးရွာ)
73. Ywar Taw Lay Village (ရွာတော်လေးကျေးရွာ)
74. Wahyar Village Tract (၀ယာကျေးရွာအုပ်စု)

=== International highway route ===
==== Yar Kyi ====
Yar Kyi (ယာကြီးကျေးရွာ), also Yar Gyi, Yargyi and Yargi village, is an important stopover on the India–Myanmar–Thailand Trilateral Highway. On 11 April 2018, Yagyi-Kalewa section was finally awarded to Punj Lylloyd, to be completed in 3 years by April 2021 for Rs.1,177 crore in Engineering, procurement, and construction (EPC) mode under a special purpose vehicle. It will be an international standard highway with two-lane in each direction with paved shoulders, entailing 6 truck stops, 20 bus stops and passenger shelters, 1 rest area, strengthening of 4 existing major bridges and 9 existing minor bridges, and construction of 3 new major bridges and 2 new minor bridges.

==== Chaungma ====
Chaungma (also Chaung Ma) village (ချောင်းမကျေးရွာ) is an important stopover on the India–Myanmar–Thailand Trilateral Highway. It is 64.4 km (40.0 mi) from Yargyi (Yar Kyi).

=== Historical Villages in the Township ===
There are many historical villages, quarters and monasteries around the township. Among them, Nwe Chway, Pè Pyittaw, Khin Mon, Amyint and Hman Cho are the most distinct villages, for instance.

==== Nwe Chway Village ====
It is a historical ancient village that is concerned with King Kyansit's history. It was a place where Prince Kyansit saw some creepers as the blessing omen for him. When he became a king, he founded the village. He called it "Nwe Chway village"; and also built the pagodas.

==== Pè Pyittaw Village ====
It is also a village where was founded and named by King Kyansit. There are still historical pagodas in the village.

==== Amyint Village ====
It is a historical ancient village. Ago, it was a city when Innwa and Konbaung dynasties governed the country. During the age of Innwa, it was an important city for Innwa Kings and their armies. King Swar Saw Kè was the governor of the city before he became a king. When Kone Baung Kings governed the country, the mayor Min Lappha Wah was famous. Venerable Abbot Ven. Nandar Siri was also born in the village. Amyint has many historical ancient pagodas, monasteries and other proofs or things.

=== Historical Urban Quarters ===
There are many historical urban quarters in the town. For instance, Sandaw Sware, A Shaema Oak, A Naukma Oak and Ye Hlay quarters are the most distinct historical urban quarters. They were historically concerned with King Kyansit.

=== Historical Monasteries ===
Around the township, there are many historical ancient monasteries and pagodas. In the urban quarters, there are ancient pagodas that were built by King Kyansit. For example, Vin Khaya (Win Kha Ya) Pagoda in Makyi Taw Monastery and Htee Hlaing Shin Pagoda in Htee Hlaing Shin Monastery are those pagodas that were built by King Kyansit. Many other historical ancient pagodas and monasteries are found spreading around the township.

== Popular Places of Attractions ==
- The Noble Handprint of Lord Buddha and Lattawyar Pagoda in Taw Chaung Lay
- Yadana Shwe Gu Kyi Pagoda in Chaung-U
- Vin kara Pagoda and Makyi Taw monastery in Chaung-U
- Shwe Pyi Thar Pagodas in Chaung-U
- Kyauk Myin Mountain Peak Monastery in the township
- Stone Pagoda and the ninety-nine springs on Nwe Chway Hills
- Shwe Sigon Pagoda and other monasteries in Khinmum
- Pagodas and monasteries in A Myint old city(A Myint village)
- Sin Phyu Shin Bridge
- Nwe Chway Dam
- Pauk Inn Lake

== Economy ==
- Agriculture
- Trades
- Transportation Business
- Courses
