= U Wisara Monument =

Statue of U Wisara in Yangon, Myanmar, erected in 1943

Coordinates: 16°47′42″N 96°08′49″E

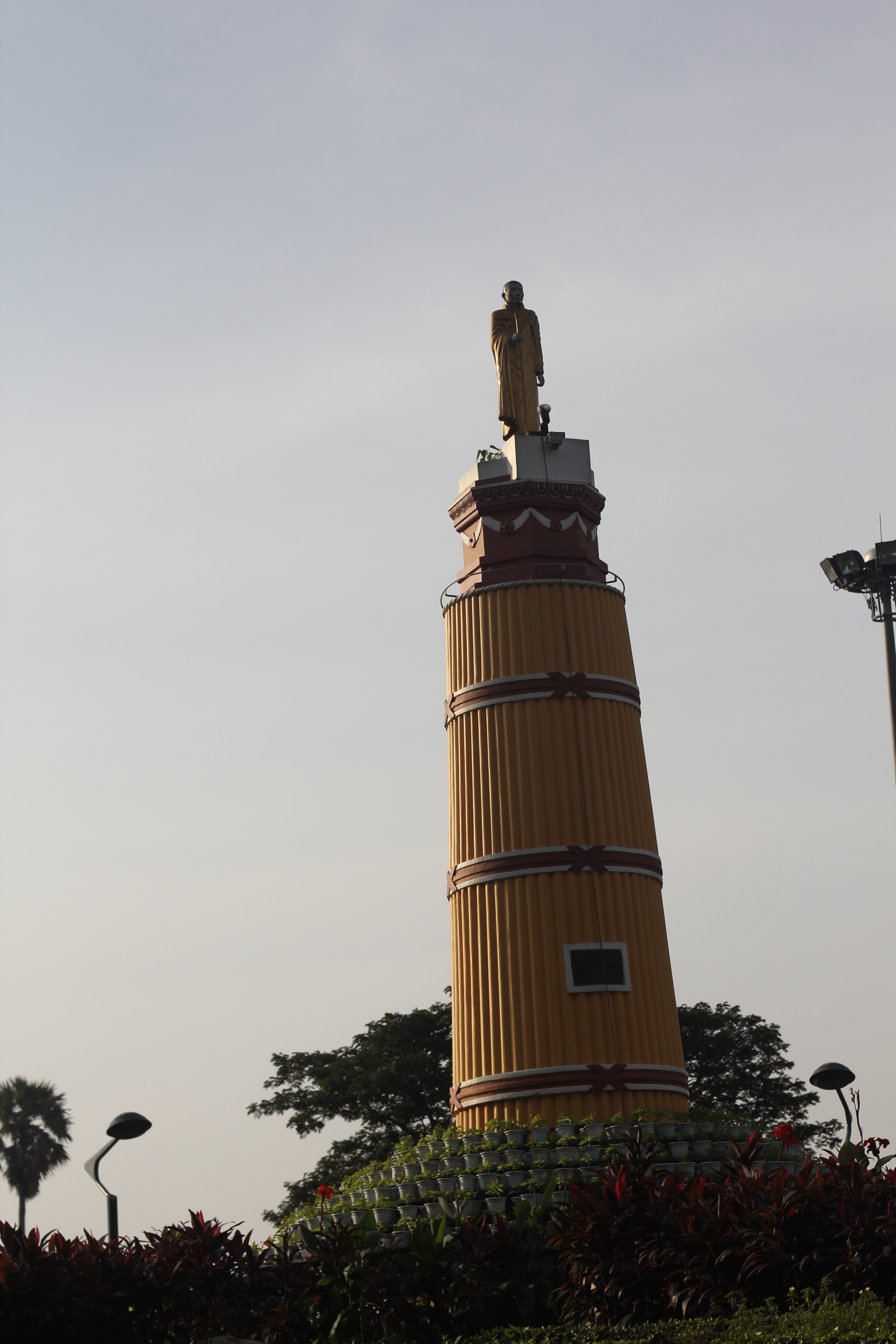
U Wisara Monument

U Wisara Monument is a statue of U Wisara in Yangon, Myanmar. It is located directly west of the northwest corner of Kandawmingala Lake on U Wisara Road, and is located several metres southwest of the Shwedagon Pagoda. The statue was erected on August 1, 1943.
