= U Wisara =

Buddhist monk and national hero in Myanmar

- ဦးဝိစာရ
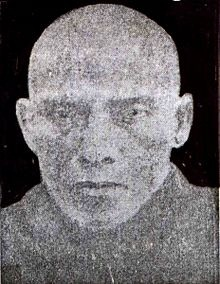
- U Wisara

Personal life
- Born: Hla Kyaw; 24 April 1889; Wednesday, 8th waning of Late Tagu 1250 ME Kanneint village, Chaung-U Township, Sagaing Division, British Burma
- Died: 19 September 1929 (aged 40); Thursday, 2nd waning of Tawthalin 1291 ME Rangoon, British Burma
- Occupation: Buddhist monk

Religious life
- Religion: Buddhism
- School: Theravada
- Monastic name: Vicāra ဝိစာရ

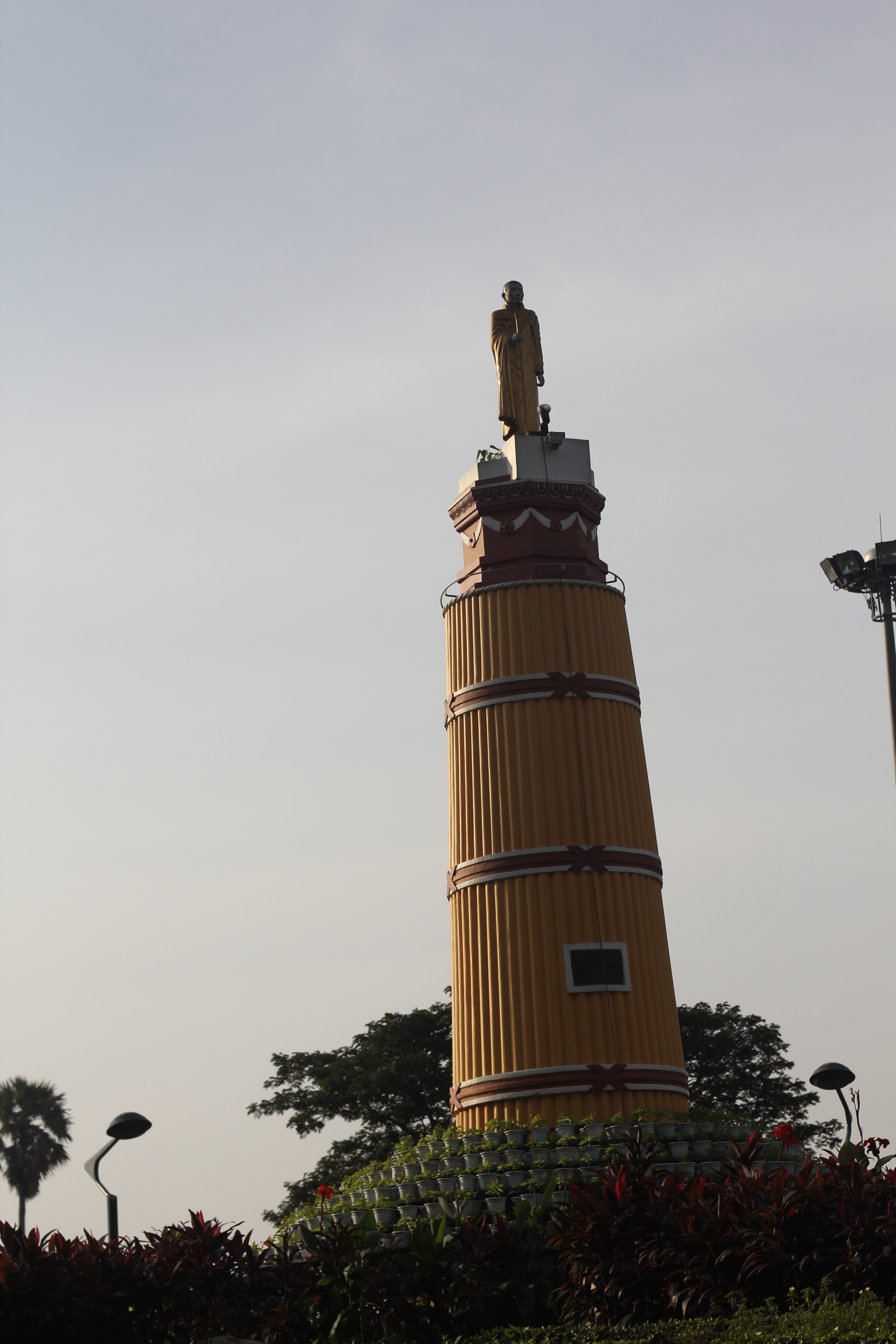
Statue of U Wisara in Yangon

Ven. U Wisara (Burmese: ဦးဝိစာရ, pronounced [ʔú wḭsəɹa̰], Pali: Vicāra; 24 April 1889 – 19 September 1929) was a Burmese Buddhist monk who died in prison after a 166-day hunger strike against the colonial British rule in Burma. The monk had been repeatedly imprisoned and tortured by the colonial government for "inciting sedition", and forced to wear plain clothes and abandon religious observances. His "ultimate sacrifice profoundly moved many Burmese who not concerned themselves with politics before", and galvanized the nascent independence movement. The monk is commemorated today with the U Wisara Road, a major avenue in Yangon, and the U Wisara Monument in Yangon.

== Early life ==
He was born Hla Kyaw (လှကျော်, [l̥a̰ dʑɔ̀]) to Daw Zalat (ဒေါ်ဇလပ်) and her husband U Pya (ဦးပြား) in a small Upper Burma village called Kanneint (ကမ်းနိမ့်) in Sagaing Division on 24 April 1889. He had an elder sister Phwa Thaik (ဖွားသိုက်) and a younger brother Tha Pon (သာပုံ). Like most Burmese boys of the era, Hla Kyaw received his education at the local Buddhist monastery, Inna Monastery (အင်းနား) run by Ven. U Sandima (စန္ဒိမာ, Pali: Candimā). At 12, he became a novice monk with the dhamma title of Wisara (ဝိစာရ, Vicāra). He left the order after four years, actively participated in local activities, and became recognized as a youth leader in the community. At 18, he was married off to a local girl, Me Nyan (မယ်ဉာဏ်), with whom he had a daughter named Phwa Yan (ဖွားရန်). But the arranged marriage broke down three months after their daughter was born. He remarried his childhood sweetheart Thay Hmyin (သေးမျှင်), who gave birth to a daughter named Nwe (နွယ်).

== Return to monkhood ==
Hla Kyaw is said to be unfulfilled with life. He took a sabbatical, and entered the monkhood for three months at the Tint-Taung Monastery at Salingyi, a nearby town. At the end of the sabbatical, he decided to be a monk full-time, and asked his parents and wife for permission. With their permission, he was ordained as a monk in 1912 at the Bonpyan Monastery by the Chief Abbot U Ãdeissa (အာဒိစ္စ, Ãdicca). He took his novice monkhood title of Wisara. He was 23.

In the next decade, the young monk studied grammar, Pali language, and Theravada Canon under the tutelage of different learned sayadaws in Upper Burma (Magyibok, Pyinmana, Chaung-U, Mandalay, and Pakokku). While studying, he taught classes in monastic schools at the Kan Oo monastery in Pyinmana, and at the Maha Withudarama monastery in Pakkoku. He then went to India where he studied Sanskrit and the Nāgarī script for two years.

== Political activities ==
In the 1920s, U Wisara gradually became active in the country's nascent independence movement. He had returned from India to Pakkoku where became an executive committee member in the local association of monks. In 1923, he met U Ottama who had already been once imprisoned by the British for making anti-colonial speeches. He too started traveling and making speeches, and ran into trouble with the law.

=== First prison stay ===
In 1926, he was sentenced to prison for a year and nine months for making an "illegal speech" in the Tharrawaddy District. At the prison, authorities ordered him to take off the Buddhist monk's robe and wear the inmate uniform. He refused. Because Indian prison guards would not disrobe him, British officers themselves forcibly disrobed him. The monk went on a hunger strike, refusing to take any food or drink until he was allowed to wear the robe. Prison officials repeatedly tortured him but he did not give in. Forty days into the hunger strike, prison officials finally relented and allowed him to wear the robe. They transferred him to a prison in Midnapore, West Bengal. He was released from prison on 29 February 1929.

=== Second prison stay ===
His independence was short-lived. He promptly rejoined the political scene, and was duly arrested again for making an anti-colonialist speech at a village near Thongwa (present-day Yangon Region). He was sentenced to six years in prison for inciting sedition. In a replay of the first prison stay, U Wisara was forcibly disrobed, and the monk again went on a hunger strike on 6 April 1929. This time, in a test of wills prison officials did not relent even as the news of the strike attracted increasing attention as the strike went on. Over four months into the strike, on 17 August 1929, a few senior monks were allowed to see him in the prison. U Wisara repeated his conditions that he would take milk if he was allowed to wear the robe, and food if he was allowed to fast on Sabbath days, and that he was prepared to die for the cause. The British authorities were unmoved however. The monk died 166 days into the strike on 19 September 1929 (2nd waning of Tawthalin 1291 ME) at 8:20 in the morning. The prison officials secretly dropped off the monk's body at 3 am the next day at a monastery in Kyimyindaing (west of downtown Yangon).

== Legacy ==
Though expected for some time, the news of his death still shocked the country. There was an outpouring of public support for what he stood for. He was given a martyr's cremation and burial in the public square west of the Shwedagon Pagoda (today, People's Square and Park). The previously unknown monk's "ultimate sacrifice profoundly moved many Burmese who not concerned themselves with politics before", and galvanized the nascent independence movement. He became a martyr of the independence movement.

The U Wisara Road, a major avenue in Yangon, and the U Wisara Monument in Yangon are named after him.

== Bibliography ==
- Fink, Christina (2001). Living Silence: Burma Under Military Rule (2, illustrated ed.). Zed Books. ISBN 9781856499262.
- Kyaw Aye, U (1993). The Voice of Young Burma. Cornell University SEAP Publications. ISBN 9780877271291.
- Myanma Swezon Kyan (in Burmese). Vol. 12 (1 ed.). Yangon: Burma Translation Society. 1972.
- Than Win Hlaing. ရုပ်ထုမှပြောသော မြန်မာ့သမိုင်းဝင် ပုဂ္ဂိုလ်ထူးများ (Notable People of Burmese History by Statues) (in Burmese).
- Seekins, Donald M. (2006). Historical dictionary of Burma (Myanmar), vol. 59 of Asian/Oceanian historical dictionaries. Vol. 59 (Illustrated ed.). Sacredcrow Press. ISBN 978-0-8108-5476-5.
