= Hsinbyushin Bridge =

Bridge in Myanmar

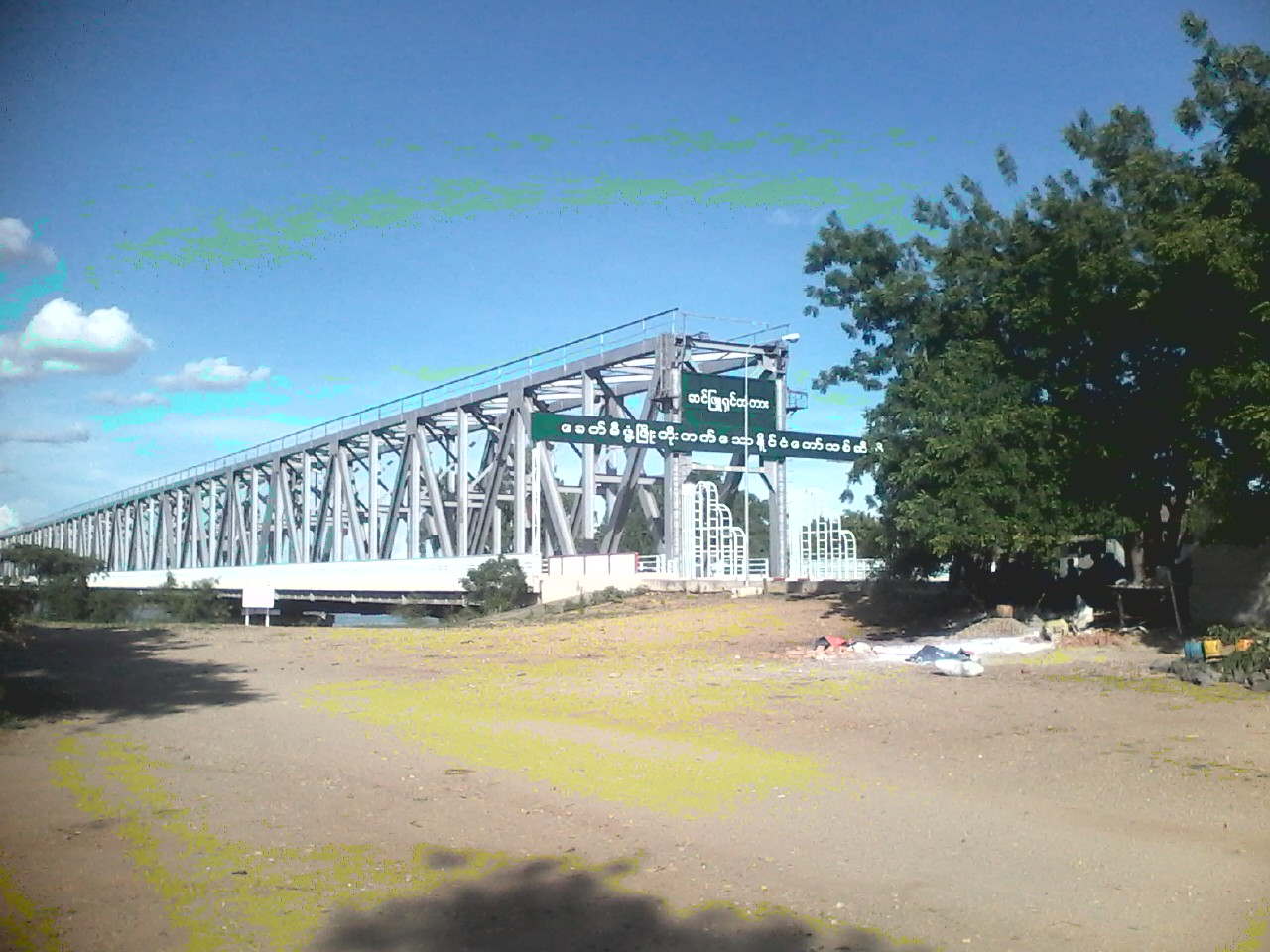
- Coordinates: 21°48′10.5″N 95°10′10.5″E
- Carries: Chaung-U-Pakokku highway; Sagaing - Magway railway
- Crosses: Chindwin River
- Locale: Magway Region and Sagaing Region, Myanmar
- Official name: Hsinbyushin Bridge

Characteristics
- Total length: 1,487 metres (4,879 ft)

Location
- Interactive map of Hsinbyushin Bridge

Hsinbyushin Bridge, also known as Sin Phyu Shin Bridge, is a 1,487 metres (4,879 ft) long bridge over the Chindwin river between the Sagaing Region and the Magway Region in Myanmar. It is located on the Chaung-U-Pakokku highway and carries the Sagaing - Magway Railway line on it.

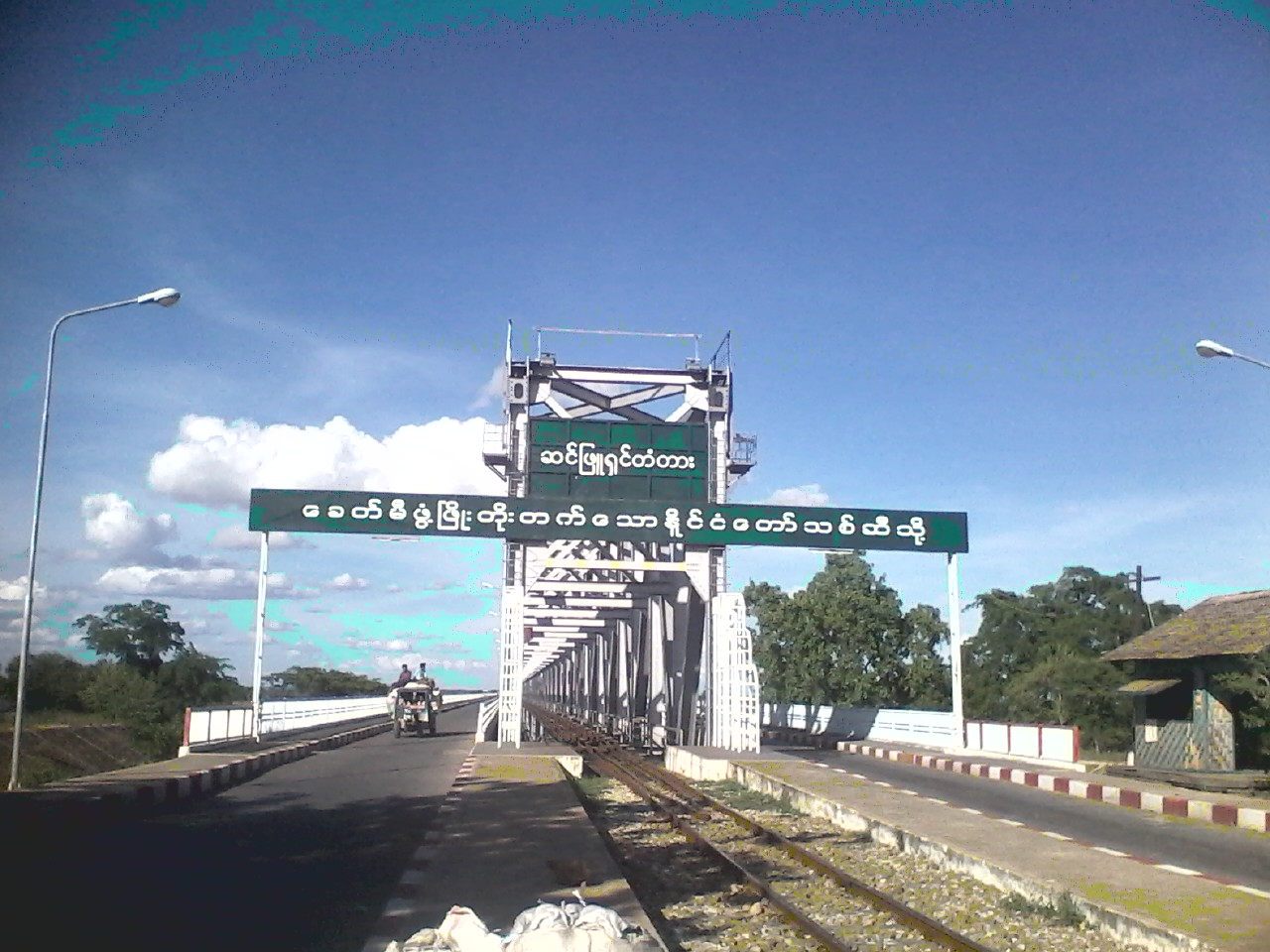
Hsinbyushin Bridge

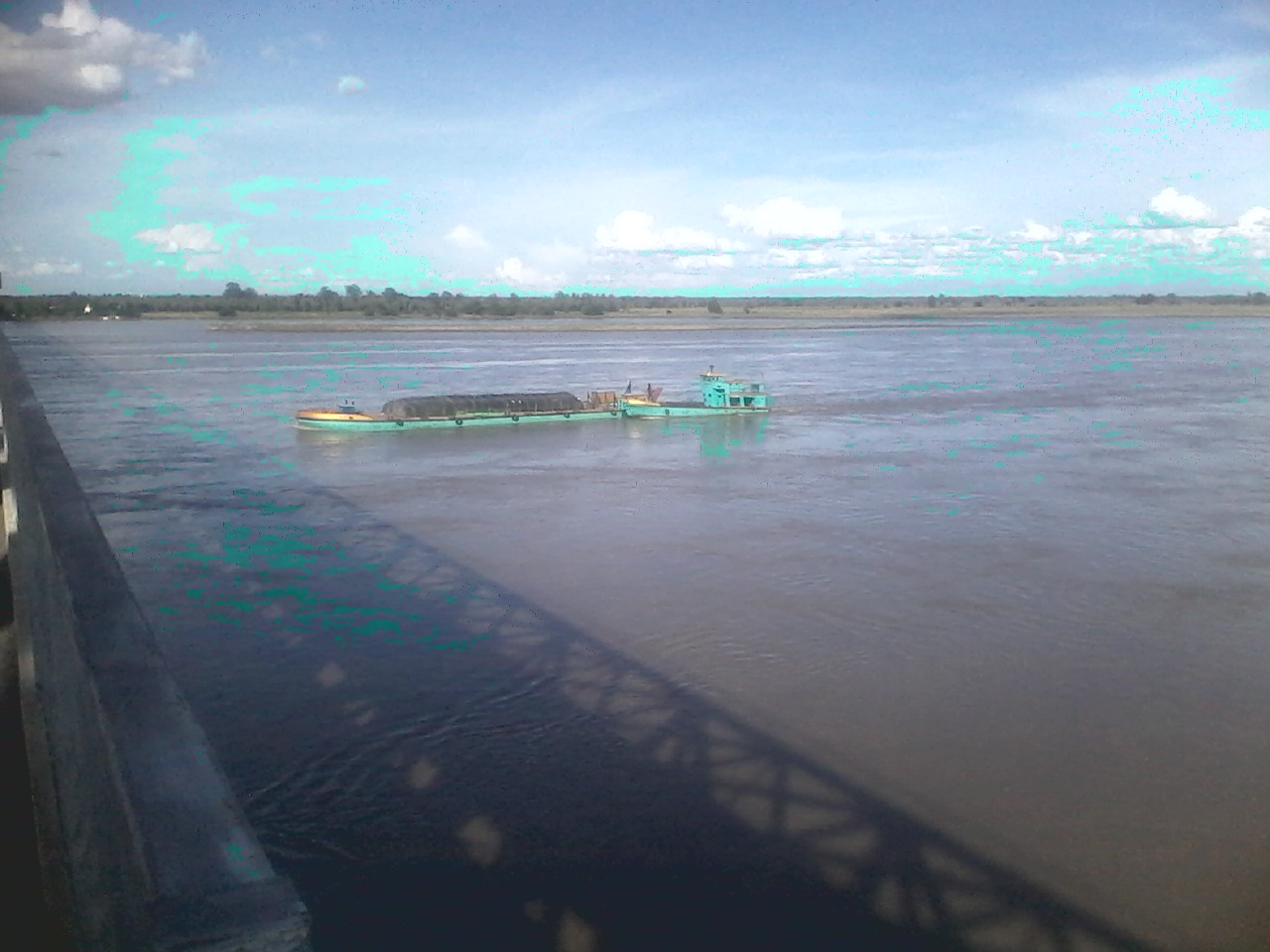
Hsinbyushin Bridge
