= Amyint =

Village in Sagaing Region, Burma

Coordinates: 21°55′42″N 95°08′59″E

Amyint is a village located in Monywa District, Sagaing Region in Upper Myanmar. It was one of the key districts during the days of the Burmese monarchy.

== History ==
During the Ava period, King Swa Saw Ke was the governor of the district before his accession to the Ava throne. Moreover, the city was one which was important for the armies of the kings at all almost dynasties. Lord Min Let-pha-wa of Amyint was a well-known vassal ruler in the Konbaung period. U Wisara, a national hero and martyr of the nation of Myanmar hailed from Kanneint, one of the villages in the Amyint region. The writer Nyo Mya was born in Thawtapan village from the region.

== Transport ==
The rural road of Chaung-U-Amyint leads to the city. Also, "the Monywa-A Myint Rural Road" can be used.

== Other names ==
Amyint also has classical names.

- Sanlavati (Thanlawaddy)
- Ujeni (Okzeni)
