= Allagappa =

- Town
- Location in the Sagaing area and in relation to the Irrawaddy River.
- Coordinates: 21°55′46″N 95°29′30″E
- Country: Burma
- Region: Sagaing Region
- District: Sagaing District
- Township: Myinmu Township
- Time zone: UTC+6.30 (MST)

Allagappa is a small town in Myinmu Township in the southeast of the Sagaing Division in Burma. It is located west of Myinmu, near the northern bank of the Irrawaddy River. It lies in the Allagappa Valley, about 30 miles west of Sagaing city. It is connected by road to the main Monywa to Sagaing road and has a divisional medical centre. Allagappa was occupied in late January 1944 by the 100th Infantry Brigade of the British Indian Army during World War II.
