= Technological University, Sagaing =

Higher education institute in Sagaing Region, Myanmar

Coordinates: 21°55′25.2″N 95°57′15.9″E

Sagaing Technological University
- စစ်ကိုင်းနည်းပညာတက္ကသိုလ်
- Type: Public
- Established: 1990; 36 years ago
- Affiliations: ISO 9001-2015
- Rector: Dr.Aung San Linn
- Location: Sagaing, Sagaing Region, Myanmar
- Nickname: STU
- Website: https://www.tusagaing.edu.mm/?page_id=1841&lang=en

Sagaing Technological University is located in Sagaing, Myanmar. It was initially established as Technical High School on 17 September 1990.

== History ==
The Institute of Technology (Syrian) was founded as an industrial high school on September 17, 1990. On 1 December 1998, it was upgraded as a Government Technical Institute, on 20 January 2007 as a Government Technological College and on 23 February 2012 to university level.

== Engineering Departments ==
- Civil Engineering Department
- Electrical Power Engineering Department
- Electronics and Communication Engineering Department
- Mechanical Engineering Department

== Supportive Academic Departments ==
- Burmese Department
- English Department
- Engineering Mathematics Department
- Engineering Physics Department
- Engineering Chemistry Department

== Program ==
The university offers Bachelor of Engineering.

- Bachelor of Engineering (Civil)
- Bachelor of Engineering (Mechanical)
- Bachelor of Engineering (Electrical Power)
- Bachelor of Engineering (Electronics)
