= Chaung-U =

Chaung-U ချောင်းဦး
- Town
- Location of Chaung-U, Burma
- Coordinates: 21°57′30″N 95°16′32″E
- Country: Myanmar
- Region: Sagaing Region
- District: Monywa District

Population (2010)
  - Ethnic groups: Bamar Burmese Indians
  - Religions: Buddhism Christianity Islam
- Time zone: UTC+6:30 (MST)

Chaung-U (Burmese: ချောင်းဦးမြို့) is a town located in Monywa District, Sagaing Region, Myanmar. It is the principal town of Chaung-U Township. During the Bagan Dynasty, under King Popa Sawrahan (also known as King Taungthugyi), it was known as "San Tauk Village" and was inhabited by diverse ethnic groups including Kayin, Shan and Lawah (Wah) peoples. Later, King Kyansit established the city by consolidating ten villages including Ywa Thit and Ywa Ma. He renamed it Chaung-U (also spelled Chaung Oo).

The area features several ancient pagodas, other historical villages, streams, and hills.

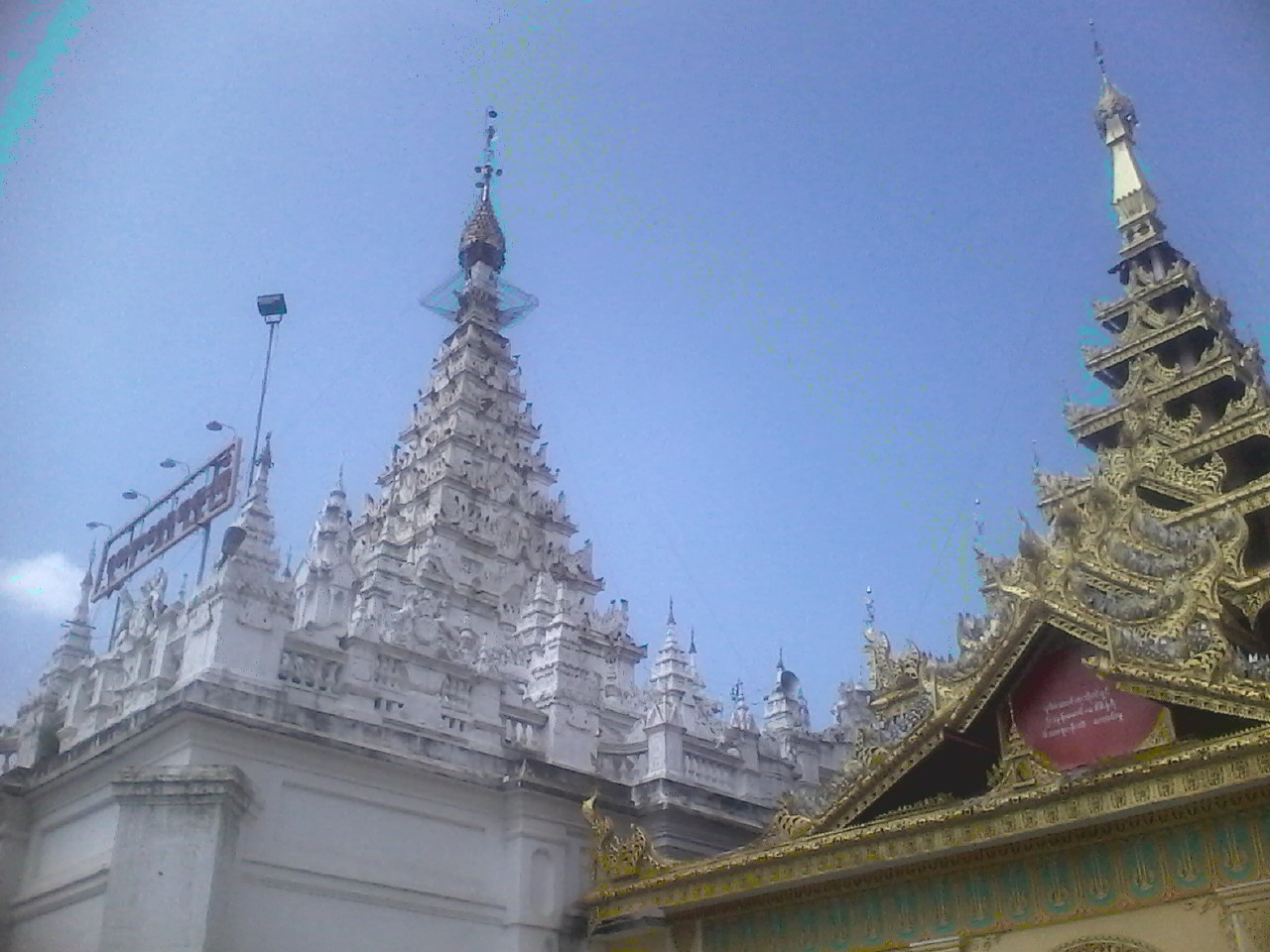
Yadana Shwe Gu Kyi Pagoda, which was built by King Alaung Sithu in Chaung-U

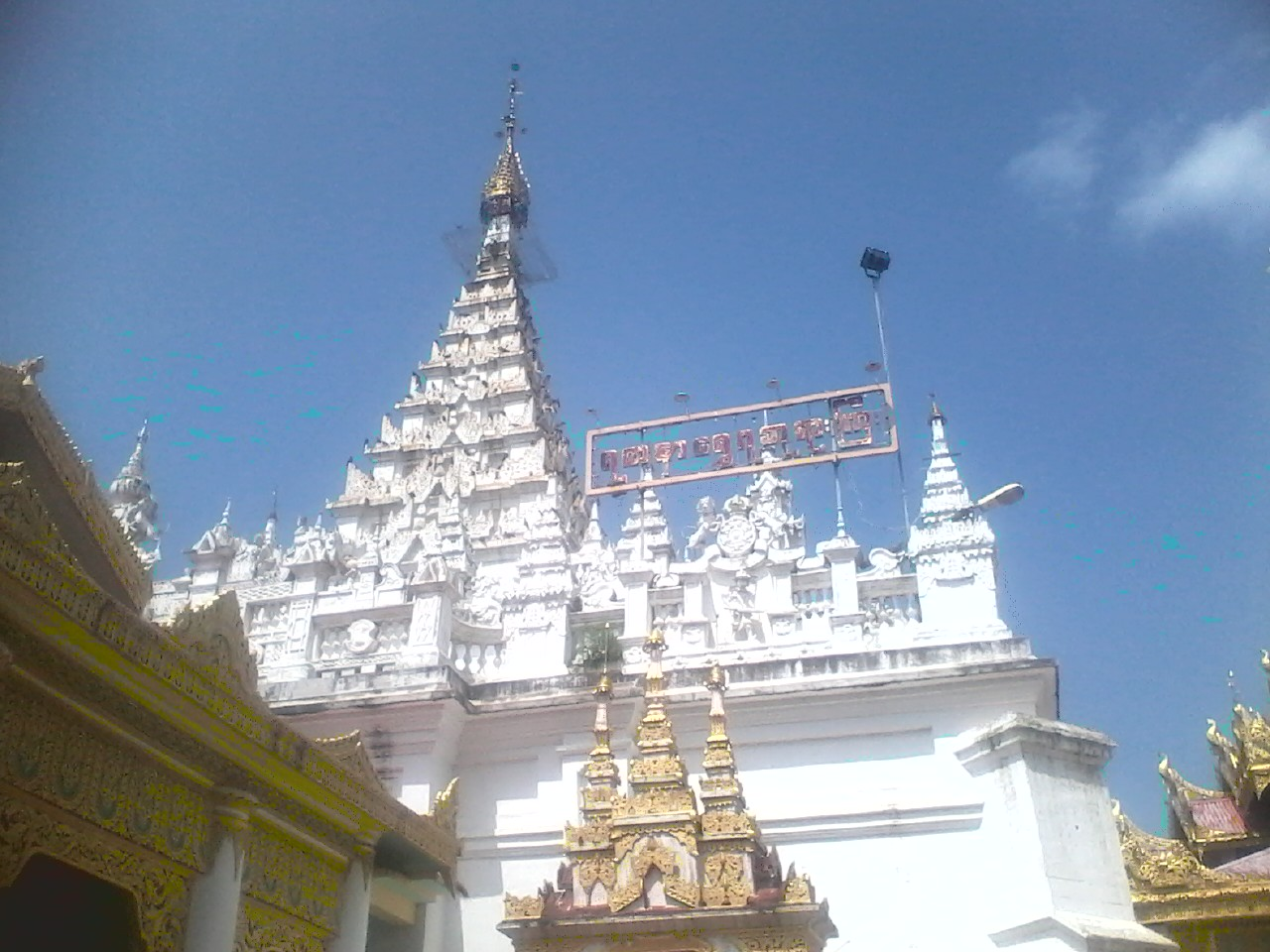
Shwe Gu Kyi Pagoda

== History ==
Chaung-U was a village in the early age of the Bagan Dynasties before King Anawrahta. The village was crowded, so King Taung Thu Kyi transferred there from Poppa when he was a farmer before he became a king. When he became the king in Bagan, he founded the village as an ideal village surrounded by ten villages, and he called it Than Tauk in ME 187 (825 CE). The village was named Than Tauk (San Tauk) because holes flared up when some holes were dug to traditionally bury the abracadabra copper sheets in the ground and to make the village fence. Then, King Kyansit founded the city with ten villages including San Tauk and named it Chaung-U. He called it so because some waves of the Nwe Chway stream were ahead of him there, although he tried to jump across it. When he was a prince, he had always been there and he stayed for a while. After that, the prince Kya Swar and his mother stayed and prayed in Saman Daja (Thaman Daza) Pagoda in Chaung-U to become a king. When he became the king, he offered to gild the pagoda. There is still an inscription on a flat stone for his gilding and offering to the pagoda and donating to the monastery.

Chaung-U is home to numerous historical pagodas and monasteries. It has over 200 pagodas and 60 monasteries. Among them, the most distinctive pagoda is Yadana Shwe Gukyi Pagoda built in the downtown in ME 288 (926 CE). It was built by King Ah'laung Sithu and that King Popa Saw Raham built it. Throughout all dynasties in Myanmar, Chaung-U has been a town but it was sometimes a village. When King Sin Phyu Shin governed in Innwa and the country, Ramma Siri Kyaw Htin, the Librarian of Pitakkat and headman of ten villages of Chaung-U, was a famous doctor of literature. Moreover, Min Latwah who served King Mindom was also a famous headman of ten villages of Chaung-U and mayor of A Myint. In the age of the British Colony, Venerable Abbot Ven. D Pa of Maha Dhmmayone Pali University was honored as the Agga Maha Pantita by the British Government of Myanmar. Later abbots were also granted that certificate of honour by the National Governments. In ME 1365 (2004 CE), the centenary ceremony of the university was celebrated. Many famous poets, politicians and intellectuals have been born in Chaung-U. Now, it is a crowded town located on important highways.

== Location and Transportation ==
Chaung-U is situated 231.46 feet (70.55 m) above sea level at 21°57′N 95°16′E. It is a regional transportation hub for both road and rail. The Monywa–Mandalay highway gives access to Mandalay (84 miles) and Monywa (14 miles) and there is also a good highway from Chaung-U to Pakokku.

The town's railway station connects the Monywa–Mandalay line with the Chaung-U–Pakokku branch. Its neighbouring townships are: Myinmu to the east, Myaung to the south, Salingyi to the west, and Monywa to the north.

The Chindwin River is six miles to the west.

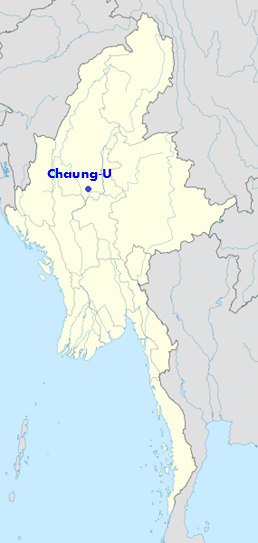
Location of Chaung-U in map Coordinates 21°57′30″N, 95°16′32″E Sagaing Division, Central Myanmar

== Economy ==
The township has much farmland and is located at the junction of two highways. Public business benefits from this location, and the area is rich in vegetables, fruits and other foods. One can easily get various vegetables at reasonable prices. Communication is convenient, which helps commerce, trade and transportation. As a result, a considerable portion of the population in the town enjoy a comfortable living standard.

== Weather and climate ==
It is in a central zone of Myanmar. Its weather is fair. Chaung-U features a tropical wet and dry climate.

== Geography ==
In the east of the town, there are long rocky hills, namely, "Nwechway Hills". The town is situated in a plain. In the west, there are many green basin farms near the Chindwin river. Those farms in the east are irrigated by Nwe Chway Dam near Nwe Chway village.

== Education ==
Technical High School (THS)/Institute of Technical and Vocational High Education

== Attractions ==
- Hsinbyushin Bridge
- Shwe Gu Gyi Pagoda
- Nwe Chway Dam
- Maha Dhmmayon Pali University and Ya-Pyei Temple

== Distinction ==
Chaung-U is a town that was not totally destroyed by the World Wars. It had one of the earliest National Institutes during the British colonial period. Thakin Kodaw Hmaing, a poet and politician, wrote about the town in "Ten Villages of Chaung-U". Venerable Bago Myoma Shweku, abbot Ven. Eindasara, Venerable Mandalay Myoma Masoyein, abbot Ven. Siri Nanda Vivamsa (Thiri Nanda Bhiwuntha), Venerable Monywa Thaton Vamsa (Thaton Wuntha), and abbot Ven. Pannavamsa (Pyinnyawuntha) learnt their Pari Yatti Buddhist literature in the Maha Dhmmayon Pali University in Chaung-U. Moreover, the abbot of Maha Bodhi Tahtaung, Ven U Narada, also learnt the Buddhist literature in Kyigon in Chaung-U township.

Another distinction of the town is having the oldest festival of the whole township, Maha Pawah Rāna, on Thadingyut Full Moon Day every year. In 2012, the 70th Maha Pawah Rāna Festival of the whole township was celebrated. In the festival, all Buddhist monks in the whole township meet each other and make the Pawah Rāna in the only Buddhist Pawah Rāna Hall of the township, and Buddhist people offer some articles to them on every Thadingyut Full Moon Day. The festival has been successfully celebrated yearly since 1942. As the 70th festival of Maha Pawah Rāna was recently celebrated last Thadingyut Full Moon Day in 2012, Chaung-U is one of the towns and cities having the longest Maha Pawah Rāna festival tradition.

== Notable people ==
- Pitika Librarian Ramma Siri Kyaw Htin who served at the court of King Hsinbyushin
- Min Letwa, the Mayor of Amyint and headman of ten villages of Chaung-U, who served King Mindom
- Venerable Abbot Ven. D Pa of Maha Dhmmayon Pali University
- U Wisara (Ven. Vicara), a national hero and martyr of the nation of Myanmar, who was also one of the prominent activists against British rule in Burma and born in Kannyeint village in Chaung-U Township
- Nyo Mya who wrote the article Hell Hound at Large in Oway magazine (born in Thawtapan village in the township) (See also A Myint Village)
- Maung Gyi, Ledi Pantita, born in Nyaung Phyu Pin village (before, Chaung-U Township; now Monywa Township)

== See also ==
- Transport in Myanmar
