= Ngaizun =

- Location in the Sagaing area and in relation to the Irrawaddy River. Ngaizun (Myanmar)
- Coordinates: 21°53′52″N 95°41′14″E
- Country: Burma
- Region: Sagaing Region
- District: Sagaing District
- Time zone: UTC+6.30 (MST)

Ngaizun is a river town in the southeast of the Sagaing Division in Burma. Ngaziun lies on the southern bank of the Irrawaddy River several kilometres east downstream on the opposite side of the river from Myinmu. It contains at least 6 notable pagodas.
