= Sagaing Township =

- Township
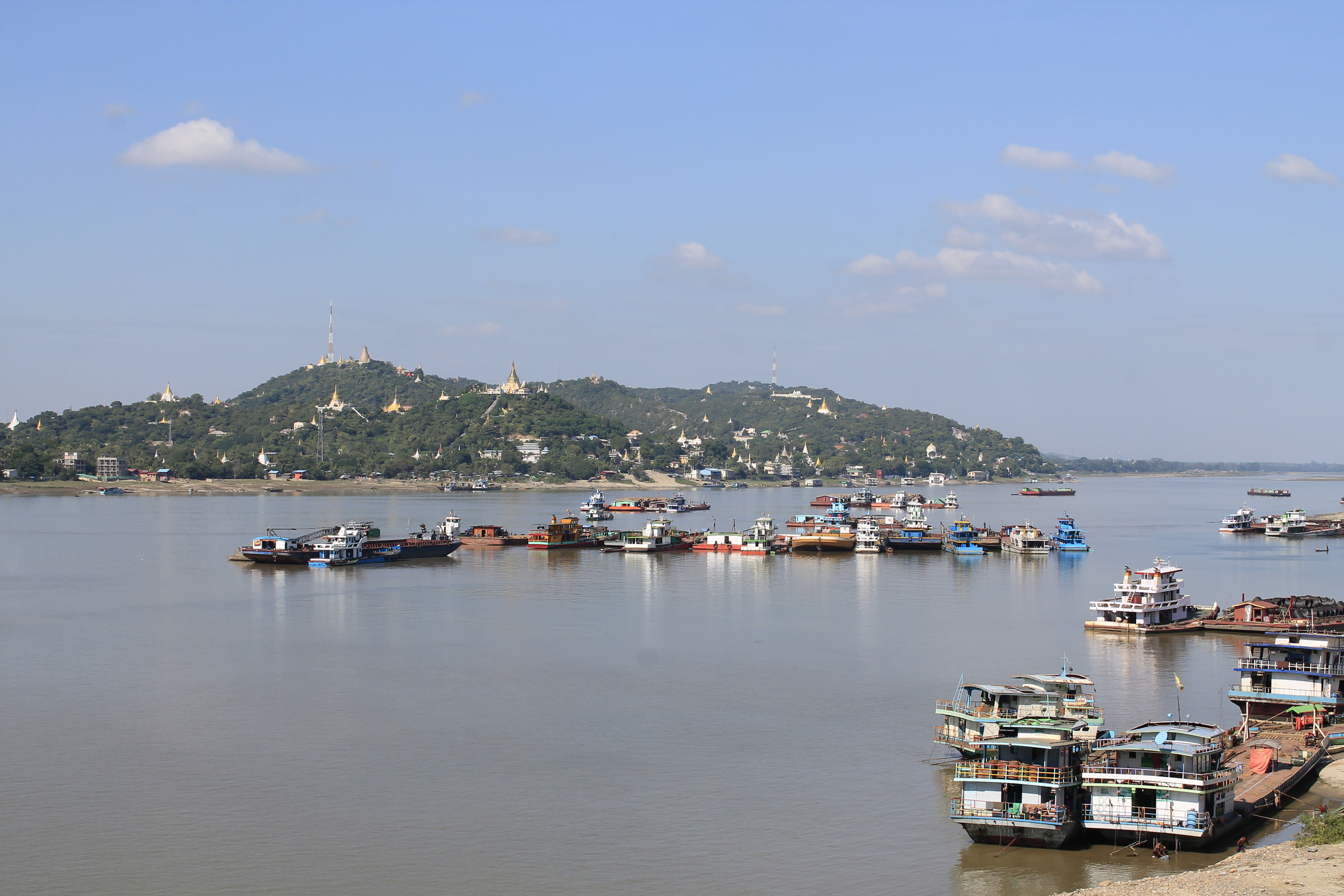
- View of Sagaing Township (including Sagaing Hill) from the Yadanabon Bridge

- Location in Sagaing Region
- Coordinates: 21°52′N 95°58′E
- Country: Myanmar
- Region: Sagaing Region
- District: Sagaing District
- Capital: Sagaing

Area
  - Total: 485.16 sq mi (1,256.6 km^{2})
- Elevation: 300 ft (91 m)
- Highest elevation: 1,372 ft (418 m)

Population (2023)
  - Total: 295,195
  - Density: 608.45/sq mi (234.92/km^{2})
  - Ethnicities: Bamar
  - Religions: Buddhism; Islam
- Time zone: UTC+6.30 (MMT)

Sagaing Township is a township in Sagaing District in the Sagaing Division of Myanmar. The township contains town towns- the principal town is Sagaing and Sataung comprising a total of 34 wards. The township additionally has 76 village tracts grouping together 177 villages including the tourist spot of Mingun.

Ye Kharr lake between Sagaing Hill and Min Wun Hill produces natural spirulina as in Twintaung of Budalin Township and Twinma and Taung Pauk of Kani Township. Mt. Shwe Myin Tin is the highest point in the township at 1,372 ft above sea level.

== Demographics ==
Historical Population
Year	Pop.	±%
1973		—
1983		—
2014	307,194	—
2018	283,332	−7.8%
2019	285,050	+0.6%
2022	293,481	+3.0%
2023	295,195	+0.6%
Source: Census and GAD data.

The 2014 Myanmar Census reported that Sagaing Township had a population of 307,194, with 26.5% of the population living in the urban wards of Sagaing. The population density was 244.5 people per km^{2}. The census reported that the median age was 30.1 years, and 88 males per 100 females. There were 65,143 households; the mean household size was 4.3. In 2019, the township's population dropped to 285,050 people. In 2023, the township increased to 295,195 people.

== See also ==
- Sadaung
