= Myinmu =

Myinmu မြင်းမူ
- Town
- Location in the Sagaing area and in relation to the Irrawaddy River.
- Coordinates: 21°56′N 95°35′E
- Country: Myanmar
- Region: Sagaing Region
- District: Sagaing District
- Township: Myinmu Township
- Time zone: UTC+6.30 (MST)

Myinmu (Burmese: မြင်းမူ) is a river town in the south-east of the Sagaing Region in Burma. The town has a rich history linked to World War II during the Burma Campaign against the Japanese, in 1944. It was also under the control of the Portuguese Missionaries in the 19th century. One of the first agricultural cooperatives was established here in 1905.

== Geography ==
Myinmu is the principal town of Myinmu Township and the town lies on the northern bank of the Irrawaddy River. Mu River flows about 7.5 kilometres (4.7 mi) away from the town. The population within 7 kilometres (4.3 mi) radius of the town is reported to be 19,452. It is located roughly 35 kilometres (22 mi) west of Mandalay. The nearest settlements are Paledan to the east and Tizaung, about 2 miles (3.2 km) to the north-east. Other settlements of note in the vicinity are Allagappa to the west and Ngaizun, located several miles away on the opposite side of the river.

The nearest International Airport is Mandalay International Airport (MDL), which is 69.7 kilometres (43.3 mi) away from the town.

== Climate ==
Myinmu has a hot semi-arid climate that borders on a tropical savanna climate (BSh bordering on Aw according to the Köppen climate classification) with a wet season and a dry season and with the temperature being warm year-round. The highest temperature ever recorded in Myanmar was recorded at Myinmu when a temperature of 47.2 °C (117.0 °F) was recorded on 14 May 2010. The wet season runs from May to October and the rest of the year is the dry season. The hottest temperatures happen during April and May as the wet season starts.

Climate data for Myinmu (1983–2010)
Month	Jan	Feb	Mar	Apr	May	Jun	Jul	Aug	Sep	Oct	Nov	Dec	Year
Mean daily maximum °C (°F)	30.1 (86.2)	33.2 (91.8)	37.3 (99.1)	40.0 (104.0)	38.2 (100.8)	36.2 (97.2)	35.7 (96.3)	34.9 (94.8)	34.3 (93.7)	33.4 (92.1)	31.4 (88.5)	29.5 (85.1)	34.5 (94.1)
Mean daily minimum °C (°F)	13.0 (55.4)	15.3 (59.5)	19.6 (67.3)	24.5 (76.1)	26.4 (79.5)	26.6 (79.9)	26.5 (79.7)	26.1 (79.0)	25.6 (78.1)	24.4 (75.9)	19.7 (67.5)	15.1 (59.2)	21.9 (71.4)
Average rainfall mm (inches)	0.9 (0.04)	4.3 (0.17)	4.4 (0.17)	22.9 (0.90)	111.8 (4.40)	90.1 (3.55)	67.7 (2.67)	116.2 (4.57)	160.6 (6.32)	116.9 (4.60)	25.7 (1.01)	3.0 (0.12)	724.5 (28.52)
Source: Norwegian Meteorological Institute

== History ==
Myinmu was occupied by Portuguese missionaries in the late 19th century who established Roman Catholic Mission in Myinmu and opened stations at Nabet and Chaung-U.

One of the earliest cooperatives in Burma was established in Myinmu township in March 1905 with 19 members. Myinmu was occupied by the British Indian Army during the Burma Campaign against the Japanese in 1944. Douglas Gracey occupied Myinmu on February 13, 1944 and crossed the Irrawaddy.

== Economy ==
Mynimu and the surrounding township rely on agriculture for their livelihoods and are located relatively close to the market in Mandalay. The principal crop is rice and farmers in the township have been reported to have devised new ways to reduce weed problems by replacing alternate wet-seeded rice with transplanted rice.

In the close precincts of the Myinmu Township, a small irrigation scheme, known as the Letpan Dam project, has been implemented in the year 2004, on the Letpan Creek to the north of Tawchaung Oo Village. It is an earthen dam, which is 4,000 feet (1,200 m) long and 90 feet (27 m) in height that created a storage of 4,910 acre-feet (6,060,000 m^{3}) to irrigate 25,000 acres (100 km^{2}) of land under double cropping with mixed crops. This has helped in improving the economic conditions of the farmers in the area. This is the 15th irrigation project implemented in the Sagaing district.

Another economic activity supported by the Japan International Cooperation Agency (JICA) is of rearing pigs and growing mushrooms. This pilot project was undertaken jointly by the Ministry of Livestock and Fisheries, the Ministry of Cooperatives and the Ministry of Agriculture and Irrigation, as a poverty alleviation programme in the dry zone under a development study on sustainable agriculture and rural development. The pilot project spread over 3 years involved six townships in three divisions including the Myinmu and Ayadaw townships in Sagaing Division. It is reported that the pig rearing programme was a supplement to growing food crops such as paddy during the cropping season, which improved the economic condition of the farmers. Under this pilot study, 2 pigs and four goats were given to the farmers of the villages on the basis that the farmers would repay the cost of the livestock after one year. Farmers who were interviewed were confident of the success of this scheme to supplement their income.

One more pilot project taken up under the same assistance programme, implemented by the Ministry of Agriculture related to planting of mushrooms at low cost. It was surmised that an investment of K 2500 could double in a short span of two weeks.
