= Myinmu Township =

- Township
- Location in Sagaing district

- Location in Sagaing Region

- Location in Burma
- Coordinates: 21°56′N 95°35′E
- Country: Burma
- Region: Sagaing Region
- District: Sagaing District
- Capital: Myinmu
- Time zone: UTC+6.30 (MST)

Myinmu Township is a township in the southeast of the Sagaing Division in Burma (Myanmar), west of Mandalay. The principal town is Myinmu which lies on the northern bank of the Irrawaddy River. History of Myinmu is closely linked to the World War II against the Japanese Army when British General Sir Douglas Gracey occupied the town after crossing the Irrawaddy River.

The nearest settlement to the town of Myinmu is Paledan, a river village to the east. Other settlements of note in the township are Allagappa to the west, Tizaung to the northeast and Ngaizun several miles away on the opposite side of the river from the main town. Apart from the Irrawaddy River, the Mu River also flows about 7.5 kilometres (4.7 mi) away from the town. The nearest airport to the town is the Mandalay International Airport (MDL), which is 69.7 kilometres (43.3 mi) away.

== Geography ==
Myinmu Township has an area of about 330 square miles (850 km^{2}). It has about 35 village tracts.

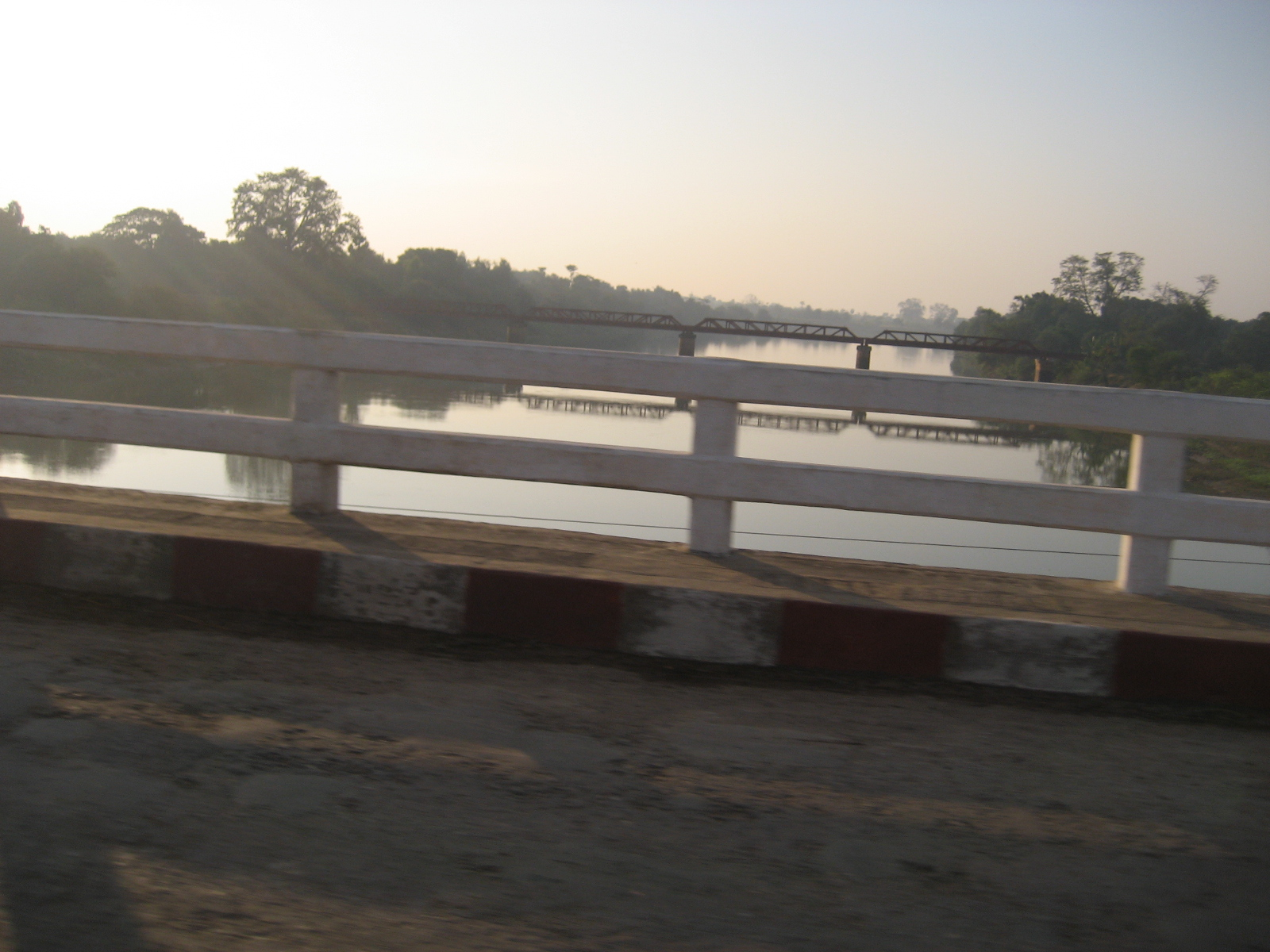
Road bridge on Mu River on the right bank of Myinmu

Mu River in the north-central Myanmar, runs on the right bank of Myinmu Township and joins the Irrawaddy River on the south, near this town; the river has a length of 175 km The river is navigable for boats up to Shebo District. The Kabo Weir across this river is used to cross for approaching the Shwebo Irrigation Project which was built to meet the irrigation needs of this Dry Zone. The Kabo Weir however, was constructed by the British colonial administration between 1901–1907.

== History ==
Myingu township was occupied by Portuguese missionaries in the late 19th century who established Roman Catholic mission stations at Nabet and Chaungu.

One of the earliest cooperatives in Burma was established in Myinmu Township in March 1905 with 19 members. Patterned on the Schulze–Delitzsch Cooperative Credit Society established in 1850, that lead to 16 similar societies getting set up in other parts of Burma. However, these credit societies had to closed own under stiff competition from the 55 societies of the Reiffeisen type, which were concerned mostly with agricultural credits to meet farmers’ needs. Myinmu was occupied by the British Indian Army during the Burma Campaign against the Japanese in 1944. Douglas Gracey occupied Myinmu on February 13, 1944 and crossed the Irrawaddy.

== Economy ==
Myinmu and the surrounding township rely on agriculture for their livelihoods and are located relatively close to the market in Mandalay. The principal crop is rice and farmers in the township have been reported to have devised new ways to reduce weed problems by replacing alternate wet-seeded rice with transplanted rice. In the past, the popular variety of Rice was not grown in Myinmu. Jowar (locally in Burmese language “pyaung”), called the great millet was grown in the dry zones of Singiang District, which was the staple food of people in Myinmu and Myotha towns. There are two varieties of Jowar namely, the Sanpyaung, the whitish green variety and the Kunpayung. The whitish green variety has large stalks. The edible part of this variety is also used as substitute to rice.

The agricultural economy of the township got a boost with assistance provided by the Japan International Cooperation Agency (JICA) to rear pigs and grow mushrooms under a cooperative pilot project launched by the Ministry of Livestock and Fisheries, the Ministry of Cooperatives and the Ministry of Agriculture and Irrigation, as a poverty alleviation programme in the dry zone under a development study on sustainable agriculture and rural development.

Further, an irrigation project was built to provide irrigation facilities to 25,000 acres (10,000 ha) of land, which enabled double cropping on the lands with mixed crops. The earth dam (90 feet (27 m) in height and 4,000 feet (1,200 m) long) built for the purpose is called the Letpan Dam, which created a storage of 4,910 acre-feet (6,060,000 m^{3}) to provide for irrigation.
