= Sagaing =

Town in Sagaing Region, Myanmar

Sagaing စစ်ကိုင်းမြို့ Zeyapura
- City
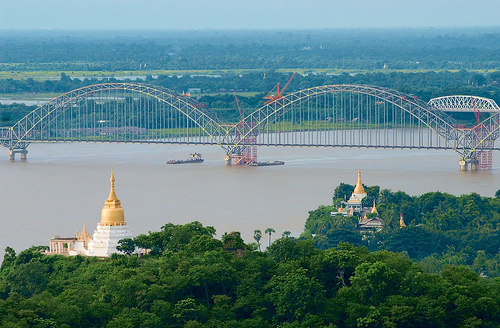
- The Yadanabon Bridge on the Irrawaddy

- Location in Myanmar
- Coordinates: 21°52′48″N 95°58′54″E
- Country: Myanmar
- Region: Sagaing Region
- Region: Sagaing District
- Region: Sagaing Township

Population (2023)
  - Total: 83,949
  - Religions: Buddhism; Islam
- Time zone: UTC+6.30 (MMT)

Sagaing (Burmese: စစ်ကိုင်းမြို့, MLCTS: cac kuing: mrui., pronounced [zəɡáɪɰ̃ mjo̰]), classical name: Jeyyapura (Victorious city) or Atulavatī (Unmatched realm), is a major city in Sagaing Region of Myanmar. It is located on the Irrawaddy River, 20 km (12 mi) to the south-west of Mandalay on the opposite bank of the river. Sagaing, with its numerous Buddhist monasteries, is an important religious and monastic centre. The pagodas and monasteries crowd the numerous hills along the ridge running parallel to the river. The central pagoda, Soon U Ponya Shin Pagoda, is connected by a set of covered staircases that run up the 240 m (790 ft) hill.

Today, with about 70,000 inhabitants, the city is part of Mandalay metropolitan area, home to more than 1,022,000 inhabitants as of 2011. It is a frequent tourist destination for day trippers, usually as part of the "three former capitals" itinerary alongside Amarapura and Innwa.

The city is home to five institutions of higher learning: the Sagaing Institute of Education, Sagaing Education College, Sagaing Technological University, Sagaing University of Co-operative and Management, and Sagaing University. The latter was established on 11 February 2012; it is located in Pakatoe Quarter, Sagaing Township, with an area of 121.55 ha (300.35 acres).

== Name ==
The classical name of Sagaing is Zeyapura (ဇေယျာပူရ; Pali: Jayapura), which literally translates to "city of victory."

== History ==
Sagaing was the capital of Sagaing Kingdom (1315–1364), one of the minor kingdoms that rose up after the fall of Pagan dynasty, where one of Thihathu's sons, Athinkhaya, established himself. During the Ava period (1364–1555), the city was the common fief of the crown prince or senior princes. During the reign of King Naungdawgyi, Sagaing briefly became the royal capital between 1760 and 1763.

On 8 August 1988, Sagaing was the site of mass public protests in support of the 8888 Uprising, which were brutally crushed by a massacre in which around 300 civilians were killed by local police forces.

Despite its name, the town is not the capital of Sagaing Region. However, groups including the civil society group "Steering Committee for the Return of All Regional Offices to Sagaing City in Accordance with the Constitution" object to this saying that the use of Monywa as the regional capital is unconstitutional per the 2008 Constitution of Myanmar.

As the epicentre of the 7.7-magnitude 2025 Sagaing earthquake, the city suffered loss of life as well as extensive damage to its buildings and infrastructure alongside neighbouring Mandalay. The Ava Bridge, one of two road-rail bridges connecting Sagaing to Mandalay, has partially collapsed. The city's fire station also collapsed, hampering relief efforts and trapping many. More than 100 bodies were recovered from the rubble of destroyed buildings and 90 percent of structures were destroyed. An estimated over 150 Muslim worshippers in the city died across three collapsed mosques. Out of the five mosques in Sagaing, four collapsed due to the earthquake. The Min Street Mosque is feared to have collapsed with over 100 people inside. Several monastic schools and a nunnery in the city were also damaged, likely killing people in the hundreds and trapping over 900 monks across four monasteries.

== Demographics ==
In 2014, the city had 81,432 people within its city limits. The broader Sagaing Township had 307,194 people. In 2019, the city's population dropped to 79,944 people before returning to 83,939 people in 2023. However, the broader Sagaing township area had fallen in population to 295,195 people.

== Climate ==
Located in the rain shadow of the Arakan Mountains, Sagaing has a borderline hot semi-arid climate (Köppen BSh) just short of a tropical savanna climate (Aw). The city receives less than a third of the rainfall that Chittagong has at a similar latitude on the Bay of Bengal. Unlike most monsoonal semi-arid climates, the rainy season is relatively long at around five to six months, while variability and extreme monthly and daily rainfalls are much lower than usual with this type of climate.

Climate data for Sagaing (1991–2020)
Month	Jan	Feb	Mar	Apr	May	Jun	Jul	Aug	Sep	Oct	Nov	Dec	Year
Record high °C (°F)	34.6 (94.3)	37.7 (99.9)	42.0 (107.6)	45.5 (113.9)	45.2 (113.4)	40.5 (104.9)	40.0 (104.0)	38.4 (101.1)	38.8 (101.8)	38.0 (100.4)	37.0 (98.6)	36.5 (97.7)	45.5 (113.9)
Mean daily maximum °C (°F)	29.5 (85.1)	32.6 (90.7)	36.4 (97.5)	38.3 (100.9)	36.0 (96.8)	34.4 (93.9)	33.7 (92.7)	33.0 (91.4)	33.2 (91.8)	32.8 (91.0)	31.4 (88.5)	29.2 (84.6)	33.4 (92.1)
Daily mean °C (°F)	22.0 (71.6)	24.5 (76.1)	28.6 (83.5)	31.4 (88.5)	30.9 (87.6)	30.3 (86.5)	29.9 (85.8)	29.5 (85.1)	29.4 (84.9)	28.5 (83.3)	25.9 (78.6)	22.6 (72.7)	27.8 (82.0)
Mean daily minimum °C (°F)	14.5 (58.1)	16.5 (61.7)	20.8 (69.4)	24.6 (76.3)	25.8 (78.4)	26.2 (79.2)	26.2 (79.2)	25.9 (78.6)	25.5 (77.9)	24.2 (75.6)	20.4 (68.7)	16.0 (60.8)	22.2 (72.0)
Record low °C (°F)	10.7 (51.3)	11.0 (51.8)	13.5 (56.3)	18.7 (65.7)	19.3 (66.7)	20.5 (68.9)	20.0 (68.0)	20.5 (68.9)	19.2 (66.6)	16.7 (62.1)	14.0 (57.2)	12.3 (54.1)	10.7 (51.3)
Average precipitation mm (inches)	5.0 (0.20)	3.5 (0.14)	5.4 (0.21)	40.6 (1.60)	148.6 (5.85)	82.1 (3.23)	66.2 (2.61)	126.2 (4.97)	158.9 (6.26)	134.3 (5.29)	28.4 (1.12)	4.8 (0.19)	804.0 (31.65)
Average precipitation days (≥ 1.0 mm)	0.6	0.4	0.6	3.2	9.5	6.8	5.9	9.3	11.0	8.5	2.6	0.7	59.0
Source 1: World Meteorological Organization
Source 2: Meteomanz(record since 2014)

== People ==
- Sithu Kyawhtin, King of Ava (1552–1555)
- Zhu Youlang, Prince of Gui, last Ming Dynasty claimant to China, lived in exile at Sagaing in 1661
- Maurice Collis, author of Trials in Burma, district commissioner of the Sagaing district in 1928
- Tom Mitford, brother of the Mitford Sisters, was killed while serving with the Devonshire Regiment at Sagaing in 1945.
- Zaw Hlaing Thein, politician

== Places of interest ==
The Kaunghmudaw Pagoda (Burmese: ကောင်းမှုတော် ဘုရား [káʊɴ m̥ṵ dɔ̀ pʰəjá]; Yaza Mani Sula Kaunghmudaw (ရာဇမဏိစူဠာ ကောင်းမှုတော်); Pali: Rājamaṇicūḷā) is a large pagoda on the northwestern outskirts of Sagaing.

== Images ==
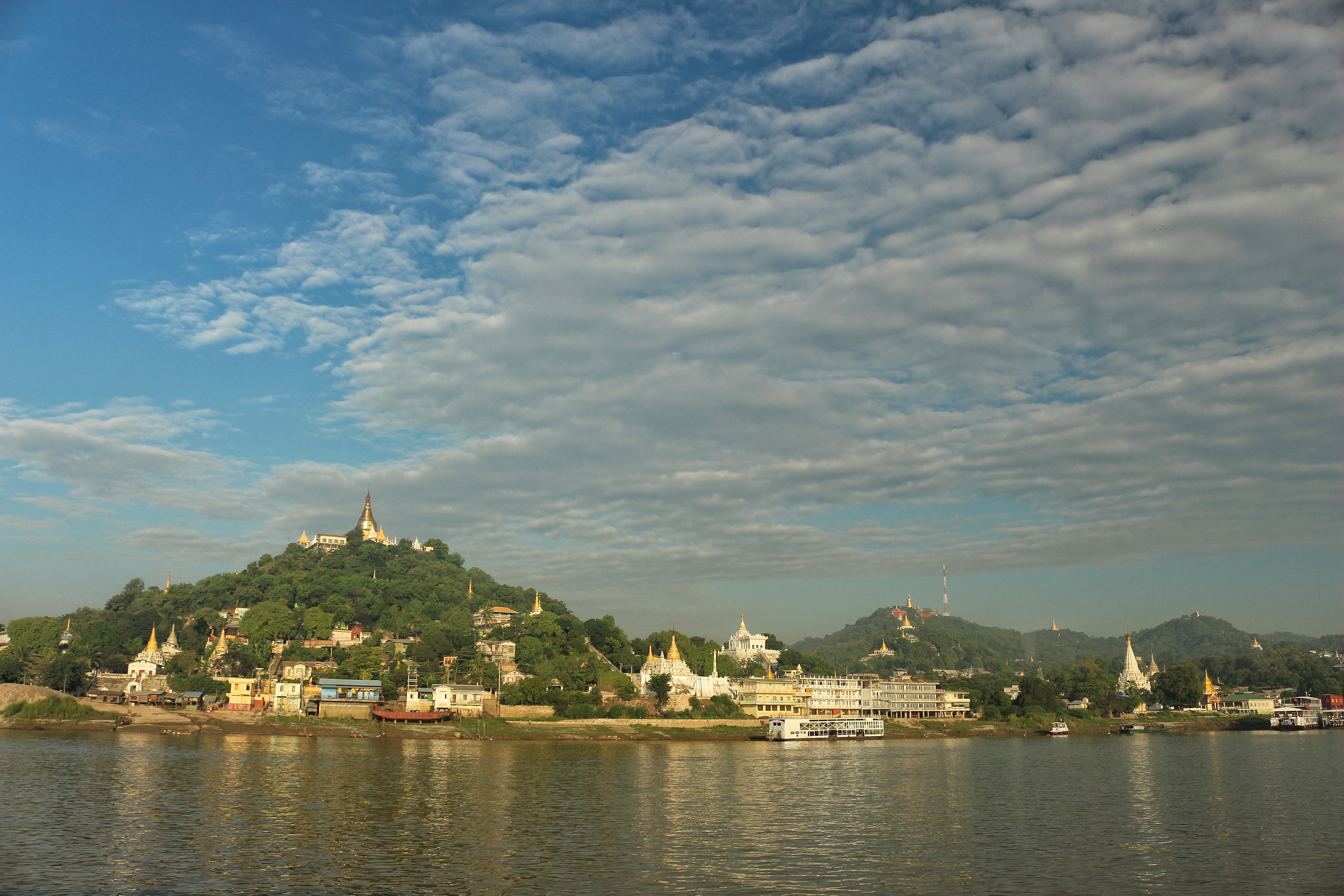
Sagaing Hill

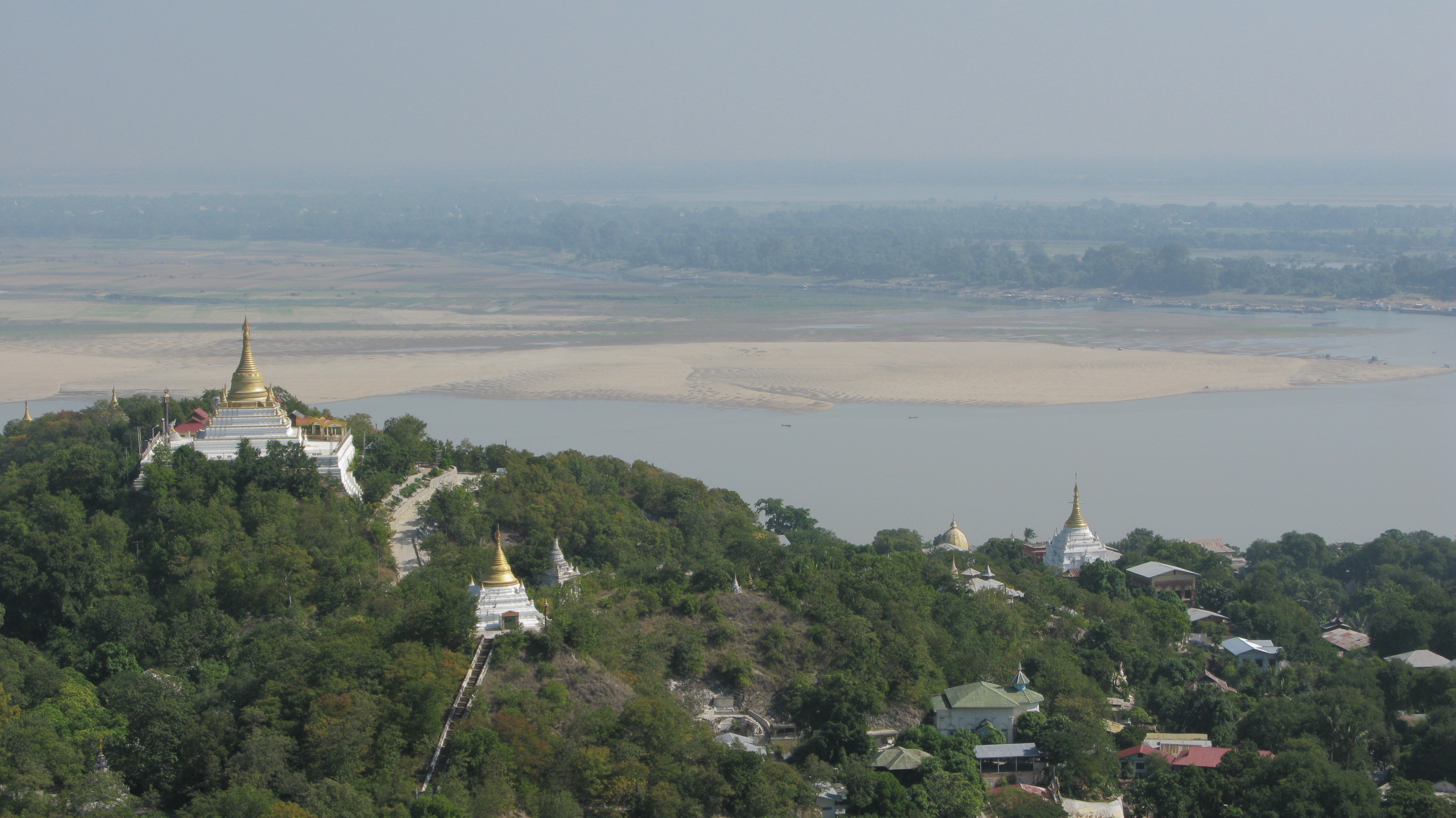
Irrawaddy River from Sagaing Hill, Sagaing

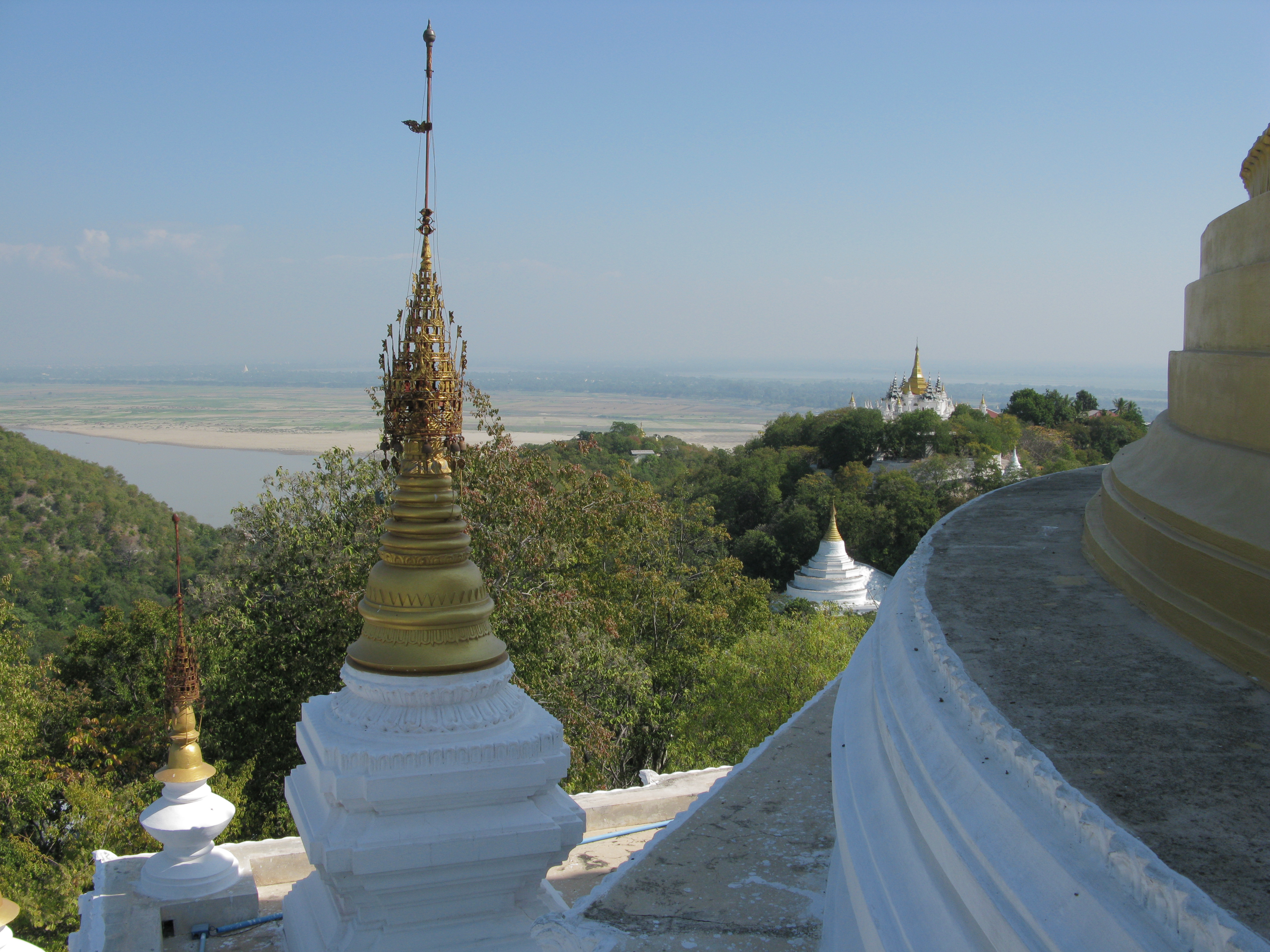
Pagodas

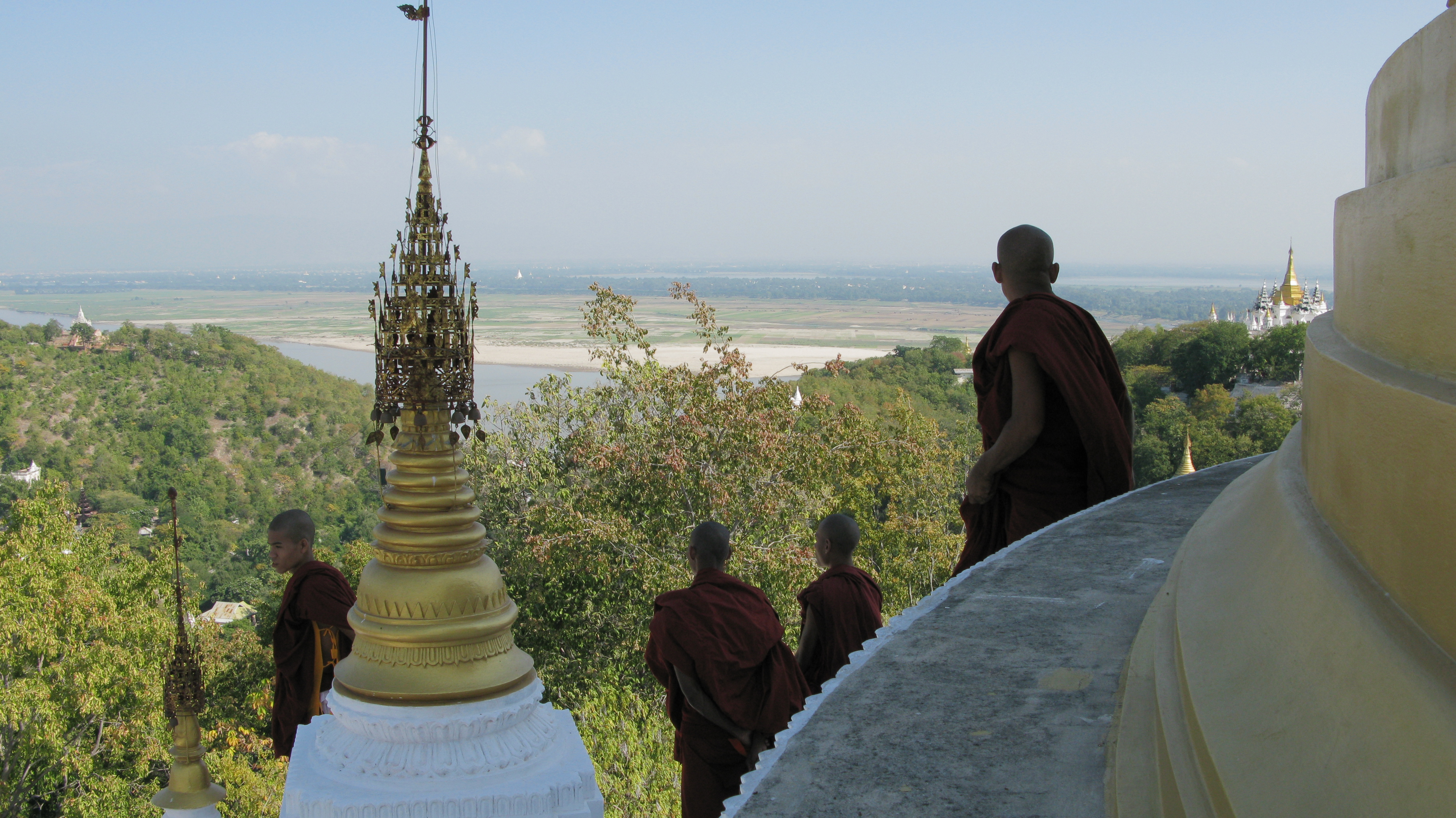
Buddhist monks

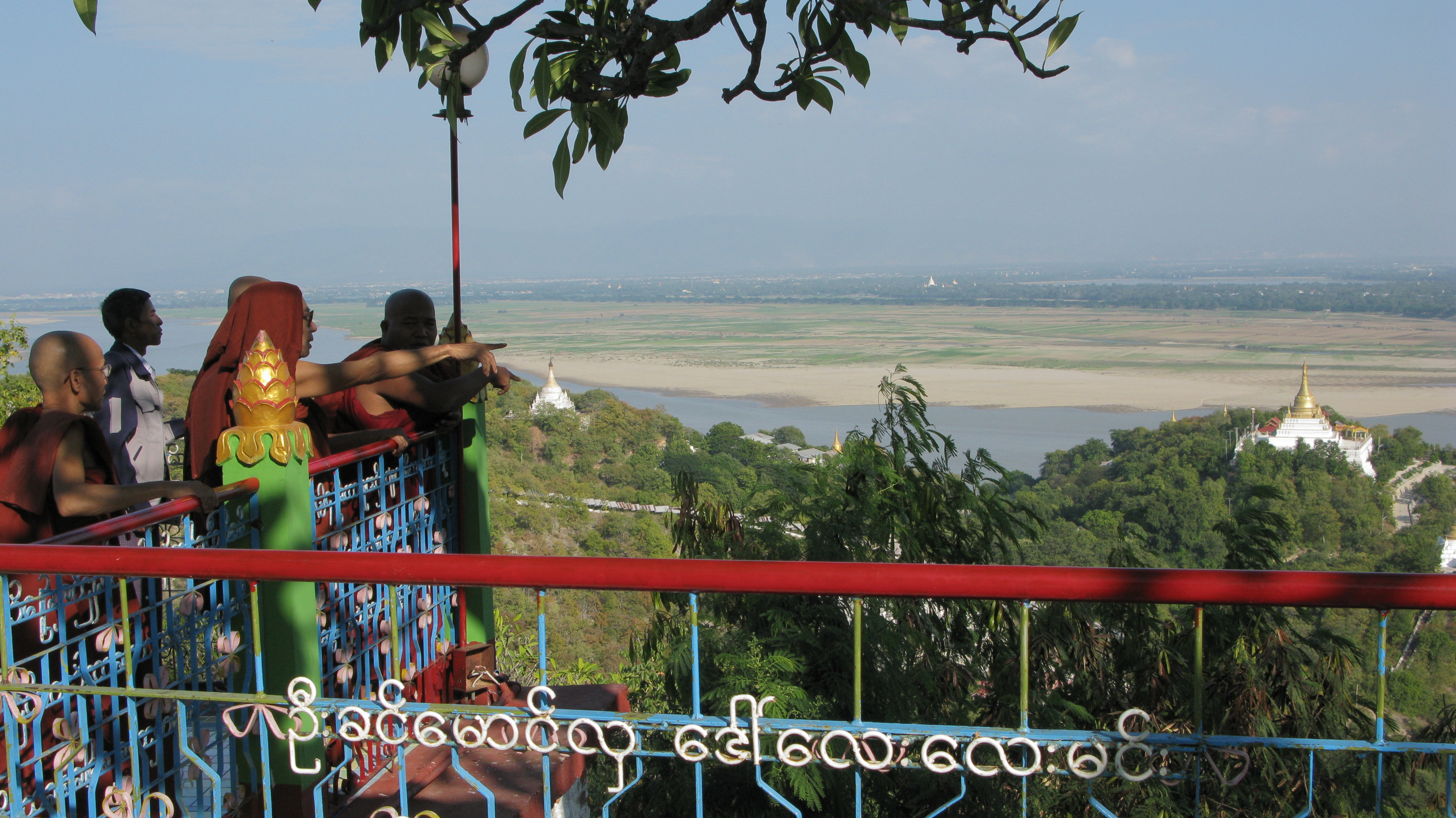
Viewpoint at Sagaing Hill

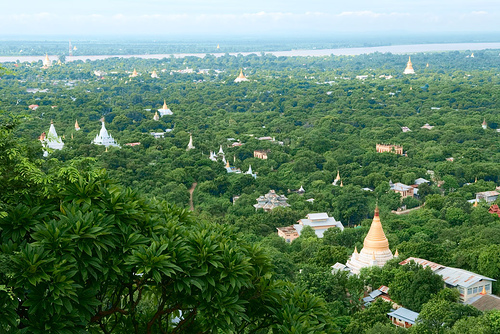
Pagodas dotting Sagaing's landscape

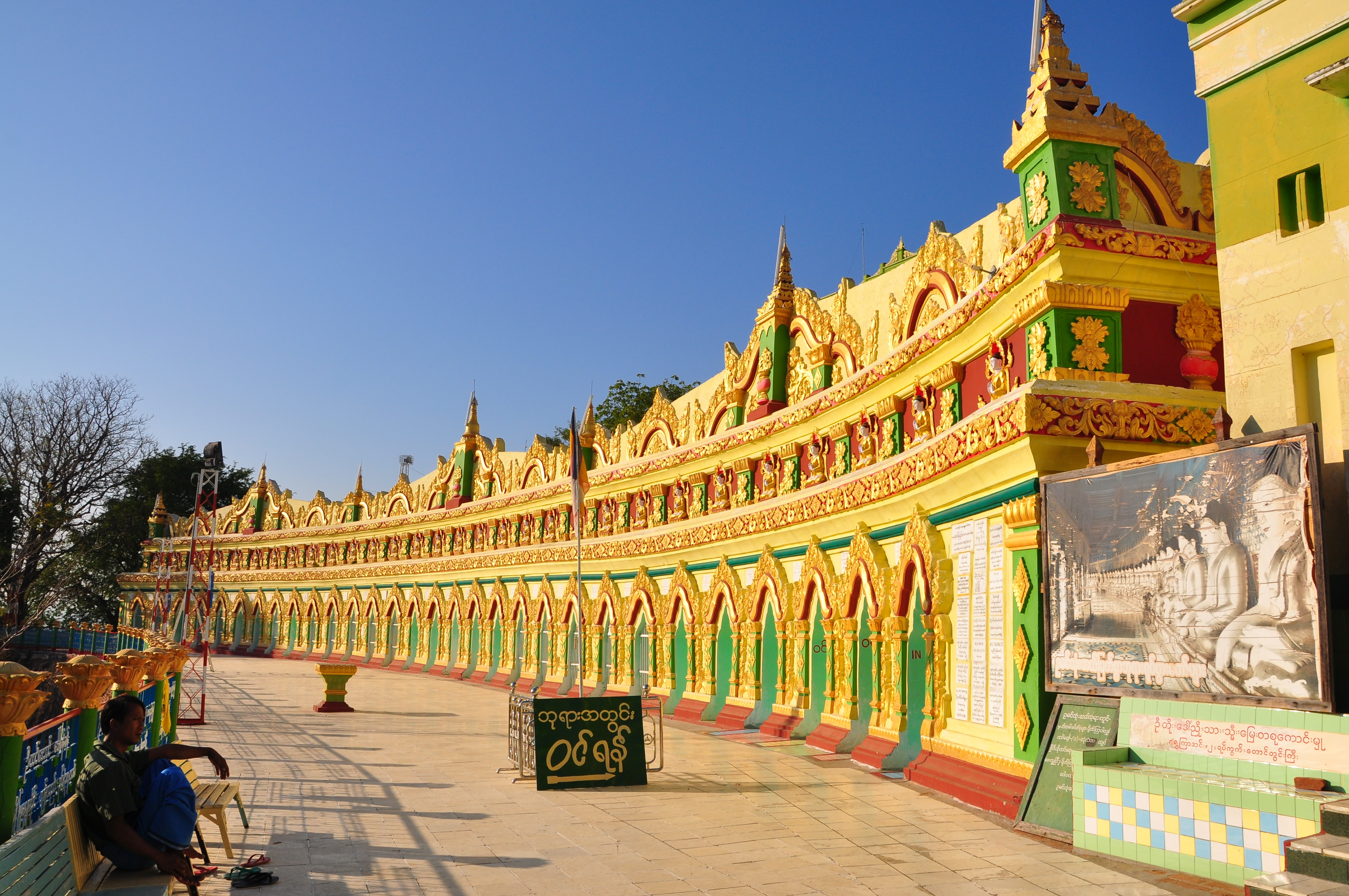
U Min Thonze cave

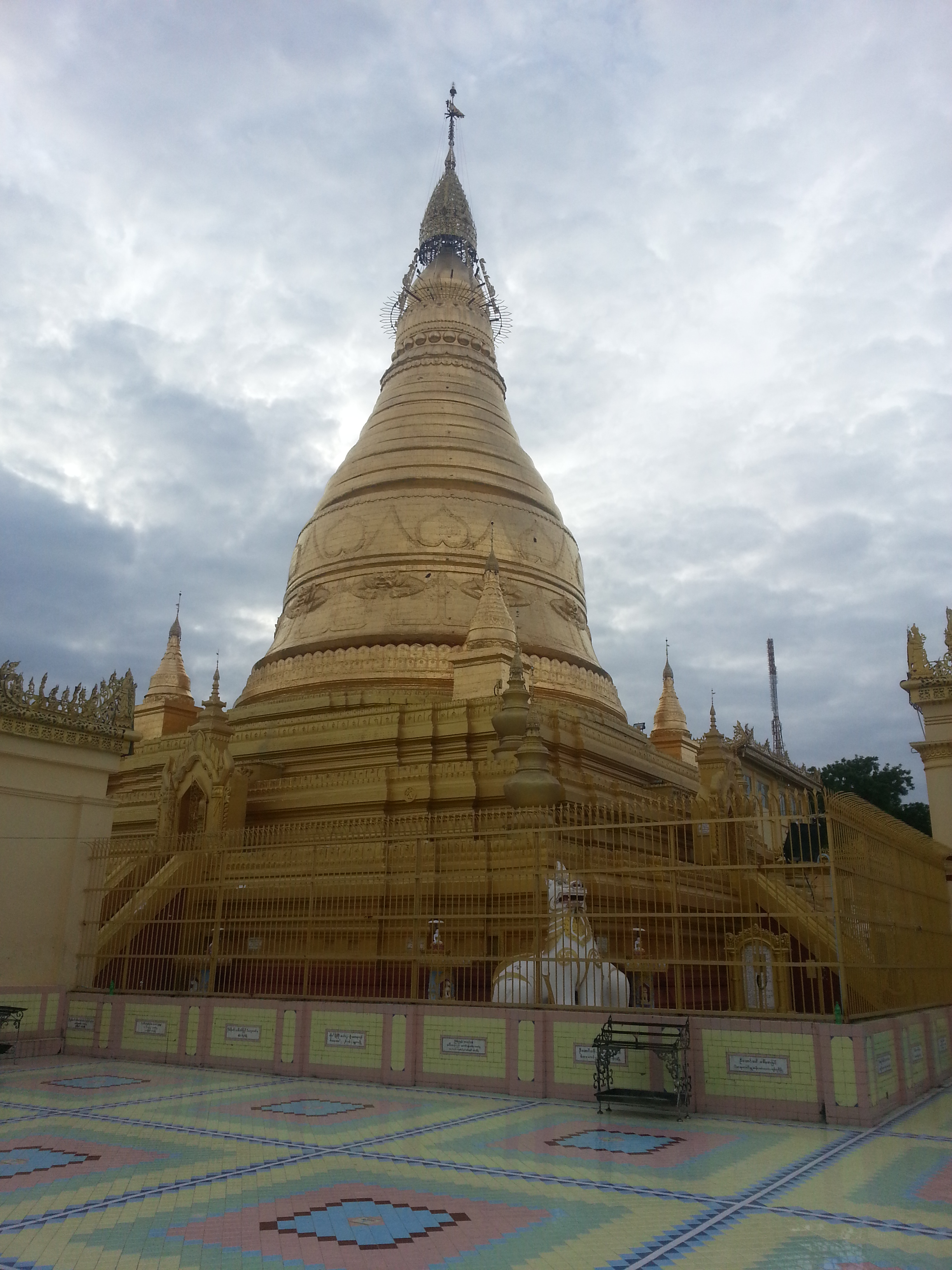
Sone Oo Pone Nya Shin Pagoda, Sagaing Hill

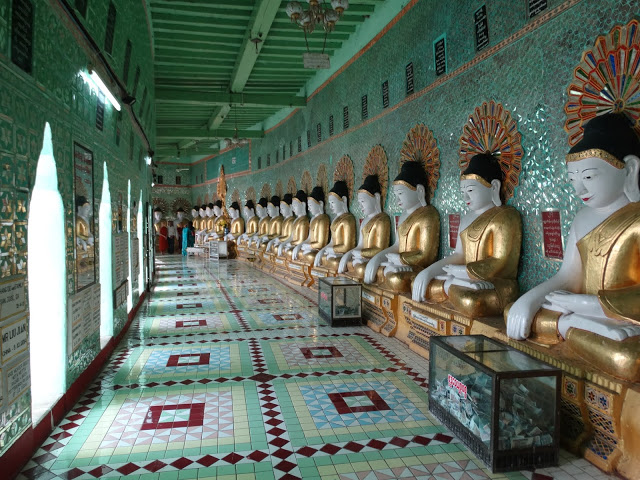
U Min Thonze Pagoda

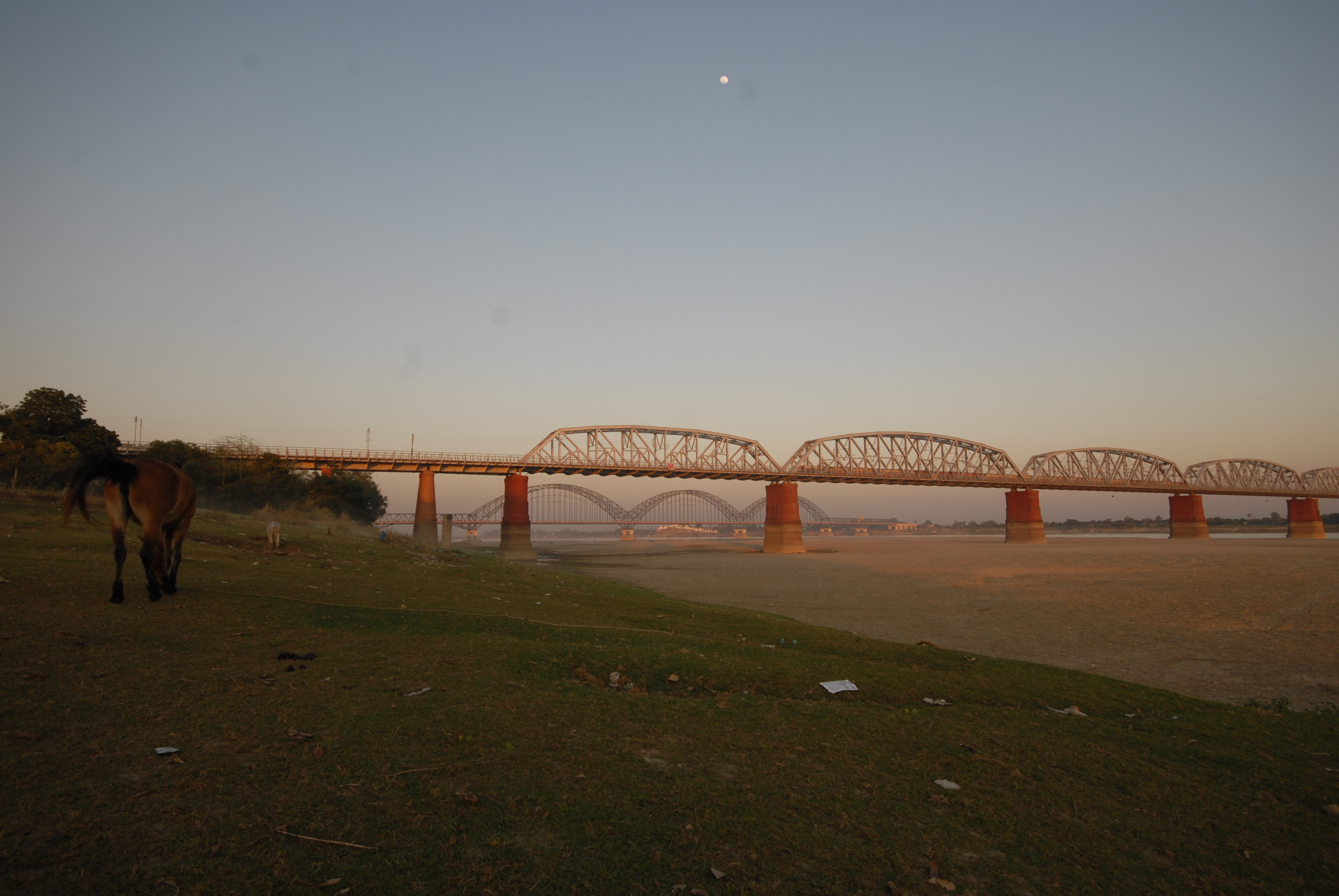
The Ava and Yadanabon bridges, connecting Sagaing and Mandalay

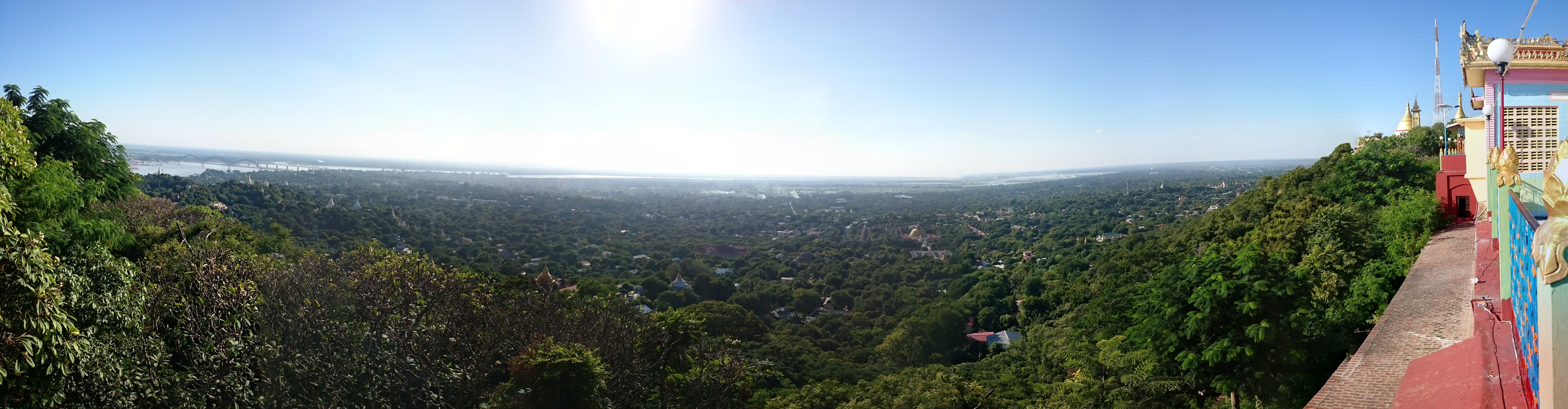
Panoramic view from top of Sagaing Hill

== See also ==
- List of kings of Sagaing Kingdom

Sagaing
Preceded by Pinya	Capital of Sagaing Kingdom; June 1315 – April 1364	Succeeded by End of Kingdom
Preceded by New Kingdom	Capital of Ava Kingdom; April – September 1364	Succeeded by Pinya
Preceded by Shwebo	Capital of Burma; 26 July 1760 – 23 July 1765	Succeeded by Ava
