= Sagaing District =

Coordinates: 22°00′N 95°37′E

- District
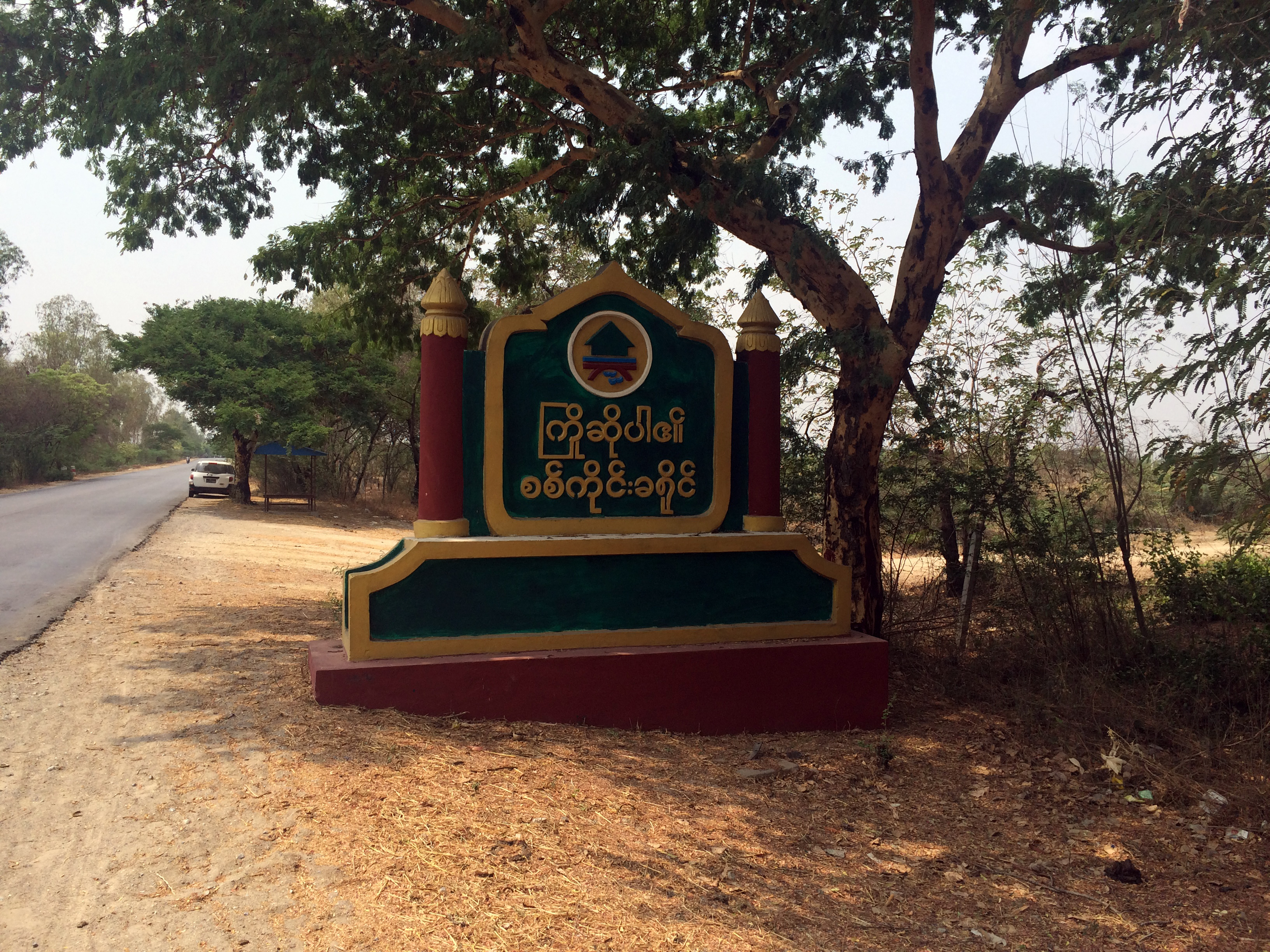
- Sagaing District signboard located on Sagaing-Shwebo road

- Sagaing district in Sagaing region
- Country: Myanmar
- Region: Sagaing Region
- No. of Townships: 3
- Capital: Sagaing
- Time zone: UTC+6.30 (MST)

Sagaing District is the southernmost administrative district in Sagaing Region, northern Myanmar. Its administrative center is the city of Sagaing.

== Townships ==
Townships of Sagaing district

Sagaing
Myinmu
Myaung

Sagaing District consists of the following townships:

- Myaung Township
- Myinmu Township
- Sagaing Township
