= List of universities and colleges in Yangon =

This is a list of colleges and universities located in Yangon, the largest city and former capital of Myanmar. All universities in Myanmar are state-run.

== Universities ==
- Co-operative University, Thanlyin
- Defence Services Medical Academy
- Dagon University
- East Yangon University
- Myanmar Maritime University
- Technological University (Hmawbi)
- Technological University (Thanlyin)
- University of Computer Studies, Yangon
- University of Culture, Yangon
- University of Dental Medicine, Yangon
- University of Distance Education, Yangon
- University of Foreign Languages, Yangon
- University of Information Technology, Yangon
- University of Medicine-1, Yangon
- University of Medicine-2, Yangon
- University of Paramedical Science, Yangon
- University of Pharmacy, Yangon
- West Yangon Technological University
- West Yangon University
- Yangon Institute of Economics
- Yangon Institute of Education
- Yangon Institute of Marine Technology
- Yangon Institute of Nursing
- Yangon Technological University
- Yangon University
- Yangon University of Economics

== Colleges ==
- Myanmar Institute of Theology
- Thingangyun Education College
- Yankin Education College
- Mary Chapman College for Teachers and School for the Deaf
- National Management Degree College (Botahtaung)
