= Technological University, Meiktila =

University in Meiktila, Myanmar

Coordinates: 20°54′47″N 95°51′33″E

Technological University (Meiktila)
- နည်းပညာတက္ကသိုလ် (မိတ္ထီလာ)
- Former names: Government Technical Institute; Government Technological College
- Type: Public
- Established: 2007; 19 years ago
- Location: Meiktila, Mandalay Region, Myanmar
- Website: https://tumeiktila.edu.mm/

Technological University, Meiktila (Burmese: နည်းပညာတက္ကသိုလ် (မိတ္ထီလာ)) is located on the right side of Meiktila-Pindale Road in Meiktila, Mandalay Region, Myanmar. Its area is 51.65 acres.

The University was transferred to the present site in 2008. The former University was in Tawma Village-tract east of Meiktila. It was originally formed on 1 December 1986 as Government Technical Institute (Meiktila) in Tawma Village near Meiktila. It became Government Technological College on 25 November 1999. The University was inaugurated on 20 January 2007 at that place.

== Departments ==
Technological University (Meikhtila) has the following departments:

- Civil Engineering Department (C)
- Electronics Engineering Department (EcE)
- Electrical Power Engineering Department (EP)
- Mechanical Engineering Department (ME)
- Information Technology Department (IT)
- Mechatronics Engineering Department (McE)

== Programs ==
Technological University (Meikhtila) offers Graduate Degree Program and Under Graduate Degree Program.

Program	Bachelor's (6Yrs)	Master's (8Yrs)	Diploma (2Yrs)
Civil Engineering	B.E		
Electronics Engineering	B.E.		
Electrical Power	B.E.		
Mechanical Engineering	B.E.		
Information Technology	B.E.		
Mechatronic Engineering	B.E.		

== LAB ==
Technological University (Meikhtila) provides laboratories for every major courses. Students in every engineering courses learn both in theoretical and practical for their courses.

== See also ==
- Mandalay Technological University
- Technological University, Mandalay
- Technological University, Kyaukse
- Technological University Yamethin
- University of Technology, Yadanabon Cyber City
- List of Technological Universities in Myanmar
