= Technological University, Kyaukse =

Coordinates: 21.6043°N 96.1255°E

Technological University (Kyaukse)
- နည်းပညာတက္ကသိုလ် (ကျောက်ဆည်)
- Former name: Government Technical Institute Government Technological College
- Type: Public
- Established: 2007; 19 years ago
- Rector: Dr Khin Htike Htike Lwin
- Vice Rector: Tin Win Mon, Dr
- Location: Kyaukse, Mandalay Region, Myanmar

Technological University (Kyaukse) is a public university under the Ministry of Education. It is located at Kyaukse Township, Mandalay Region, Myanmar. Government Technical Institute (Kyaukse) was initially opened on 9 December 1998 at Myopet Street, Yesu Quarter in Kyaukse. The board of the government of Union of Myanmar upgraded it to the Government Technological College (Kyaukse) on 20 January 2001 and to Technological University (Kyaukse) on 20 January 2007.

== Departments ==
- Civil Engineering Department
- Electronic and Communication Engineering Department
- Electrical Power Engineering Department
- Mechanical Power Engineering Department
- Information Technology Department
- Metallurgy Engineering Department
- Biotechnology Department
- Nuclear Engineering Department

== Programs ==
- Post Graduate Degree Program
- Graduate Degree Program
- Under Graduate Degree Program

Program	Bachelor's (6 Yrs)	Master's (2 Yrs)
Civil Engineering	B.E.	M.E.
Electronic and Communication Engineering	B.E.	M.E.
Electrical Power Engineering	B.E.	M.E.
Mechanical Engineering	B.E.	M.E.
Information Technology	B.E.	M.E.
Mechatronic Engineering	B.E.	M.E.
Metallurgy Engineering	B.E.	M.E.
Nuclear Technology	B.E.	M.E.
Biotechnology	B.S.	M.S.

== See also ==
- Mandalay Technological University
- Technological University, Mandalay
- Technological University, Meiktila
- Technological University Yamethin
- University of Technology, Yadanabon Cyber City
- List of Technological Universities in Myanmar
