= Technological University, Hmawbi =

Technological University (Hmawbi)

Technological University (Hmawbi)
- နည်းပညာတက္ကသိုလ် (မှော်ဘီ)
- Former name: Government Technical High School Government Technical Institute Government Technological College
- Motto: Our Innovation towards Brighter future
- Type: public
- Established: 1989; 37 years ago
- Rector: Dr.Kay Thi Lwin
- Academic staff: 300 (2019)
- Students: 2,500 (2019)
- Location: Technological University, Hmawbi Township, Yangon(North), Myanmar(Burma); 17.1294°N 96.0064°E

Technological University (Hmawbi), under Ministry of Science and Technology (Ministry of Education in 2016-2021), is located on the east of the Yangon-Pyay Highway Road, near in Hmawbi Township in the Yangon Region, Myanmar. Its area is 78.04 acres (31.58 ha). At first, it was opened as a Technical High School (T.H.S) on 1 June 1989. Then, on 23 October 1998, it was upgraded to the Government Institute of Technology (G.T.I) and Government Technological College (G.T.C) in January 2001. On 20 January 2007, it was upgraded as a Technological University (Hmawbi) also called TU(Hmawbi). All engineering programs in TU(Hmawbi) are accredited by Myanmar Engineering Council, which is the national accreditation body for engineering education. Moreover, it has been an associate member of AUN-QA ( ASEAN University Network Quality Assurance) under ASEAN University Network since 25.3.2018. Furthermore, it has obtained ISO 9001:2008 certificate for Quality Management System in 2015 and upgraded to ISO 9001:2015 version in 2018 from Bureau Veritas. There are a total of 33 Technological Universities in Myanmar and Technological University (Hmawbi), Technological University (Thanlyin) and West Yangon Technological University are best engineering schools in Myanmar after Yangon Technological University and Mandalay Technological University.

== List of rectors ==
Rector Name	Duration	Notes
U Kyaw Lwin	1989 -1991	
Daw Aye Myint	1991 - 23 July 1995	
Daw Htay Htay Kyi	24 July 1995 – 4 August 1998	
U Aung Shwe	5-8-1998 21-12-1999	
U Sai Kyaw Naing Oo	4 June 2007 – 11 April 2008	
U Nyunt Soe	11 April 2008 – 1 July 2008	
Dr. Aye Myint	1 July 2008 – 13 Aug 2010	Moved to Technological University, Thanlyin and then Yangon Technological University and West Yangon Technological University
Dr. Khin Maung Aye	13 Aug 2010 – 1 June 2010	Moved from University of Yangon, then moved to Yangon Technological University, West Yangon Technological University, and Technological University, Hmawbi on 13 August 2010
Dr. Kyi Soe	1 June 2010 - 26 April 2017	Moved to West Yangon Technological University
Dr. Kay Thi Lwin	26 April 2017 – Present	Moved from Technological University, Thanlyin

== Programs ==
1. Civil Engineering
2. Electronic and Communication Engineering
3. Mechanical Engineering
4. Mechatronics Engineering
5. Electrical Power Engineering
6. Information Technology Engineering
7. Architecture

== Departments ==
1. Department of Civil Engineering
2. Department of Electronic Engineering
3. Department of Mechanical Engineering
4. Department of Mechatronic Engineering
5. Department of Electrical Power Engineering
6. Department of Information Technology
7. Department of Architecture
8. Department of Myanmar
9. Department of English
10. Department of Engineering Mathematics
11. Department of Engineering Chemistry
12. Department of Engineering Physics

== Degree Program ==
=== Bachelor of Engineering (B.E) ===
Bachelor of Civil Engineering	6-yrs (Full Time)
Bachelor of Electronic and Communication Engineering	6-yrs (Full Time)
Bachelor of Mechanical Engineering	6-yrs (Full Time)
Bachelor of Mechatronic Engineering	6-yrs (Full Time)
Bachelor of Electrical Power Engineering	6-yrs (Full Time)
Bachelor of Information Technology Engineering	6-yrs (Full Time)
Bachelor of Architecture	6-yrs (Full Time)

== Graduate Degree Program ==
=== Master of Engineering (M.E) ===
Master of Civil Engineering	2-yrs (Full Time)
Master of Electronic and Communication Engineering	2-yrs (Full Time)
Master of Mechanical Engineering	2-yrs (Full Time)
Master of Mechatronic Engineering	2-yrs (Full Time)
Master of Electrical Power Engineering	2-yrs (Full Time)
Master of Information Technology Engineering	2-yrs (Full Time)
Master of Architecture	2-yrs (Full Time)

== See also ==
- Yangon Technological University
- Mandalay Technological University
- Technological University, Thanlyin
- West Yangon Technological University
- List of Technological Universities in Myanmar
