= Myanmar Maritime University =

University in Myanmar

Coordinates: 16°42′11″N 96°15′51″E

- မြန်မာနိုင်ငံ ရေကြောင်းပညာ တက္ကသိုလ်
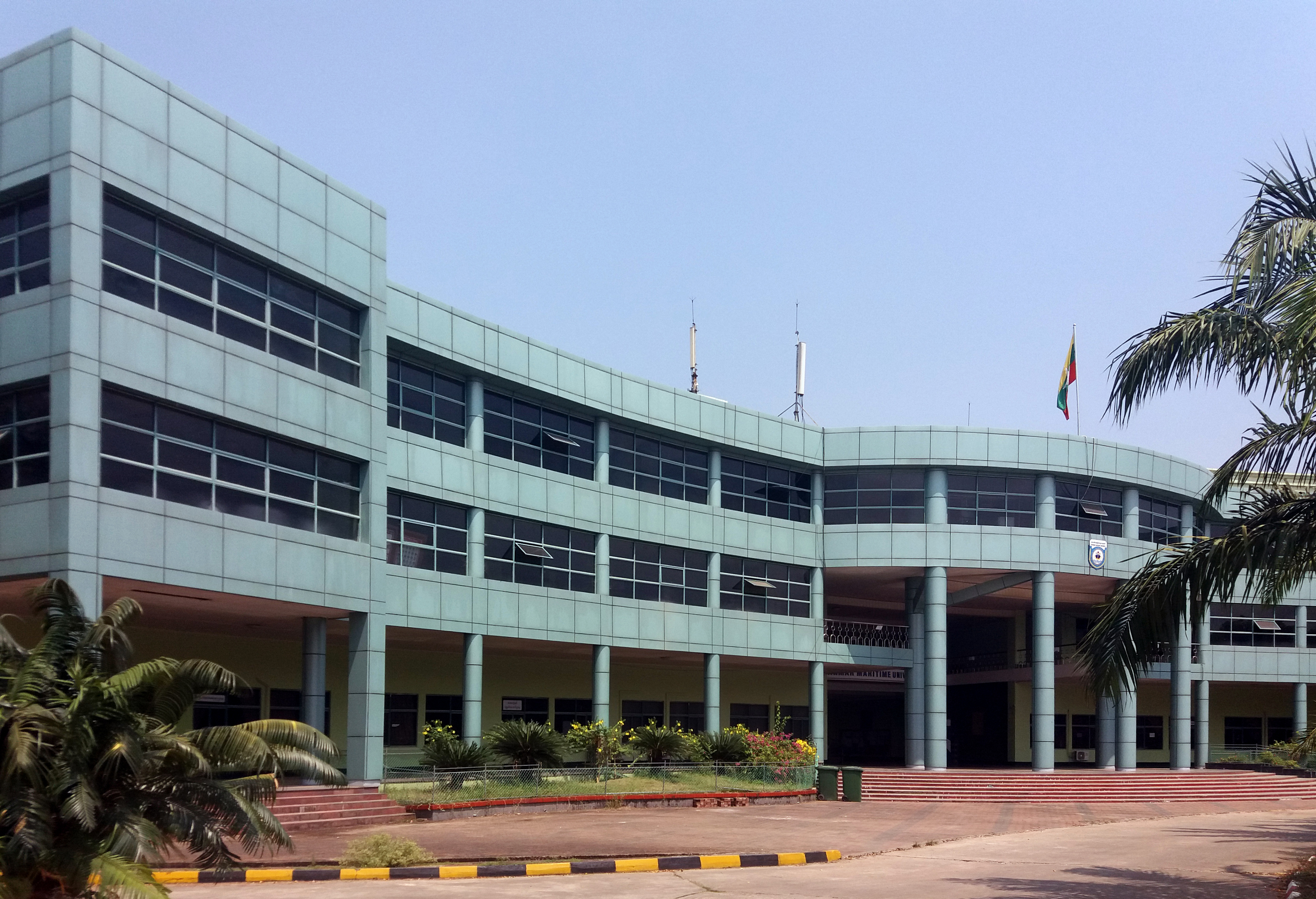
- Main Building of the Myanmar Maritime University
- Type: public
- Established: 1 August 2002; 24 years ago
- Affiliations: Yangon Technological University, Korea Maritime University, Nagaoka University, Nihon University, Tokyo University of Marine Science and Technology
- Rector: Dr. Myat Lwin
- Students: 300 per intake of 2016
- Undergraduates: 1741 (2007)
- Location: Thilawa, Thanlyin 11293; Yangon Region, Myanmar
- Website: www.mmu.edu.mm

Myanmar Maritime University (MMU) (Burmese: မြန်မာနိုင်ငံ ရေကြောင်းပညာ တက္ကသိုလ် [mjəmà nàɪɰ̃ŋàɰ̃ jèdʑáʊɰ̃ pjɪ̀ɰ̃ɲà tɛʔkəθò]), located in Thanlyin on the outskirts of Yangon, is the premier university of maritime education in Myanmar. MMU offers 5-year bachelor's degree programs. Starting from 2012, MMU, administered by the Ministry of Transportation, offers two-year post-graduate diplomas in various marine and naval disciplines. In 2007, the school had about 1,800 graduate students, pursuing international STCW-95-standards compliant maritime education.

== History ==
MMU was officially established on 10 June 2002 by the military government per the Myanmar Maritime University Act (The State Peace and Development Council Law No. 1/2002). The official mission of MMU is to "produce well competent qualified naval architects, engineers and scientists". On 1 August 2002, the university first opened its doors inside the compound of Yangon Institute of Marine Technology, in Sinmalike, Yangon. In March 2004, the university moved to its present purpose-built campus in Thanlyin near Thilawa port, the country's largest port.

== Admissions ==
MMU is one of the most selective universities in the country. Admissions are based primarily on the marks received in the Burmese university entrance examination (Matriculation Exam). The university does maintain a 20% quota of female students in its annual student intake, and all students must pass an eyesight exam. As many of the graduates receive job offers from foreign shipping firms, admission to the university is highly competitive. In 2006, the minimum university entrance exam score necessary to be admitted was 458 out of 600 marks (up from 443 marks in 2005) despite an increase in admissions to 450 students per year from 350 the year earlier. In 2008, the admission marks were 473 out of 600.The minimum entrance mark is 491 out of 600 in 2010.

== Programs ==
Since 2012, MMU offers six six-year bachelor's degree programs and two two-year post-graduate diplomas. The last batch of students with 5-year degree graduated in February 2017. The university's syllabus, coursework and practical training are in keeping with the standards of Training, Certification and Watchkeeping for Seafarers 1995 (STCW), an international convention developed by the International Maritime Organization that sets qualifications and training standards for personnel serving aboard seagoing merchant ships.

=== Engineering ===
Program	Bachelor's	Type	Duration
Naval Architecture	B.E.	FT	5 Yrs
Marine Engineering	B.E.	FT	5 Yrs
Port and Harbour Engineering	B.E.	FT	5 Yrs
River and Coastal Engineering	B.E.	FT	5 Yrs
Marine Electrical Systems and Electronics	B.E.	FT	5 Yrs
Nautical Science	B.Sc. (Hons.)	FT	4 Yrs
Marine Mechanical	B.E.	FT	5 Yrs

- First Year: Myanmar, English, Engineering Mathematics, Engineering Chemistry, Engineering Physics, Computer Science.
- Second Year: NA, ME, EE, PH, RC, MM—English, Engineering Mathematics, Computer Science, Mechanical Engineering Drawing, Applied Electrical Engineering (NA, MM, ME, PH, RC), Workshop, Engineering Mechanics, Marine Engineering Knowledge (ME, EE), Theoretical Electronics 1 (EE)
- Third Year (ME major): English, Fluid Mechanics, General Engineering Knowledge, Mechanical Drawing, Thermodynamics 1, Strength of Materials, Naval Architecture 1, Engineering Mathematics 1, Engineering Mathematics 2

=== Post-graduate studies ===
The university offers two year post-graduate diplomas in shipping management and port management for part-time, and three one-year post-graduate diplomas in shipping management, port management, and transport and logistics management for full-time studies.

== Administration ==
=== List of rectors ===
- Thein Tun (2002–2007)
- Dr. Charlie Than (2007–2013)
- Dr. Myat Lwin (2013–present)

=== Main departments ===
- Department of Naval Architecture and Ocean Engineering
- Department of Marine Engineering
- Department of Port and Harbour Engineering
- Department of River and Coastal Engineering
- Department of Marine Electrical Systems and Electronics
- Department of Marine Mechanical Engineering
- Department of Nautical Science
- Department of Shipping Management
- Department of Port Management

=== Supporting departments ===
- Department of Myanmar
- Department of Computer Science
- Department of English
- Department of Engineering Mathematics
- Department of Engineering Chemistry
- Department of Engineering Physics
- Department of Workshop Technology

== Affiliated academic institutions ==
MMU maintains affiliations with the following academic institutions:

=== Domestic ===
- Yangon Technological University
- Defence Services Technological Academy
- University of East Yangon
- Technological University, Thanlyin
- Yangon University

=== International ===
- Korea Maritime University,
- Shanghai Maritime University, (China)
- Dalian Maritime University, (China)
- Tokyo University of Marine Science and Technology, (Japan)
- Burapha University, (Thailand)
- National Taiwan Ocean University,
- Shanghai Ocean University, (China)
- World Maritime University, (United Nations)
