= List of Technological Universities in Myanmar =

Technological universities in Myanmar

This is a list of Technological Universities in Myanmar. They are administered by the Ministry of Science and Technology.

== Technological Universities ==
1. Pyay Technological University
2. Technological University, Bhamo (Closed)
3. Technological University, Dawei (later became a Polytechnic University)
4. Technological University, Hinthada
5. Technological University, Hmawbi
6. Technological University, Hpa-An
7. Technological University, Kalay
8. Technological University, Kyaingtong (later became a Polytechnic University)
9. Technological University, Kyaukse
10. Technological University, Lashio (Closed)
11. Technological University, Loikaw
12. Technological University, Magway
13. Technological University, Mandalay
14. Technological University, Maubin (later became a Polytechnic University)
15. Technological University, Mawlamyaing
16. Technological University, Meiktila
17. Technological University, Monywa
18. Technological University, Myeik (later became a Polytechnic University)
19. Technological University, Myitkyina (later became a Polytechnic University)
20. Technological University, Pakokku
21. Technological University, Panglong
22. Technological University, Pathein
23. Technological University, Sagaing
24. Technological University, Sittwe
25. Technological University, Taunggyi
26. Technological University, Taungoo
27. Technological University, Thanlyin
28. Technological University, Yamethin
29. Yangon Technological University
30. West Yangon Technological University
31. Mandalay Technological University
32. Technological University, Yadanabon Cyber City
