= Minywa =

Minywa can refer to the following villages in Myanmar:

- Minywa, Sagaing Region
- Minywa, Magway Region
- Minywa, capital of the former Shan state Loimaw, in the Myelat region
