= Charlie Than =

Burmese politician

His Excellency Dr. Charlie Than
- ချာလီသန်း

Union Minister of Industry
- Incumbent
- Assumed office 22 May 2021
- Prime Minister: Min Aung Hlaing
- Preceded by: Soe Win(as MOPFI)

Rector of Myanmar Maritime University
- In office 2008–2013
- Preceded by: Thein Tun
- Succeeded by: Myat Lwin

Personal details
- Born: 1950 (age 75–76)
- Education: Rangoon Institute of Technology
- Occupation: Engineer; rector; Union Minister

Charlie Than (Burmese: ချာလီသန်း; born 1950) is the current Union Minister for Ministry of Industry of Myanmar. He is an engineer, retired rector and guest professor. He also served as chairman of Myanmar Engineering Council and patron of Federation of Myanmar Engineering Societies. He was appointed as Union Minister for Industry by SAC Chairman Min Aung Hlaing.

== Education ==
Charlie Than was graduated with Mechanical Engineering from Rangoon Institute of Technology (RIT) which is now Yangon Technological University. Later he gained Master of Engineering (Marine) and PhD with Naval Architecture.

== Career ==
=== Civil service ===
After graduated from RIT, he has served Irrawaddy Flotilla Company, the Inland Water Transport of the Ministry of Transport. Later he served as Engineer in Alone, Yadanabon and Dala Shipyards. In 1996, he was appointed as visiting Lecturer in Naval Architecture and Marine Engineering Department of Defence Services Technological Academy. Later, he became guest professor.

In 2002, he became the pro - rector for academic affairs of the newly formed university, Myanmar Maritime University. It was one of the best universities in Myanmar with quality systems. In 2008, he was appointed as the Rector of that university. He retired from civil service in 2013.

After 2013, he served as the patron of Federation of Myanmar Engineering Societies. In 2019, he was elected as the chairman of Myanmar Engineering Council.

=== Union Minister ===
In 2019, after the resignation of Khin Maung Cho, Win Myint composed the Ministry of Industry and Ministry of Planning and Finance and formed Ministry of Planning, Finance and Industry (MOPFI). After 2021 coup, SAC separated MOPFI and formed again Ministry of Industry. Min Aung Hlaing appointed Charlie Than as the Union Minister for Industry on 22 May 2021.

In 2024, Than was sanctioned by Canada for his role in supplying aviation fuel and equipment to the Tatmadaw during the Myanmar civil war.
