= Technological University, Lashio =

University in Shan State, Myanmar

Coordinates: 23°01′53″N 97°46′24″E

Technological University (Lashio)
- နည်းပညာတက္ကသိုလ် (လားရှိုး)
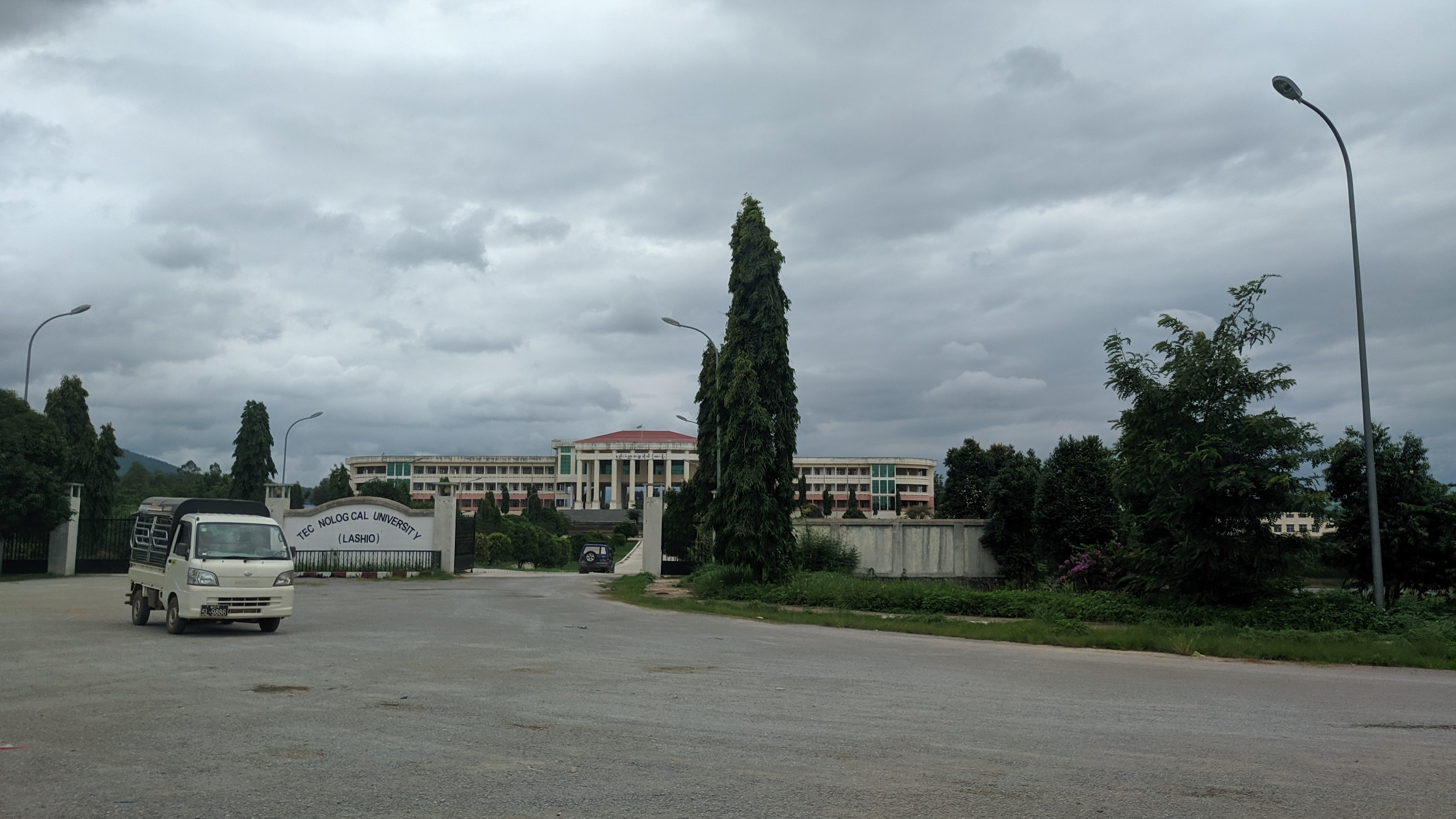
- Former name: Government Technical Institute Government Technological College
- Type: Public
- Established: 2007; 19 years ago
- Location: Lashio, Shan State, Myanmar

Technological University, Lashio, is a public university located along the Lashio–Theinni Road in Lashio Township, northern Shan State, Myanmar. The university is run by the Ministry of Science and Technology. It was established in 1997 as a Government Technical Institute; it was upgraded to university level in 2007. The school has a campus of 55.36 acres. Yearly average graduation students are about 30 students and lower than Taunggyi.

== Programs ==
The University offers Diploma, Bachelor and Master.

Program	Bachelor's (6 Yrs)
Civil Engineering	B.E.
Mechanical Engineering	B.E.
Electronic Engineering	B.E.
Electrical Engineering	B.E.

== See also ==
- Technological University, Taunggyi
- Technological University, Loikaw
- Technological University, Panglong
- Technological University, Kyaingtong
- List of Technological Universities in Myanmar
