= Aw Pi Kyeh =

Burmese cartoonist

- အော်ပီကျယ်
- Born: 24 July 1959 (age 66); Pakokku District, Yenanchaung village
- Known for: Cartoonist

Aw Pi Kyeh also A Pi Kyè (အော်ပီကျယ်; born 24 July 1959) is a famous cartoonist in Myanmar.

== Early life and education ==
He was born in 1959 July 24 in the Yenanchaung village, Pakokku District and given the birth name Win Naing. His father is Thaung Sein and his mother is Khin Aye.

In 1982, he graduated with a BE (Mech) from Yangon Technological University and a MPA (Master of Public Administration) from Harvard University in 2001.

== Career ==
In 1981, he started drawing cartoons in magazines. From 1982 to 1988, he worked as a car engineer and rice mill engineer. He has worked as a full-time cartoonist since 4 April 1989. He also occasionally created advertising designs and CDs.

== Publications ==
- Aw Pi Kye Cartoons - First Volume (အော်ပီကျယ်ကာတွန်းများ ၁) -1990
- Aw Pi Kye Cartoons - Second Volume (အော်ပီကျယ်ကာတွန်းများ ၂) - 1994
- Two Sheep (သိုးနှစ်ကောင်) - 1997
- Domestic Comics (ပြည်တွင်းဖြစ်ကာတွန်းများ) - 1998
- Rates (ဈေးနှုန်းများ) - 1999
