= Technological University, Kyaingtong =

Higher education institute in Shan State, Myanmar

Coordinates: 21°15′43″N 99°39′29″E

Technological University (Kyaingtong)
- နည်းပညာတက္ကသိုလ်(ကျိုင်းတုံ)
- Former names: Government Technical Institute; Government Technological College
- Type: Public
- Established: 2007; 19 years ago
- Location: Kyaingtong, Shan State, Myanmar
- Website: tukyaingtong.moe-st.gov.mm

Technological University (Kyaing Tong) (Burmese: နည်းပညာတက္ကသိုလ်(ကျိုင်းတုံ)) is a public university located in Kengtung Township, East Shan State, Myanmar. Covering an area of 38.38 acres, it was formerly opened as Government Technological Institute (GTI) in 1999 and then promoted as Government Technological College (GTC) in 2001. It was upgraded to university level in 2007.

== Departments ==
1. Civil Engineering Department
2. Electronics and Communications Department Department
3. Electrical Power Engineering Department
4. Mechanical Engineering Department
5. Academic Department

== Programs ==
| No | Graduate Progran | Degree | Duration |
|---|---|---|---|
| 1 | Bachelor of Engineering (Civil) | B.E | 5 years |
| 2 | Bachelor of Engineering (Electronic and Communication) | B.E | 5 years |
| 3 | Bachelor of Engineering (Electrical Power) | B.E | Full time |
| 4 | Bachelor of Engineering (Mechanical) | B.E | |

| No | Graduate Progran | Degree | Duration |
|---|---|---|---|
| 1 | Bachelor of Technology (Civil) | B.Tech. | |
| 2 | Bachelor of Technology (Electronic and Communication) | B.Tech. | 4 years |
| 3 | Bachelor of Technology (Electrical Power) | B.Tech. | Full time |
| 4 | Bachelor of Technology (Mechanical) | B.Tech. | |

== See also ==
- Technological University, Taunggyi
- Technological University, Lashio
- Technological University, Loikaw
- Technological University, Panglong
- List of Technological Universities in Myanmar
