= Technological University, Myitkyina =

University in Myanmar

Coordinates: 25.3889°N 97.3077°E

Technological University (Myitkyina)
- နည်းပညာတက္ကသိုလ် (မြစ်ကြီးနား)
- Former names: Government Technical High School; Government Technical Institute; Government Technological College
- Type: State owned
- Established: 2007; 19 years ago
- Head: Dr Myat Thu
- Location: Myitkyina, Kachin State, Myanmar

Technological University, Myitkyina (Burmese: နည်းပညာတက္ကသိုလ် (မြစ်ကြီးနား)) is located in Kachin State, Myitkyina City, Myanmar. On 1 September 1997, the high school was upgraded to the Government Technical Institute (G.T.I) level and on 2 October 1999 to the Government Technological Colleges (G.T.C) level. On 20 January 2007, it was upgraded from College to University. On 28 April 2006, transfer to Swe Aike Quarter, Panmtee village and open the new Technological University with the three stories building.

== Department ==
- Civil Engineering Department
- Electronic Engineering Department
- Electrical Power Engineering Department
- Mechanical Engineering Department
- Engineering English Department
- Engineering Mathematics Department
- Engineering Physics Department
- Engineering Chemistry Department

== Program ==
Graduate Program	Degree	year
Bachelor of Civil Engineering	B.E. (Civil)	6yrs
Bachelor of Electronic and Communication Engineering	B.E. (EC)	6yrs
Bachelor of Electrical Power Engineering	B.E. (EP)	6yrs
Bachelor of Mechanical Engineering	B.E. (Mech)	6yrs

== See also ==
- Technological University (Kalay)
- Technological University, Bhamo
- List of Technological Universities in Myanmar
