= Myo Thein Kyaw =

Burmese politician

Brigadier General (Retd.) Sithu, Dr. Myo Thein Kyaw
- မျိုးသိန်းကျော်

Union Minister for Science and Technology
- Incumbent
- Assumed office 31 July 2025
- Appointed by: National Defence and Security Council
- Deputy: Dr. Aung Zeya
- Prime Minister: U Nyo Saw
- Preceded by: Himself

Union Minister for Science and Technology
- In office 17 June 2021 – 31 July 2025
- Appointed by: State Administration Council
- Prime Minister: Min Aung Hlaing
- Preceded by: Ministry reconstituted
- Succeeded by: Himself

Rector of the Defence Services Technological Academy

Personal details
- Education: Ph.D. (Engineering)
- Awards: Sithu Degree (2026)

Military service
- Allegiance: Myanmar
- Branch/service: Myanmar Army
- Rank: Brigadier General

Brigadier General (Retd.) Dr. Myo Thein Kyaw (မျိုးသိန်းကျော်) is a Burmese military officer and politician currently serving as the Union Minister for Science and Technology. He is actively involved in supervising and upgrading the academic standards of technological universities and polytechnic institutes across the country, frequently conducting field inspections to provide administrative guidance to regional institutions. He previously served as the Rector of the Defence Services Technological Academy (DSTA).

== Career ==
Prior to his ministerial appointment, Myo Thein Kyaw held the rank of Brigadier General in the Myanmar Army and served as the Rector of the Defence Services Technological Academy, where he oversaw the training of military engineers and technical officers.

=== Ministerial Appointment (2021–2025) ===
On 17 June 2021, the State Administration Council (SAC) issued Order No. 138/2021, separating the Department of Science and Technology from the Ministry of Education to reconstitute the Ministry of Science and Technology. Myo Thein Kyaw was subsequently appointed as the Union Minister.

=== Nuclear Energy Cooperation ===
As the Minister for Science and Technology, Myo Thein Kyaw serves as the Secretary of the Nuclear Energy Program Implementation Steering Committee. He has played a pivotal role in Myanmar's efforts to implement peaceful nuclear energy in cooperation with the Russian State Atomic Energy Corporation, Rosatom. In June 2024, he represented Myanmar in signing agreements with Rosatom for the potential construction of nuclear power plants in the country.

=== Role in Nyo Saw Government (2025–present) ===
Following the dissolution of the State Administration Council on 31 July 2025, a new Union Government was formed by the National Defence and Security Council under Prime Minister Nyo Saw. Myo Thein Kyaw was reappointed to his position as the Union Minister for Science and Technology in the new cabinet.

== Honours ==
In recognition of his service, the title of Sithu, a high-ranking honor of the Order of the Union of Myanmar, was conferred upon him on 2 March 2026.
