= Technological University, Bhamo =

Higher education institute in Kachin State, Myanmar

Coordinates: 24°13′34″N 97°15′55″E

Technological University (Banmaw)
- နည်းပညာတက္ကသိုလ် (ဗန်းမော်)
- Former name: Government Technological College
- Type: Public
- Established: 2001; 25 years ago, 2007; 19 years ago
- Acting Principal: Dr Min Min Oo
- Location: Banmaw, Kachin State, Myanmar

The Technological University (Banmaw, also spelled Bhamo) was initially constructed as Technological College (Banmaw) in December 2001. The main building was opened on February 11, 2002. Construction of a new two-storey building was started on January 1, 2002 by Shwe Than Lwin Company and it opened on July 10, 2005. Technological College (Banmaw) was upgraded to Technological University (Banmaw) on January 20, 2007.

== Departments ==
- Civil Engineering Department
- Electronic and Communication Engineering Department
- Electrical Power Engineering Department
- Mechanical Engineering Department
- Academic Department

== See also ==
Technological University, Myitkyina

Technological University (Kalay)

List of Technological Universities in Myanmar
