= Technological University, Panglong =

Higher education institute in Shan State, Myanmar

Coordinates: 20°54′48″N 97°34′43″E

Technological University (Panglong)
- နည်းပညာတက္ကသိုလ် (ပင်လုံ)
- Former name: Government Technological College
- Type: Public
- Established: 2007; 19 years ago
- Acting Principal: Dr Min Aung Hlaing'Son
- Location: Loilem, Shan State, Myanmar

Technological University (Panglong) (Burmese: နည်းပညာတက္ကသိုလ် (ပင်လုံ)) is located on Loilem-Nansang main road in Loilem District, Shan State, Myanmar.

To establish as Government Technological College, GTC (Pinlon) in Loilem township, Southern Shan State, the construction of main building and workshop of building area 125952 sq.ft was implemented on 1 July 2002 with the permission of cabinet meeting which was opened it on 11 February 2003. The construction works were completely finished on 24 May 2004. It was opened as a Government Technological College (GTC) on 27 September 2002 and then upgraded as Technological University (Pinlon) on 20 January 2007 by the Government. Panglong Technological University Students' Union was established in 2018 with 12 members.

== Programs ==
Program	Bachelor's (6Yrs)
Civil Engineering	B.E
Electronic and Communication	B.E.
Electrical Power	B.E.
Mechanical Engineering	B.E.

== List of rectors ==
1. U Min Min Oo (6.10.2002–5.5.2006)
2. Dr. Zarni Aung (23.2.2005–5.5.2006)
3. Dr. Han Min Tun (6.5.2016–25.9.2006)
4. Dr. Aung Myo Lin (26.9.2016–22.1.2009)
5. Dr. Kyaw Kyaw Myint (23.1.2009–26.2.2009)
6. Dr. Aung San Lin (27.2.2009–30.12.2009)
7. Dr. Kyaw Kyaw Myint (1.1.2010–18.1.2010)
8. Dr. Pan Thu Tun (19.1.2010–8.3.2012)
9. Dr. Oakkar (8.3.2012–8.4.2015)
10. Dr. Min Aung Hlaing'Son (9.4.2015–Non CDMer)

== Departments ==
- Civil Engineering Department
- Electronics Engineering Department
- Electrical Power Engineering Department
- Mechanical Engineering Department
- Academic Department

== See also ==
- Technological University, Taunggyi
- Technological University, Lashio
- Technological University, Loikaw
- Technological University, Kyaingtong
- List of Technological Universities in Myanmar
