= Technological University, Monywa =

Higher education institute in Sagaing Region, Myanmar

Coordinates: 22°04′08″N 95°13′26″E

Technological University (Monywa)
- နည်းပညာတက္ကသိုလ် (မုံရွာ)
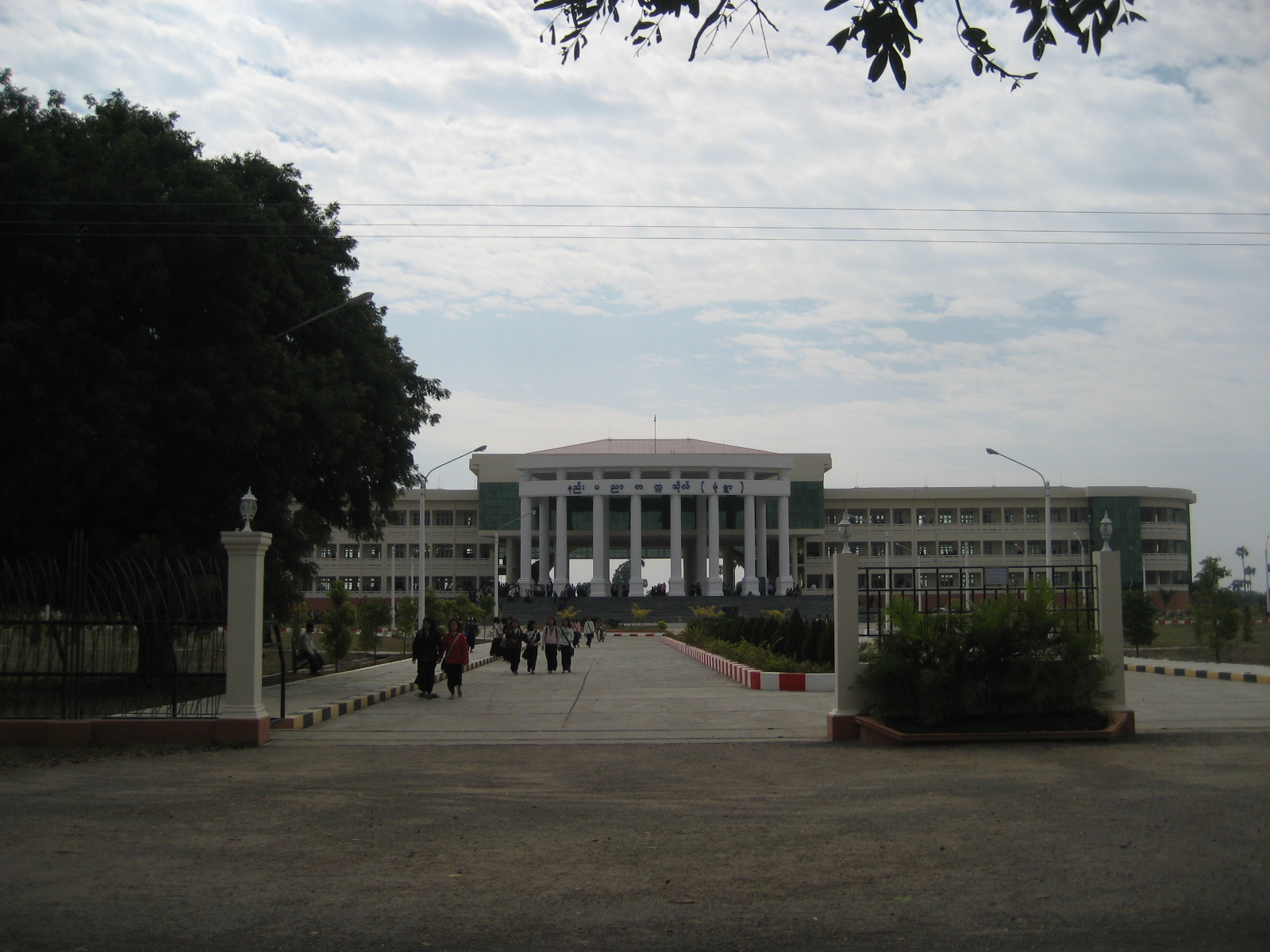
- Technological University Monywa
- Former names: Government Technical High School; Government Technical Institute; Government Technological College
- Type: Public
- Established: July 30, 1982; 44 years ago
- Rector: Dr Myo Nyunt
- Location: Monywa, Sagaing Region, Myanmar

The Technological University, Monywa (Burmese: နည်းပညာတက္ကသိုလ် (မုံရွာ)) is located on a 48.209-acre (19.509 ha) campus in Minywa, Sagaing Division, in northwestern Myanmar. It was established in 1982 as Technological High School. In 1986 it was upgraded to Government Technological Institute, in 1999 to Government Technological College (GTC) and in 2007 to university status. The university offers both undergraduate and graduate programmes.

== History ==
The Institute of Technology (Monywa) was inaugurated as the Government Industrial High School on July 30, 1982. It was opened on November 10, 1999, as well as to the Technical University on January 20, 2007.

During the ongoing Myanmar civil war, the university was involved when protests in Monywa were met with a deadly police crackdown.

== Degree offering Departments ==
- Civil Engineering
- Mechanical Engineering
- Electrical Power Engineering
- Electronics and Communication Engineering
- Information Technology
- Mechatronics Engineering
- Textile Engineering

== Supportive Non-degree offering Departments ==
- Burmese Language
- English Language
- Engineering Mathematics
- Engineering Chemistry
- Engineering Physics

== Programmes ==
Programme	Bachelor's (6 Years)	Master's (2 Years)
Civil Engineering	B.E.	M.E.
Mechanical Engineering	B.E.	M.E.
Electrical Power Engineering	B.E.	M.E.
Electronics and Communication Engineering	B.E.	M.E.
Information Technology	B.E.	M.E.
Mechatronics Engineering	B.E.	
Textile Engineering	B.E.	

== See also ==
- Technological University Sagaing
- Technological University (Kalay)
- List of Technological Universities in Myanmar
