= Technological University, Taunggyi =

Higher education institute in Shan State, Myanmar

Coordinates: 20°45′51″N 97°00′11″E

Technological University (Taunggyi)
- နည်းပညာတက္ကသိုလ် (တောင်ကြီး)
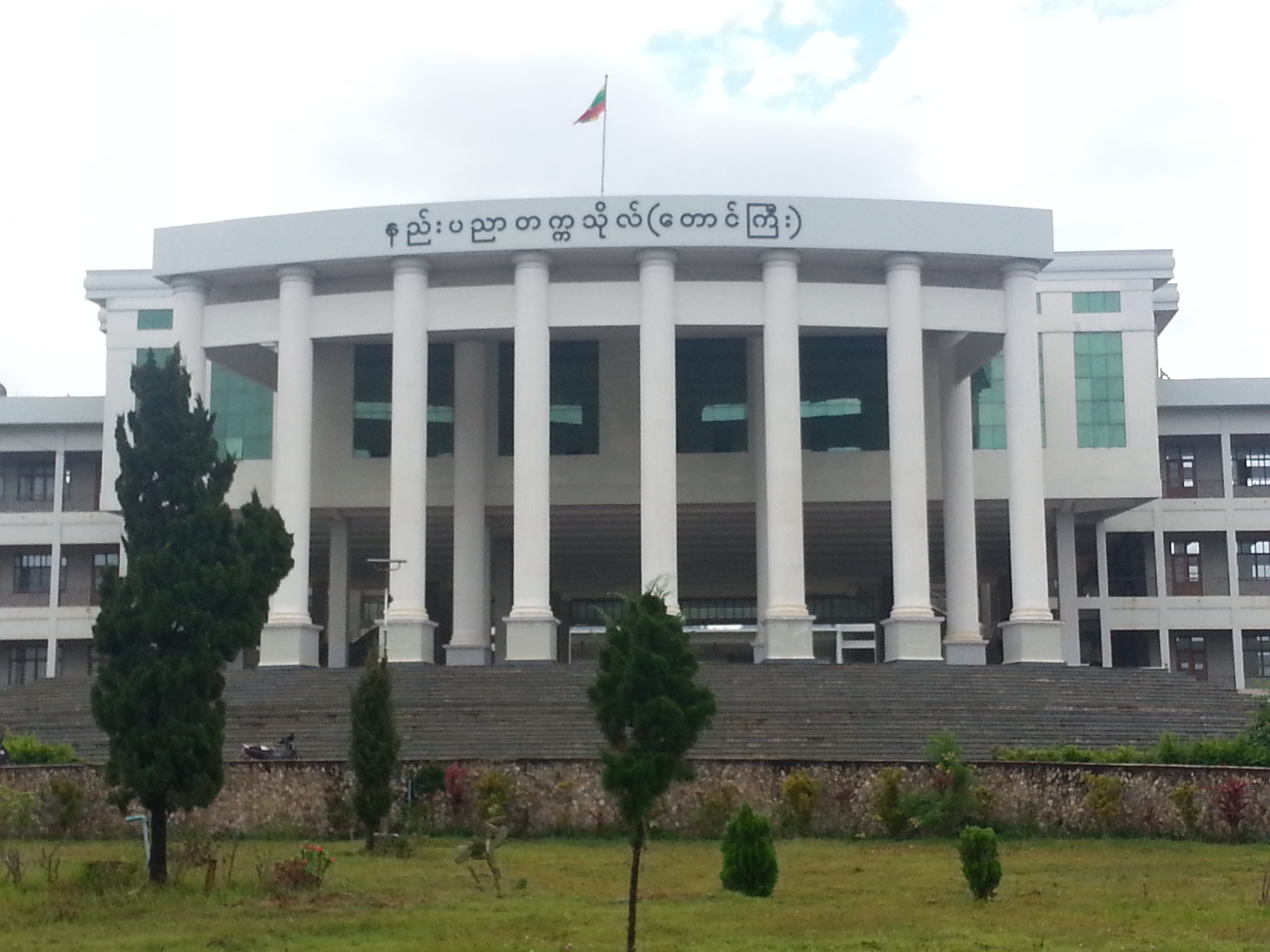
- Former name: Government Technical Institute (Aye Tharyar)
- Type: Public
- Established: 2007; 19 years ago
- Location: Taunggyi, Shan State, Myanmar

Technological University, Taunggyi is situated in Ayetharyar township, Taunggyi District, Shan State, Myanmar. The university is run by Ministry of Education (Myanmar). It was established in 1992 as Government Technical Institute, was upgraded to Technical College in 1997 and to University level in 2007 and it is known as Technological University, Taunggyi. The university spans an area of 84.482 acres. About 500 students graduate from here annually.

The university offers bachelor and diploma programs for these fields:

- Civil Engineering
- Electronic and Communication
- Electrical Power
- Mechanical Engineering
- Mining Engineering
- Biotechnology
- Information Technology

== See also ==
Technological University, Lashio

Technological University, Loikaw

Technological University, Panglong

Technological University, Kyaingtong

List of Technological Universities in Myanmar
