= Pyay Technological University =

Burmese university in Pyay

Coordinates: 18.8382°N 95.3327°E

- ပြည်နည်းပညာတက္ကသိုလ်
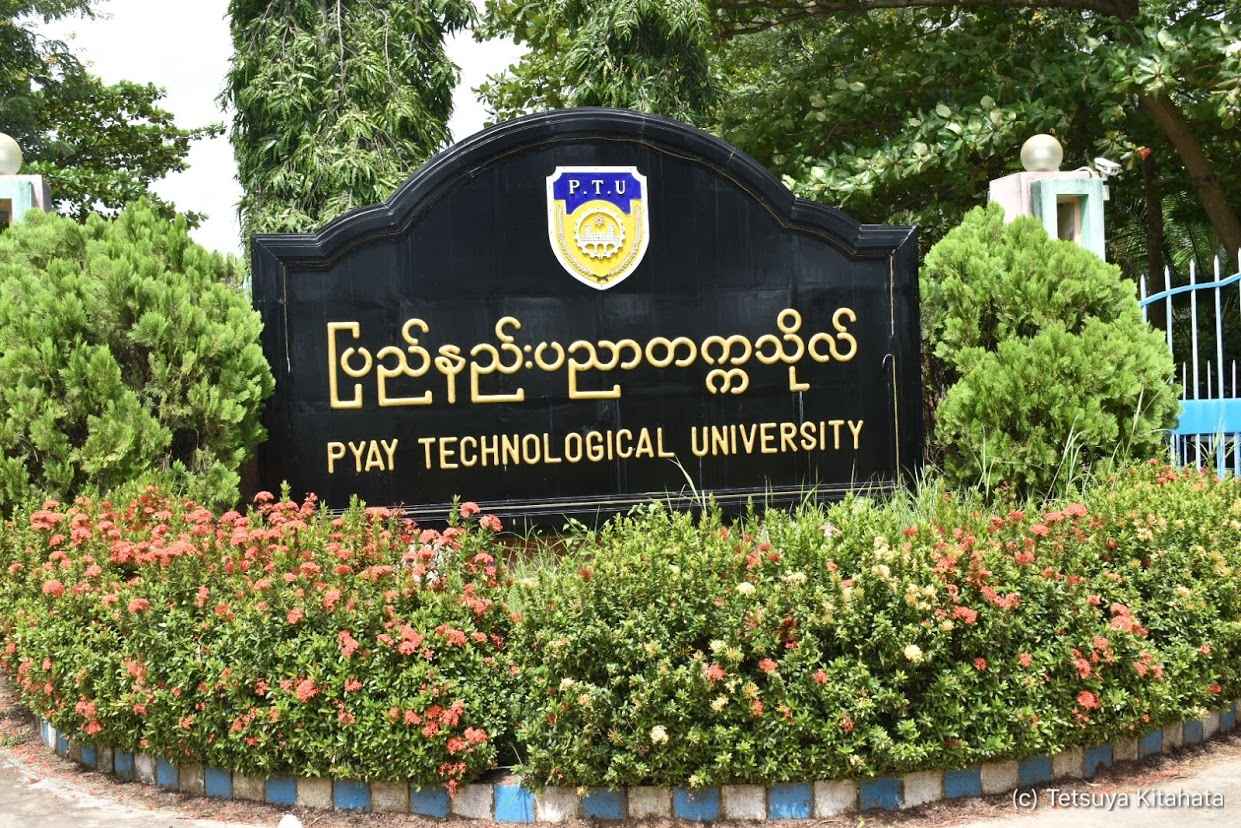
- Motto: Industrial power flourishes
- Type: Public
- Established: 18 December 1999; 26 years ago
- Affiliations: Ministry of Science and Technology
- Rector: Dr.Mya Nandar Lwin
- Location: Pyay, Bago Region, Myanmar
- Website: www.ptu.edu.mm,ptu.moe.edu.mm

Pyay Technological University (PTU) (Burmese: ပြည်နည်းပညာတက္ကသိုလ်, pronounced [pjè nípjɪ̀ɰ̃ɲà tɛʔkəθò]), in Pyay, is one of three senior engineering universities in Myanmar. It offers bachelor's and master's degree programs in architecture and engineering disciplines. The university draws most of its student body from Lower Myanmar, outside Yangon Division.

In comparison to the more established Yangon Technological University (YTU) and Mandalay Technological University (MTU), PTU is considered the least equipped in terms of facilities amongst the three senior universities of technology in Myanmar. Although PTU does offer some Master of Engineering (ME) degree programs, it is mainly an undergraduate school, offering Bachelor of Technology (BTech) and Bachelor of Engineering (BE) programs. Over 95% of the university's graduates between 1997 and 2004 earned bachelor's degrees, while less than 5% received master's degrees. For most graduate and doctorate programs, students have to go to YTU or abroad.

== History ==
On 1 April 1998, PTU was established under the Department of Advanced Science and Technology, one of the directorates of the Ministry of Science and Technology. The undergraduate classes were officially inaugurated on 27 December 1999. On 20 January 2007, the Government Technical College (Pyay) was incorporated and affiliated with Pyay Technological University. Dr. Aung Kyaw Myat served as the first acting rector. In 2002, Prof. Kyaw Sann (prorector) became the rector.

When PTU was opened in December 1999, most universities and colleges in Myanmar had been shut down by the military government since December 1996, following student demonstrations in Yangon. The school closures were part of a series of multi-year school closures throughout the 1990s, following the nationwide uprising against the military government in 1988 that were initiated by the university students in Yangon.

The founding of PTU was part of the government's program to disperse college students away from the established universities and their city center locations to more isolated remote places. PTU was built on a paddy field outside the city of Pyay. In the beginning, the so-called university did not have a drinking water system or any dormitories on its campus. From 1999 to 2006, all engineering students from Lower Myanmar living outside Yangon Division had to attend PTU. Since then, prospective students are required to attend their local Technological Universities, which were "upgraded" to university level. In 2007, the Government Technical College, Pyay was incorporated to PTU.

== Education objective ==
The main function of PTU is to develop human resources by producing qualified engineers, engineering scientists and applied scientists, who will play a vital role in modernization of the country.

== Programs ==
The university primarily offers four-year BTech and five-year BE programs. Each academic year, consisting of two semesters, begins in the second week of December and ends in September.At the end of the second semester, the student need to prepare for their project or excursion (they called field). In 2012, the university decided to change four-year for BTech and next two-year for BE programs due to an agreement of all technological universities in the whole country. In 2014, the university further changed direct six-year BE programs according to the agreement of all technological universities. The university courses are also changed in 2014. The intention of the change-over is to compete with the universities in ASEAN region or international universities.

Program	Bachelor's	Master's	Doctoral
Architecture	<none>	<none>	<none>
Civil Engineering	BTech, BE	ME	<none>
Petroleum Engineering	BTech, BE	<none>	<none>
Electrical Engineering	BTech, BE	ME	<none>
Electronic Engineering	BTech, BE	ME	<none>
Information Technology	BTech, BE	ME	<none>
Mechanical Engineering	BTech, BE	ME	<none>
Mechatronic Engineering	BTech, BE	ME	<none>

== Notable alumni ==
- Pyay Ti Oo

== See also ==
- Mandalay Technological University
- Yangon Technological University
- List of Technological Universities in Myanmar
