= West Yangon Technological University =

Higher education institute in Yangon, Myanmar

Coordinates: 16.8763°N 96.1171°E

- ရန်ကုန်အနောက်ပိုင်း နည်းပညာတက္ကသိုလ်
- Motto: စက်မှုတတ်မျိုး ပြည့်အကျိုး
- Type: Public
- Established: 15 December 2005; 20 years ago
- Parent institution: Ministry of Science and Technology (Myanmar)
- Rector: Dr. Nyunt Soe
- Location: Hlaingthaya Township, Yangon; Yangon Division, Myanmar
- Campus: Urban, 220.32 acres (0.8916 km^{2})
- Website: wytu.edu.mm

West Yangon Technological University (Burmese: ရန်ကုန်အနောက်ပိုင်း နည်းပညာတက္ကသိုလ် [jàɰ̃ɡòʊɰ̃ ʔənaʊʔpáɪɰ̃ nípjɪ̀ɰ̃ɲà tɛʔkəθò]) is a public technology university, located in Hlaingthaya, Yangon, Myanmar. WYTU is the third-best engineering university in Myanmar after Yangon Technological University (YTU) and Mandalay Technological University (MTU). After the YTU building closed due to the 8888 Uprising, the second campus was established in Hlaing Thar Yar in 1996. As a result, some people perceive WYTU (West Yangon Technological University) as a second campus of YTU. This move was an important step in continuing education, providing better facilities and a more stable learning environment for students.

== History ==
West Yangon Technological University was established on 15 December 2005, by the key responsible person of Ministry of Science and Technology. As of 2021, it is under the Ministry of Education and Ministry of Science and Technology. West Yangon Technological University is near Kampyo village, Hlaingthaya Township in Yangon Region. Its campus area is 220.32 acres.

In July 2015, the school was certified ISO 9001:2008 by Bureau Veritas of France.

On 15 December 2025, it passed its 20-years anniversary as a university.

== Programs ==
The following training courses are conducted at WYTU.

- Architecture
- Civil Engineering
- Mechanical Engineering
- Electrical Power Engineering
- Electronic Engineering
- Mechatronics Engineering
- Information Technology
- Chemical Engineering
- Textile Engineering
- Metallurgical Engineering
- Agricultural engineering

== Degrees offered ==
- Bachelor of Engineering (B.E.)
- Bachelor of Architecture (B.Arch.)
- Master of Engineering (M.E.)
- Master of Architecture (M.Arch.)

== See also ==
- List of technological universities in Myanmar
