= Greater Mekong Sub-region Academic and Research Network =

- 大湄公河次区域学术与研究联合体 (Chinese)
- Abbreviation: GMSARN
- Formation: 26 January 2001; 25 years ago
- Purpose: To carry out activities in human resources development, joint research, and dissemination of information and intellectual assets generated in Greater Mekong Subregion (GMS)
- Headquarters: Thailand
- Location: Pathumthani
- Members: 15 Universities
- Website: www.gmsarn.com/sitegmsarn2009/home.php

Chinese name
- Simplified Chinese: 大湄公河次区域学术与研究联合体
- Traditional Chinese: 大湄公河次區域學術與研究聯合體
Transcriptions
Standard Mandarin
- Hanyu Pinyin: Dàméigōnghé Cìqūyù Xuéshù Yǔ Yánjiū Liánhétǐ

The Greater Mekong Sub-region Academic and Research Network (GMSARN) is a network of academic and research institutions in a Greater Mekong sub-region.

Its mission is to carry out activities in human resources development, joint research, and dissemination of information and intellectual assets generated in the region. With an emphasis to complementary linkages between technological and socio-economic development issues.

== Partners ==
The network includes members from various countries:

- Cambodia
  - Institute of Technology of Cambodia
  - Royal University of Phnom Penh
- China
  - Kunming University of Science and Technology
  - Guangxi University
  - Yunnan University
- Laos
  - National University of Laos
- Myanmar
  - Yangon Technological University
- Thailand
  - Asian Institute of Technology
  - Khon Kaen University
  - Thammasat University
- Vietnam
  - Hanoi University of Science and Technology
  - Ho Chi Minh City University of Technology

=== Associate members ===
- Thailand
  - Nakhon Phanom University
  - Ubon Rajathanee University
- Laos
  - Mekong River Commission

== See also ==
- GMSARN INTERNATIONAL JOURNAL
