= Yangon Institute of Marine Technology =

Higher education institute in Yangon, Myanmar

Myanmar Mercantile Marine College
- Type: public
- Established: March 1972; 54 years ago
- Principal: Zaw Lwin Oo
- Students: 9577
- Location: Sinmalai, Yangon, Myanmar; 16°49′49″N 96°7′10.3″E
- Website: http://www.mot.gov.mm/imt/index.html

The Myanmar Mercantile Marine College (M.M.M.C) ([jàɰ̃ɡòʊɰ̃ jèdʑáʊɰ̃ pjɪ̀ɰ̃ɲà tɛʔkəθò]), located in Yangon, Myanmar, is a public institute offering mainly two-year diplomas in mercantile nautical technologies. The institute also offers four-year bachelor's degrees and post-graduate diplomas in select fields.

The institute aims to "train seafarers to become internationally recognized marine personnel, so that they can be employed onboard vessels owned by national and foreign shipping companies".

== History ==
The institute's origins trace to the Nautical and Engineering cadet courses conducted at the naval training school in Seikyi, Yangon Division beginning in 1963 under the joint auspices of Ministry of Defence, Ministry of Education, and Ministry of Transport. In 1971, the precursor school to the IMT, Mercantile Marine Training School, was established. In 1972, the school became the Institute of Marine Technology and was then solely put under Ministry of Transport and its name changed to Myanmar Mercantile Marine College (M.M.M.C).

== Programs ==
The institute offers 47 competency courses, four-year bachelor's degree programs in mercantile marine science and mercantile marine technology, and a post-graduate diploma in maritime transportation and maritime technology. The training courses are based on the International Maritime Organization's STCW-95 standards.

== See also ==
- Myanmar Maritime University
