= Technological University, Mandalay =

University of technology in Myanmar

Technological University Mandalay
- နည်းပညာတက္ကသိုလ် (မန္တလေး)
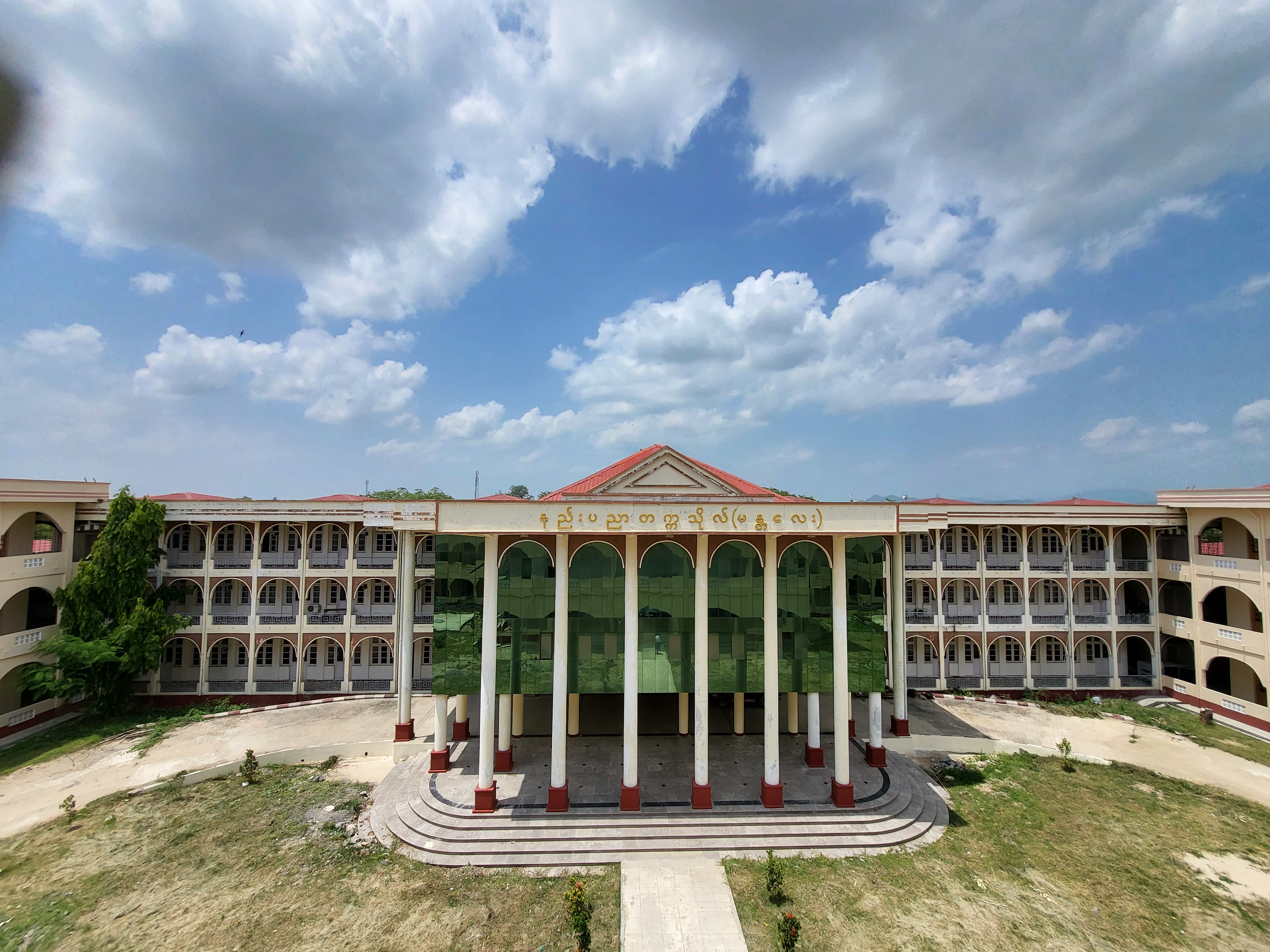
- Other names: TU, Mandalay
- Former name: Government Technical Institute(Mandalay) Government Technological College(Mandalay)
- Motto: The Road To Knowledge Has No End
- Type: Public
- Established: August 1999; 27 years ago
- Location: Mandalay, Myanmar; 21.9721°N 96.1912°E
- Nickname: TUM
- Website: www.tum.edu.mm

The Technological University, Mandalay (Burmese: နည်းပညာတက္ကသိုလ် (မန္တလေး)) is located in northern Mandalay near Mandalay Hill in Mandalay, Myanmar. From 1955, the school was known as the Government Technical Institute. In August 1999, it was upgraded to a Government Technological College. In 2007, it was upgraded to the level of university. It now offers ten bachelor's degrees in engineering and architecture. The duration of the courses is 6 years. The Technological University offers Graduate Degree. Now, the university has attending 3000 students.

== Programmes ==
Program	Bachelor's (6 Yrs)	Master's (2 Yrs)
Civil Engineering		
Electronics Engineering		
Electrical Power Engineering		
Mechanical Engineering	B.E	M.E
Information Technology	B.E	M.E
Mechatronics Engineering	B.E	M.E
Architecture	B.Arch	M.Arch
Chemical Engineering	B.E	M.E
Petroleum Engineering	BE	
Mining Engineering	B.E	

== Departments ==
- Information Technology Department
- Electrical Power Engineering Department
- Civil Engineering Department
- Electronics Engineering Department
- Mechatronics Engineering Department
- Mechanical Engineering Department
- Chemical Engineering Department
- Architecture Department
- Petroleum Engineering Department
- Mining Engineering Department

== Others ==
In final year, 6 B.E., students have to do thesis and projects.

== See also ==
- Mandalay Technological University
- List of Technological Universities in Myanmar
