= Minywa, Magway =

Min Ywar မင်းရွာ
- Village
- Location in Myanmar
- Coordinates: 22°01′18″N 94°05′31″E
- Country: Myanmar
- Region: Magway Region
- District: Gangaw District
- Time zone: UTC+6.30 (MST)

Min Ywar (Burmese: မင်းရွာ) is a village in Gangaw District, Magway Region, Myanmar.

== History ==
=== Myanmar Civil War (2021 - Present) ===
On December 8, 2022, 6 National League for Democracy (NLD) members were arrested and killed in Min Ywar by Pyu Saw Htee militia.

On November 3, 2023, All Burma Students' Democratic Front (ABSDF)-led joint forces seized the Min Ywar police station, killing at least Tatmadaw 20 military personnel.
