= Defence Services Technological Academy =

Myanmar Armed Forces university

Coordinates: 22°02′55.2″N 96°30′03.2″E

- တပ်မတော် နည်းပညာ တက္ကသိုလ်
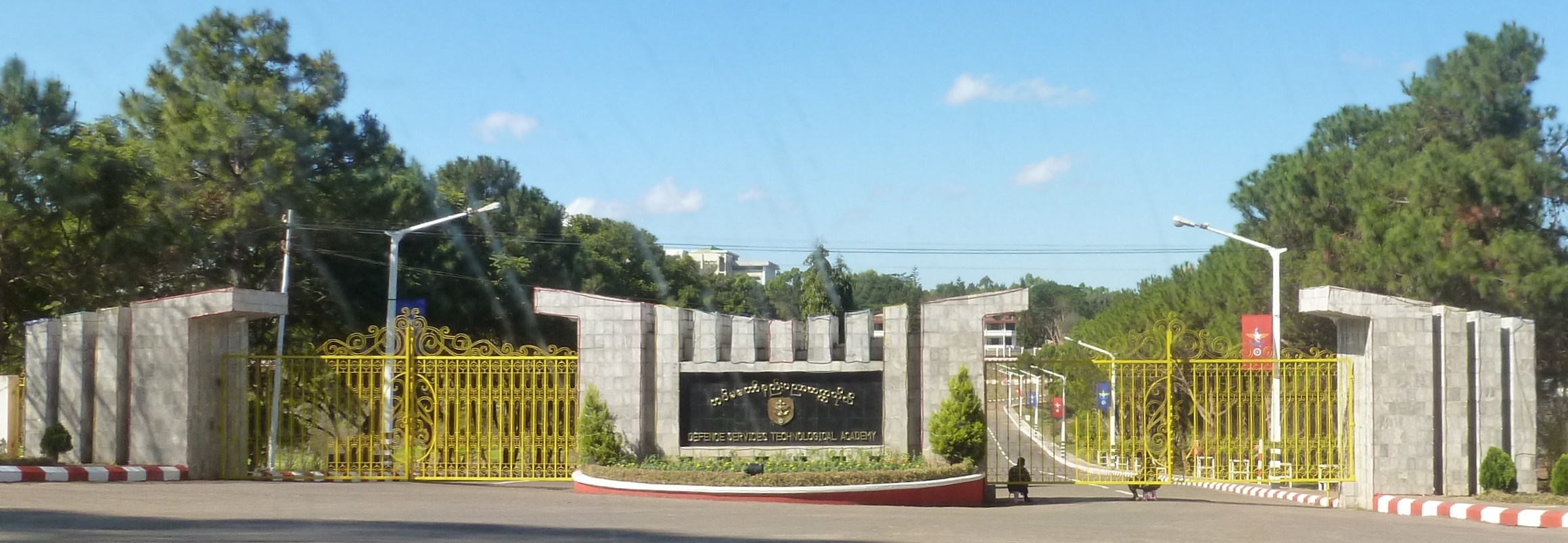
- Former name: Defence Services Institute of Technology (DSIT)
- Motto: ကျင့်ဝတ်၊ တီထွင်၊ စွမ်းအားရှင် အင်ဂျင်နီယာစွမ်းပကား တပ်မတော်အား
- Motto in English: Creativity, Honour, Capability; Technology for Military Might
- Type: Public
- Established: 1 February 1993; 33 years ago
- Rector: Colonel Dr. Myint Win
- Director: Brigadier General Kyi Khine
- Undergraduates: 1800
- Postgraduates: 300
- Doctoral students: 40
- Location: Pyin Oo Lwin, Mandalay Region, Myanmar
- Campus: 4,500 acres (18 km^{2})

The Defence Services Technological Academy (DSTA) (Burmese: တပ်မတော် နည်းပညာ တက္ကသိုလ်, pronounced [taʔmədɔ̀ nípjɪ̀ɰ̃ɲà tɛʔkəθò]), located in Pyin-Oo-Lwin, Myanmar, is the premier technological university of the Myanmar Armed Forces. One of the most selective universities in the country, the academy offers various Bachelor of Engineering degrees to male cadets only. Upon graduation, most DSTA cadets are commissioned as Engineering Officers with the rank of lieutenant in one of the three branches of Myanmar armed forces--army, navy, and air force. Some qualified cadets may choose (or be chosen) to pursue further education in Yangon Technological University, Mandalay Technological University or abroad. Brigadier General Kyi Khine is the Commandant of Defense Services Technological Academy (DSTA).

== History ==
The Defence Services Technological Academy was established as the Defence Services Institute of Technology (DSIT) on 1 February 1993 at Pyin Oo Lwin when all civilian colleges and universities in Myanmar were shut down by the military government, following the 1988 nationwide uprising. The military went on to establish a parallel system of colleges and universities for itself, including DSTA, Defence Services Medical Academy, and Defence Services Institute of Nursing and Paramedical Science. Lt. Col. Win Myint was assigned to carry out this duty.

The first "intake" of students graduated with Bachelor of Engineering (B.E.) degrees in 1999. The academy's graduation ceremonies, as with those of all other military-run academies, are attended by the highest ranks of the military government.

== Admissions ==
As one of the elite military academies in Myanmar, the academy maintains a rigorous selection process, including physical fitness testing, ability for teamwork and comradeship screening, psychometric and general interviews. The entrance selection process takes about 5 to 7 days at Myanmar Military Officer Selection Board in Yangon before 18th intake and after 18th intake, the entrance selection process takes about 5 days at "Officer Testing Team (OTT)" in Nay Pyi Taw. According to official statistics, DSTA takes 1 out of 145 applicants at selection process.

== Programs ==
The academy offers six-year Bachelor of Engineering degree programs in various disciplines, but primarily in Mechanical Engineering and Electrical Engineering in addition to required cadet training.

Cadet training also includes basic military skills, including leadership, through a military programs that begins on their first day at DSTA. Cadets divided into one of two battalions--Anawrahta or Bayinnaung. Each battalion is divided into five companies, in the structure of Burmese army. Most military training takes place during the winter, with new cadets undergoing Cadet Basic Training--or Beast Barracks—the first year, followed by Cadet Field Training in the second year. Cadets are housed in barracks and have leadership positions and responsibilities throughout the academic year.

== Campus ==
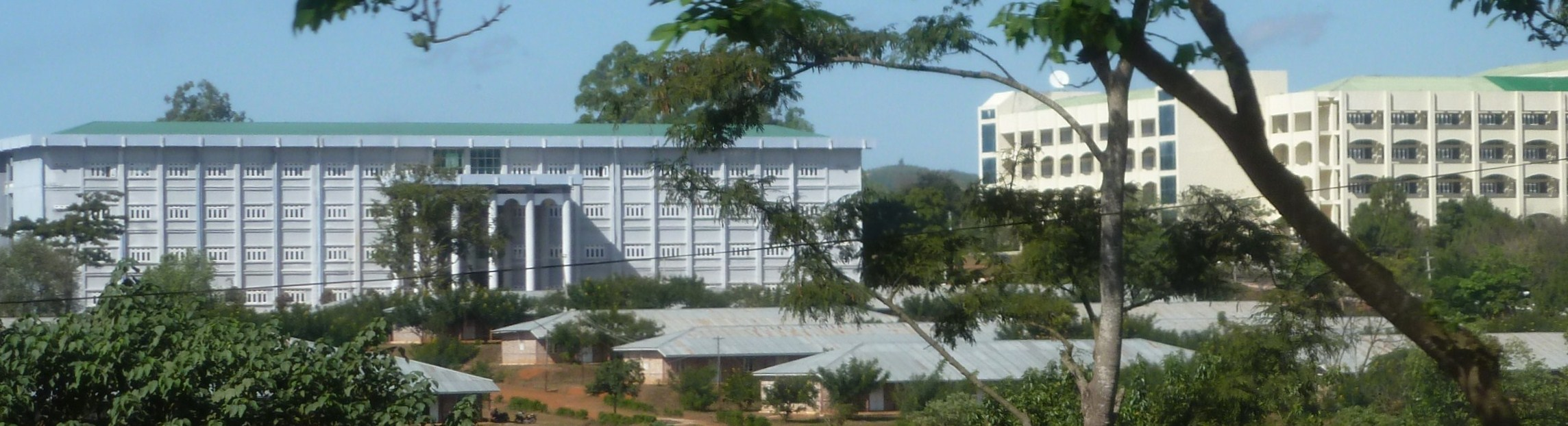
DSTA Halls

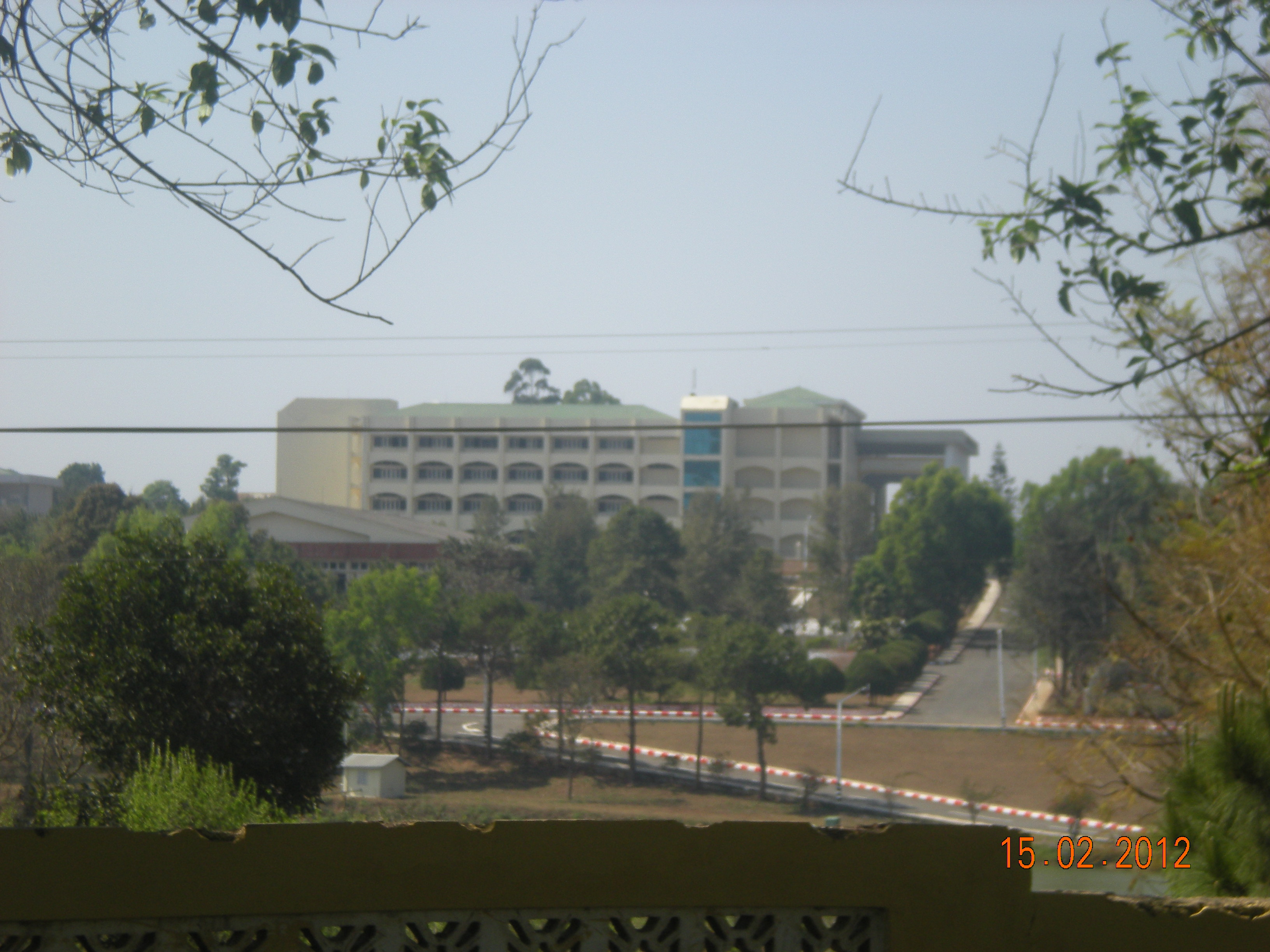

The DSTA campus is located in Wetwun, near Pyin-Oo-Lwin on the Mandalay-Lasho highway, and on the opposite side of town from its brother school, the Defence Services Academy. DSTA is part of the military education facilities established around Pyin Oo Lwin area which is also home to Defence Services Administration School, and the Army Training Depot.

== Engineering majors ==
- Marine electrical system and electronics - Myannar Navy
- Naval Architecture - Myannar Navy
- Marine - Myannar Navy
- Structure
- Transportation
- Water Resources
- Mechanical
- Electronics
- Electrical Power
- Mechatronics
- Aerospace electrical system and instrumentation - Myannar Air Force
- Aerospace Avionics - Myannar Air Force
- Aerospace Propulsion - Myannar Air Force
- Chemical
- Metallurgy

As of 2015, there are no majors for Navy and Air force. Cadets from all majors are selected for Army, Navy, Air force.

== See also ==
- Defence Services Academy
- Defence Services Medical Academy
- Defence Services Institute of Nursing and Paramedical Science
- Yangon Technological University
- Mandalay Technological University
