= Technological University, Sittwe =

Higher education institute in Rakhine State, Myanmar

Coordinates: 20°8′40″N 92°53′49″E

Technological University (Sittwe)
- နည်းပညာတက္ကသိုလ် (စစ်တွေ)
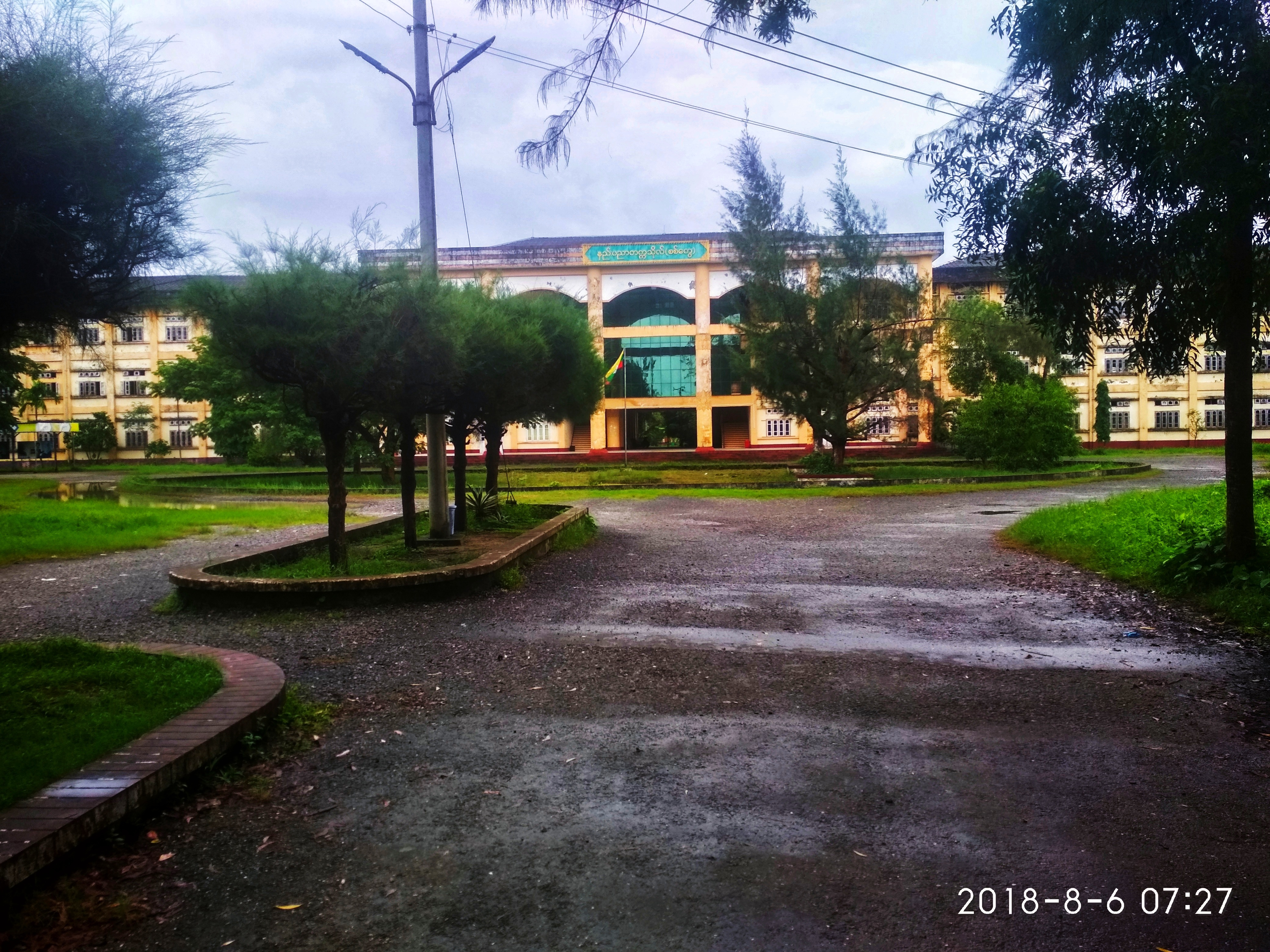
- The university in 2018
- Former name: Government Technological College
- Type: Public
- Established: 2007; 19 years ago
- Acting Principal: Dr Kyaw Hlaing Oo
- Location: Sittwe, Rakhine State, Myanmar

The Technological University (Sittwe) (Burmese: နည်းပညာတက္ကသိုလ်(စစ်တွေ)) is located in Rachanbyin village, Sittwe Township, Sittwe District, Rakhine State, Myanmar. It formerly operated as a Government Technical College (GTC). It wasrelocated to Rachanbyin village and upgraded to university level on 20 January 2007.

In March 2022, Rakhine was designated as the official language of the Students' Union at the university. There are about 600 students at the university.

== Departments ==
- Civil Engineering Department
- Mechanical Engineering Department
- Electrical Power Engineering Department
- Electronic and Communication Engineering Department
- Engineering Physics Department
- Engineering Chemistry Department
- Engineering Mathematics Department
- English Department

== Program ==
Undergraduate Program	Degree	year
Bachelor of Civil Engineering	B.E. (Civil)	6yrs
Bachelor of Electronic and Communication Engineering	B.E. (EC)	6yrs
Bachelor of Electrical Power Engineering	B.E. (EP)	6yrs
Bachelor of Mechanical Engineering	B.E. (MP)	6yrs
