= University of Technology, Yadanabon Cyber City =

Higher education institute in Mandalay Region, Myanmar

Coordinates: 21°52′32.3″N 96°21′59.7″E

University of Technology (Yatanarpon Cyber City)
- နည်းပညာတက္ကသိုလ် (ရတနာပုံဆိုင်ဘာစီးတီး)
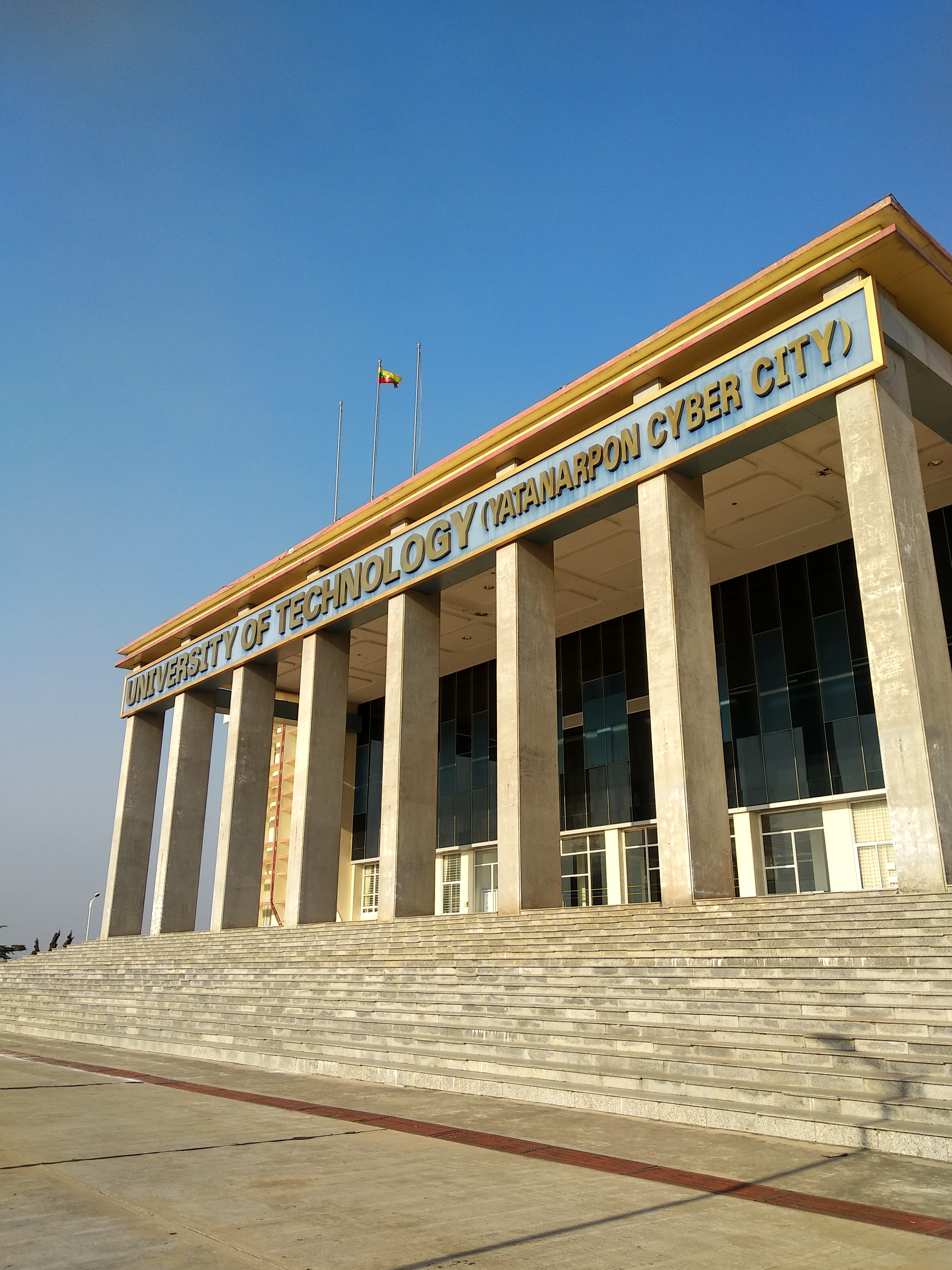
- Type: Public
- Established: 17 October 2010; 15 years ago
- Acting Rector: Dr. CDM
- Location: Pyin Oo Lwin, Mandalay Region, Myanmar
- Campus: 216 acres (87 ha)
- Colors
- Website: utycc.org

The University of Technology - Yatanarpon Cyber City (Burmese: နည်းပညာတက္ကသိုလ် (ရတနာပုံ ဆိုင်ဘာ စီးတီး); abbreviated as UTYCC) is a public university in Myanmar.

Its 216-acre campus if located in Yadanabon Cyber City, in Pyin Oo Lwin, Mandalay Region.

== Programs ==
=== Bachelor's degree ===
- B.E. (IST) Bachelor of Engineering (Information Science and Technology)
- B.E. (CE) Bachelor of Engineering (Computer Engineering)
- B.E. (EcE) Bachelor of Engineering (Electronics Engineering)
- B.E. (MPA) Bachelor of Engineering (Mechanical Precision and Automation)
- B.E.(AME) Bachelor of Engineering (Materials and Metallurgy)

=== Master Program ===
- M.E. (Information Science and Technology)
- M.E. (Computer Engineering)
- M.E. (Electronics Engineering)
- M.E. (Materials and Metallurgy)
- M.E. (Mechanical Precision & Automation)

=== Doctorate Program ===
- Ph.D (Information Technology)

== Faculties and departments ==
=== Faculties ===
- Faculty of Information and Communication Technology
  - Department of Information Science and Technology
  - Department of Computer Engineering
- Faculty of Electronics Engineering
- Faculty of Advanced Materials Engineering
- Faculty of Precision Engineering

=== Academic departments ===
- Department of Myanmar
- Department of English
- Department of Engineering Mathematics
- Department of Engineering Physics
- Department of Engineering Chemistry

=== Supporting departments ===
- Maintenance
- Administration
- Finance
- Student Affairs
