= Minywa, Sagaing =

Village in Sagaing Region, Myanmar

Coordinates: 22°09′59″N 95°31′27″E

Minywa (Burmese: မင်းရွာ) is a village in the Monywa District, Sagaing Region in central Myanmar.
