= Technological University, Thanlyin =

Burmese university in Thanlyin, Myanmar

Coordinates: 16°41′28″N 96°18′09″E

Thanlyin Technological University
- သန်လျင် နည်းပညာ တက္ကသိုလ်
- Motto: Our Technology To Develop Our Nation
- Type: Public
- Established: 2007; 19 years ago
- Affiliations: Asia Technological University Network, ASEAN University Network
- Rector: Dr Myo Zaw Min
- Faculty: 158
- Administrative staff: 54 (2009)
- Students: 4000
- Undergraduates: 2500
- Location: Thanlyin 11292; Yangon Division, Myanmar
- Campus: Urban, 310.05 acres (125.47 ha)
- Website: tuthanlyin.edu.mm

Technological University, Thanlyin (Burmese: နည်းပညာ တက္ကသိုလ် (သန်လျင်), pronounced [nípjɪ̀ɰ̃ɲà tɛʔkəθò (θàɰ̃ljɪ̀ɰ̃)]) is a technological university, located in Thanlyin, Yangon Division, Myanmar. The Ministry of Education-run university offers bachelor's degree programs in Engineering and Architecture and master's degree programs in Engineering and Architecture.

It is the second earliest university in Myanmar which has been recognized as an associate member of ASEAN University Network , and the first technological university which has also been certified AUN-QA (ASEAN University Network Quality Assurance) in 2017. And, it will soon be a core member of AUN. In addition, it is also a member of ATU-Net (Asia Technological University Network) . Then, most of its engineering majors are fully accredited or provisionally accredited by Engineering Education Accreditation Committee. Besides, it has obtained ISO 9001:2008 and ISO 9001:2015 certifications from BUREAU VERITAS established in 1828. Lastly, it is ranked 2nd among 33 technological universities, and 8th out of 164 universities around the country.

== History ==
Technological University (Thanlyin), commonly known as TU (Thanlyin), is one of Myanmar’s leading institutions for engineering and technology education. It has grown into a major center for producing skilled Engineers and Architecture professionals for the development of country.

The university was originally established as the Industrial Training Center in 1986 under the Department of Technical and Vocational Education, Ministry of Science and Technology. Later, it was upgraded to Government Technical Institute (GTI) in 1993, then to Government Technological College (GTC) in 1998, and finally elevated to the status of Technological University (Thanlyin) in 2007. The university's 125 hectare (310-acre) campus is between Thanlyin Township, and closer to Kyauktan Township.

The university has a large campus in Thanlyin, equipped with lecture halls, laboratories, workshops, libraries, ICT facilities, sport center, research center and student dormitories. It accommodates thousands of students each year, producing graduates who contribute to infrastructure, industry, and technology development in Myanmar.

TU ( Thanlyin ) plays a significant role in Myanmar’s human resource development, especially in the engineering and architecture. It collaborates with international universities and organizations to improve its academic standards. The university encourages students to engage in research, innovation, and entrepreneurship, helping Myanmar’s transition into the digital economy. In July 2025, 6 Accredited Engineering Programme have been approved by Engineering Education Accreditation Committee which follows accordance with the internationally recognized Federation of Engineering Institutions of Asia and the Pacific FEIAP guidelines of the Myanmar Engineering Council, Myanmar.

== Programs ==
The university offered 10 semesters for BE and BArch and two-year ME programs. Students are accepted to TU, Thanlyin's undergraduate programs based on their scores from the annual university entrance examinations. Since 2024-2025 AY, the university offers 10 semesters Bachelor of Engineering and Bachelor of Arch. The students who qualify the entry requirement can apply to Technological University (Thanlyin) from any region of Myanmar. In 2025, more than 300 final year students will graduate and Technological University (Thanlyin) will accept 450 new intake.

Program	Bachelor's	Master's	Doctoral
Architecture	B.Arch.		
Civil engineering	B.E.	M.E.	
Chemical engineering	B.E.	M.E.	
Electrical power engineering	B.E.	M.E.	
Electronic engineering	B.E.	M.E.	
Information technology engineering	B.E.	M.E.	
Mechanical engineering	B.E.	M.E.	
Mechatronics engineering	B.E.	M.E.	
Petroleum engineering	B.E.	M.E.	

== Departments ==
=== Academic Departments ===
- Department of Myanmar
- Department of English
- Department of Engineering Mathematics
- Department of Engineering Chemistry
- Department of Engineering Physics

=== Engineering Departments ===
- Department of Architecture
- Department of Civil Engineering
- Department of Information Technology Engineering
- Department of Electronic Engineering
- Department of Mechanical Engineering
- Department of Mechatronics Engineering
- Department of Electrical Power Engineering
- Department of Chemical Engineering
- Department of Petroleum Engineering

=== Supporting Departments ===
- Department of Student Affairs
- Department of Human Resource Development
- Department of International Relations
- Department of Internal QA

== International Affiliations ==
TU (Thanlyin) is a member of Asia Technological University Network (ATU-Net), and associate member of ASEAN University Network (AUN). It is also a member of SEAMEO Schools' Network. The university has academic affiliations with many international technological universities.

== See also ==
- Yangon Technological University
- Mandalay Technological University
- List of Technological Universities in Myanmar
