= Technological University, Yamethin =

Higher education institute in Mandalay Region, Myanmar

Coordinates: 20°24′46″N 96°08′29″E

Technological University (Yamethin)
- နည်းပညာတက္ကသိုလ် (ရမည်းသင်း)
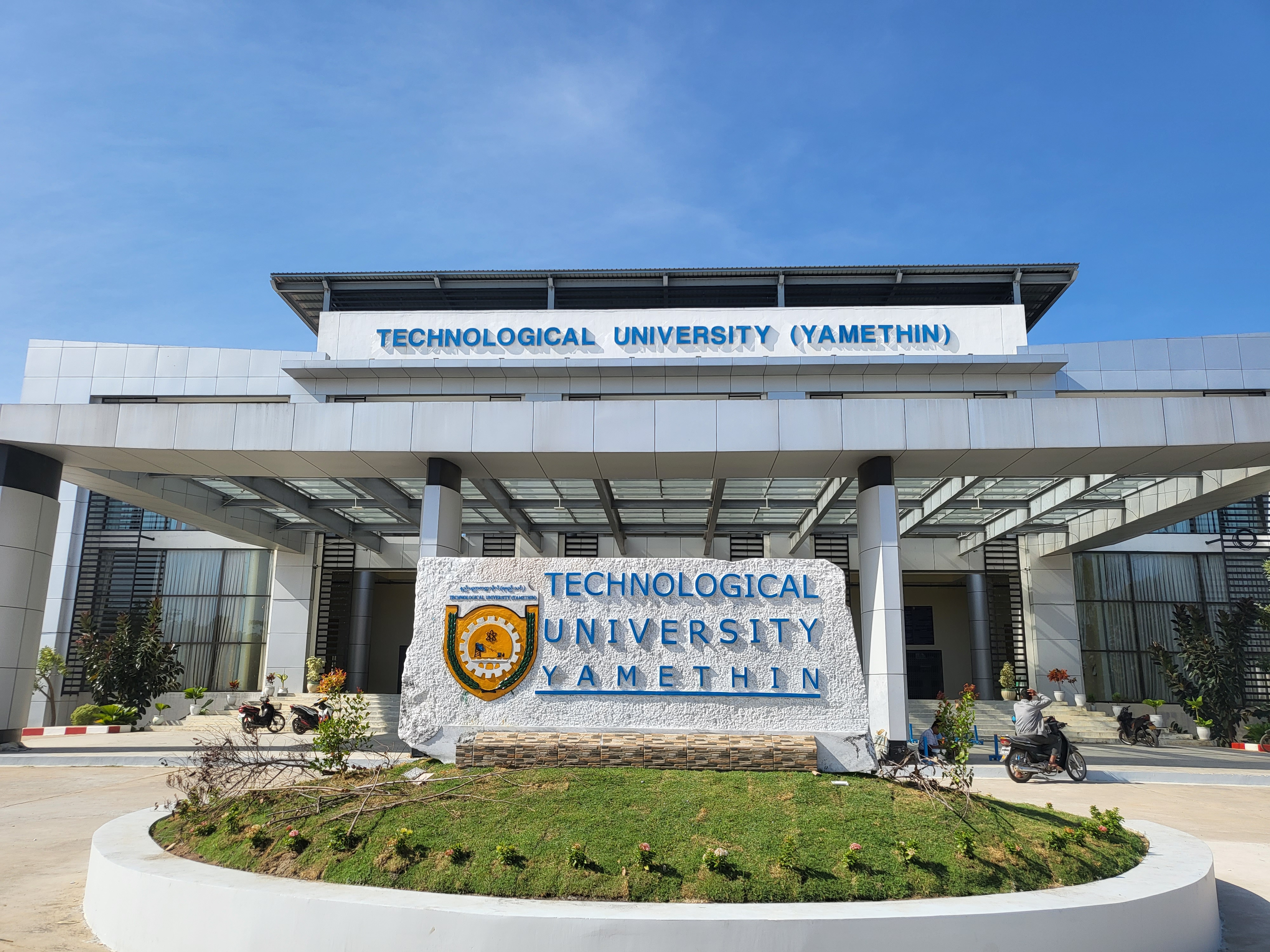
- Former names: Government Technical Institute; Government Technological College
- Type: Public
- Established: 2010
- Acting Rector: Dr. Myat Thu
- Location: Yamethin, Mandalay Region, Myanmar

Technological University (Yamethin) (Burmese: နည်းပညာတက္ကသိုလ် (ရမည်းသင်း)) is located at Yamethin, Mandalay Region of Myanmar. It was established as the Government Technical Institute (GTI) under the Department of Technological Promotion and Coordination on 11 November 1999. It was upgraded to Government Technological College (GTC) on 24 April 2009 and on 22 April 2010, to the Technological University- Yamethin (TU-YMT) under the Ministry of Science and Technology.

== Department ==
- Civil Engineering Department
- Electronic and Communication Department
- Electrical Power Engineering Department
- Mechanical Power Engineering Department
- Academic Department

== Program ==
The university offers Bachelor of Engineering, Bachelor of Technology and A.G.T.I in civil engineering, electronic and communication engineering, electrical power engineering and mechanical engineering.
