= Technological University, Kalay =

Higher education institute in Sagaing Region, Myanmar

Technological University (Kalay)
- နည်းပညာတက္ကသိုလ် (ကလေး)
- Former names: Government Technical Institute; Government Technological College
- Type: Public
- Established: 2007; 19 years ago
- Location: Kalay, Sagaing, Myanmar; 23°07′32″N 94°01′30″E

Technological University (Kalay) (Burmese: နည်းပညာတက္ကသိုလ် (ကလေး)) is a technological university under the Ministry of Science and Technology. It is situated in the Tharyarwady village, south of the Kalay, Sagaing Region, Myanmar. It was established as Government Technical Institute on 1999. Then it was changed into Government Technological College on 2001 and upgraded into University on 2007.

== Departments ==
1. Civil Engineering Department
2. Electronic and Communication Department
3. Electrical Power Engineering Department
4. Mechanical Engineering Department

== Programs ==
The university offered Bachelor of Engineering and Bachelor of Technology till 2017. From 2018, the university offers only Bachelor of Engineering.

== See also ==
- Technological University, Monywa
- Technological University Sagaing
- List of Technological Universities in Myanmar
