= Technological University, Loikaw =

University of technology inKayah State, Myanmar

- နည်းပညာ တက္ကသိုလ် (လွိုင်ကော်)
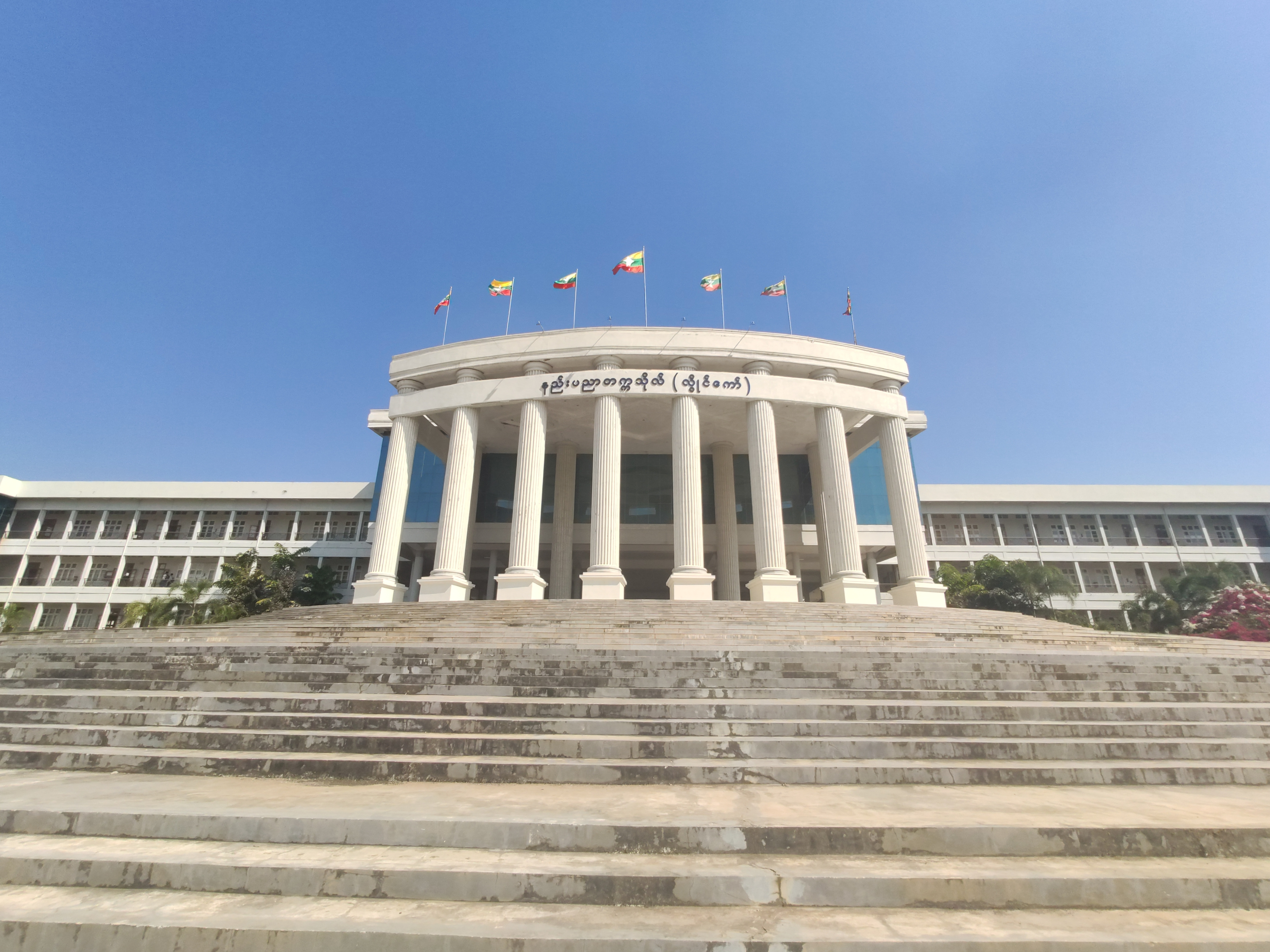
- Main building
- Former names: Government Technical High School; Government Technical Institute; Government Technological College
- Motto in English: Technology for the nation, innovation for the future
- Type: Public
- Established: 30 July 1982; 44 years ago as (GTHS); 10 September 2001; 25 years ago as (TU)
- Affiliations: Ministry of Science and Technology
- Vice-president: Le`Le` Phyoe (Register)
- Rector: Zaw Win Aung
- Principal: Swe Swe Myint (acting)
- Administrative staff: 126
- Students: 875 (2020)
- Location: Ywatan Shay village, Loikaw Township, Kayah State, Myanmar; 19.6545°N 97.2075°E
- Campus: 6
- Language: Burmese
- Colours
- Mascot: Kinnara
- Website: tuloikaw.edu.mm

Technological University, Loikaw (Burmese: နည်းပညာ တက္ကသိုလ် (လွိုင်ကော်)) is in part 260, Pangan village track, in the east of Ywatan Shay village, Loikaw Township, Kayah State, Myanmar. It offers graduate and undergraduate degrees in several engineering disciplines. It received ISO (9001/2008) certification in 2016.

== History ==
TU (Loikaw) was initially established as Government Technical High School on 30 July 1982. Then, it was promoted to Government Technical Institute on 1 December 1998. It was upgraded to Government Technological College on 10 September 2001. It was promoted to Technological University on 20 January 2007.

The university saw fighting during Operation 1111 of the current civil war in July 2024.

== Aims and duties ==
=== Vision ===
- To produce internationally qualified engineers to meet society's needs.
- To become internationally recognized university.

=== Mission ===
- To develop human resources by producing qualified engineers to meet local and global need and challenges.
- To provide state development getting opportunity of studying engineering subjects to increase job opportunity for the youth in the state.

== Departments ==
- Civil Engineering Department
- Electronics and Communication Engineering Department
- Electrical Power Engineering Department
- Mechanical Power Engineering Department
- Engineering Supporting Department
- Administrative Department

== Programs ==
Due to the new program of MOST, the university offers only Bachelor of Engineering in the 2014–2015 academic year.

Graduate programs	Degree	year
Bachelor of Civil Engineering	B.E. (Civil)	6 years
Bachelor of Electronic and Communication Engineering	B.E. (EC)	6 years
Bachelor of Electrical Power Engineering	B.E. (EP)	6 years
Bachelor of Mechanical Engineering	B.E. (Mech)	6 years

The former programs.

Graduate program	Degree	year
Bachelor of Civil Engineering	B.E. (Civil)	7 years
Bachelor of Electronic and Communication Engineering	B.E. (EC)	7 years
Bachelor of Electrical Power Engineering	B.E. (EP)	7 years
Bachelor of Mechanical Engineering	B.E. (Mech)	7 years

Undergraduate diploma program	Degree	year
Diploma in Civil Engineering	A.G.T.I. (Civil)	3 years
Diploma in Electronic and Communication Engineering	A.G.T.I. (EC)	3 years
Diploma in Electrical Power Engineering	A.G.T.I. (EP)	3 years
Diploma in Mechanical Engineering	A.G.T.I. (Mech)	3 years

MiddleGraduate Diploma Program	Degree	year
Bachelor of Civil technology	B-tech (Civil)	5 years
Bachelor of Electronic and Communication technology	B-tech (EC)	5 years
Bachelor of Electrical power technology	B-tech (EP)	5 years
Bachelor of mechanical power technology	B-tech (Mech)	5 years

== Gallery ==
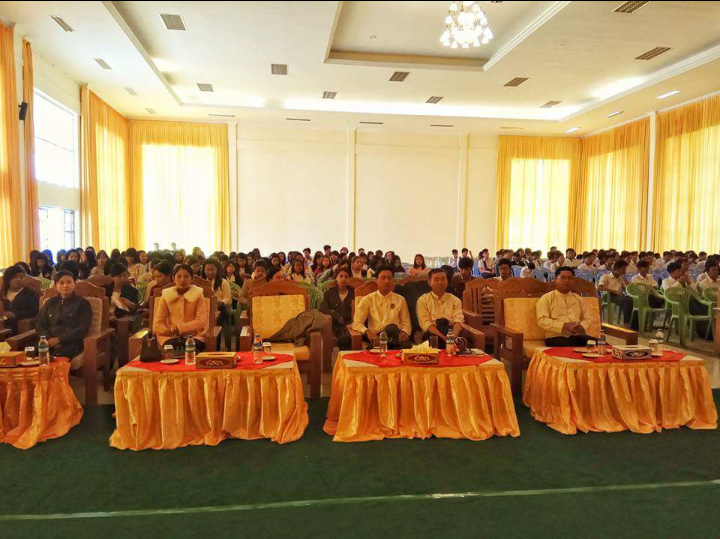
Celebration of the birthday of General Aung San

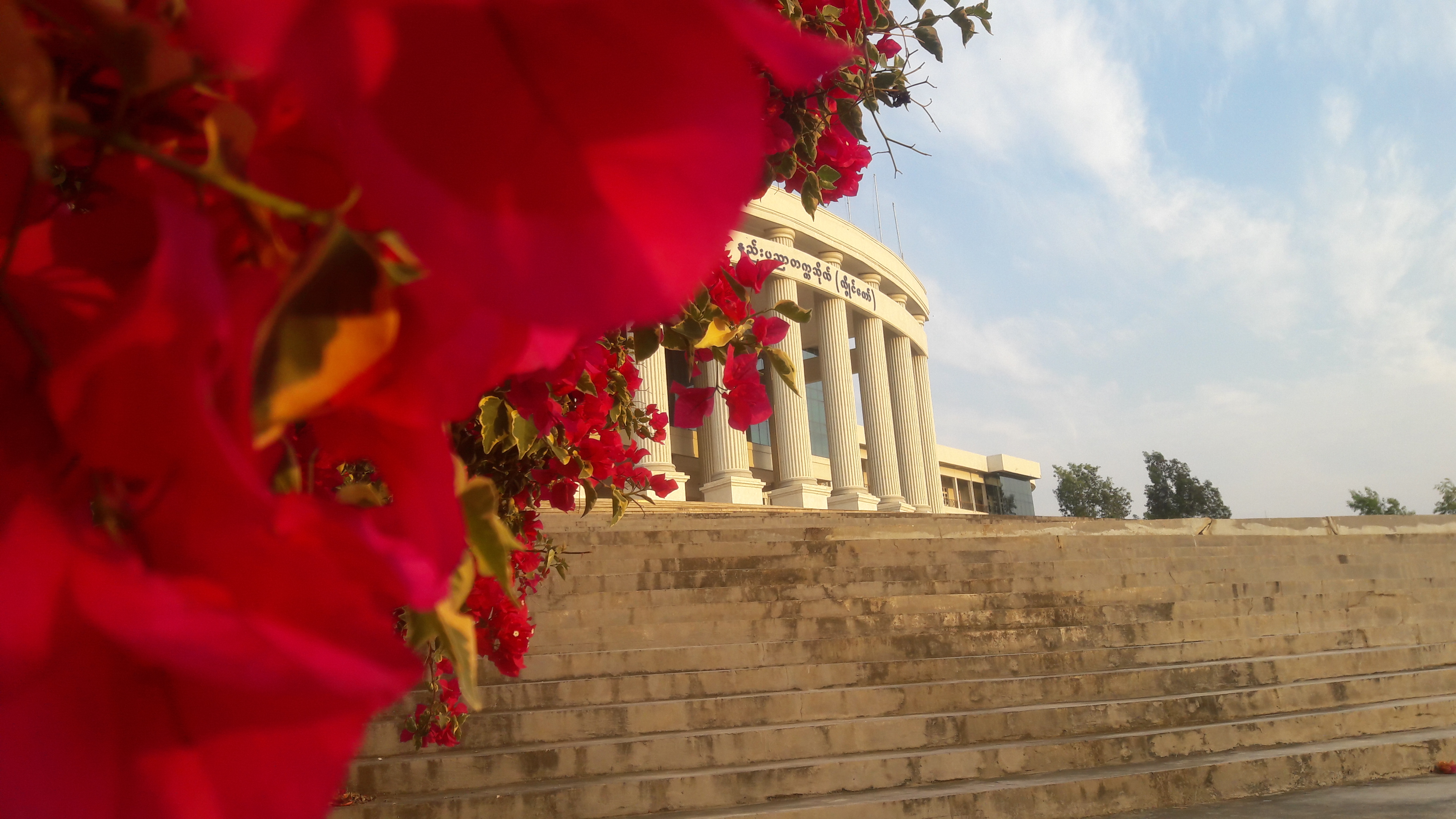
Main Building

The great view of raining from TU Loikaw.

== See also ==
- List of universities in Myanmar
- List of Technological Universities in Myanmar
