= Ministry of Science and Technology (Myanmar) =

Government ministry of Myanmar

- သိပ္ပံနှင့်နည်းပညာဝန်ကြီးဌာန

Ministry overview
- Formed: 2 October 1996; 17 June 2021
- Dissolved: 30 March 2016 (1st time)
- Type: Ministry
- Jurisdiction: Government of Myanmar
- Headquarters: Naypyidaw
- Minister responsible: Dr Myo Thein Kyaw
- Website: www.most.gov.mm

The Ministry of Science and Technology (Burmese: သိပ္ပံနှင့်နည်းပညာဝန်ကြီးဌာန; abbreviated MOST) is a government ministry of Myanmar that administers Myanmar's science and technology research and development affairs. MOST was established on 2 October 1996 under Order No. 30/96. The ministry was dissolved in 2016 by President Htin Kyaw and formed again in 2021 by SAC Chairman Min Aung Hlaing.

== Dissolved ==
The Ministry of Science and Technology was organized under the Ministry of Education as Ministry of Education (Science and Technology) in April 2016 by the Government of Myanmar, led by Htin Kyaw. There are 57 Universities, Colleges and Technical Institutes under the MOE-ST.

On 17 June 2021, the State Administration Council reformed the Ministry of Education as the Ministry of Education and the Ministry of Science and Technology.

== See also ==
- Cabinet of Myanmar
- List of Technological Universities in Myanmar
