= Yangon Technological University =

Higher education institute in Kachin State, Myanmar

- ရန်ကုန်နည်းပညာတက္ကသိုလ်
- Motto: စက်မှုတတ်မျိုး ပြည့်အကျိုး
- Type: public
- Established: 1924; 102 years ago
- Affiliations: GMSARN
- Rector: Dr. Theingi Ph.D (NTU, Singapore)
- Administrative staff: 89 (2007)
- Students: 2,500
- Undergraduates: Around 2,000
- Postgraduates: 329 (2007)
- Location: Insein 11101, Yangon; Yangon Region, Myanmar; 16°52′32.94″N 96°7′1.82″E
- Website: ytu.edu.mm
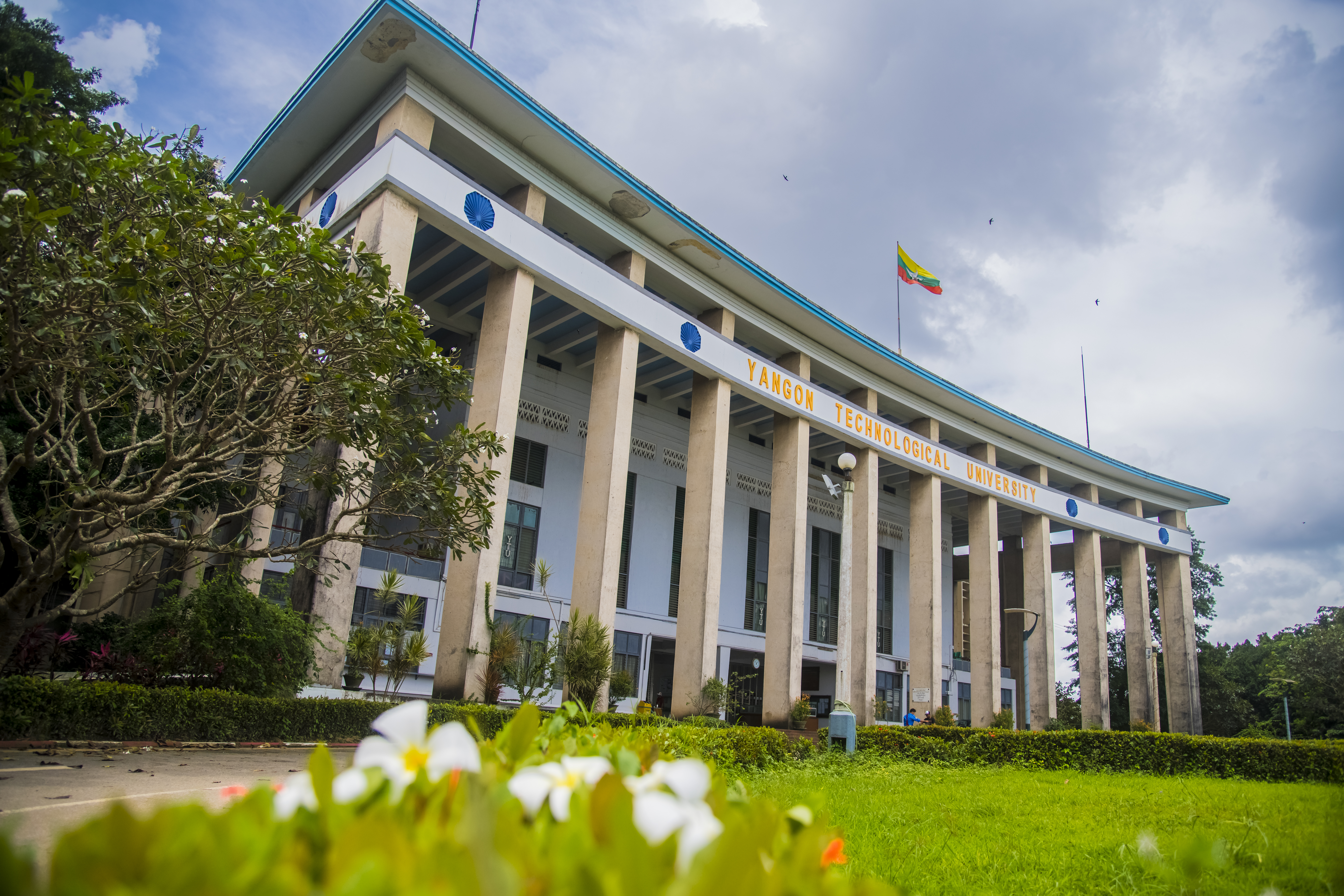

Yangon Technological University (YTU) (Burmese: ရန်ကုန်နည်းပညာတက္ကသိုလ် [jàɰ̃ɡòʊɰ̃ nípjɪ̀ɰ̃ɲà tɛʔkəθò]) is the premier engineering university of Myanmar. It is located in Insein, Yangon. Established as Department of Engineering under Rangoon University in 1924, and popularly known by its former name Rangoon Institute of Technology (RIT), YTU is the country's oldest and largest engineering university, and the best engineering university in Myanmar. The public university offers bachelor's, master's and doctorate degree programs in engineering disciplines to nearly 8000 students.

YTU is also a member of Southeast Asia Engineering Education Development Network (AUN/SEED-Net), and Greater Mekong Sub-region Academic and Research Network (GMSARN).

== History ==
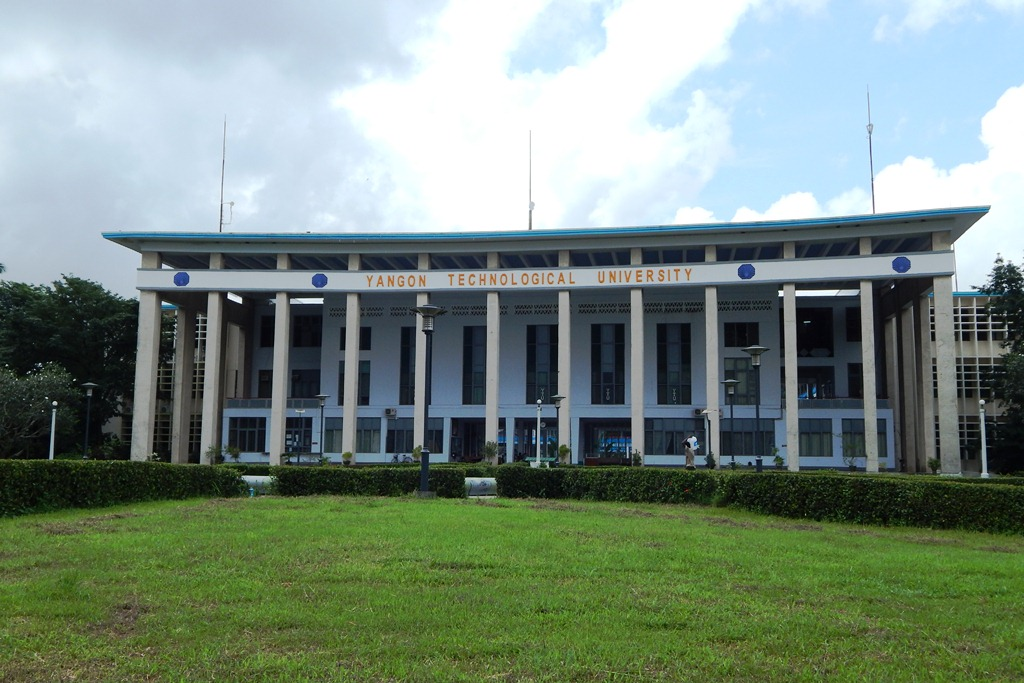
Yangon Technological University

The university traces its origins to Rangoon University's Department of Engineering established in 1924 during the British colonial period. In the beginning, the department was located in the extended compound of Rangoon General Hospital in downtown Yangon and consisted of two lecturers and 17 students. In 1927, it became a separate entity, BOC College of Engineering and Mining, named after Burmah Oil Company, and was moved four miles north. Civil Engineering was the only program offered until 1938 when a combined Mechanical and Electrical Engineering program was added.

After World War II, in 1946, the college became the Faculty of Engineering of Rangoon University. After Burma's independence in 1948, the college added Mining, Chemical, Metallurgy and Architecture programs in 1954 and a Textile Engineering program in 1955.

In 1961, the college became Burma Institute of Technology (BIT) of Rangoon University and was moved to the current building complex in Gyogone built by the Soviet Union. In 1964, BIT was renamed Rangoon Institute of Technology (RIT) and, more importantly, made an independent university under the Ministry of Education. RIT began conferring Bachelor of Engineering and Master of Engineering degrees instead of Bachelor of Science (Engineering) and Master Science (Engineering) degrees, hitherto offered at Rangoon University. The university expanded its bachelor's and master's degree offerings to the current 11 disciplines over the years. The PhD programs were added only in 1997.

The university was renamed Yangon Institute of Technology (YIT) in 1990 and was placed under the Ministry of Science and Technology in 1997. In 1998, the name of the university was changed to Yangon Technological University (YTU). In 1999, a new campus located six miles west of Gyogone in Hlaingtharya was opened. Until 1991, when Mandalay Institute of Technology was founded, the university was the only senior engineering university in the country, along with several Government Technical Institutes (GTIs), which offered two-year engineering diplomas. In 2012, both Yangon Technological University (YTU) and Mandalay Technological University (MTU) started to accept the best and most outstanding students around the country to undergraduate programs and they are called as Center of Excellence (COE).

== Programs ==
YTU maintains 18 academic departments: Civil Engineering, Mechanical Engineering, Electrical Power Engineering, Electronic Engineering, Telecommunications engineering (by Electronic Engineering department), Computer Engineering and Information Technology, Mechatronic Engineering, Chemical Engineering, Textile Engineering, Food engineering (by Chemical engineering department), Mining Engineering, Petroleum Engineering, Materials Science and Metallurgy Engineering, Biotechnology, Architecture, Engineering Geology, Engineering Physics, Engineering Chemistry, Engineering Mathematics, and Languages.

Most YTU students are enrolled full-time in engineering programs although over 2000 students are also enrolled in part-time programs. Of the nearly 11,000 students who graduated between 1997 and 2004, a little over 50% received bachelor's degrees, 10% master's, 4.5% postgraduate diploma, 32.5% undergraduate diploma, and 2.4% Ph.D.

=== Engineering ===
The university offers six-year B.E. and B.Arch. programs and two-year M.E. and M.Arch. programs. The Ph.D. programs last between three and five years. Students are accepted to YTU's undergraduate programs based on their scores from the annual university entrance examinations.

Program	Bachelor's	Master's	Doctoral
Architecture	B.Arch.	M.Arch.	Ph.D.
Civil Engineering	B.E.	M.E.	Ph.D.
Chemical Engineering	B.E.	M.E.	Ph.D.
Electrical Engineering	B.E.	M.E.	Ph.D.
Electronic Engineering	B.E.	M.E.	Ph.D.
Telecommunications Engineering	B.E.	M.E.	Ph.D.
Computer Engineering and Information Technology	B.E.	M.E.	Ph.D.
Mechanical Engineering	B.E.	M.E.	Ph.D.
Mechatronic Engineering	B.E.	M.E.	Ph.D.
Metallurgical Engineering and Materials Science	B.E.	M.E.	Ph.D.
Mining	B.E.	M.E.	Ph.D.
Petroleum Engineering	B.E.	M.E.	Ph.D.
Textile Engineering	B.E.	M.E.	Ph.D.
Food Engineering	B.E.	M.E.	Ph.D.

=== Postgraduate studies ===
The following one-year postgraduate diploma, two-year master's and doctoral programs are offered in applied sciences. The university had 322 postgraduate students in the 2007–2008 academic year.

Program	Post-Grad Diploma	Master's	Doctoral
Aqua Technology	Yes	Yes	No
Biotechnology	Yes	Yes	Yes
Business and Technology Management	Yes	Yes	No
Engineering Chemistry	No	Yes	Yes
Engineering Geology	Yes	Yes	Yes
Engineering Mathematics	No	Yes	Yes
Engineering Physics (Electronics)	No	Yes	Yes
English	Yes	Yes	No
Environmental Engineering	Yes	Yes	No
Environmental Planning and Management	Yes	Yes	No
Food Technology	Yes	Yes	No
Nuclear Technology	Yes	Yes	Yes
Settlement Planning and Design	Yes	Yes	No

=== Undergraduate diplomas ===
The university offers one-year Diploma in Technology degrees in the following:

- Architectural Design and Planning
- Civil
- Chemical
- Food Technology
- Electrical Power
- Electronics Technology
- Computer Engineering and Information Technology
- Mechanical
- Metallurgical
- Mineral
- Mining
- Petroleum
- Telecommunication
- Textile

== Campus ==
The university consists of the main campus in Gyogone and a smaller campus in Hlaingthaya Township, six miles west.

The main campus, built between 1958 and 1961 with aid from the Soviet Union, comprises eight main buildings, all interlinked by rain-proof corridors. The main hall and administrative departments are in Building 1. Buildings 5-8 house the School of Architecture and laboratory rooms. The library is near Building 1. The campus also includes a Recreational Centre, a football pitch, a canteen with many restaurants, and a carpark. Faculty residences are located in the back of the campus. Seven halls (named Block A through Block G) are accepted again as dormitory halls in December 2013.

== Faculty and alumni ==
=== List of rectors ===
Rector name	Duration	Notes
Prof. Ba Hli	1950–1958	
Prof. Yone Mo	1962–1971	
Prof. Aung Gyi	1971–1977	Former Head of Civil Engineering
Prof. Khin Aung Kyi	1977–1988	Former Head of Chemical Engineering
Prof. Maung Maung Than	1988–1992	Former Head of Textile Engineering
Prof. Aung Than	1992–1993	
Prof. Kyin Soe	1993–1997	MSc. Mechanical Engineering & Former Head of Mechanical Engineering
Prof. Nyi Hla Nge	1997–2000	Former Head of Civil Engineering
Dr. Pe Win	2000–2003	Former Head of Metallurgical Engineering and Materials Science
Dr. Hla Than	2003–2005	
Dr. Mya Mya Oo	2005–2006	
Dr. Khin Maung Aye	2006–2008	Moved from University of Yangon, then moved to West Yangon Technological University, and Technological University, Hmawbi on 13 August 2010
Dr. Mya Mya Oo	2008–2012	
Dr. Aye Myint	2012–2016	Moved from Technological University, Thanlyin to West Yangon Technological University
Dr. Myint Thein	2016–present	

=== Alumni ===
As YTU was the only senior university in the country until 1991, most senior engineers in Burma hail from RIT/YTU. However, many alumni and former faculty members have left the country for work, further studies, or both. The largest group of overseas alumni are believed to be in Singapore.

=== Students ===
==== Number of enrolled students ====
Program	Quantity
Ph.D. students in all engineering disciplines	150
Number of Ph.D. students in all applied sciences	62
M.E./MESP/DESP students	93
Total	213

==== Number of graduated students ====
Under Ministry of Education (from 1927 to 1996)

Program	Quantity
B.E. students in all engineering disciplines	15007
M.E students in all engineering disciplines	60
M.Phil. students in all engineering disciplines	27
Postgraduate diploma students	292
Total	17346

Under Ministry of Science and Technology (from 1997 to present)

Program	Quantity
B.E. students in all engineering disciplines	4592
B.S. (Biotechnology) students	238
M.E. students in all engineering disciplines	1485
M.Phil. students in all engineering disciplines	16
M.S. (Applied Science)/MESP students	664
Postgraduate diploma students	839
Part-time students (diploma in Technology)	3541
Ph.D. students in all engineering disciplines	168
Ph.D. students in all applied sciences	251
Total	11794

== International affiliations ==
YTU is a member of Southeast Asia Engineering Education Development Network (AUN/SEED-Net), and Greater Mekong Sub-region Academic and Research Network (GMSARN). The university has academic affiliations with University of Karlsruhe (Germany), Shibaura Institute of Technology (Japan), Asian Institute of Technology (Thailand) and Mae Fah Luang University (Thailand).

== Repression by the Junta Regime ==
The bloody events that occurred in the university campus in March 1988 set the stage for the famous 8888 uprising of Myanmar which set the country's political course over the next three decades. Ko Phone Maw, a fifth-year chemical engineering student from the Rangoon Institute of Technology, in the campus was shot dead in the campus by the Riot Police during a protest regarding a brawl with youths from west Gyogone ward.Five other students were injured. One of the injured students, Ko Soe Naing, a fifth-year mining engineering student, later died on the hospital.

Protests after the deaths of Ko Phone Maw and other students escalated and on March 15, 1988, the military raided the university and arrested hundreds of students. University was closed and students were forced back to return their homes.

On March 17, 1988, students from the Rangoon University protested against the Rangoon Institute of Technology raid were brutally dispersed at Tada Phyu, Pyay Road, Yangon. Dozens of students were killed and injured and hundreds of students were detained.

Subsequent protests after brutal crackdowns escalated into a national uprising against the Socialist government that resulted in the resignation of the dictator Ne Win in July 1988.

== See also ==
- Mandalay Technological University
- Technological University (Hmawbi)
- Technological University, Thanlyin
- West Yangon Technological University
- List of Technological Universities in Myanmar
