= Mandalay Technological University =

Technological university in Myanmar

Coordinates: 21°58′21″N 96°11′10″E

- မန္တလေး နည်းပညာ တက္ကသိုလ်
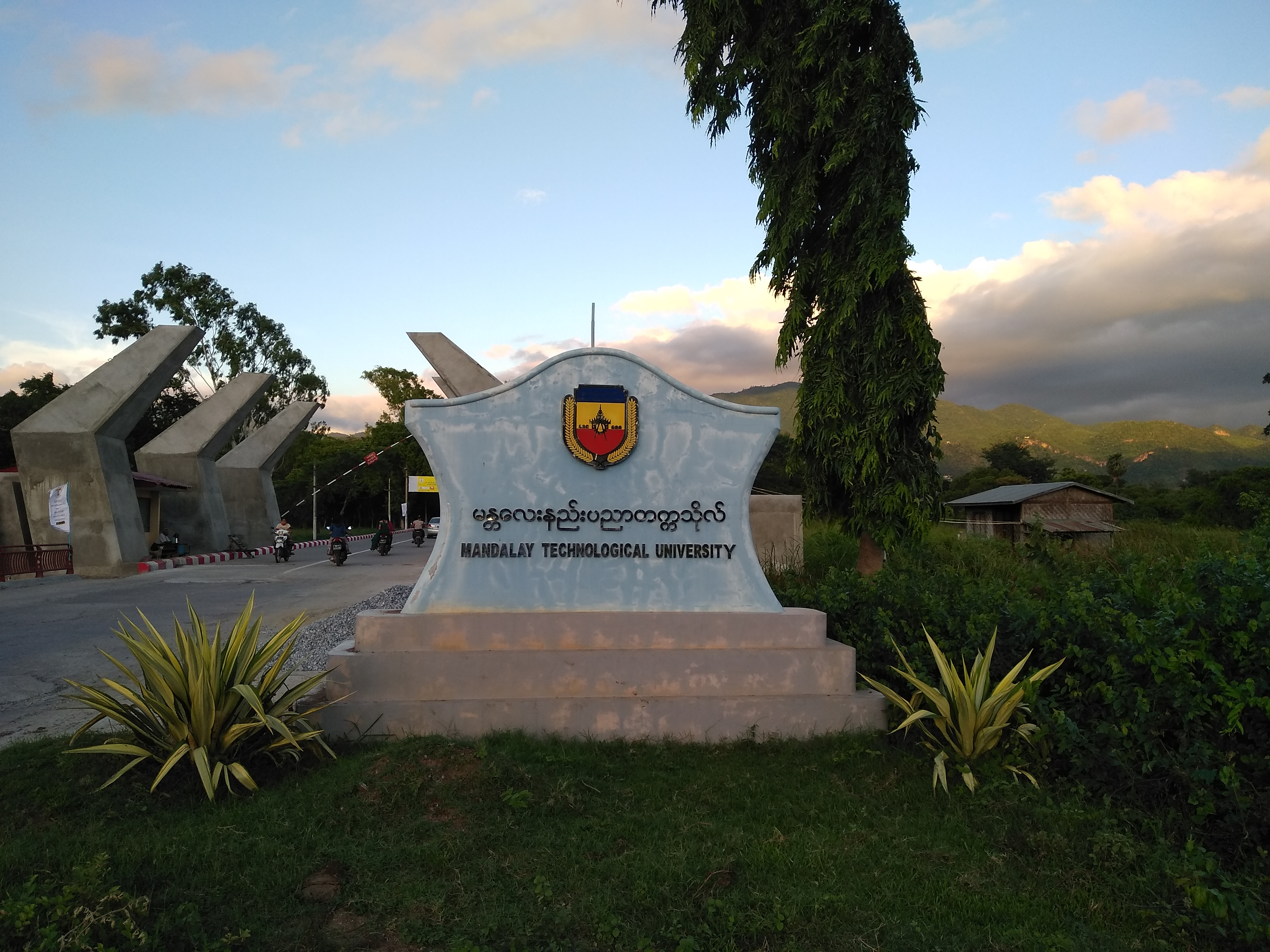
- Motto: Integrated Learning to Knowledge, Skills And Attitudes. (ဘက်စုံသင်ယူနိုင်မှုမှသည် အသိဥာဏ် ကြွယ်ဝမှုနှင့် ကျွမ်းကျင်မှုဆီသို့)
- Type: Public
- Established: 1 October 1991; 34 years ago
- Affiliations: MOE-ST
- Rector: Ei Ei Htwe
- Administrative staff: more than 500
- Students: 2600 (2020)
- Undergraduates: 1800
- Postgraduates: 800
- Location: Patheingyi, Mandalay, Myanmar
- Website: mtu.edu.mm//

Mandalay Technological University (MTU) (Burmese: မန္တလေး နည်းပညာ တက္ကသိုလ်, pronounced [máɰ̃dəlé nípjɪ̀ɰ̃ɲà tɛʔkəθò], formerly, the Mandalay Institute of Technology - MIT), in Patheingyi, Mandalay, is a prestigious engineering university in Myanmar. The university offers undergraduate, and postgraduate programmes in engineering disciplines to students and is one of the most selective universities in the country, admitting only 300-350 undergrad students annually based on their University Entrance Examination scores.

Since MTU offers master's, doctoral and other postgraduate diploma offering programmes, it takes around 200-300 postgrads every academic year.

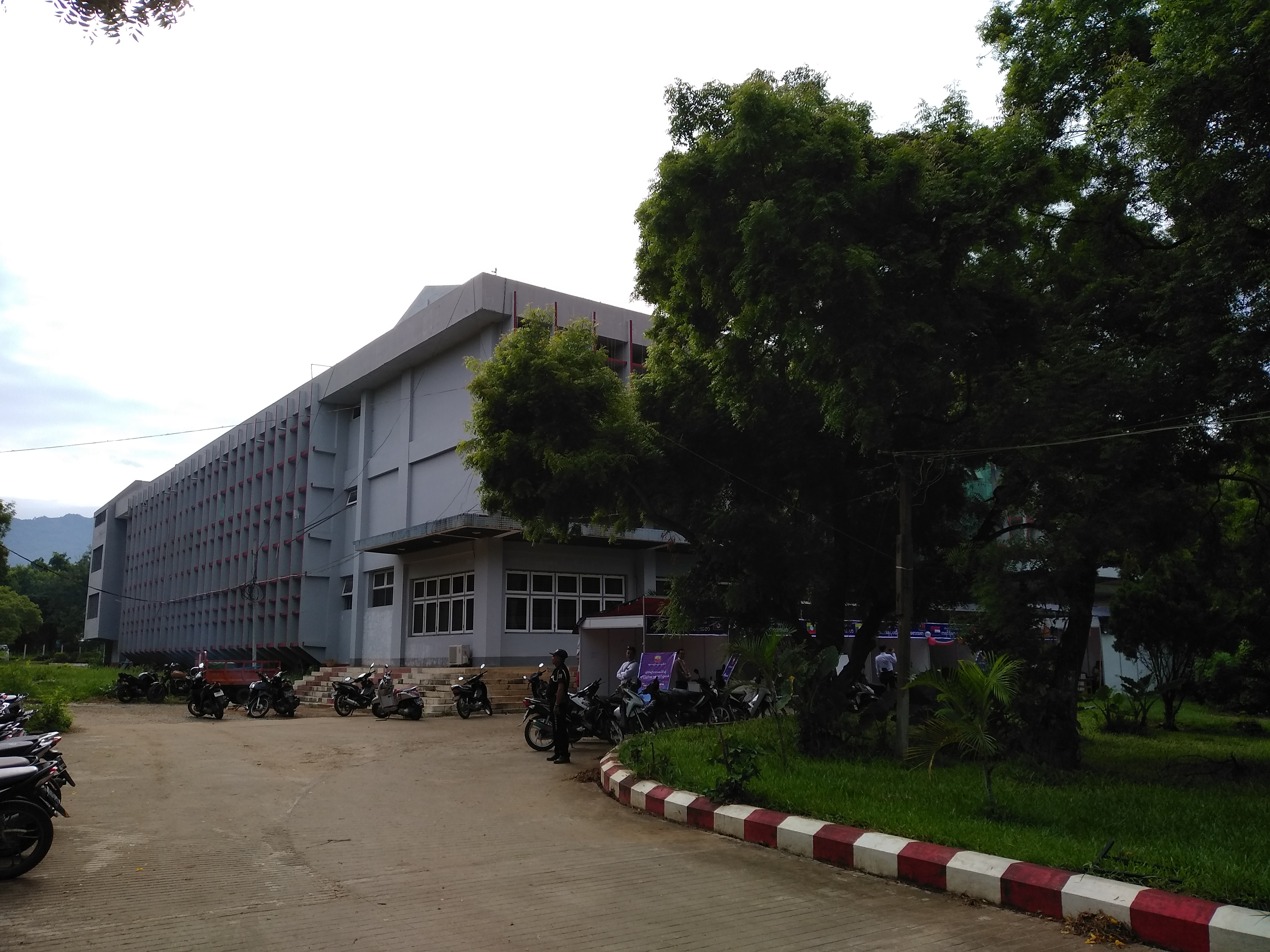
Main Building

== History ==
The university was founded as Mandalay Institute of Technology (MIT) on October 1, 1991 and became the 2nd university of engineering and technology to be founded in Myanmar after Yangon Institute of Technology (now Yangon Technological University). In 2012, Mandalay Institute of Technology (MIT) was renamed Mandalay Technological University (MTU).

In March 2012, the Centers of Excellence (COE) project, that selected the best technological universities in the country to upgrade and meet the international standard in engineering education, was initiated by the Ministry of Science and Technology. Mandalay Technological University (MTU) for the students who passed from the Upper Myanmar exam centers and Yangon Technological University (YTU) for the students who passed matriculation exam from Lower Myanmar exam centers were designated as COEs. Since then, Mandalay Technological University (MTU) has started to accept the best and most outstanding students around the country to undergraduate programs and they are called as Center of Excellence (COE) students. Only top 1.2% scorers in the annual University Entrance Examination are accepted to MTU, and thus MTU remains the best university which students need best scores among all the students around Myanmar to get acceptance.

== University Presidents ==
No.	Name	Responsibility	Duration
1	Khin Maung	Temporary Principal	From 1-10-1991 to 25-12-1991 (2 months and 25 days)
2	Thein Tan	Rector	From 26-12-1991 to 31-8-2000 (8 Years, 8 months and 6 days)
3	Kyaw San	Pro-Rector	From 1-9-2000 to 22-2-2002 (1 Year, 5 months and 22 days)
4	Aung Kyaw Myat	Rector	From 23-2-2002 to 18-8-2006 (4 Years, 5 months and 24 days)
5	Kay Thi Lwin	Pro-Rector	From 19-8-2006 to 9-7-2008 (1 Year, 10 months and 21 days)
6	Zaw Min Aung	Pro-Rector	From 10-7-2008 to 24-3-2009 (8 months and 15 days)
7	Mya Mya Oo	Rector	From 25-3-2009 to 28-4-2013 (4 Years, 1 month and 4 days)
8	Myint Thein	Rector	from 29-4-2013 to 22-9-2016
9	Myo Nyunt	Pro-Rector	from 23-9-2016 to 26-4-2017
10	Sint Soe	Rector	from 26-4-2017 to 16-9-2019
11	Ei Ei Htwe	Rector (Temporarily Acting)	Acting as a rector serving from 17-9-2019 until now

== Programmes ==
The university's main offerings are six-year bachelor's and two-year master's degree programmes. Two-thirds of nearly 7500 students who graduated between 1997 and 2004 received bachelor's degrees and 7.3% received master's.

=== Engineering ===
Program	Bachelor's	Master's	Doctoral
Architecture	B.Arch	M.Arch.	Ph.D.
Petroleum Engineering	B.E.	-	-
Chemical Engineering	B.E.	M.E.	Ph.D.
Civil Engineering	B.E.	M.E.	Ph.D.
Electrical Power Engineering	B.E.	M.E.	Ph.D.
Electronics Engineering	B.E.	M.E.	Ph.D.
Computer Engineering and Information Technology	B.E.	M.E.	Ph.D.
Mechanical Engineering	B.E.	M.E.	Ph.D.
Mechatronics Engineering	B.E.	M.E.	Ph.D.
Mining Engineering	B.E.	M.E.	Ph.D.
Biotechnology Engineering	B.S.	M.S.	Ph.D.

The following one-year postgraduate diploma, two-year master's and doctoral programmes were offered in applied sciences until 2010. Now these programmes are not available anymore.

Program	Post-Grad Diploma	Master's	Doctoral
Engineering Chemistry	Yes	Yes	Yes
Engineering Mathematics	Yes	Yes	Yes
Engineering Physics	Yes	Yes	Yes

=== Departments ===
The MTU is organized as follows:

- engineering departments,
- research departments,
- academic departments, and
- supporting departments.

==== Engineering departments ====
MTU's engineering departments are as follows:

- Department of Architecture
- Department of Biotechnology Engineering
- Department of Chemical Engineering
- Department of Petroleum Engineering
- Department of Civil Engineering
- Department of Electrical Power Engineering
- Department of Electronics Engineering
- Department of Energy Technology (NT)
- Department of Computer Engineering and Information Technology
- Department of Mechanical Engineering
- Department of Mechatronics Engineering
- Department of Metallurgy Engineering
- Department of Mining Engineering
- Department of Remote Sensing

==== Academic departments ====
The academic departments are:

- Department of Burmese
- Department of English
- Department of Engineering Chemistry
- Department of Engineering Mathematics
- Department of Engineering Physics
- Department of Engineering Geology
- Department of Workshop Technology

==== Research departments ====
The research departments are:

- Chemical Research Centre and
- Electrical & Communication and Electrical Power Research

==== Supporting departments ====
Supporting departments are:

- Administration
- Estate Engineering
- Finance
- Human Resources
- International Relations
- Quality Management
- Students' Affairs
- Workshop

=== Undergraduate diplomas ===
The university also offers one-year Diploma in Technology degrees in the following:

- Civil
- Electrical Power
- Electronics
- Mechanical

== See also ==
- Yangon Technological University
- Pyay Technological University
- List of Technological Universities in Myanmar
