= Computer University =

Computer University may refer to:

- Computer University, Hpa-An, Kayin State, Myanmar
- Computer University, Kalay, Sagaing Region, Myanmar
- Computer University, Loikaw, Kayah State, Myanmar
- Computer University, Magway, Magway Region, Myanmar
- Computer University, Mandalay, Mandalay Region, Myanmar
- University of Computer Studies (Maubin), Ayeyarwady Region, Myanmar
- Computer University, Mawlamyine, Mon State, Myanmar
- Computer University, Meiktila, Mandalay Region, Myanmar
- Computer University, Monywa, Sagaing Region, Myanmar
- Computer University, Myeik, Sagaing Region, Myanmar
- Computer University, Myitkyina, Kachin State, Myanmar
- Computer University, Pakokku, Magway Region, Myanmar
- Computer University, Pyay, Bago Region, Myanmar
- Computer University, Sittwe, Rakhine State, Myanmar
- University of Computer Studies (Taungoo), Bago Region, Myanmar
- Computer University, Thaton, Mon State, Myanmar
- University of Computer Studies, Yangon, Yangon Region, Myanmar
