= List of universities in Myanmar =

The following is a comprehensive list of universities in Myanmar, categorised by state and region. Nearly all major and national universities in Myanmar are in Yangon Region and Mandalay Region. The Burmese higher education system is entirely state-run, and its universities and colleges are organised along their fields of studies. The country's 150-plus universities and colleges are administered by various government ministries. For example, liberal arts and science universities such as Yangon University and Mandalay University, and technological universities are run by the Ministry of Education, the medical schools are run by the Ministry of Health, Private colleges offer international joint diploma to the residents in some fields such as engineering, computing, and Business administration.

== Ayeyarwady Region ==
- Javana Buddhist Academy Kyaiklat
- Bogalay Education College
- Computer University, Hinthada
- University of Computer Studies (Maubin)
- Computer University, Pathein
- Government Technical Institute, Wakema
- Hinthada University
- Maubin University
- Myanmar Union Adventist Seminary
- Myaungmya Education College
- Pathein Education College
- Pathein University
- Technological University, Hinthada
- Technological University, Maubin
- Technological University, Pathein
- State Agricultural Institute, Myaungmya

== Bago Region ==
- Bago University
- Computer University, Pyay
- Computer University, Taungoo
- Paku Divinity School
- Pyay Education Degree College
- Pyay Technological University
- Pyay University
- Taungoo Education Degree College
- Taungoo University
- Technological University, Taungoo
- Government technical institute Taungoo

== Chin State ==
- Chin Christian College
- Chin Christian Institute of Theology
- Hakha College
- Union Theological College Matupi

== Kachin State ==
- Bhamo University
- Computer University, Bhamo
- Computer University, Myitkyina
- Government Technical College, Mohnyin
- Kachin Theological College
- Mohnyin University
- Myitkyina Education College
- Myitkyina University
- Technological University, Bhamo
- Technological University, Myitkyina

== Kayah State ==
- Computer University, Loikaw
- Loikaw University
- Technological University, Loikaw
- Loikaw Education College

== Kayin State ==
- Computer University, Hpa-An
- Hpa-An Education College
- Hpa-An University
- Technological University, Hpa-An
- Government Technical Institute, Hpa-an
- Government Technical High School Hpa-an
- Agriculture Zwekabin
- Youth Vocational Training
- Education Gathering Group EGG Taung La Yat
- Youth Leaning Center
- Gateway Leaning Center
- PEDU Learning Center
- SUNSHINE LEARNING CENTER
- YURI INTERNATIONAL SCHOOL
- LINCOLN PRIVATE SCHOOL
- KAREN MEDICAL COLLEGE

== Magway Region ==
- University of Computer Studies (Magway)
- University of Computer Studies (Pakokku)
- Yenangyaung Government Technical Institute
- Magway Education College
- Magway University
- Pakokku Education Degree College
- Pakokku University
- Technological University, Magway
- Technological University, Pakokku
- University of Community Health, Magway
- University of Medicine, Magway
- Pali University of Buddhism, Pakokku
- Yenangyaung University
- Government Technical Institute, Chauk
- Government Technical Institute, Thayet
- Government Technical Institute, Magway
- Pakokku Nursing College

== Mandalay Region ==
- Computer University, Mandalay
- Computer University, Meiktila
- Government Technical Institute, Kyaukpadaung
- Government Technical Institute, Pyinoolwin
- Government Technical Institute, Yamethin
- Defence Services Academy
- Defence Services Technological Academy
- Kyaukse University
- London Business University
- Mandalay Education College
- University of Nursing, Mandalay
- Co-operative College, Mandalay
- Mandalay Technological University
- Mandalar Degree College
- Meiktila Education College
- Meiktila University of Economics
- Meiktila University
- Myanmar Aerospace Engineering University
- Myanmar Institute of Information Technology
- Theological University, Mandalay
- Myingyan Degree College
- Nationalities Youth Resource Development Degree College, Mandalay
- Phaung Daw Oo International University, Mandalay
- State Pariyatti Sasana University, Mandalay
- Technological University, Kyaukse
- Mandalay Technological University
- Technological University, Meiktila
- University of Computer Studies, Mandalay
- National University of Arts and Culture, Mandalay
- University of Dental Medicine, Mandalay
- University of Distance Education, Mandalay
- University of Foreign Languages, Mandalay
- University of Forestry, Yezin
- University of Mandalay
- University of Medical Technology, Mandalay
- University of Medicine, Mandalay
- University of Pharmacy, Mandalay
- University of Sattan Astoni (UoSA)
- University of Technology, Yadanabon Cyber City
- University of Traditional Medicine, Mandalay
- University of Veterinary Science, Yezin
- Yadanabon University
- Yezin Agricultural University
- Myanmar Commercial Management Institute
- Mandalay Business School
- Myanmar Commercial University

== Mon State ==
- Computer University, Thaton
- Thaton Institute of Agriculture
- Mawlamyine Education Degree College
- Mawlamyine Institute of Education
- Mawlamyine University
- Technological University (Mawlamyine)
- Government Technical Institute (Mawlamyine)

== Rakhine State ==
- Arakan National University
- Computer University, Sittwe
- Sittway University
- Technological University, Sittwe
- Technological University, Kyaukpyu
- Kyaukphyu Education Degree College
- Nursing and midwifery training school, Kyaukpyu
- Taungup University
- Government Technical Institute, Thandwe

== Sagaing Region ==
- Computer University, Kalay
- Computer University, Monywa
- Technological University, Sagaing
- Sitagu World Buddhist University, Sagaing
- Government Technical College, Shwebo
- McNeilus Maranatha Christian College, Kalay
- Monywa Education College
- Monywa Institute of Economics
- Monywa University
- Sagaing University of Education
- University of Co-operative and Management, Sagaing
- Shwebo University
- Technological University, Monywa
- University for the Development of the National Races of the Union
- University of Kalay
- Technological University (Kalay)
- Nationalities Youth Resource Development Degree College, Sagaing
- Sagaing University
- Sagaing University of Education

== Shan State ==
- Computer University, Lashio
- Computer University, Kyaingtong
- Computer University, Panglong
- Computer University, Taunggyi
- Kyaingtong University
- Lashio University
- Lashio Education College
- Panglong University
- Taunggyi Education College
- Taunggyi University
- Technological University, Kyaingtong
- Technological University, Lashio
- Technological University, Panglong
- Technological University, Taunggyi
- University of Medicine, Taunggyi
- University of Computer Studies, Taunggyi
- Shan State Buddhist University, Taunggyi
- Sariputta College, Muse

== Tanintharyi Region ==
- Computer University, Dawei
- Computer University, Myeik
- Dawei Education College
- Dawei University
- Myeik University
- Polytechnic University, Myeik
- Polytechnic University (Dawei)

== Yangon Region ==
- Academy of Management and Technology (AMT)
- Auston University Myanmar
- Co-operative College, Phaunggyi
- University of Co-operative and Management, Thanlyin
- City University, Yangon
- Dagon University
- Defence Services Institute of Nursing and Paramedical Science
- Defence Services Medical Academy
- Hlegu Education College
- British University College
- Info Myanmar University
- International Theravada Buddhist Missionary University
- Karen Baptist Theological Seminary
- Lorrain Theological College
- Myanmar Institute of Theology
- Myanmar Imperial University
- Myanmar Maritime University
- National Management University of Myanmar
- Nationalities Youth Resource Development Degree College, Yangon
- State Pariyatti Sasana University, Yangon
- Strategy First University
- STI Myanmar University
- Technological University, Hmawbi
- Technological University, Thanlyin
- Thingangyun Education College
- University of Computer Studies, Yangon
- University of Culture, Yangon
- University of Dental Medicine, Yangon
- University of Distance Education, Yangon
- University of East Yangon
- University of Foreign Languages, Yangon
- University of Information Technology, Yangon
- University of Medical Technology, Yangon
- University of Medicine 1, Yangon
- University of Medicine 2, Yangon
- University of Paramedical Science, Yangon
- University of Pharmacy, Yangon
- University of Public Health, Yangon
- University of West Yangon
- Victoria University College
- Vivekananda American University (VAU), Yangon
- West Yangon Technological University
- Yangon Institute of Economics
- Yangon Institute of Education
- Yangon Institute of Marine Technology
- Yangon Institute of Nursing
- Yangon Technological University
- Yangon University
- Yankin Education College
- Yangon University of Education
- Government Technical College,South Dragon
- Government Technical institute,Insein
- Government Technical institute , Thanlyin
- Government Technical institute, Shwepyithar
- Myanmar Commercial University - MCU
- ATBC - International College
- ATBC - Ayeyarwady Technology & Business College
- IQY Technical College
- IQY Technical University

== Gallery ==
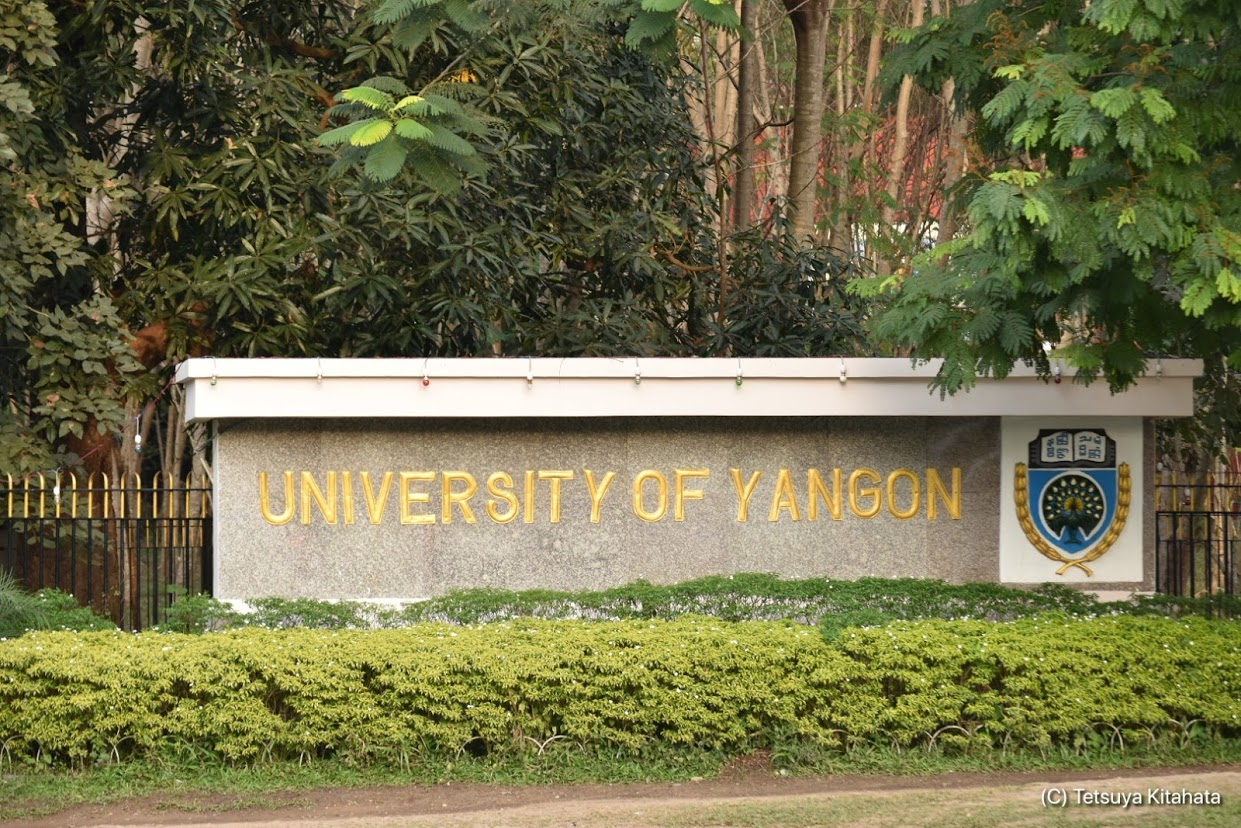
University of Yangon

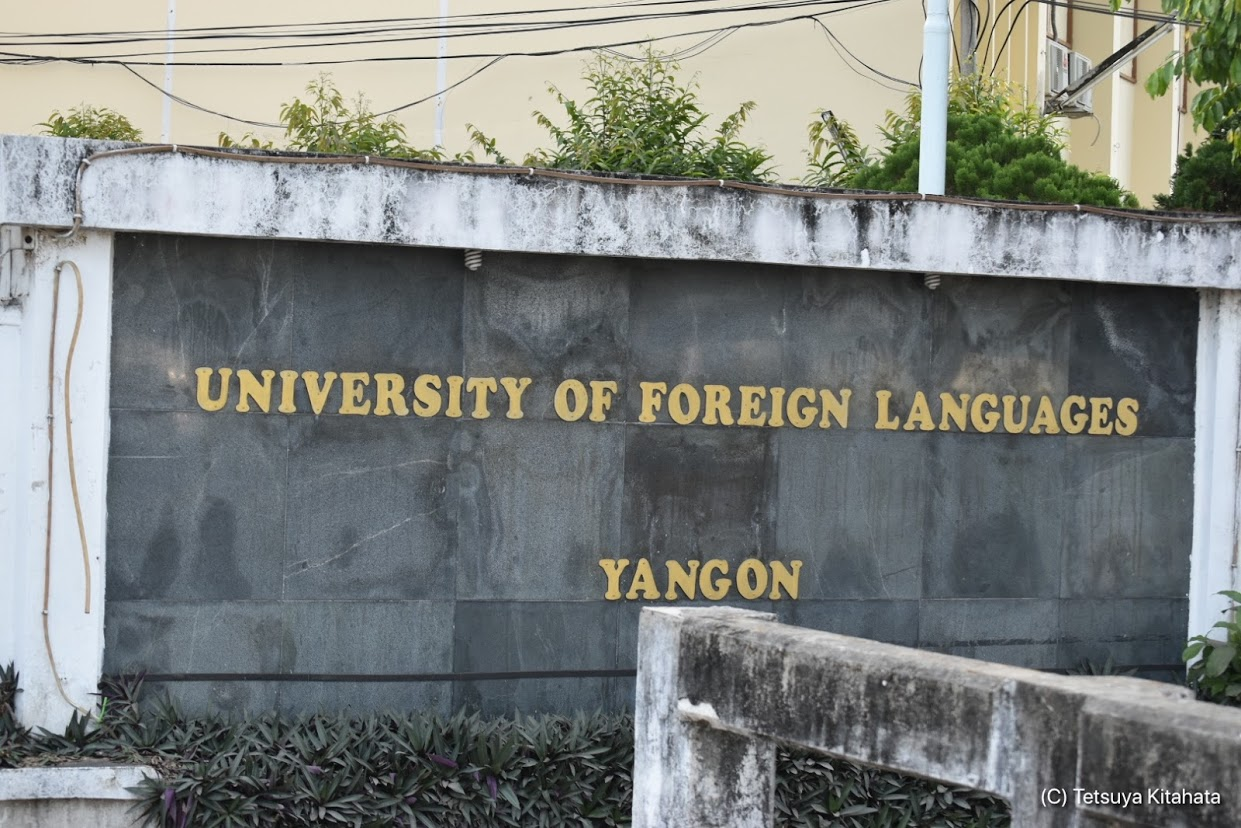
University of Foreign Languages Yangon

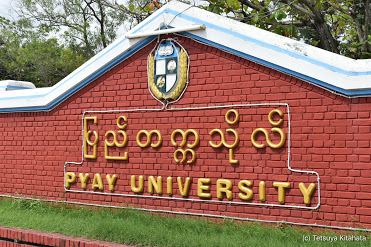
Pyay University

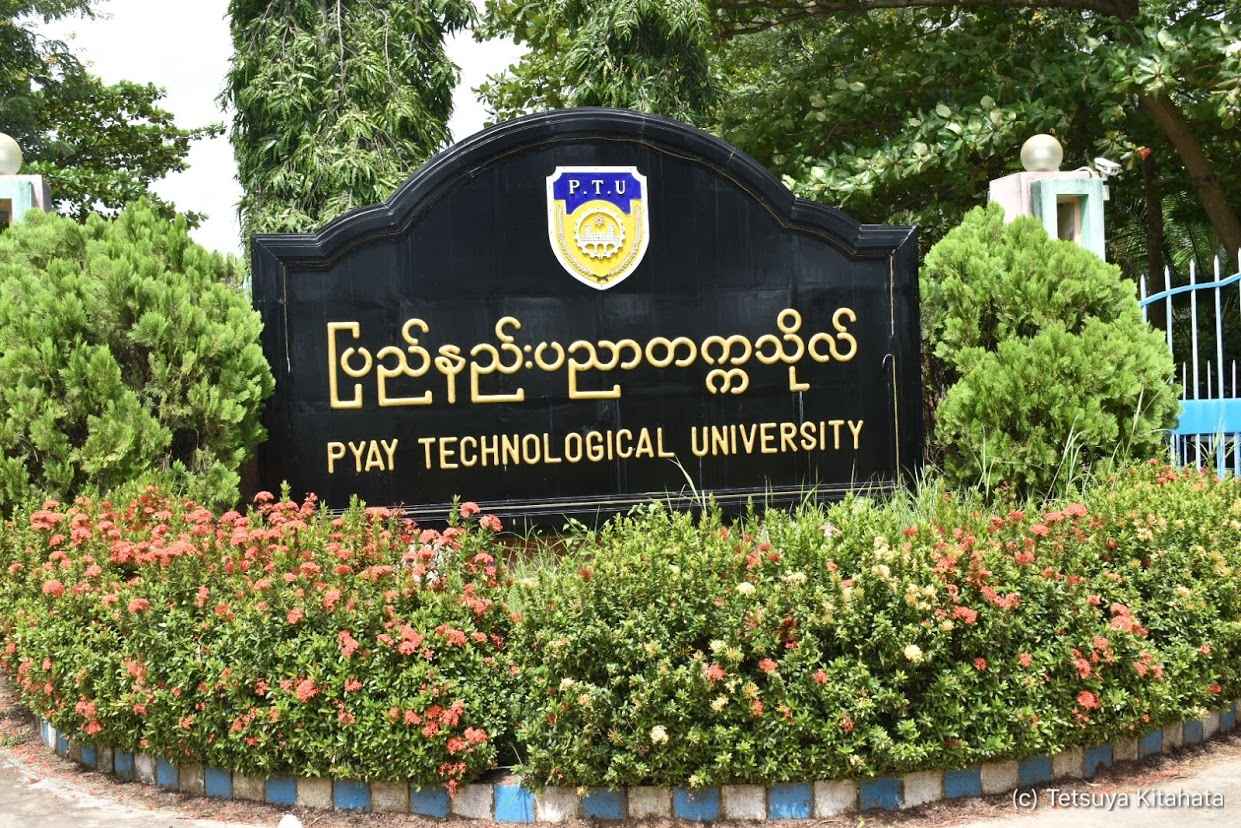
Pyay Technological University

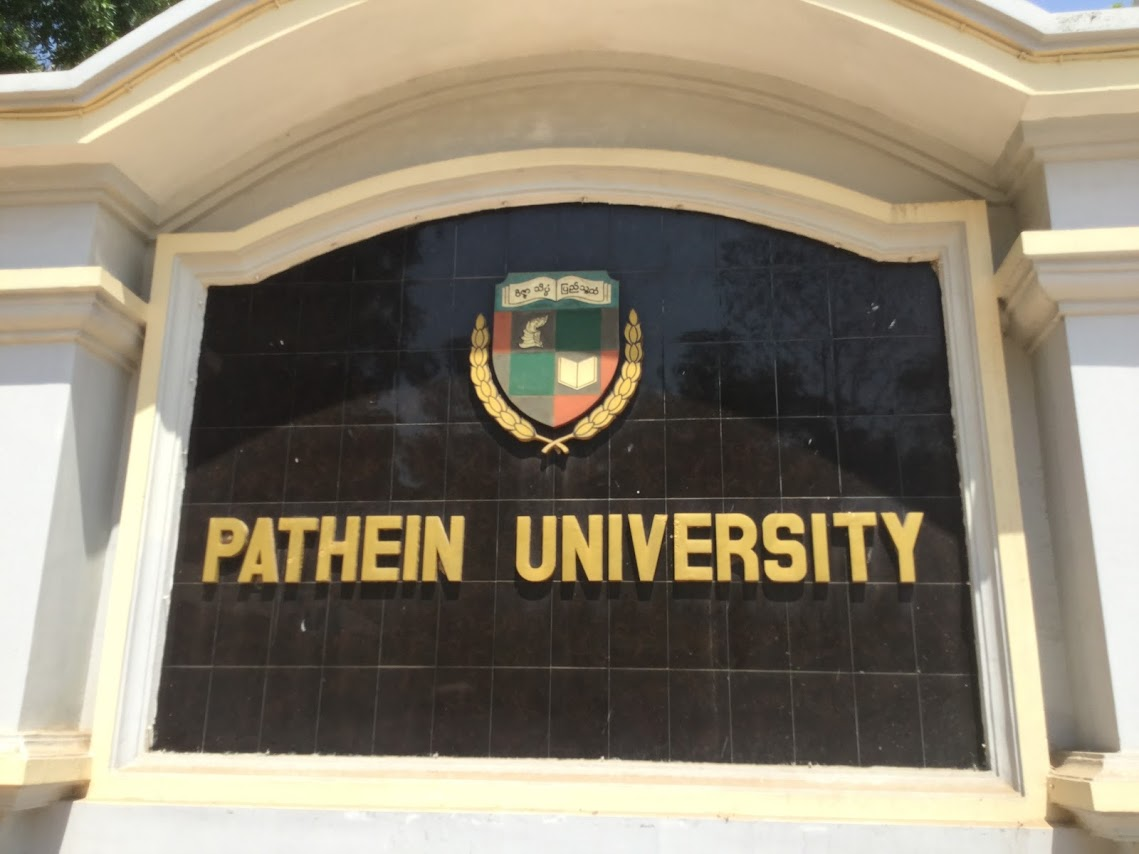
Pathein University

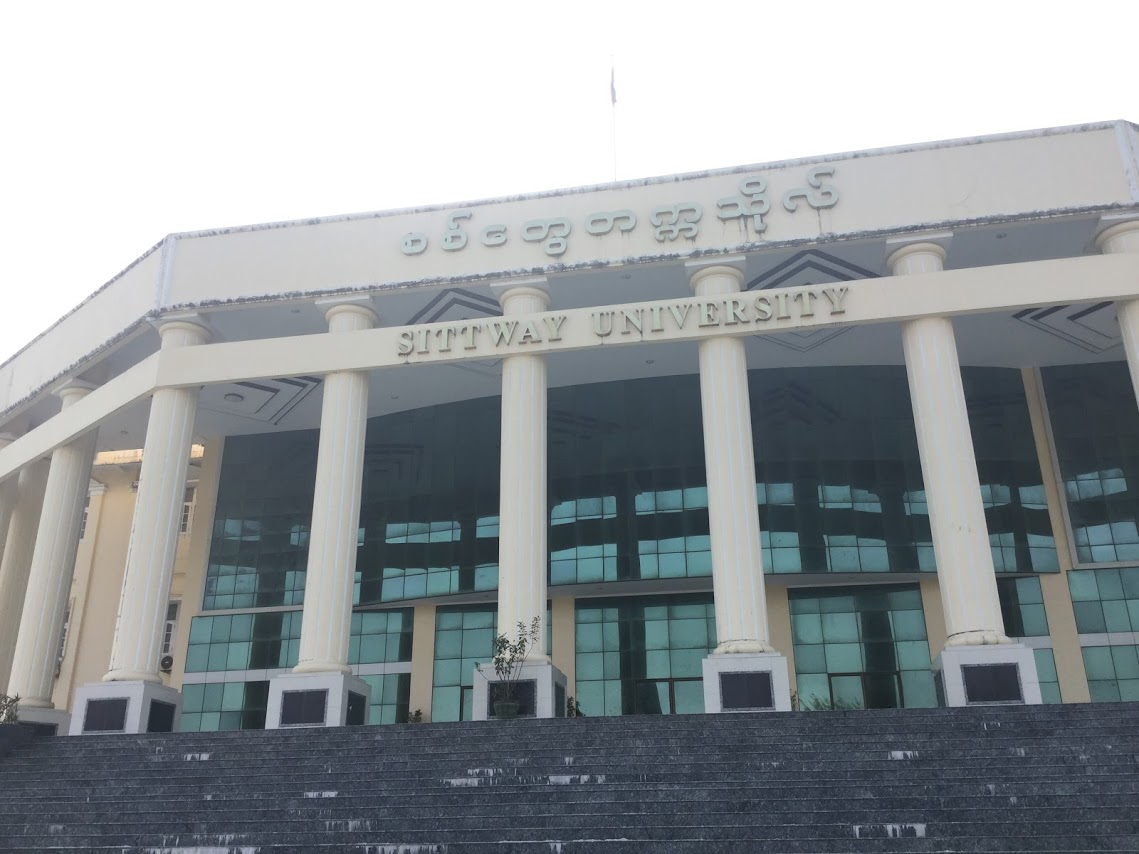
Sittwe University

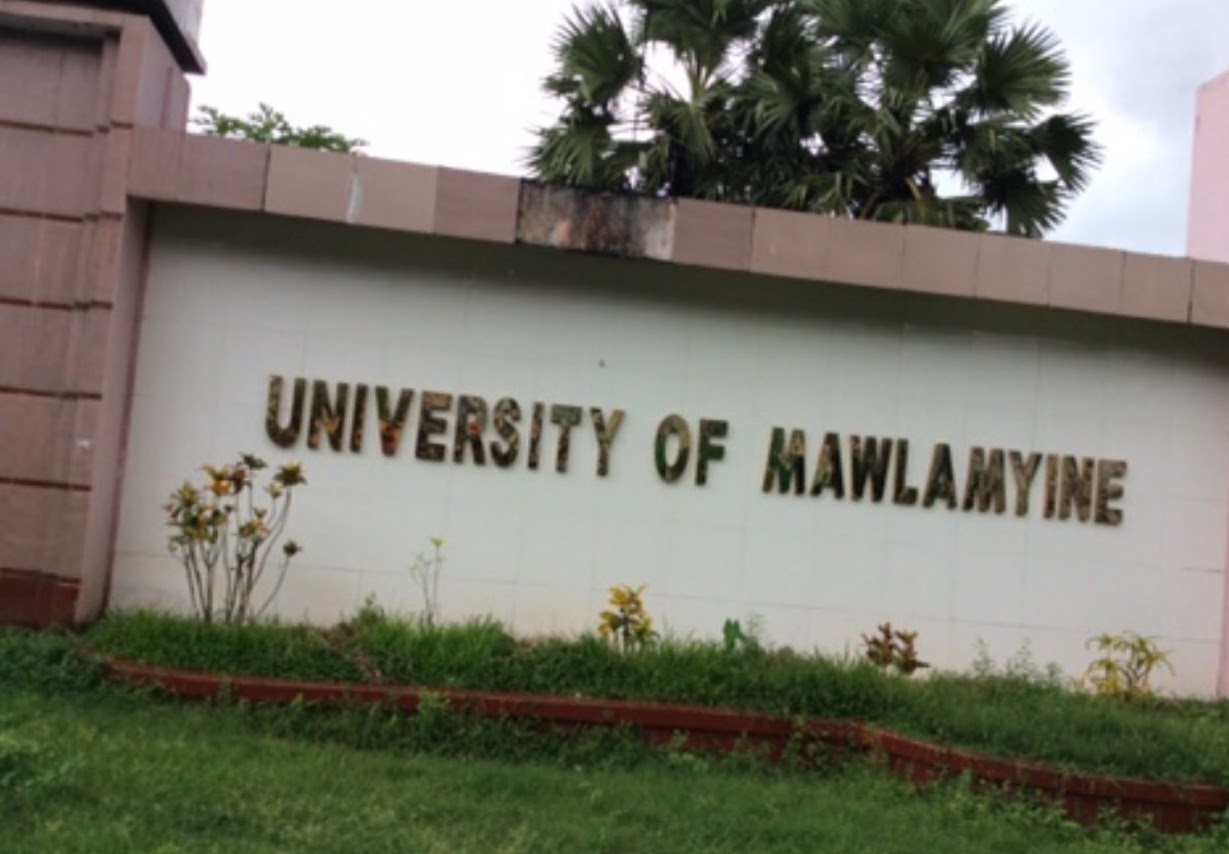
University of Mawlamyine

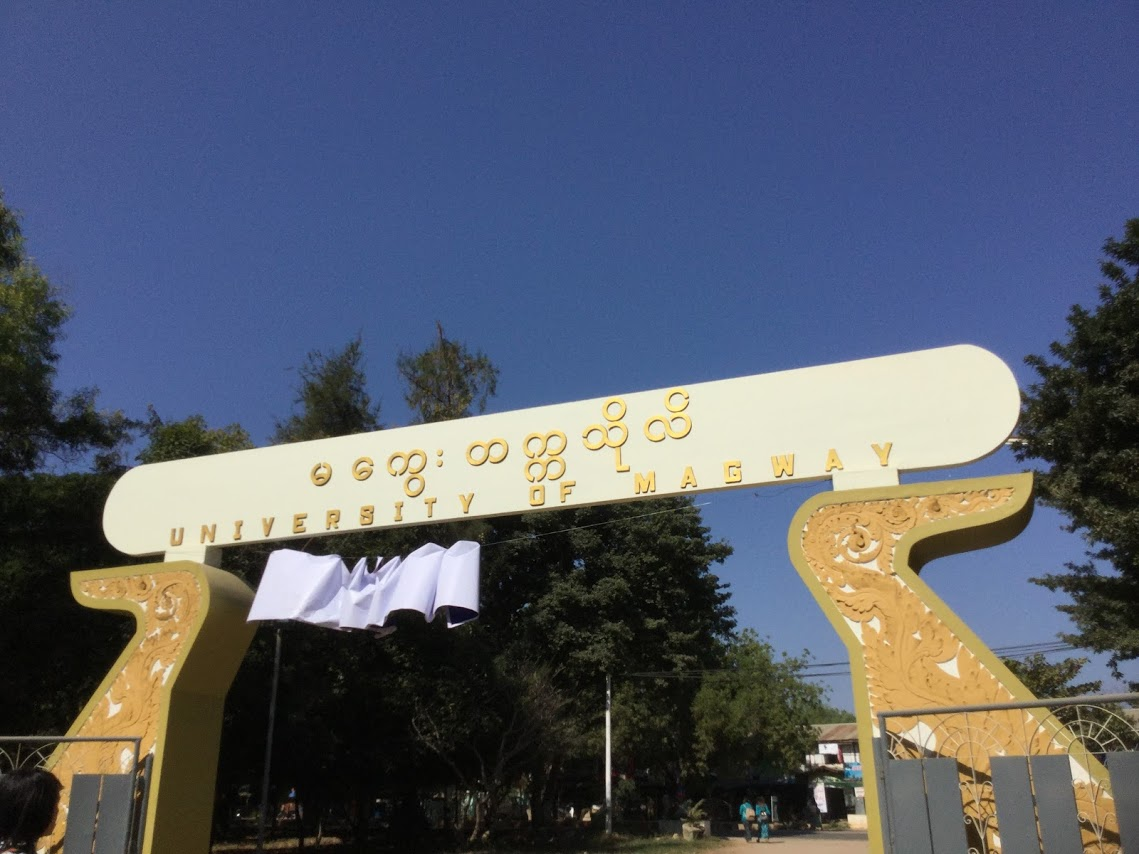
University of Magway

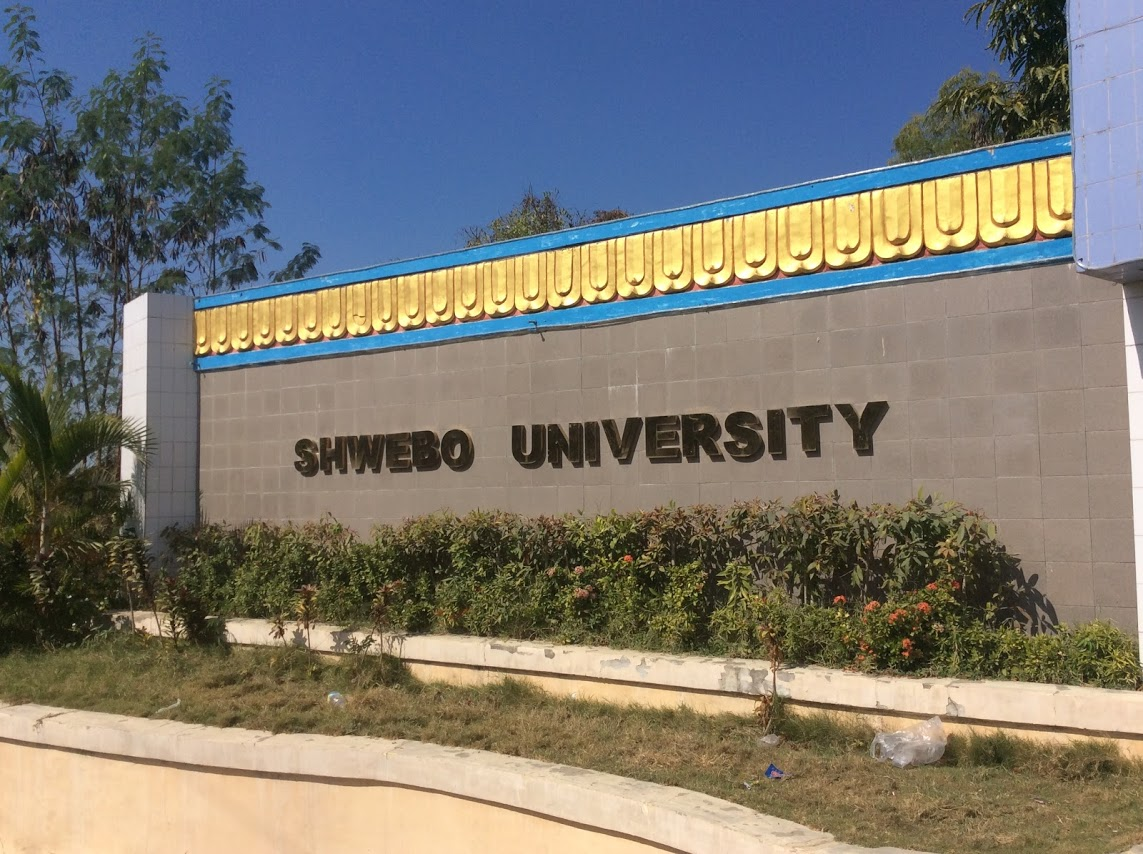
Shwebo University

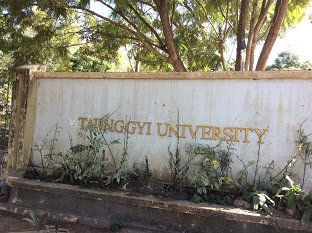
Taunggyi University

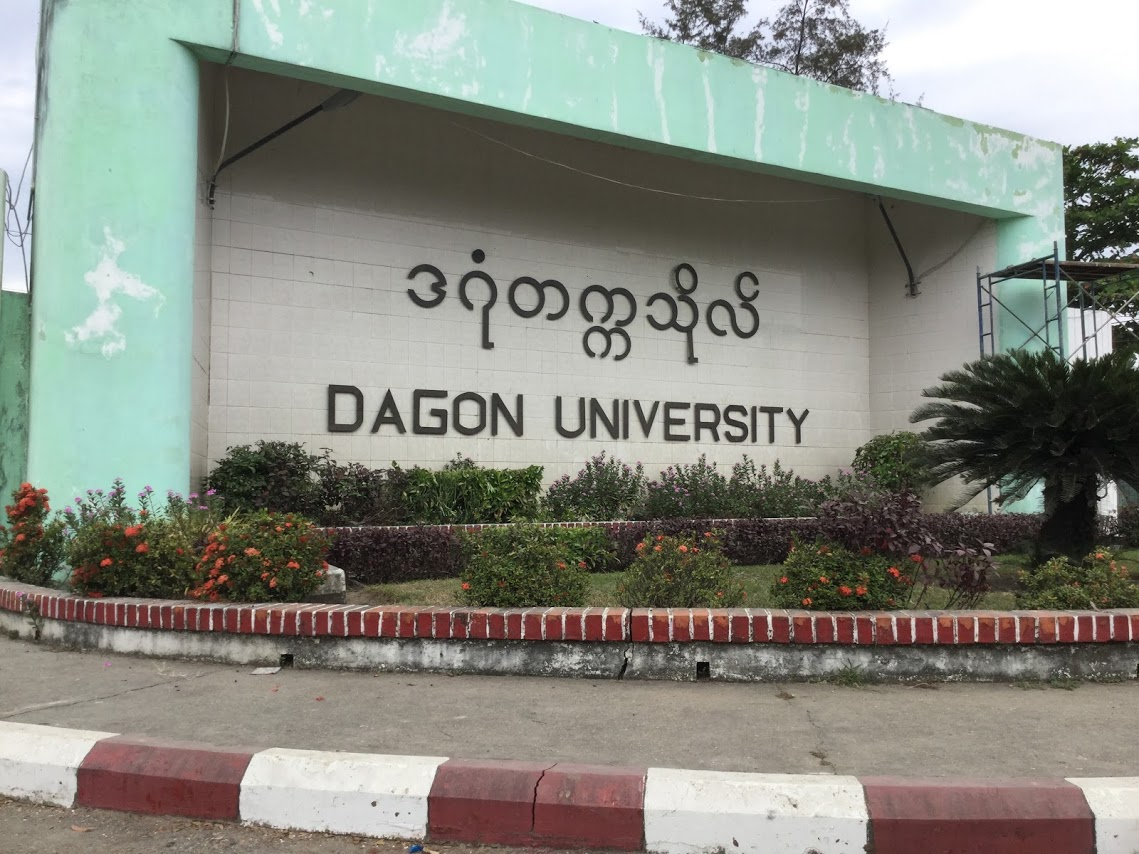
Dagon University

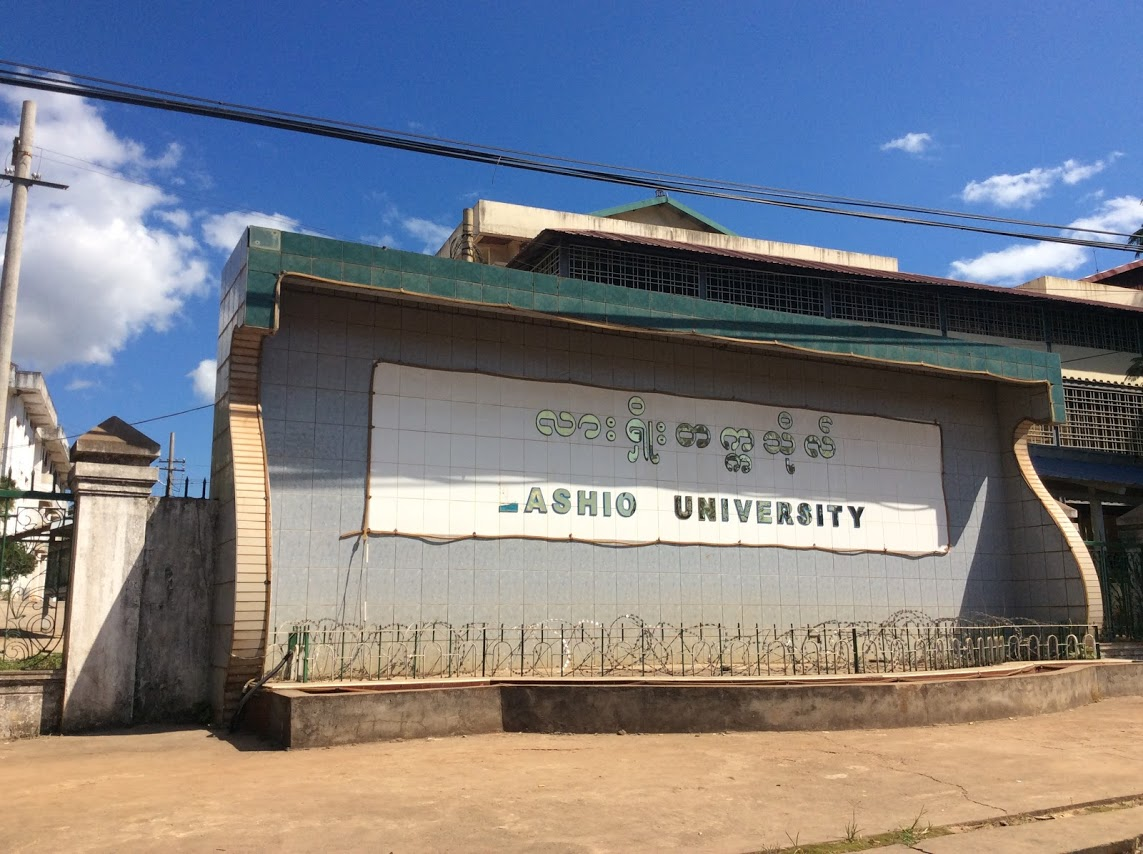
Lashio University

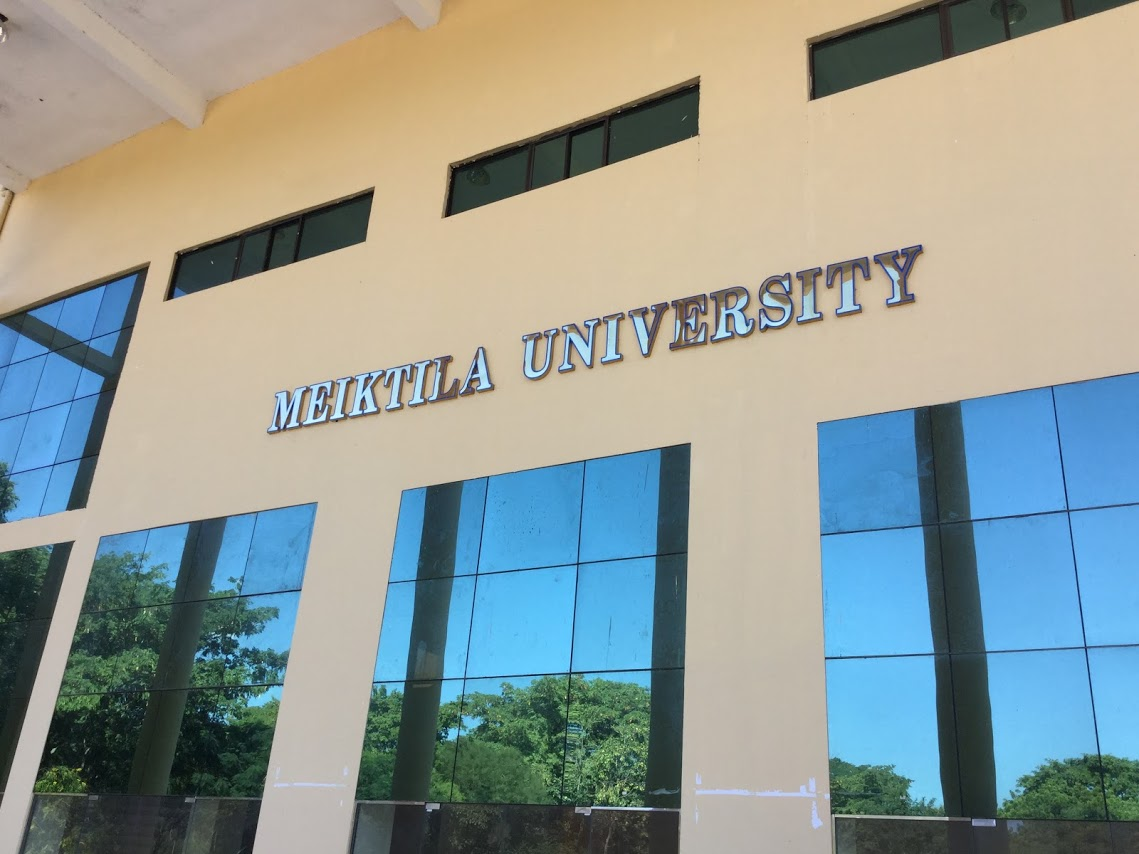
Meiktila University

== See also ==
- Education in Myanmar
