= University of Computer Studies =

University of Computer Studies may refer to the following institutions in Myanmar:

- University of Computer Studies, a part of Polytechnic University (Dawei)
- University of Computer Studies, Kalay
- University of Computer Studies, Mandalay
- University of Computer Studies (Maubin)
- University of Computer Studies, Myeik
- University of Computer Studies (Pakokku)
- University of Computer Studies (Taungoo)
- University of Computer Studies, Yangon
