= University of Computer Studies, Yangon =

University in Yangon, Myanmar

- ရန်ကုန်ကွန်ပျူတာတက္ကသိုလ်
- Other name: ICST
- Motto: မြန်မှန်တွက်ချက် တိုင်းပြည်တွက်
- Type: Public
- Established: 1988; 38 years ago
- Accreditation: MOST
- Academic affiliations: SOI Asia
- Rector: Mie Mie Khin
- Location: Yangon, Myanmar
- Campus: Suburban
- Colors: Turquoise
- Website: www.ucsy.edu.mm

The University of Computer Studies, Yangon (Burmese: ရန်ကုန်ကွန်ပျူတာတက္ကသိုလ် [jàɰ̃ɡòʊɰ̃ kʊ̀ɰ̃pjùtà tɛʔkəθò]), located on the outskirts of Yangon in Hlawga, is the leading IT and computer science university of Myanmar. The university, administered by the Ministry of Education, offers undergraduate and graduate degree programs in computer science and technology. The language of instruction at UCSY is English. Along with the University of Computer Studies, Mandalay, UCSY is one of two premier universities specializing in computer studies, and also one of the most selective universities in the country.

Many of the country's middle and upper level personnel in government and industry are graduates of UCSY.

== History ==
UCSY's origins trace back to the founding of the Universities' Computer Center (UCC) in 1971 at the Hlaing Campus of Yangon University. Equipped with ICL ICL 1902S and with the help of distinguished visiting professors from US, UK and Europe, UCC provided computer education and training to university and government employees. In 1973, it began offering a master's degree program (MSc in Computer Science), and a graduate diploma program (Diploma in Automated Computing) in cooperation with the Mathematics Department of Yangon University. The center added DEC PDP-11/70 mini-computers in 1983, and personal computers in 1990. In 1986, the center added B.C.Sc. (Bachelor of Computer Science) and B.C.Tech. (Bachelor of Computer Technology) degree programs.

In March 1988, the Institute of Computer Science and Technology (ICST) was established, and began offering bachelor's degree programs in Computer Science. In 1993, it started an internationally accepted International Diploma in Computer Studies (IDCS) program with the help of UK's the National Computing Centre (NCC). On 1 January 1997, the university's control was transferred from the Ministry of Education to the Ministry Science and Technology. On 1 July 1998, it was renamed the University of Computer Studies, Yangon. A graduate school with master's and PhD degree programs was established in May 2001.

== Programs ==
UCSY offers five-year bachelor's and two-year master's degree programs in computer science and computer technology. It also offers a two-year post-graduate diploma and a three-year Ph.D. program in computer science and information technology. The language of instruction is English.

| Program | Bachelor's | Master's | Doctorate |
|---|---|---|---|
| Computer Science | B.C.Sc. (Knowledge Engineering) B.C.Sc. (Software Engineering); B.C.Sc. (Cyber Security and Forensics); B.C.Sc. (Business Information Systems); B.C.Sc. (High Performance Computing) | M.C.Sc. (Knowledge Engineering) M.C.Sc. (Software Engineering); M.C.Sc. (Cyber Security and Forensics); M.C.Sc. (Business Information Systems); M.C.Sc. (High Performance Computing) | Ph.D. |
| Computer Technology | B.C.Tech. (Embedded Systems) B.C.Tech. (Computer Communication and Networks) | M.C.Tech. (Embedded Systems) M.C.Tech (Computer Communication and Networks) | Ph.D. |
| Applied Science | None | M.A.Sc. | None |
| Information Science | None | M.I.Sc. | None |

== Faculties ==
- Faculty of Computer Systems and Technologies
- Faculty of Computer Science
- Faculty of Information Science
- Faculty of Computing

=== Supporting departments ===
- Department of Japanese
- Department of English
- Department of Natural Science
- Department of Information Technology Operations

=== Research labs ===
- Natural Language Processing Lab
- Geographic Information System Lab
- Image Processing Lab
- Mobile and Wireless Computing Lab
- Embedded System Lab
- Cyber Security Research Lab
- Cisco Network Lab
- Cloud Computing Lab
- Artificial Intelligence Lab
- Computer Graphics and Visualization
- Database System Lab
- Software Engineering Lab
- Numerical Analysis Lab
- Operation Research Lab
- UCSY-Ishibashi Lab
- UCSY Forensics Lab

== International Collaboration ==
The university is known for working with international universities, research institutes and international governmental organizations.

== Affiliations ==
=== Universities ===
- Keio University of Japan
- Nagoya Institute of Technology
- University of Miyazaki
- Handong Global University
- National Institute of Information and Communications Technology
- University of Computer Studies, Mandalay (UCSM)

=== Other universities ===
The following universities of computer studies are officially affiliated with UCSY. Their qualified graduates can continue their advanced studies at UCSY.

- Computer University, Bamaw
- Computer University, Dawei
- Computer University, Hinthada
- Computer University, Kalay
- Computer University, Kyaingtong
- Computer University, Loikaw
- Computer University, Lashio
- University of Computer Studies (Maubin)
- Computer University, Magway
- Computer University, Thaton
- University of Computer Studies, Mandalay
- Computer University, Mandalay
- Computer University, Monywa
- Computer University, Myeik
- Computer University, Meiktila
- Computer University, Myitkyina
- Computer University, Pathein
- Computer University, Pakokku
- Computer University, Hpa-An
- Computer University, Pyay
- Computer University, Pinlon
- Computer University, Sittwe
- University of Computer Studies (Taungoo)
- University of Computer Studies, Taunggyi

== Alumni ==
There are currently expected to be more than 8,000 alumni. Among the alumni of UCSY, they have become leading educators, developers, PMPs, politicians, businessmen, writers, architects, athletes, actors, musicians, and those that have gained both national and international fame. Among notable alumni, just to name a few, are Dr. Mie Mie Thet Thwin, Rector UCSY; Dr. Saw Sandar Aye, Rector UIT; Dr. Moe Pwint, University of Computer Studies, Mandalay; Dr. Win Aye, Myanmar Institute of Information Technology; Dr. Thinn Thu Naing, University of Computer Studies; Min Maw Kun, Myanmar Academy Award-winning film actor; and many.
