= Panglong =

Panglong (Shan: ပၢင်လူင်; Burmese: ပင်လုံ) may refer to:

== Places ==
- Panglong, Southern Shan State
- Panglong or Pan Lon, a town in Wa State settled by Hui people fleeing persecution in Yunnan
- Panglong, Northern Shan State, a ruby mining town in Namtu Township
- Panglong, another name for Mong Ko in Mu Se Township

== Other ==
- Panglong Agreement, an agreement signed at the Panglong Conference
- Panglong Conference, a conference held at Panglong to discuss Burmese independence from the United Kingdom
- Panglong University, in Panglong, Southern Shan State, Myanmar

== See also ==
- Panlong (disambiguation)
