= University of Computer Studies, Mandalay =

UCSM is COE of Upper Myanmar.

- မန္တလေးကွန်ပျူတာတက္ကသိုလ်
- Other names: UCSM; မကပတ
- Motto: "မြန်မှန်တွက်ချက် တိုင်းပြည်တွက်"
- Motto in English: "Fast and accurate calculations for the country"
- Type: Public
- Established: September 18, 1997; 29 years ago
- Accreditation: Ministry of Science and Technology (MOST); Department of Advanced Science and Technology
- Affiliations: Keio University; UCSY
- Rector: Dr. Khin Thanda Soe
- Dean: Dr. Aye Mon Yi
- Academic staff: 47
- Faculty: 4
- Students: 350 (2025 - 2026) Academic Year
- Location: Mandalay - Mogoke Rd., Patheingyi Township, Mandalay Region, 05071, Myanmar; 22°07′20.7″N 96°11′02.7″E
- Campus: 200 acres (81 ha; 0.81 km^{2}); Suburban
- Language: Burmese; English
- Colors: Royal Red, Royal Ivory
- Website: www.ucsm.edu.mm

The University of Computer Studies, Mandalay (UCSM) (Burmese: မန္တလေး ကွန်ပျူတာ တက္ကသိုလ်, pronounced [máɰ̃dəlé kʊ̀ɰ̃pjùtà tɛʔkəθò]), located in Mandalay, is an IT university in Myanmar. UCSM, also the second oldest IT university in Myanmar. UCSM is promoted as COE in 2012-2013 Academic Year. UCSM offers bachelor's, master's and doctoral degree programs in computer science and technology. The majority of its student body is from Upper Myanmar. Administered by the Ministry of Science and Technology, UCSM is the official university for all the Government Computer Colleges in Upper Myanmar, whose students may continue their advanced studies at UCSM.

UCSM is also a Cisco Networking Academy Program.

== History ==
UCSM was established in May 1997 and held its first classes in September that year. Under Myanmar's system of specialized universities, UCSM was the first specialized university in Upper Myanmar for computer science and technology.

== Degree programmes ==
UCSM's main offerings are five-year bachelor's programs in computer science and computer technology. It also offers master's degree programs in applied science and in information science. The areas of study include artificial intelligence, bioinformatics, computer architecture, control applications, database systems, digital signal processing, image processing, Internet technologies, network security, operating systems, parallel and distributed computing, and software engineering.

Degree Programmes	Bachelor Degree	Master Degree	Doctoral Degree
Computer Science	B.C.Sc. (Software Engineering - SE); B.C.Sc. (Knowledge Engineering - KE); B.C.Sc. (High Performance Computing - HPC); B.C.Sc. (Business Information Systems - BIS)	M. C. Sc. (Software Engineering); M. C. Sc. (Knowledge Engineering); M. C. Sc. (High Performance Computing); M. C. Sc. (Business Information Systems); M. C. Sc. , M. I. Sc.; Master Double Degree Programme (University of Miyazaki, Japan – University of Computer Studies, Mandalay)	Ph.D. (Information Technology)
Computer Technology	B.C.Tech. (Computer Communication and Networks), B.C.Tech. (Embedded Systems)	M. C. Tech. (Computer Communication and Networks); M. C. Tech. (Embedded Systems); M. C. Tech. , M. A. Sc.; Master Double Degree Programme (University of Miyazaki, Japan – University of Computer Studies, Mandalay)	Ph.D. (Information Technology)

== Academic departments ==
UCSM consists of four faculties and five academic departments.

- Faculty of Computer Science (FCS)
- Faculty of Computer Systems and Technologies (FCST)
- Faculty of Information Science (FIS)
- Faculty of Computing (FC)
- Department of Physics (DP)
- Department of English (DE)
- Department of Myanmar (DM)
- Department of Information Technology Support and Maintenance (DITSM)
- Department of Administration and Finance (DAF)
- International Relations Department (IR)
- Career Department (Career)

== Affiliations ==
=== Senior universities ===
- Keio University of Japan
- University of Computer Studies, Yangon (UCSY)

=== Colleges ===
The following Upper Myanmar-based government computer colleges are officially affiliated with UCSM. Their qualified graduates can continue their advanced studies at UCSM.

- Computer University, Myitkyina
- Computer University, Bhamo
- Computer University, Kalay
- Computer University, Monywa
- Computer University, Mandalay
- Computer University, Pakokku
- Computer University, Lashio
- Computer University, Kengtung
- Computer University, Taunggyi
- Computer University, Panglong
- Computer University, Meiktila
- Computer University, Magway
