= Khin Hnin Kyi Thar =

Burmese writer, journalist, and philanthropist

- ခင်နှင်းကြည်သာ
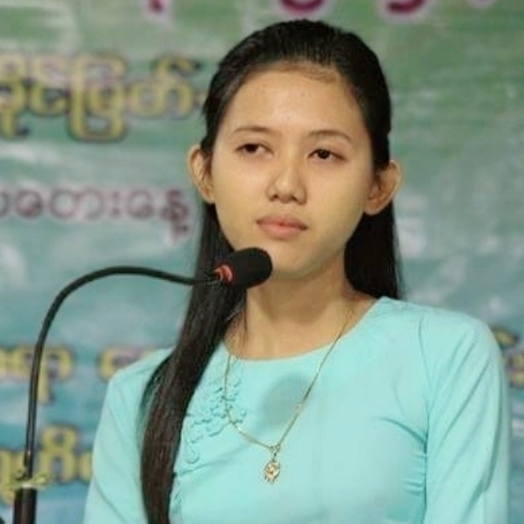
- Khin Hnin Kyi Thar at the literary event
- Born: 29 December 1986 (age 39); Pyinmana, Burma
- Education: East Yangon University; Yangon University
- Occupations: Philanthropist, Journalist, Writer
- Spouse: Phyo Wai Myint
- Parent(s): Maung Maung San; Khin Ma Ma
- Awards: Citizen of Burma Award

Khin Hnin Kyi Thar (Burmese: ခင်နှင်းကြည်သာ; born 29 December 1986) is a Burmese philanthropist, journalist and writer. She is best known for her philanthropic work in Myanmar and as founder of the Individual Philanthropic Network.

Khin listed in the Irrawaddy Magazine’s "Most Notable People of 2015" and also named in the Mizzima's "Outstanding pioneer women in the era of Myanmar".

== Early life and education ==
Khin Hnin Kyi Thar was born on 29 December 1986 in Pyinmana, Mandalay Region, Myanmar but growing up in Yezin. She is the youngest of four siblings of Dr Maung Maung San and his wife Dr Khin Ma Ma. She has three older sisters. Her father is a veterinary physician who served as rector of the University of Veterinary Science, Yezin and also a writer under his pen name Kyi Min. Her mother is also a veterinary physician who served as Pro-Rector of the University of Veterinary Science, Yezin. She graduated with a B.A (Library and information) from East Yangon University in 2006 and MLI from Yangon University in 2008.

== Career ==
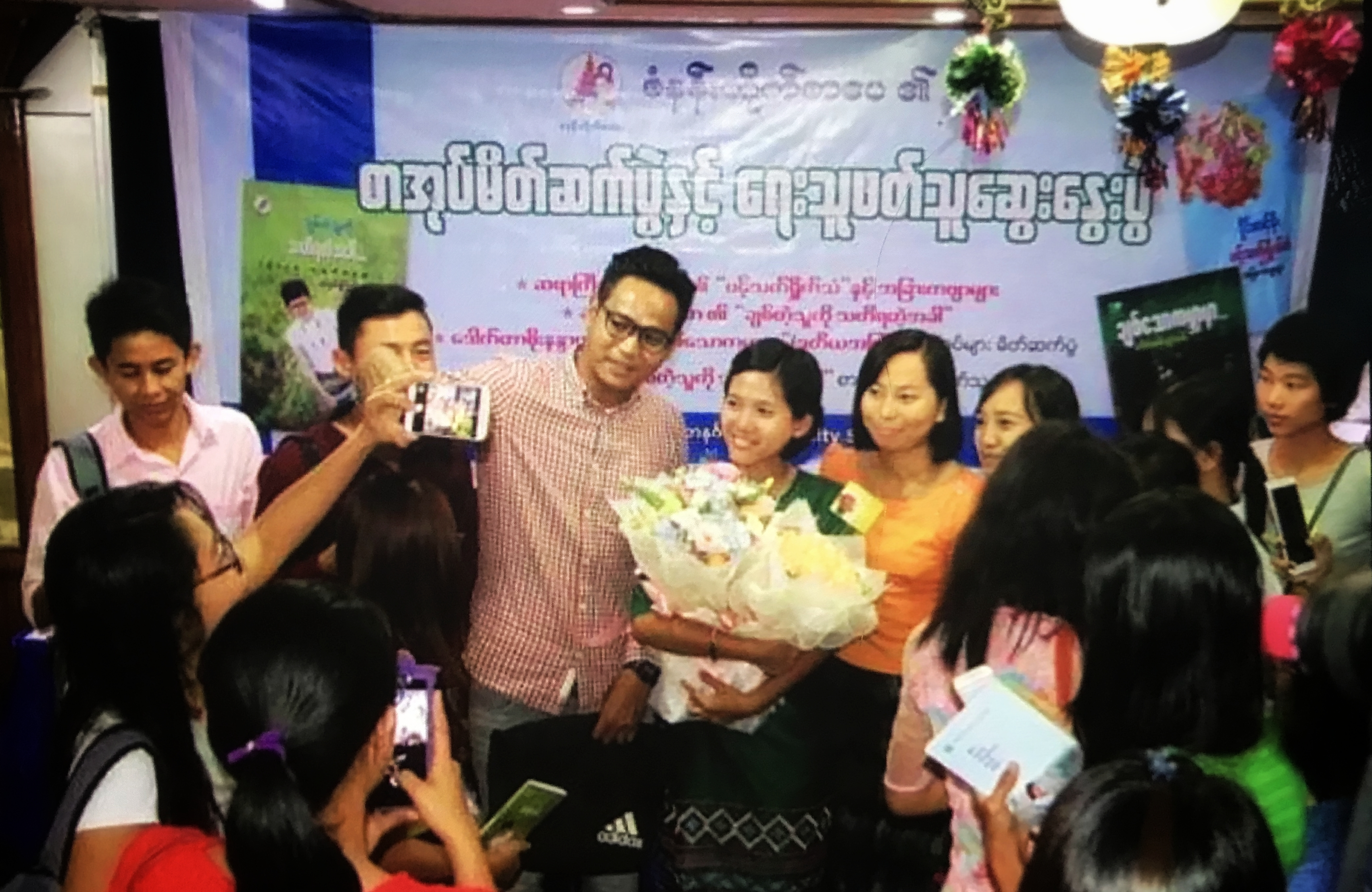
Khin Hnin Kyi Thar at her book-signing event in 2017

Khin has enthralled in philanthropy since her childhood as a family value passed down by her parents. She been doing philanthropic work since 2007 and working as a journalist in 2010. She worked as a journalist and reporter at the Venus News Weekly Journal from 2011 to 2014, Myitmakha News Agency from 2014 to 2016 and also worked a producer at DVB TV News from 2016 to 2018. As a journalist, she and her colleagues founded the "Individual Philanthropists Network" that extols the virtues of philanthropy in the country.

Her philanthropic work won her the Citizen of Burma Award in 2014 while her life story inspired a novel by Linkar Yi Kyaw. She published a book Chit Tae Thu Ko Thadi Ya Tae Akhar (When Missing Lovers) in 2017 and which included in the best seller books of the year 2017.

== Political activities ==
Following the 2021 Myanmar coup d'état, Khin Hnin Kyi Thar was active in the anti-coup movement both in person at rallies and through social media. She joined the "We Want Justice" three-finger salute movement. The movement was launched on social media, and many celebrities have joined the movement.

On 5 April 2021, warrants for her arrest were issued under section 505 (a) of the penal code by the State Administration Council for speaking out against the military coup. Along with several other celebrities, she was charged with calling for participation in the Civil Disobedience Movement (CDM) and damaging the state's ability to govern, with supporting the Committee Representing Pyidaungsu Hluttaw, and with generally inciting the people to disturb the peace and stability of the nation.

== Personal life ==
On 2 June 2019, Khin married Phyo Wai Myint, a philanthropist. She has 3 other siblings Hnin Le Wai, Su Thet Hninn and Mya Hninn Aye, Who is a Unknown Journalist Who Lives in Maryland

== Work ==
- Chit Tae Thu Ko Thadi Ya Tae Akhar (When Missing Lovers) (2017)
