= Khin Ma Ma =

Burmese veterinary physician (1947–2019)

- ခင်မမ

Pro-Rector of the University of Veterinary Science, Yezin
- In office 15 October 2004 – 22 September 2008
- Succeeded by: Tin Ngwe

Personal details
- Born: 22 September 1947 Rangoon, Burma
- Died: 20 February 2019 (aged 71) Yangon General Hospital
- Spouse: Maung Maung San
- Children: 4, including Khin Hnin Kyi Thar
- Parent(s): Nyi Pu (father); Kyin Si (mother)
- Education: Faculty of Veterinary Medicine, Rangoon (B.V.S); University of Veterinary Science, Yezin (M.V.Sc.); Massey University (D.V.C.S.)
- Occupation: Veterinary physician, Professor, Pro-Rector,

Khin Ma Ma (Burmese: ခင်မမ; 22 September 1947 – 20 February 2019) was a Burmese veterinary physician and professor who served as pro-rector of the University of Veterinary Science, Yezin from 15 October 2004 to 22 September 2008.

== Biography ==
Khin Ma Ma was born on 22 September 1947 in Rangoon, Burma to parents Nyi Pu and his wife Kyin Si. She graduated with B.V.S. from Faculty of Veterinary Medicine under Rangoon University, M.V.Sc. from University of Veterinary Science, Yezin, and D.V.C.S from Massey University. She married Maung Maung San, a veterinary physician who served as rector of the University of Veterinary Science, Yezin and also a writer under his pen name Kyi Min. They have four daughters, one of her daughter Khin Hnin Kyi Thar is a prominent philanthropist.

She had held highest-level appointed administrative post Pro-Rector at a major academic institution University of Veterinary Science, Yezin from 15 October 2004 to 22 September 2008 and also a permanent member of the Myanmar Veterinary Association.

She died on 20 February 2019 in Yangon General Hospital as a result of injuries sustained in a car accident at the near Myo Chaung on the 85 miles.
