= Myat Thidar Tun =

Burmese politician and lawyer

Member of the Amyotha Hluttaw
- In office 3 February 2016 – 1 February 2021
- Constituency: Mon State № 5
- Majority: 24375 votes

Personal details
- Born: 7 October 1981 (age 44) Mandalay, Myanmar
- Party: National League for Democracy
- Parent(s): Ngwe Myint (father); Myint Myint Swe (mother)
- Education: Government Technical Institute (Mawlamyine); Mawlamyaing University

Myat Thidar Tun (Burmese: မြတ်သီတာထွန်း, born 7 October 1981) is a Burmese politician and lawyer currently serving as an Amyotha Hluttaw MP for Mon State No. 5 constituency. She is a member of the National League for Democracy.

== Early life and education ==
Myat was born on 7 October 1981 in Mandalay, Myanmar. She graduated with A.G.T.I (MT) from Government Technical Institute (Mawlamyine) and LL.B from Mawlamyaing University. She is also a lawyer.

== Political career ==
She is a member of the National League for Democracy. In the 2015 Myanmar general election, she was elected as an Amyotha Hluttaw MP, winning a majority of 24375 votes and elected representative from Mon State No. 5 parliamentary constituency.
