= Maung Maung San =

Burmese veterinary physician and writer (born 0946)

- မောင်မောင်စံ

Pro-Rector of the University of Veterinary Science, Yezin
- In office 14 June 2002 – 5 December 2004
- Preceded by: Tun Sein
- Succeeded by: Aung Than

Rector of the University of Veterinary Science, Yezin
- In office 5 January 2004 – 5 August 2004
- Preceded by: Tun Sein
- Succeeded by: Aung Than

Personal details
- Born: 29 December 1946 (age 79) Pathein, Ayeyarwady Division, Myanmar
- Spouse: Khin Ma Ma
- Children: Khin Hnin Kyi Thar
- Education: Yezin Institute of Veterinary Science; University of Queensland
- Occupation: Veterinary physician, writer

Maung Maung San (Burmese: မောင်မောင်စံ; born 29 December 1946), also known by his pen names Kyi Min (Burmese: ကြည်မင်း) and Kyaw Saw Min (ကျော်စောမင်း), is a Burmese writer and a former veterinary physician. He has served as Rector and Pro-rector of the University of Veterinary Science, Yezin. He is a former senior member of Myanmar Press Council.

== Biography ==
Maung Maung San was born on 29 December 1946 in Pathein, Ayeyarwady Division, Myanmar. He started studying veterinary science in 1968. He graduated with B.V.S from the Yezin Institute of Veterinary Science and M.V.Sc from the University of Queensland. He wrote many books under his pen names Kyi Min and later Kyaw Saw Min.

His book Phat Kyi won the Sayarwon Tin Shwe Literature Award in 2017. He has published over 40 books during his career.

== Personal life ==
He married Khin Ma Ma, a veterinary physician who served as Pro-Rector of the University of Veterinary Science, Yezin. His daughter Khin Hnin Kyi Thar is a prominent philanthropist, journalist and writer.

== Works ==
Over 40 books including:

- ပညာခရီးနှင့် ပညာမျက်စိ (2009)
- သမိုင်း သို့မဟုတ် ခေတ်ရုပ်ပုံကား
- ဒေါ်စုသို့ပေးစာ
- ရှင်းတူးရှင်တူး (2015)
- ဦးအောင်သင်းနှင့် ကျွန်တော် (2016)
- Phat Kyi (ဖတ်ကြည့်, Read it) (2017)
