= Info Myanmar University =

University in Myanmar

- အင်ဖိုမြန်မာ တက္ကသိုလ်
- Former names: IMCS, Info Myanmar College
- Type: Private
- Established: 2019; 7 years ago – granted University status 2014; 12 years ago as Info Myanmar College; 2007; 19 years ago as IMCS
- Founder: Daw Nu Nu Thant
- Location: Yangon, Yangon Region, Myanmar; 16°49′25.1″N 96°7′49.1″E
- Campus: Urban Area
- Language: Burmese၊ English
- Website: imu.edu.mm

Info Myanmar University (Burmese: အင်ဖိုမြန်မာတက္ကသိုလ်; abbreviated IMU) is a private university in Yangon, Myanmar. Info Myanmar College (IMC), the computing arm of IMCS Co., Ltd. which has achieved success in the International ICT courses and vocational trainings since 2007, was established in 2014 with the aim to meet the educational requirements of the age of knowledge-based society through transforming digital economy in Myanmar. IMC was promoted to Info Myanmar University (IMU) in 2019. IMU offers the Higher National Certificate In Computing, Higher National Diploma In Computing and B.Sc(Hons) in Computing programs in partnership with Edinburgh Napier University since 2017.

== History ==
IMCS was founded by Daw Nu Nu Thant in 2007 as a vocational training center. And then in 2014, as the computing arm of IMCS Co., Ltd., IMC was established as a Pearson Accredited Center. In 2019, IMC was promoted to IMU (Info Myanmar University). In 2017, IMC was partnered with a government University of United Kingdom, Edinburgh Napier University. Info Myanmar University, IMU, currently offers B.Sc (Hons) in Computing, M.Sc ( Advanced Security & Digital Forensics) Programs in partnership with Edinburgh Napier University, UK.

== Campuses ==
The University is based at its main campuses near Pyay Rd, Kamayut Township, Yangon, Myanmar (Burma).
