= Polytechnic University, Myeik =

University in Myeik, Myanmar

Coordinates: 12°31′53″N 98°42′04″E

Polytechnic University (Myeik)
- ပိုလီတက္ကနစ်တက္ကသိုလ် (မြိတ်); IPA: [nɪnpəɲà tɛʔkəθò (mjeɪʔ)]
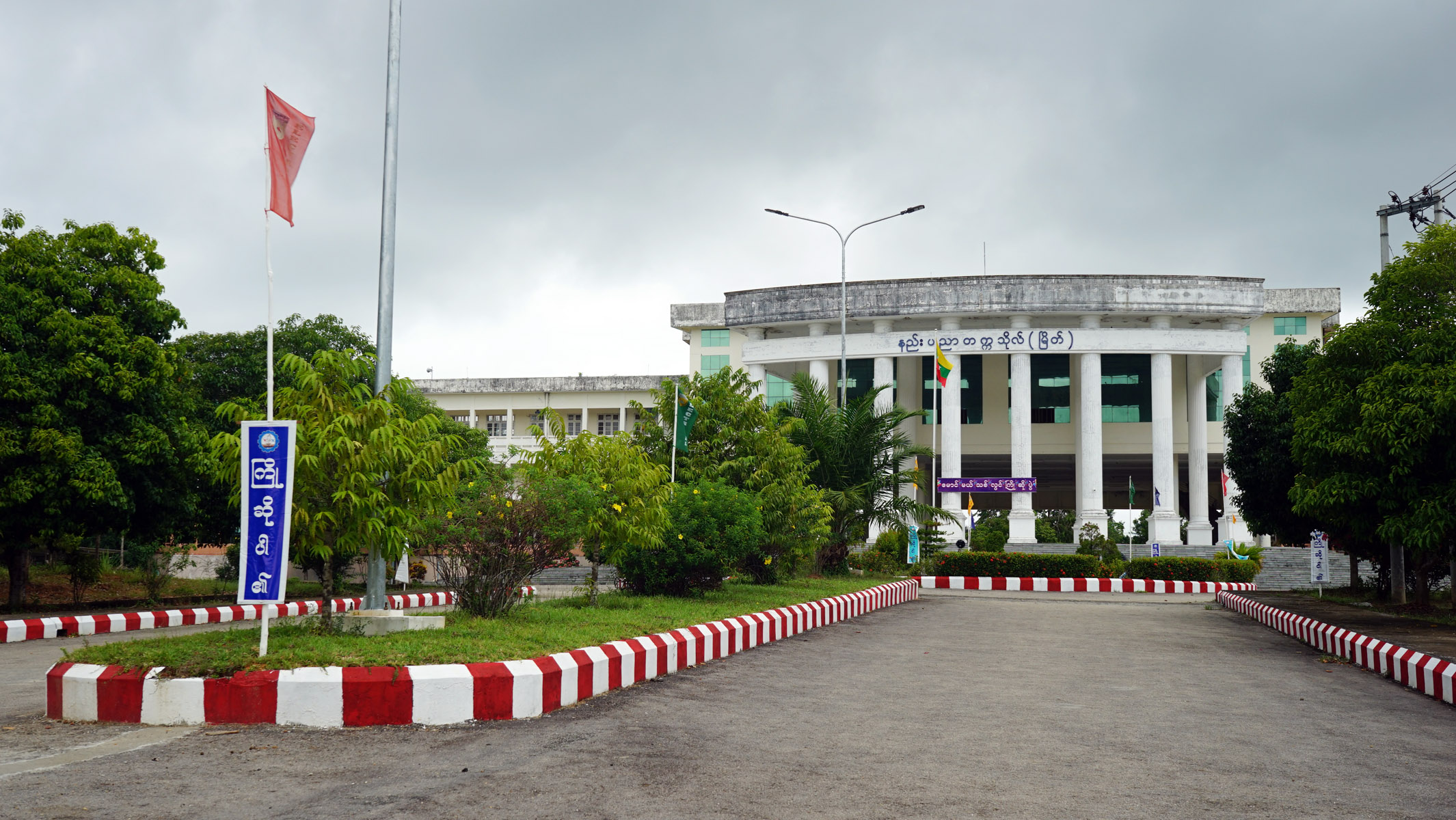
- Front entrance of Polytechnic University (Myeik)
- Former names: Government Technical Institute; Government Technological College; Technological University (Myeik)
- Type: Public
- Established: 2007; 19 years ago
- Rector: Dr Aung Naing Myint
- Location: Myeik, Taninthayi Region, Myanmar
- Website: tumyeik.moe-st.gov.mm

Polytechnic University (Myeik) (Burmese: ပိုလီတက္ကနစ်တက္ကသိုလ် (မြိတ်)) (formerly Technological University (Myeik)) is situated on the Yangon-Myeik Road and covers an area of approximately 7.87 acres. It is located in the village of Kabin, in the township of Myeik, Taninthayi Region, Myanmar.

It was established as Government Technological Institute (GTI) on 27 October 1999. It was promoted to Government Technological College (GTC) in January 2002 and to the university level in January 2007.

Technological University (Myeik) has produced human resources annually. The university offers graduate and under-graduate degree programs. Its library provides students access to books and CDs.

== Departments ==
- Civil Engineering Department
- Electronic Communication Department
- Electrical Power Department
- Mechanical Department
- Literature Department (Myanmar, English)
- Chemistry Department
- Physics Department
- Mathematics Department
- Technological university (Myeik) Students' Union
- Technological university (Myeik) Teachers' Union

== Programs ==
No	Graduate Degree Program	Degree	Duration
1	Bachelor of Civil Engineering	B.E	6 years
2	Bachelor of Electronic Engineering	B.E	Full
3	Bachelor of Mechanical Engineering	B.E	Time
4	Bachelor of Electrical Power Engineering	B.E	

== See also ==
- list of universities in Burma
- Myeik University
- University of Computer Studies, Myeik
