= Myeik University =

University in Myeik, Myanmar

- မြိတ်တက္ကသိုလ် IPA: [mjeɪʔ tɛʔkəθò]
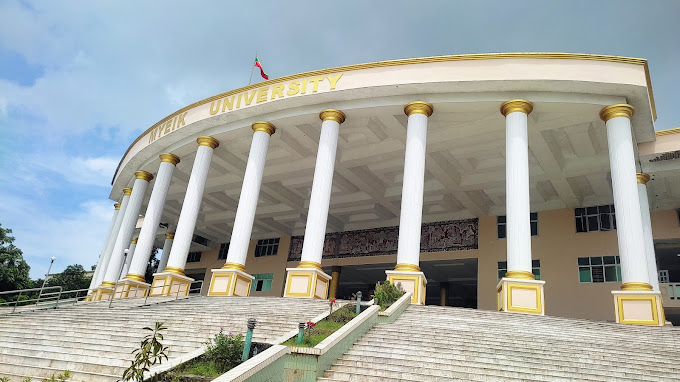
- Convocation Hall of Myeik University
- Other name: University of Myeik
- Former names: Myeik College (1999); Myeik Degree College (2001)
- Motto: ဝိဇ္ဇံသိပ္ပံ၊ ပရမံပညံ (Pali: Vijjāṃ sippāṃ paramāṃ paññaṃ)
- Type: Public
- Established: 24 September 1999; 26 years ago
- Rector: Dr. Win Win Ei
- Location: Myeik, Tanintharyi Region, Myanmar; 12.467010°N 98.612375°E
- Campus: Urban
- Website: www.myeikuniversity.edu.mm

Myeik University (Burmese: မြိတ် တက္ကသိုလ်; formerly Myeik College and Myeik Degree College) is a public university in Myeik, Myanmar. The university was founded as Myeik College on 24 September 1999, upgraded to Myeik Degree College on 27 November 2001 and to Myeik University on 14 May 2003.

Members of Myeik University, alongside the Myanmar Bird and Nature Society, identified 20 new bird species in Myanmar from 2010 to 2014.

== See also ==
- list of universities in Burma
- University of Computer Studies, Myeik
- Technological University, Myeik
