= Panlong =

Panlong may refer to:

- Panlongcheng or Panlong City, major archaeological site
- Panlong District (盘龙区), Kunming, Yunnan, China
- Panlong River (盘龙河), river in Kunming
- Panlong (mythology) (蟠龍), ancient motif in Chinese art
- Panlong Subtownship, Wa Self-Administered Division, Shan State, Myanmar
- Panlong or Pan Lon, capital of Panlong Subtownship
- Panlong Road Station, Shanghai Metro station

Towns

Written as "盘龙镇":

- Panlong, Rongchang County, in Rongchang County, Chongqing
- Panlong, Yunyang County, in Yunyang County, Chongqing
- Panlong, Queshan County, in Queshan County, Henan
- Panlong, Guangyuan, in Lizhou District, Guangyuan, Sichuan
- Panlong, Nanbu County, in Nanbu County, Sichuan

Written as "蟠龙镇":

- Panlong, Liangping County, in Liangping County, Chongqing
- Panlong, Baoji, in Jintai District, Baoji, Shaanxi
- Panlong, Yan'an, in Baota District, Yan'an, Shaanxi
- Panlong, Wuxiang County, in Wuxiang County, Shanxi

== See also ==
- Panglong (disambiguation)
