= British University College =

University in Myanmar

- Type: Private
- Established: 2017; 9 years ago
- Chairman: Professor Tim Boatswain
- Location: S25, U Chit Maung Housing, U Chit Maung Road, Tamwe Township, Yangon, Myanmar; 16.8165°N 96.1680°E
- Campus: Urban
- Website: buc.edu.mm

British University College is a private higher education institution in Myanmar, established in 2017 in Tamwe Township, Yangon. It is in partnership with the University of Sunderland in the United Kingdom and offers BA(Hons) in Business Management, BSc (Hons) in Computer Science and Master of Business Administration.

In accordance with the directives of the Ministry of Education of Myanmar, British University College was officially renamed British United College on February 18, 2025.

== Programmes Offer ==
Programmes Offer at British University College
| Level | Programme |
|---|---|
| Diploma and Certificate | General English and English for Academic Purposes |
| Diploma and Certificate | International Foundation Programme |
| Higher Diploma | Higher Diploma in Business |
| Higher Diploma | Higher Diploma in Infocomm Technology |
| Bachelor's Degree | BA (Hons) in Business Management |
| Bachelor's Degree | BS.c (Hons) in Computer Science |
| Master's Degree | Master of Business Administration |
