= Yezin Agricultural University =

University in Myanmar

Yezin Agricultural University (YAU)
- ရေဆင်း စိုက်ပျိုးရေး တက္ကသိုလ်
- Motto: Uplift the Nation through Agriculture စိုက်ပျိုးပညာ ပြည်ရွာဖွံ့ဖြိုး
- Type: Public
- Established: 22 December 1924; 101 years ago
- Affiliations: Ministry of Agriculture, Livestock and Irrigation (MOALI)
- Rector: Dr. Theingi Myint
- Administrative staff: 661
- Students: 300 per intake
- Location: Yezin, Pyinmana; Naypyidaw, Myanmar; 19.833213°N 96.275105°E
- Website: www.yau.edu.mm

Yezin Agricultural University (YAU) (Burmese: ရေဆင်း စိုက်ပျိုးရေး တက္ကသိုလ် [jèzɪ́ɰ̃ saɪʔpjójé tɛʔkəθò]) is a higher academic institution of learning in agriculture, in Yezin, Naypyitaw , Myanmar. YAU also has major campuses in Mawlamyine and Hlegu, as well as five smaller regional campuses in Aungpan, Hmawbi, Kyaukse, Magway and Phyu. The Ministry of Agriculture, Livestock and Irrigation administered university offers primarily a four-year Bachelor of Agricultural Science (BAgrSc) program in addition to small master's and doctorate programs. Starting from the 2009 academic year, third-year and fourth-year undergraduate students have to select one crop as a specialized subject and study off campus at one of seven designated farms of the Myanmar Agricultural Service. YAU produces more than 200 graduates both for bachelor and postgraduates each year. The university has already produced more than 9000 bachelor's degree holders together with numbers of postgraduate degrees up to 2012.

== History ==
Agricultural education at the college level in Myanmar began in 1924 with the establishment of the Agricultural College and Research Institute of Mandalay, offering a 3-year diploma course. In 1938, the college became a constituent college of Rangoon University. Students who had passed the Intermediate of Science examination of the Rangoon University were admitted to the agricultural course and were conferred BSc (Agriculture) degree after a two-year period of study. In 1947, the college was upgraded to the Faculty of Agriculture in Mandalay under the administration of Rangoon University. The two-year agricultural course was extended to a three-year course in 1955 and BSc (Sericulture) degree was also awarded in that year. The Faculty of Agriculture was further upgraded to a separate university known as the Institute of Agriculture in 1964.

An expansion program moved the institute from Mandalay to Yezin in 1973 with the aim of training more students and providing more practical experience. In 1993 it was transferred from the Higher Education Department of the Ministry of Education to the Ministry of Agriculture and Irrigation. It was renamed Yezin Agricultural University in 1998.

The university began a master's degree program in 1978 and a doctorate degree program in 2001.

== Admissions ==
YAU accepts only 250 first-year undergraduate students a year. Admission criteria to YAU were based primary on college matriculation exam marks and Burmese citizenship until 2006. Since 2006, the admission criteria have been based on the entrance examination administered by the university. High school graduates have to take the entrance examination in english and biology, and pass an interview. The school accepts additional 30 third-year students from a pool of top students with a Diploma in Agriculture from one of the state agricultural institutes.

== Programs ==
YAU offers a five-year Bachelor of Agricultural Science (BAgrSc) degree program, a three-year Master of Agricultural Science (MAgrSc) degree program, and a doctorate (PhD) program.

=== Bachelor's degree (B.Agr.Sc.) ===
Sr.	Programs
1	Rice Crop Production
2	Plant Protection
3	Horticultural Crops Production
4	Plantation Crops Production
5	Sugar Crops Production
6	Maize and Other Cereal Crops Production
7	Oilseed Crops and Pulses Production
8	Cotton and Other Fiber Crops Production
9	Agri-Business management
10	Soil and Water Management

=== Post-graduate degree (M.Agr.Sc., Ph.D., M.Phil.) ===
Sr.	Programs
1	Agronomy
2	Plant Breeding, Physiology and Ecology (Agricultural Botany)
3	Agricultural Chemistry
4	Plant Pathology
5	Entomology
6	Horticulture
7	Agricultural Economics

=== Post-graduate diplomas ===
Sr.	Programs
1	Postgraad Dip.Agr.Sc. (Agronomy)
2	Postgraad Dip.Agr.Sc. (Agri. Botany)
3	Postgraad Dip.Agr.Sc. (Agri. Chemistry)
4	Postgraad Dip.Agr.Sc. (Plant Pathology)
5	Postgraad Dip.Agr.Sc. (Entomology)
6	Postgraad Dip.Agr.Sc. (Horticulture)
7	Postgraad Dip.Agr.Sc. (Agri. Economics)

Starting from the 2009 academic year, third-year and fourth-year undergraduate students have to select one crop as a specialized subject and study off-campus at one of seven designated farms of the Myanmar Agricultural Service. The aim is to "expose students to their specialized crop and do more research in order to become crop specialists". The farms growing the specialized crops are paddy in Hmawbi in Yangon Region; maize and cereals in Aungban in Shan State; pulse and oil crops in Magway in Magway Region; cotton in Nangyaw in Mandalay Region; sugarcane in Nyaungbintha in Bago Region; perennial crops in Hpa Auk in Mon State, and horticultural crops in Hlegu in Yangon Region. Fourth-year students must take one elective course in agronomy, agricultural botany, agricultural chemistry, entomology, plant pathology, horticulture and agricultural economics. Each class typically has 27 students who were chosen based on their second-year examination marks.

== Faculty and administration ==
YAU is administered by the Ministry of Agriculture of Myanmar. In 2005, YAU maintained a staff of 600 including a 140 academic staff of whom 75 per cent have received training overseas.

The university comprises thirteen major academic departments and four supporting academic departments.

=== Main departments ===
Sr.	Departments
1	Department of Agronomy
2	Department of Plant Breeding, Physiology and Ecology
3	Department of Soil and Water Science
4	Department of Agricultural Economics
5	Department of Horticulture
6	Department of Entomology
7	Department of Plant Pathology
8	Department of Food Science and Technology
9	Department of Agricultural Extension
10	Department of Agricultural Engineering
11	Department of Agricultural Microbiology
12	Department of Agricultural Biotechnology
13	Department of Animal Science

=== Supporting departments ===
Sr.	Departments
1	Department of Agricultural Engineering
2	Department of Animal Science
3	Department of Burmese
4	Department of English
5	Department of Mathematics
6	Department of Physics

== Timeline of YAU ==
The agricultural education at the college level in the Union of Myanmar was started on December 22, 1924 with the establishment of the Agricultural College and Research Institute of Mandalay. The college offered a three-year diploma program. The college was closed from 1933 to 1937 due to the Great Depression.

In 1938, the college became a constituent college of the University of Rangoon. Students who had passed the Intermediate of Science examination of the Rangoon University were admitted to the agricultural course and were conferred a B.Sc. (Agriculture) degree after two years of study. The college was closed from 1942 to 1945 due to the Second World War. After the war, temporary arrangements were made for the second year agricultural students to continue their studies at Mahling Farm for the academic year 1945–46.

In 1947, the college was transformed to the status of Faculty of Agriculture in Mandalay under the administration of the University of Rangoon. The two-year agricultural course was extended to three-year course in 1955 and B.Sc. (Sericulture) degree was also awarded in that year.

The Intermediate College of Mandalay became a separate university in 1958, and the Faculty of Agriculture was placed under the University of Mandalay.

The Faculty of Agriculture was upgraded to the separate university known as the Institute of Agriculture. Due to the expansion program, the Institute was relocated from Mandalay to Yezin in 1973. It began offering master's degree programs in 1978.

The Yezin Agricultural University was transferred from the Higher Education Department, Ministry of Education to the Ministry of Agriculture and Irrigation on 1 September 1993. In 1998, the Institute of Agriculture was renamed as Yezin Agricultural University. It began offering Ph.D. courses in November 2001. In 2019, Yezin Agricultural University opened a facility to study Israeli techniques for agriculture and water management.

Timeline of YAU

Year	History
1924	Founded in Mandalay as the Burma Agricultural College and Research Institute
1938	Constituent College of Rangoon University
1947	Faculty of Agriculture in Mandalay under Rangoon University
1958	Faculty of Agriculture under Mandalay University
1964	Achieves separate university status as the Institute of Agriculture
1973	Moved to Yezin Campus
1978	Begins offering master's degree programs
1993	Moved under the purview of the Ministry of Agriculture and Irrigation
1996	Reorganization of Horticulture and Agricultural Economics Departments
1997	The first step towards International Academic Collaboration
1998	Renamed “Yezin Agricultural University (YAU)”
1999	Diamond Jubilee Celebration of its foundation on 22 December 1924
2001	Begins offering doctoral programs

== Principals and rectors ==
Mandalay (1924–1980)

Name	Rank	Year
J. Chalton	Principal	1924–1929
A. McClean	Principal	1938–1945
Hla Ohn	Dean & Rector	1946–1964
Aung Thein	Dean	1946–1954
Than Tun	Dean & Rector	1958–1980

== Rectors ==
Yezin (1973–present)

Sr	Rector	Year
1	Dr. Kyaw Zin	1980–1983
2	Dr. Salai Tun Than	1983–1984
3	Mya Nyunt	1985–1991
4	Tin Naing	1992–1994
5	Dr. Kyaw Than	1995–2006
6	Dr. Myint Thaung	2006–2011
7	Dr. Tin Htut	2011–2014
8	Dr. Myo Kywe	2014–2018
8	Dr. Nang Hseng Hom	2018-2025
9	Dr. Theingi Myint	2025–Present

== Administrative organization ==
The supervision of the YAU and its policies and affairs are carried out by the administrative and academic body of the university. All actions of these bodies are subject to the final approval by the Ministry of Agriculture, Livestock and Irrigation, the Ministry of Education, the Central Academic Council, the Central Administrative Council of the Universities, and Colleges of the Republic of the Union of Myanmar. University affairs are administered by the rector and two pro-rectors with the assistance of the academic and administrative body of the university. The professional staff members of the university consist of one rector and two pro-rectors with an academic and administrative staff of over 600 supporting team. The affairs of YAU's outreached campuses are administered by the principals under the control of the rector and pro-rectors of YAU.

== Campus facilities and associations ==
YAU is situated on a campus with a total area of 360 acres.

Yezin Agricultural University has residential facilities for all students. Yezin Campus has nine hostels with 1014 rooms, housing over 2000 students. Students can reach any buildings, including their classrooms, by walking. Each dormitory is equipped with wireless Internet access.

There are variety of student associations of common interest; examples are: Literature and Culture Subcommittees of the National Races, Fine Arts Association, Religious Association, Regional Families, English Speaking Club, Agronomy Society, Floriculture Association, Soil Science Association, Yezin Agricultural University Information Technology Association, and Sports and Gymnastics Club.

=== List of YAU campuses ===
Sr	Campus
1	Aungpan Campus
2	Hmawbi Campus
3	Hlegu Campus
4	Kyaukse Campus
5	Magway Campus
6	Mawlamyine Campus
7	Phyu Campus
8	Yezin Campus (main)
