= Panglong, Northern Shan State =

Panglong
- Town
- Location within Myanmar
- Coordinates: 22°48′0″N 97°22′0″E
- Country: Burma
- State: Shan State
- District: Kyaukme District
- Township: Namtu Township
- Elevation: 2,769 ft (844 m)
- Time zone: UTC+6:30 (MMT)

Panglong is a town in Namtu Township, Kyaukme District in northern Shan State, Burma. It is a ruby mining town.
