= Yezin =

Human settlement in Myanmar

Coordinates: 19°50′03″N 96°16′20″E

Yezin is a university village located beside the Yangon-Mandalay Road. The village of Yezin (Burmese: ရေဇင်း), 12 miles far from north-east of Pyinmana, Burma, has been the site of national scientific research institutions since the late 1970s, when the Forest Research Institute (FRI) was established. Soon after the FRI was established, other institutions followed the suit and the place became an academic hub for Forestry, Agriculture and Veterinary. It is located within Naypyidaw Municipal area. Because of the universities and research institutes, the village is famous as the university village. Yezin became a well known academic center long before Nay Pyi Taw was established and became the capital in 2005. Yezin has a dam and it is called Yezin dam. People around Pyinmana used to visit to the dam.

Although it is a small village, there are three universities in Yezin:

- Yezin Agricultural University (YAU)
- University of Forestry
- Yezin University of Veterinary Science

There are two research institutes:

- Department of Agricultural Research (DAR)
- Forest Research Institute (FRI)

In addition to these research institutions, the Southeast Asia Biodiversity Research Institute (SEABRI) was unveiled in 2016 within the FRI campus. It is a joint initiative between the Chinese Academy of Sciences and Forest Research Institute. It is a regional research institution with its research works focusing on flora and fauna, both aquatic and terrestrial, in the region. Up to date, SEABRI has discovered some new flora and fauna species in Myanmar.
