= Government Technical Institute (Mawlamyine) =

Higher education institute in Mon State, Myanmar

- အစိုးရစက်မှုလက်မှုသိပ္ပံ (မော်လမြိုင်)
- Type: Public
- Established: 2014; 12 years ago
- Affiliations: Ministry of Education
- Principal: U Aung Moe, Dr Cho Yu Mon, Dr Min Min Tun
- Students: about 600
- Location: Mawlamyine, Mon State, Myanmar; 16°29′20.12″N 97°40′32.62″E
- Website: gtimlm.ml

The Government Technical Institute, Mawlamyine (Burmese: အစိုးရစက်မှုလက်မှုသိပ္ပံ (မော်လမြိုင်)) is an Institute of technology and engineering located in Mawlamyine, Mon State, Burma. It can graduate only Diploma of Technical.

== History ==
In 2014 December, Government Technical Institute (Mawlamyine) was founded by Ministry of Science and Technology. (Not to be confused with the previous Government Technological Institute from another part of Mawlamyine that was later upgraded as Technological University (Mawlamyine)).

== Location ==
GTI Mawlamyine is located at Industrial Quarter, Mawlamyine, that was Computer University (Mawlamyine).

== Departments ==
- Department of Civil Engineering
- Department of Electronic and Communication Engineering
- Department of Electrical Power Engineering
- Department of Mechanical Engineering

== Programs ==
Graduate Program	Degree	year
Diploma of Civil Engineering	A.G.T.I. (Civil)	3 years
Diploma of Electronic and Communication Engineering	A.G.T.I. (EC)	3 years
Diploma of Electrical Power Engineering	A.G.T.I. (EP)	3 years
Diploma of Mechanical Engineering	A.G.T.I. (ME)	3 years

== See also ==
- List of universities in Myanmar
- Yenangyaung Government Technical Institute
