= Panglong University =

University in Panglong, Myanmar

- ပင်လုံ တက္ကသိုလ်
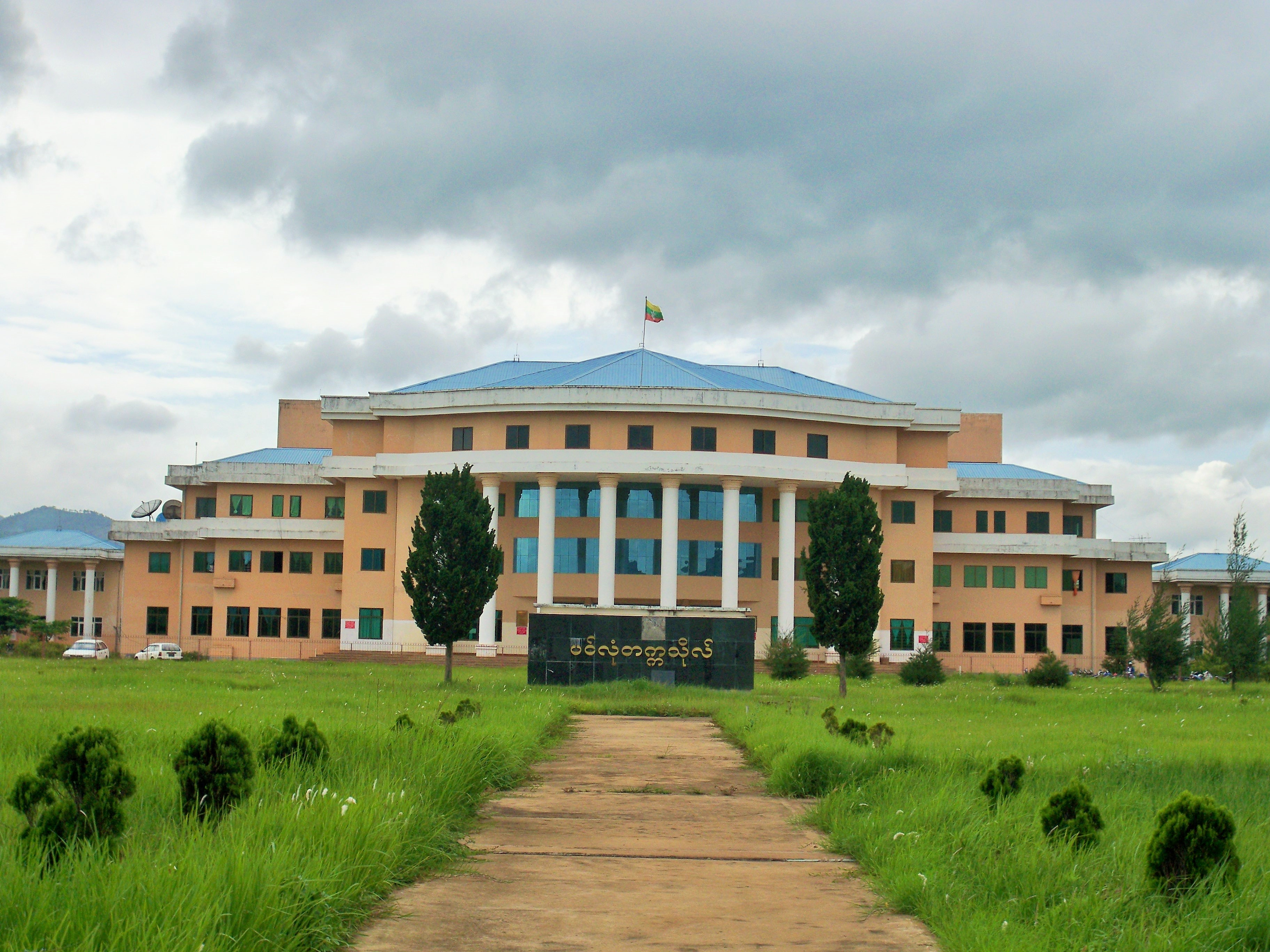
- Type: Public
- Established: 15 February 2002; 24 years ago
- Rector: Ni Ni Aung (Action)
- Total staff: 300
- Students: 10,000
- Location: Panglong, Southern Shan State, Myanmar; 20°45′19″N 97°3′3″E
- Website: www.upanglong.edu.mm

Panglong University (Burmese: ပင်လုံ တက္ကသိုလ်) is a public university in Panglong, Southern Shan State, Myanmar. It is aimed at improving education in Southern Shan State. It was opened in 2002. Panglong Town is a well known member of the Panglong Agreement. The university now offers mainly undergraduate and postgraduate (bachelor's, master's and doctorate) degree programmes in education, sciences and law. The university is composed of the major faculties such as Bachelor of Arts: English, history, geology, law, geography and Bachelor of Science: mathematics, zoology, botany, physics, chemistry. There are more than 1,000 students who have graduated from the university. In 2017 this university distance education offers mainly undergraduate and postgraduate (bachelor's) degree programmes in Education, B.A, B.Sc., L.L.B. The university of distance Education of the major faculties such as a Bachelor of Art: Myanmar, English studies, geography, history, Oriental studies and Bachelor of Science: mathematics, botany, zoology, physics, chemistry.

== Programs ==
Panglong University's main offerings are Bachelor of Arts and Bachelor of Science degrees although it reportedly also offers some master's and doctorate level degrees. Panglong University offers undergraduate and postgraduate degree programmes. The undergraduate programmes are subdivided into three categories: Arts (B.A.), Sciences (B.Sc.), and Law (LL.B). The choice of different fields of learning takes place in school where students choose particular subjects directed towards their tertiary education.

Program	Bachelor's	Master's
Botany	BSc	MSc
Chemistry	BSc	MSc
English studies	BA	MA
Geography	BA	MA
Geology	BSc	MSc
History	BA	MA
Law	LLB	LLM
Mathematics	BSc	MSc
Myanmar	BA	MA
Oriental Studies	BA	MA
Philosophy	BA	MA
Physics	BSc	MSc
Psychology	BA	MA
Zoology	BSc	MSc

== Main departments ==
1. Department of Botany
2. Department of Chemistry
3. Department of English
4. Department of Geography
5. Department of Geology
6. Department of History
7. Department of Law
8. Department of Mathematics
9. Department of Myanmar
10. Department of Oriental Studies
11. Department of Philosophy
12. Department of Physics
13. Department of Psychology
14. Department of Zoology

Each department offers an undergraduate degree programme. The Department of International Relations offers two: the Bachelor of Arts (International Relations) and the Bachelor of Arts (Political Science).

== Leadership ==
The university is headed by a rector.

- Dr Htay Aung
- Dr Nwe Nwe Yin
- Dr May Yi Thein
- Dr Khin Lay Nwe
- Dr Ni Ni Aung
