= Computer University, Hpa-An =

University in Kayin State, Myanmar

Coordinates: 16°50′11.8″N 97°35′46.9″E

- ကွန်ပျူတာတက္ကသိုလ် (ဘားအံ)
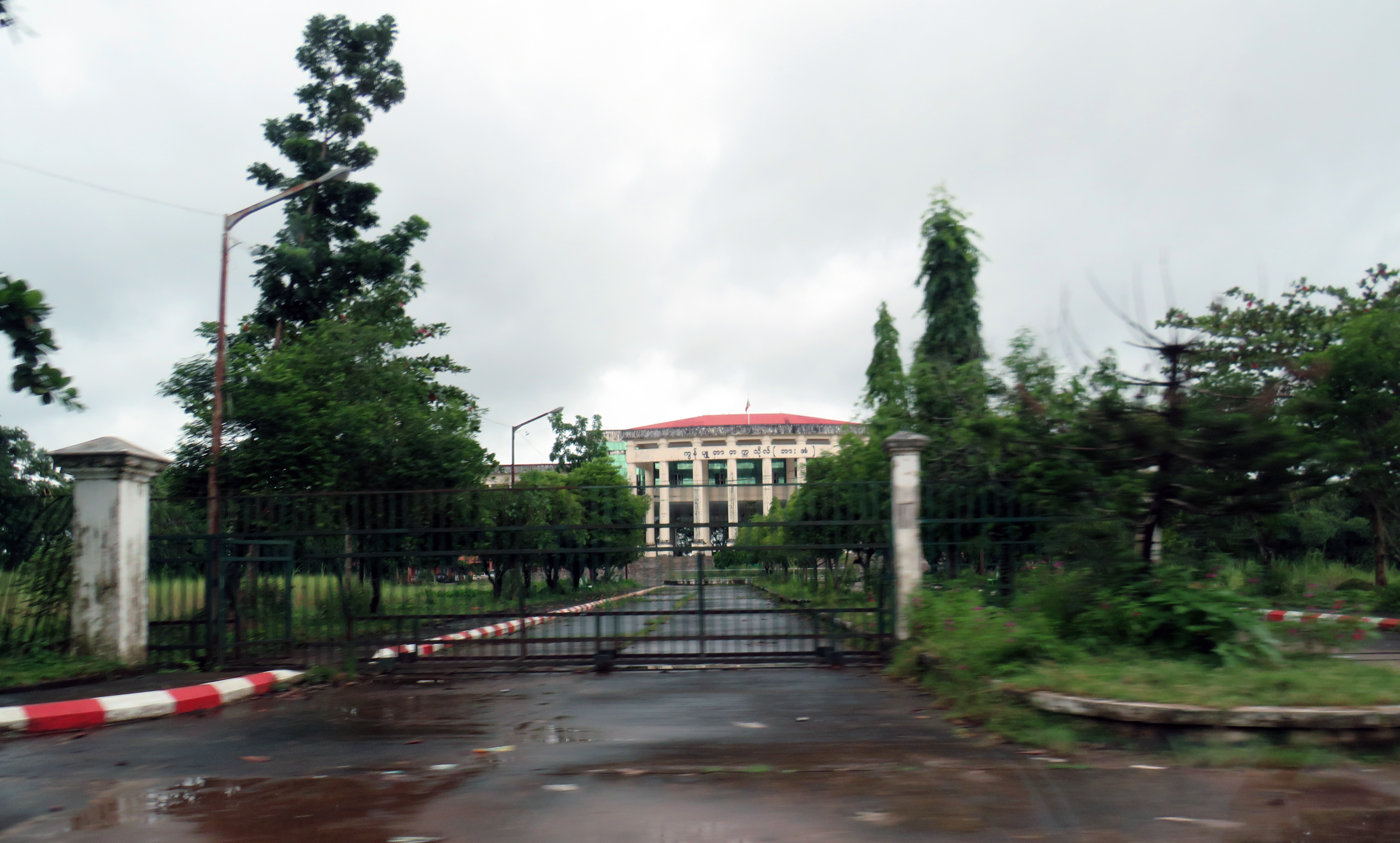
- Type: Public
- Established: 3 September 2001; 25 years ago
- Affiliations: University of Computer Studies, Yangon
- Officer in charge: Government of Myanmar
- Rector: Dr. Nyein Aye
- Location: Hpa-An, Karen State, Myanmar
- Website: cuhpn.moe-st.gov.mm

Computer University, Hpa-An (Burmese: ကွန်ပျူတာတက္ကသိုလ် (ဘားအံ)) is a public institution of higher learning located on the west bank of Salween River near the city of Hpa-an Township, Kayin State in Myanmar. The university is administered by the Ministry of Science and Technology (Myanmar).

== History ==
Computer University, Hpa-An was formerly opened as Government Computer College (GCC) on 3 September 2001. It was upgraded to university level on 20 January 2007.

== Department ==
- Software Department
- Hardware Department
- Burmese Department
- English Department
- Mathematics Department

== Graduate programs ==
Program	Duration (full-time in years)
Bachelor of Computer Science (B.C.Sc)	3
Bachelor of Computer Technology (B.C.Tech)	3
Bachelor of Computer Science (Hons) (B.C.Sc (Hons))	4
Bachelor of Computer Technology (B.C.Tech(Hons:))	4

== Post Graduate Programs ==
Program	Duration (full-time in years)
Master of Computer Science (M.C.Sc)	2
Master of Computer Technology (M.C.Tech)	2
Master of Information Science (M.I.Sc)	2
Diploma of Computer Science (D.C.Sc)	1

== Undergraduate program ==
Level	Degree	Duration
Basic Computer Application Course	Certificate	8 months
