= University of Computer Studies, Myeik =

University in Myeik, Myanmar

Coordinates: 12°27′52.0″N 98°41′33.5″E

- ကွန်ပျူတာတက္ကသိုလ် (မြိတ်); IPA: [kwənpjùtʰà tɛʔkəθò (mjeɪʔ)]
- Other names: Computer University (Myeik), Myeik Computer University
- Former name: Government Computer College (Myeik)
- Motto: မြန်မှန်တွက်ချက်၊ တိုင်းပြည်တွက်
- Motto in English: Calculate and code in swift and precision, for the sake of our nation
- Type: Public
- Established: 2007
- Rector: Dr. Thandar Win (Deputy)
- Location: Myeik, Taninthayi Region, Myanmar
- Website: www.ucsmyeik.edu.mm

University of Computer Studies (Myeik) (Burmese: ကွန်ပျူတာတက္ကသိုလ် (မြိတ်)), also known as Computer University (Myeik) is a public university in Myeik, Taninthayi Region, Myanmar, offering courses in computer science and information technology. The total area is 25.71 acres (10.40 ha).

== History ==
Government Computer College (Myeik) was opened in the National Solidarity and Development Association Hall in 4 September, 2000. On 20 January 2017, it was upgraded to university level. On 15 May 2012, it was transferred to Shwe-du Village. The university is houses in a three-storey building situated along the Union of Myeik–Tanintharyi Highway.

== Bachelor Degree ==
- BCSc (Bachelor of Computer Science)
- BCTech (Bachelor of Computer Technology)

== See also ==
- list of universities in Burma
- Myeik University
- Technological University, Myeik
