= Computer University, Monywa =

University in Sagaing Region, Myanmar

Coordinates: 22°11′30″N 95°03′39″E

- ကွန်ပျူတာ တက္ကသိုလ် (မုံရွာ)
- Former names: Government Computer College, Monywa
- Type: Public
- Established: 4 September 2000; 25 years ago
- Affiliations: MOE-ST
- Acting Principal (Officer in Charge): Dr Myo Hein Zaw
- Location: Monywa, Sagaing Region, Myanmar
- Website: cumonywa.moe-st.gov.mm

The Computer University, Monywa (Burmese: ကွန်ပျူတာ တက္ကသိုလ် (မုံရွာ) [kʊ̀ɰ̃pjùtà tɛʔkəθò (mòʊɰ̃jwà)]) is a public university in Monywa, Sagaing Region, north-western Myanmar. The Ministry of Science and Technology-run university offers bachelor's, and graduate degree programs in computer science, and computer technology. Students may continue advanced studies at the University of Computer Studies, Yangon in Yangon.

== History ==
The university was founded as the Government Computer College, Monywa in the city of Monywa in September 2000. The college was moved to the present 14-acre (57,000 m^{2}) premises in Monhuyin Saigyidaw village on the outskirts of the city a year later. In April 2006, a new building was opened. In January 2007, the college was "upgraded" to the university level. The university is part of a number of formerly two-year schools that have been upgraded to university level in recent years. The military government, which repeatedly closed down schools and universities in the 1990s, has pursued a policy of dispersing students away from major city centers.

== Programs ==
CU, Monywa offers 5-year bachelor's, and two-year master's degree programs in computer science and computer technology.

Program	Bachelor's	Master's
Computer Science	B.C.Sc.	M.C.Sc.
Computer Technology	B.C.Tech.	M.C.Tech.

== See also ==
- University of Computer Studies, Mandalay
- University of Computer Studies, Yangon
