= Computer University, Thaton =

University in Mon State, Myanmar

Coordinates: 16°53′20.3″N 97°23′10.2″E

University of Computer Studies, (Thaton)
- တက္ကသိုလ်‌‌ ‌ကောန်ပျူတာ(သဓီု)
- Motto: မြန်မှန်တွက်ချက် တိုင်းပြည်တွက်
- Type: Public
- Established: 4 September 2000; 26 years ago
- Affiliations: University of Computer Studies, Yangon
- Rector: Dr. Nilar Thein
- Location: Thaton, Mon State, Myanmar
- Website: www.ucstt.edu.mm

University of Computer Studies, (Thaton) (Mon: တက္ကသိုလ်ကောန်ပျူတာ (သဓီု)Burmese: ကွန်ပျူတာတက္ကသိုလ် (သထုံ) is situated at the fort of the Wondami Hilllock in God village of Thaton Township, Mon State, Myanmar. The university is administered by the Ministry of Science and Technology (Myanmar).

== History ==
Government Computer College (Mawlamyaing) was opened on 4 September 2000 in the compound of Government Technical College (Mawlamyaing) in Mawlamyaing. It was later moved next to Mawlamyaing Industrial Zone in Naung Pin Zate Village Tract of Kyaikmaraw Township. On 20 January 2007, it was upgraded as the Computer University, Mawlamyaing. The university was relocated to Thaton Township on 20 November 2011, when its name was changed to the Computer University (Thaton).

== Programs ==
The university offers five-year bachelor's degree programs in computer science and computer technology.

Program	Bachelor's
Computer Science	B.C.Sc.
Computer Technology	B.C.Tech.
