= Computer University, Pyay =

University in Myanmar

Coordinates: 18°49′22.3″N 95°15′19.9″E

University of Computer Studies, Pyay
- ကွန်ပျူတာတက္ကသိုလ်(ပြည်)
- Motto: ပညာဝေဆာ သီရိခေတ္တရာ
- Established: 2004; 22 years ago
- Rector: Dr. Yuzana
- Location: Pyay, Bago Region, Myanmar
- Website: Official website

The University of Computer Studies, Pyay (Burmese: ကွန်ပျူတာတက္ကသိုလ်(ပြည်)) is a university in Pyay, Bago Region, Myanmar, offering courses in computer science and information technology.

== Background History ==
The government-funded university, with an emphasis is on computer engineering at the undergraduate and graduate levels, was founded in 2004 as a Government Computer College (GCC). During the first year of the GCC, only computer application trainings were offered. Undergraduate student admissions began from 2005. In 2007, Government Computer College (Pyay) became a university named Computer University (Pyay). Its name was changed to University of Computer Studies (Pyay) in 2017. The campus has an area of 17.68 acres and lies to the south of 081/2 milestone on the highway from Pyay to Aunglan.

== Degrees Offered ==
- Bachelor of Computer Science (B.C.Sc.)
- Bachelor of Computer Technology (B.C.Tech.)

== Departments ==
- Faculty of Computer Systems and Technologies (စက်နည်းပညာမဟာဌာန)
- Faculty of Computer Science (ကွန်ပျူတာသိပ္ပံဌာန)
- Faculty of Information Science (သုတသိပ္ပံမဟာဌာန)
- Faculty of Computing (တွက်ချက်ရေးသင်္ချာမဟာဌာန)
- Myanmar Department (မြန်မာစာဌာန)
- English Department (အင်္ဂလိပ်စာဌာန)
- Physics Department (ရူပဗေဒဌာန)
- Application Department (အသုံးချဌာန)
- Library Department (စာကြည့်တိုက်ဌာန)
- Maintenance Department (ပြုပြင်ထိန်းသိမ်းရေးအင်ဂျင်နီယာဌာန)
- Administrative Department (စီမံခန့်ခွဲရေးဌာန)
- Finance Department (ငွေစာရင်းဌာန)
- Student Affair (ကျောင်းသားရေးရာဌာန)

== Courses ==
- First Year Computer Science & Technology
- Second Year Computer Science
- Second Year Computer Technology
- Third Year Computer Science
- Third Year Computer Technology
- Fourth Year Computer Science
- Fourth Year Computer Technology
- Fifth Year Computer Science
- Fifth Year Computer Technology
