= Computer University, Sittwe =

University in Myanmar

Coordinates: 20°07′57.2″N 92°53′25.8″E

University of Computer Studies (Sittway)
- Other name: UCSS
- Established: 1 October 2001; 24 years ago
- Officer in charge: Government of Myanmar
- Location: Sittwe, Rakhine State, Myanmar

University of Computer Studies in Sittway (UCSS) is located in Pyitawthar quarter, Sittwe, Rakhine State, Myanmar. It was formerly opened as Government Computer College on 1 October 2001, and upgraded to university level on 20 January 2007. Professor Dr. Zaw Tun (PhD (IT)) is the principal of the UCSS. In 2018, there were over 300 students at the university.

== Department ==
- Faculty of Computer Systems and Technologies
- Faculty of Computer Science
- Faculty of Information Science
- Faculty of Computing
- Department of Languages
- Department of Natural Science
- Department of Information Technology Support and Maintenance

== Programs ==
Program	Bachelor's	Master's	Doctorate
Computer Science	B.C.Sc.	None	None
Computer Technology	B.C.Tech.	None	None
Applied Science	None	None	None
Information Science	None	None	None
