= Computer University, Magway =

University in Magway, Myanmar

Coordinates: 20°07′33.7″N 94°59′43.1″E

University of Computer Studies (Magway)
- ကွန်ပျူတာတက္ကသိုလ် (မကွေး)
- Motto: မြန်မှန်တွက်ချက် တိုင်းပြည်တွက်
- Established: 2000
- Location: Magway, Myanmar
- Colors: Yellow
- Website: lms.ucsmgy.edu.mm

University of Computer Studies (Magway) (Burmese: ကွန်ပျူတာတက္ကသိုလ် (မကွေး), pronounced [kʊ̀ɰ̃pjùtà tɛʔkəθò (məɡwé)]) is a university located in Magway, Myanmar.

== Location ==
The university was initially located in Ayemyathaya village, and was moved to a new campus near Magyikan village on the Magway-Taungdwingyi Road in the 2012–2013 academic year. The university, administered by the Ministry of Education, offers undergraduate and master degree programs in computer science and technology.

== Programs ==
The university offers three-year bachelor's and four-year bachelor's (honors) degree programs. Starting in the 2012–2013 academic year, all bachelor's degree programs will take four years to complete. And from the 2012–2013 academic year, it is started 5 years studying for bachelor's degree.

Program	Bachelor's	Master's	Doctorate
Computer Science	B.C.Sc.	M.C.Sc	None
Computer Technology	B.C.Tech.	M.C.Tech.	None
Applied Science	None	None	None
Information Science	None	None	None

== Curriculum ==
=== First Year ===
- First Semester: Burmese, English, Physics, 101, 102, 103, 104
- Second Semester: Burmese, English, Physics, 101, 102, 103, 104

=== Second Year ===
- First Semester: English, 201, 202, 203, 204, 205, 206
- Second Semester: English, 201, 202, 203, 204, 205, 206

=== Third Year ===
- First Semester: English, 301, 302, 303, 304, 305, 306
- Second Semester: English, 301, 302, 303, 304, 305, 306

=== Fourth Year ===
- First Semester: English, 401, 402, 403, 404, 405, 406
- Second Semester: English, 401, 402, 403, 404, 405, 406

=== Fifth Year ===
- First Semester: English, 501, 502, 503, 504, 505
- Second Semester: English, 502, 503, project

== Faculty ==
=== Teaching departments ===
- Faculty of Computing
- Faculty of Computer Systems and Technologies
- Faculty of Information Science
- Faculty of Computer Science
- Department of Information Technology Supporting and Maintenance
- Department of Language
- Department of Natural Science
