= University of Computer Studies (Taungoo) =

University in Taungoo, Myanmar

Coordinates: 18°58′30.6″N 96°24′58.9″E

University of Computer Studies, Taungoo (UCST)
- ကွန်ပျူတာတက္ကသိုလ် (တောင်ငူ)
- University of Computer Studies (Taungoo)
- Motto: မင်္ဂလာပါ ဓမ္မမိတ်ဆွေ
- Established: 4 September 2000; 26 years ago
- Rector: Dr. Ei Ei Hlaing
- Location: Taungoo, Bago Region, Myanmar
- Website: www.ucstaungoo.edu.mm

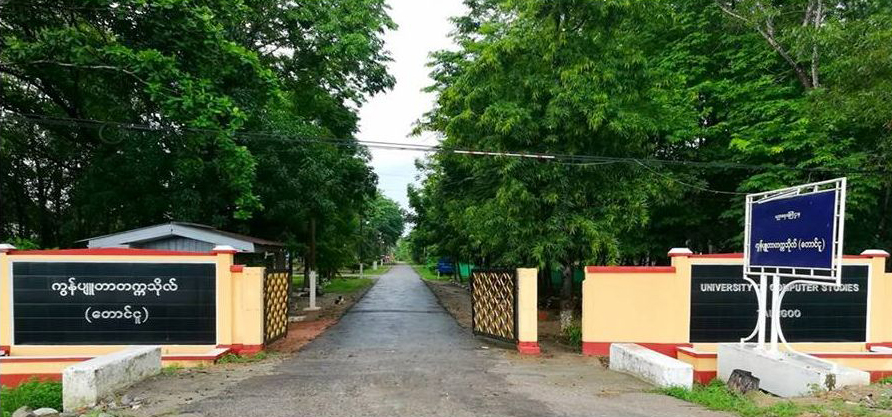
Entrance of the University of Computer Studies (Taungoo)

University of Computer Studies, Taungoo is located at Taungoo, Bago Division, Myanmar. It was formerly known as Government Computer College, Taungoo. Computer University (Taung-Ngu) was first opened on 4 September 2000 as a College in Katumati Myo Thit, Taung-Ngu. On 20 January 2007, it was upgraded to university level and transferred to the campus of Technology University (Taung-Ngu) in Kanyo village.

== Faculties ==
- Department of Myanmar
- Department of English
- Computer Software Technology Department
- Computer Hardware Technology Department
- Information Science Department
- Computer Application Department
- Cisco Lab
- Computer Lab
- Embedded Lab
- Hardware Lab
- Network Lab
- Research Lab
- Virtualization Lab
- Language Lab
- Physics Lab
- International Relations Office
- Faculty of Computer Science (FCS)
- Faculty of Information Science (FIS)
- Information Technologies Support and Maintenance (ITSM)
- Faculty of Computer System and Technologies (FCST)
- Faculty of Computing (FC)
- Department of Language
- Department of Natural Science
- Department of Administration
- Department of Finance
- Department of Student Affairs

== Degree Programs ==
The University of Computer Studies, Taungoo offers the following degree programs :

- Graduate Programs

No	Graduate Program	Degree	Duration
1	Bachelor of Computer Science	(B.C.Sc.)	5 Yrs
2	Bachelor of Computer Technology	(B.C.Tech.)	5 Yrs
3	Master of Computer Science	(M.C.Sc)
