= Computer University, Meiktila =

University in Mandalay Division, Myanmar

Coordinates: 20°52′16.9″N 95°55′17.6″E

University of Computer Studies, Meiktila
- မိတ္ထီလာကွန်ပျူတာတက္ကသိုလ်
- Motto: မြန်မှန်တွက်ချက် တိုင်းပြည်တွက်
- Type: Public
- Established: 2001; 25 years ago
- Affiliations: SOI Asia, MOE-ST
- Rector: Dr. Hlaing Phyu Phyu Mon
- Location: Meiktila, Myanmar
- Colors: Turquoise
- Website: website

University of Computer Studies, Meiktila, commonly known as UCSMTLA, has been producing graduates in computer sciences and technology majors called CS and CT. UCSMTLA is located in Meiktila (sometimes called Meikhtila), Mandalay Division, Myanmar.

== History ==
In October 2001, UCS-Mtla was established as a Government Computer College (GCC). In January 2007, it was promoted from GCC to University of Computer Studies (Meiktila).

== Rule ==
The students who gets over 400 marks (may be little different for each year) in total of matriculation exams are allowed to attend this university. The students have to wear the uniform in the colour of white and greenish blue. The students can take either computer science or technology majors depending on their preferences. Only the students who have over 75% of total attendance of current academic year are allowed to take their corresponding exam.

== Programs ==
Computer University, Meiktila offers five-year bachelor's degree programs in computer science and computer technology. The school's language of instruction is English.

Program	Bachelor's
Computer Science	B.C.Sc.
Computer Technology	B.C.Tech.
