= Computer University, Myitkyina =

University in Kachin State, Myanmar

Coordinates: 25°22′21.5″N 97°24′11.8″E

The Computer University, Myitkyina is situated in No. 21/23 between ZawJun and Taryoe street in the Shansu (south) quarter, in Myitkyina, the capital city of Kachin State in Myanmar. On 20 January 2007 (19 years ago), Government Computer College (Myitkyina) was upgraded to the Computer University (Myitkyina).

== Program ==
Post Graduate

Level	Degree	Duration
Bachelor of Computer Science (Honors),	(B.C.Sc) (Hons:)	4 yrs
Bachelor of Computer Technology (Honors)	(B.C.Tech) (Hons:)	4 yrs
Master of Computer Science	(M.C.Sc)	5 yrs
Master of Computer Technology	(M.C.Tech)	5 yrs

== Post Graduate Diploma ==
Level	Degree	Duration
Post Graduate Computer Science Diploma	(D.C.Sc)	1 year

== Graduate Degree ==
Level	Degree	Duration
Bachelor of Computer Science	(B.C.Sc)	3 yrs
Bachelor of Computer Technology	(B.C.Tech)	3 yrs

== Undergraduate program ==
Level	Degree	Duration
Basic Computer Application Course	Certificate	8 months

== Department ==
- Software Department and its responsibilities
- Hardware Department and its responsibilities
- Myanmar Department and its responsibilities
- English Department and its responsibilities
