= University of Veterinary Science, Yezin =

Higher education institute in Naypyidaw, Myanmar

Coordinates: 19.8407°N 96.2741°E

- မွေးမြူရေးဆိုင်ရာ ဆေးတက္ကသိုလ်(ရေဆင်း)
- Motto: မွေးမြူဆေးကု တိုင်းပြည်ပြု
- Type: Public
- Established: 1957; 69 years ago
- Affiliations: Ministry of Livestock, Fisheries and Rural Development
- Rector: Dr. Mar Mar Win
- Location: Yezin, Naypyidaw 05282; Myanmar
- Website: www.uvs.edu.mm

The University of Veterinary Science, Yezin (Burmese: မွေးမြူရေးဆိုင်ရာဆေးတက္ကသိုလ်(ရေဆင်း) [mwémjùjé sʰàɪɰ̃jà sʰé tɛʔkəθò (jèzɪ́ɰ̃)]), located in Yezin in the outskirts of Naypyidaw, is the only university of veterinary science in Myanmar (formerly Burma). The university offers a six-year Bachelor of Veterinary Science (BVSc) program. In 2014, UVS renamed its BVSc degree (UK format) to DVM (Doctor of Veterinary Medicine: USA format) and, since then, all new graduates received DVM title instead. It accepts about 100 students a year. It launched a four-year Bachelor of Animal Science (BASc) program in 2014. It accepts about 100 students a year. It also offers graduate (PhD, MPhil, MVM and MVSc) degree programs. The medium of instruction at UVS is English.

== History ==
Veterinary science education in Myanmar began in 1890 during the British colonial rule when the Veterinary Assistant Training School was opened at Shan Road in Kyimyindaing, Yangon. The school offered a two-year program, and senior veterinary officer Bhattiwallah was its first principal. In 1920, the school was upgraded, and the faculty was expanded by 12 veterinary inspectors and five veterinary superintendents, all non-Burmese. In 1923, the first Burmese veterinarian, Pe Than, a graduate of Bengal Veterinary College, was appointed a vet superintendent at the school. In February 1925, Governor Sir Harcourt Butler laid the foundation stone for the construction of the school's new building in Insein that would later bear his name. By 1931, the original two-year program had been extended to three years.

In 1957, the Veterinary College, a Faculty of Rangoon University was established at the Insein campus. The school's four-year BSc (Veterinary) program accepted university students who passed Intermediate Science Part II with distinctions in zoology, chemistry and physics. In 1964, the college became the Institute of Animal Husbandry and Veterinary Science (IAHVS) (တိရိစ္ဆာန်မွေးမြူရေးနှင့်ဆေးကုသရေးတက္ကသိုလ် [təɹeɪʔsʰàɰ̃ mwémjùjé n̥ɪ̰ɰ̃ sʰé kṵθa̰jé tɛʔkəθò]), under the Ministry of Education, offering a six-year BVSc program. From 1957 to 1975, the two-year vet assistant program at the Veterinary Assistant Training School and the bachelor's degree program at the IAHVS were concurrently offered by two different government ministries. In 1981, the IAHVS was relocated to Yezin, Pyinmana (now part of Naypyidaw). In October 1999, the institute's name was formally changed to the present name in both English and Burmese.

During the 1990s, the UVS like most universities in the country was repeatedly closed by the military government fearing of student unrest. On 31 December 1994, the institute came under the administration of the Ministry of Livestock and Fisheries.

The university began offering postgraduate courses for MPhil in 1988, MVSc and MSc programs in 1992, and three-year doctoral (PhD) programs in 2007. The government has sent some of the faculty to the Universiti Putra Malaysia for doctoral studies. The total number of graduates at the university between 1957 and 2012 was 4409.

The Japanese government has sponsored two to three Burmese veterinarians for MSc and PhD courses each year since 2000. A new generation of foreign trained veterinarians has begun to take over the teaching roles at the UVS, with some of them as departmental head and/or professors. Some staff from UVS were also supported by German Academic Exchange (Deutscher Akademisher Austauschdienst, DAAD). More members of staff received scholarships from DAAD.

== Departments ==
The University of Veterinary Science comprises a rector's office and 26 departments:

- Rector's Office
- Department of Myanmarsar
- Department of English
- Department of Mathematics
- Department of Physics
- Department of Chemistry
- Department of Zoology
- Department of Botany
- Department of Anatomy
- Department of Physiology and Biochemistry
- Department of Pathology and Microbiology
- Department of Pharmacology and Parasitology
- Department of Surgery and Theriogenology
- Department of Medicine
- Department of Animal Science
- Department of Veterinary Public Health
- Department of Animal Nutrition
- Department of Aquaculture and Aquatic Diseases
- Department of Genetics and Animal Breeding
- Veterinary Teaching Hospital
- Demonstration Farms
- Department of International Relation and Information Technology
- Library
- Department of Account
- Department of Training and Students' Affairs
- Department of Engineering

== Notable alumni and faculty ==
- Dr. Khyne U Mar: elephant veterinarian and author; co-founder of an elephant care and research center
- Professor Dr. Kyaw Sunn: winner of 2005 Research Award of the Association of Asian Veterinary Schools
- Professor Dr. Myint Thein (former rector): Director General; winner of 2004 Research Award of the Association of Asian Veterinary Schools
