= University of Computer Studies (Maubin) =

University in Myanmar

- ကွန်ပျူတာတက္ကသိုလ်(မအူပင်)
- Other name: UCSMUB
- Former names: Government Computer College (Maubin) (2003–2007); University of Computer Studies (Maubin) (2007–2015)
- Motto: မြန်မှန်တွက်ချက် တိုင်းပြည်တွက်
- Type: Public
- Established: 2003; 23 years ago as Government Computer College (Maubin); 2007; 19 years ago as University of Computer Studies (Maubin)
- Affiliations: Ministry of Education
- Rector: Thandar Thein
- Administrative staff: 87 (academic and administrative)
- Location: Between Block 1 and Block 2, Sein Mya Kan Thar Road, Maubin, Ayeyarwaddy Region, Myanmar; 16°44′28.1″N 95°39′05.1″E
- Campus: Urban
- Language: Burmese language, English
- Colours: Turquoise
- Website: ucsmub.edu.mm

University of Computer Studies (Maubin) (Burmese: ကွန်ပျူတာတက္ကသိုလ်(မအူပင်) Burmese pronunciation: [kʊ̀ɰ̃pjùtà tɛʔkəθò (məʔùbɪ̀ɰ̃)]) is located in Maubin Township, about 100 km (62 mi) west of Yangon, Myanmar. It is one of three computer universities in Ayeyarwady Region, which provides education in the area of ICT. The university offers both computer science and computer technology to its undergraduate students. The university's campus has an area of 53.872 acres (21.801 ha) and is situated between Ward 1 and 2, on Sein Mya Kan Thar Street, Maubin, Ayeyarwady Region, Myanmar.

== History ==
Government Computer College (Maubin) started on January 1, 2003. It was upgraded to Computer University (Maubin) on January 20, 2007. In 2015, It was renamed as University of Computer Studies (Maubin).

== Degree programs ==
University of Computer Studies (Maubin) offers five-year bachelor's degree programs in computer science and computer technology.

No	Program	Bachelor's	Duration
1	Computer Science	B.C.Sc.	5 Years
2	Computer Technology	B.C.Tech.	5 Years

== Faculties and staff ==
=== Rector ===
Professor Dr.Thandar Thein

Ph.D.(IT)

=== Academic ===
1. Faculty of Computer Science
2. Faculty of Computer Systems and Technologies
3. Faculty of Information Science
4. Faculty of Computing
5. Department of Information Technology Supporting & Maintenance
  - Department of Application
  - Network Design & Maintenance
6. Department of Languages
  - Department of Myanmar
  - Department of English
7. Department of Natural Science (Physics)

=== Administration ===
1. Department of Student Affairs
2. Department of Staff Affairs
3. Department of Finance
4. Department of Estate Engineering

== Rectors/principals ==
Rectors/Principals of UCSMUB
No	Name	Role	Active (MM/YYY)
1	Daw Moe Moe Win	Principal	01/2003 - 11/2003
2	Daw Tar Tar Khin	Principal	11/2003 - 09/2004
3	Dr. Mie Mie Su Thwin	Principal	09/2004 - 10/2005
4	Dr. Thin Thin Htike	Principal	10/2005 - 05/2006
5	Dr. Hla Myat Kaung	Principal	05/2006 - 07/2008
6	Dr. Hinn Min Oo	Principal	08/2008 - 07/2010
7	Dr. Thae Nu Phyu	Principal	07/2010 - 01/2013
8	Dr. Khaing Khaing Oo	Principal	01/2013 - 04/2015
9	Dr. Thandar Thein	Rector	02/2015–Present

== Student life ==
Logo of UCSMUB Students' Union

=== Students' union ===
In 2019, the students' union is officially established, which is called UCSMUB Students' Union.

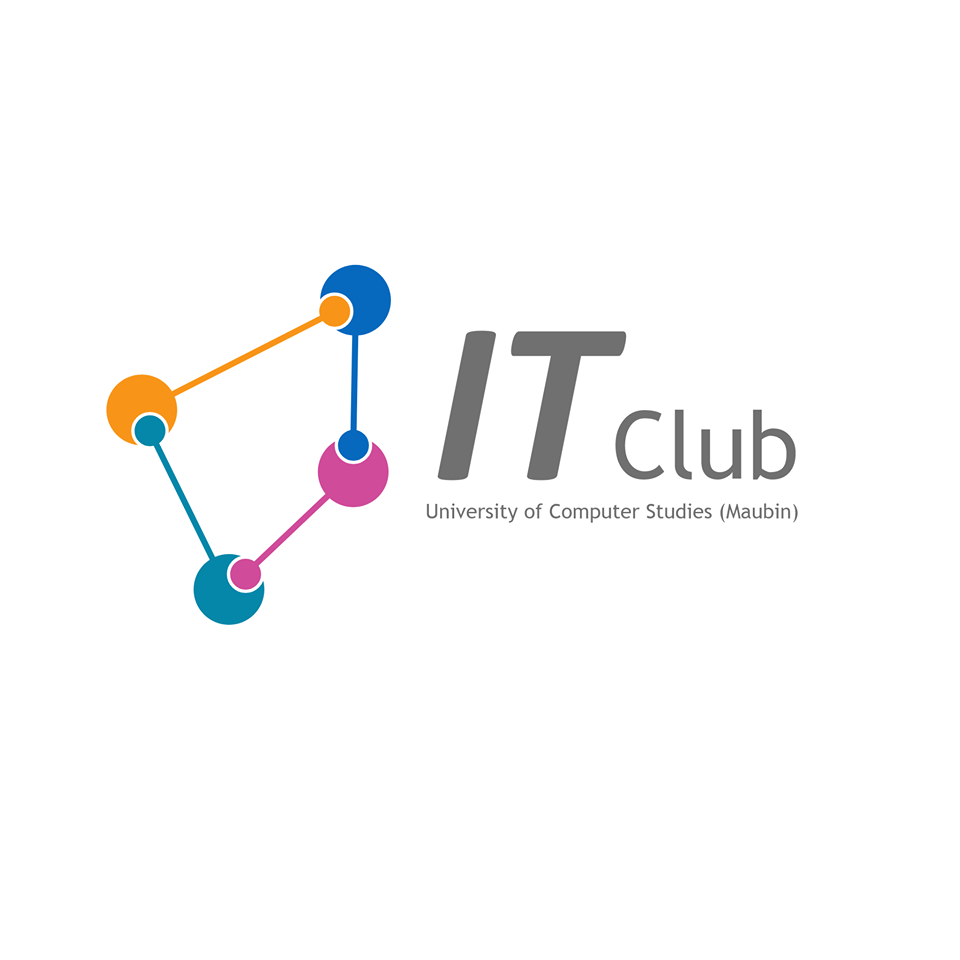
Logo of IT Club UCSMUB

=== Student associations/clubs ===
During the 2017–2018 academic year, IT Club was founded with the support of professors and teachers, and it was recognized by the rector of the university. And it is known as IT Club UCSMUB.

Music Club, Dance Club, Handmade Club, and E-Sport Club are established as students' clubs by the students' union.

=== Product show ===
On February 22, 2019, the Product show at the university was held. Students showed 41 products in total. "Information System of Private Hospital", "Trip Advisor" and "Garden System" won the first, second, third prize respectively in the product show. "Smart Restaurant", "APineKine" and "Smart Township System" won the consolation prizes.
