= University of Computer Studies, Kalay =

University in Myanmar

Coordinates: 23°14′44.4″N 94°09′16.5″E

The University of Computer Studies, Kalay (UCSK) (Burmese: ကလေး ကွန်ပျူတာ တက္ကသိုလ်), is an public IT and computer science university of Myanmar. The university offers bachelor's and master's programs in computer science and technology. It was opened on 27 September 2001 (24 years ago) as Government Computer College (GCC). It was upgraded to Computer University on 20 January 2007. The 38.6-acre UCSK campus is located 10 miles from Kalaymyo, Sagaing Region and 14 miles from Kalewa, near Ayethayar village.

== Objectives ==
- To produce more experts who have the practical ability to invent, install, repair, experiment with, and apply computer hardware and software with a view to making Myanmar a modern and developed nation.
- To foster the outstanding products of the University to become high caliber experts.
- To conduct research contributing to the welfare of the nation and to carry out research and development activities on Information Technology utilizing the high caliber experts.
- To make the use of computer proliferate all over the country.

== Department ==
- Software Department
- Hardware Department
- Information Science Department
- Application Department
- English Department
- Physics Department
- Myanmar Department
- Mathematics Department
- Cloud Computing Department

== Programs ==
- Graduate Programs
- Post Graduate Programs
- Under Graduate Programs

No	Post Graduate Program	Degree	Duration
1	Bachelor of Computer Science (Honors)	(B.C.Sc) (Hons:)	4 Yrs
2	Bachelor of Computer Technology (Honors)	(B.C.Tech) (Hons:)	4 Yrs
3	Master of Computer Science	M.C.Sc	5 Yrs
4	Master of Computer Technology	M.C.Tech	5 rs

No	Post Graduate Diploma Program	Degree	Duration
1	Post Graduate Computer Science Diploma	(D.C.Sc)	1 Yrs
2	Diploma in Computer Maintenance	(D.C.M)	1 Yrs
3	Diploma in Diploma in Computer Application	(D.C.A)	1 Yrs

No	Graduate Program	Degree	Duration
1	Bachelor of Computer Science	(B.C.Sc)	3 Yrs
2	Bachelor of Computer Technology	(B.C.Tech)	3 Yrs

No	UnderGraduate Program	Degree	Duration
1	Basic Computer Application Course	Certificate	8 mos
