= University of Computer Studies (Pakokku) =

University in Pakokku, Myanmar

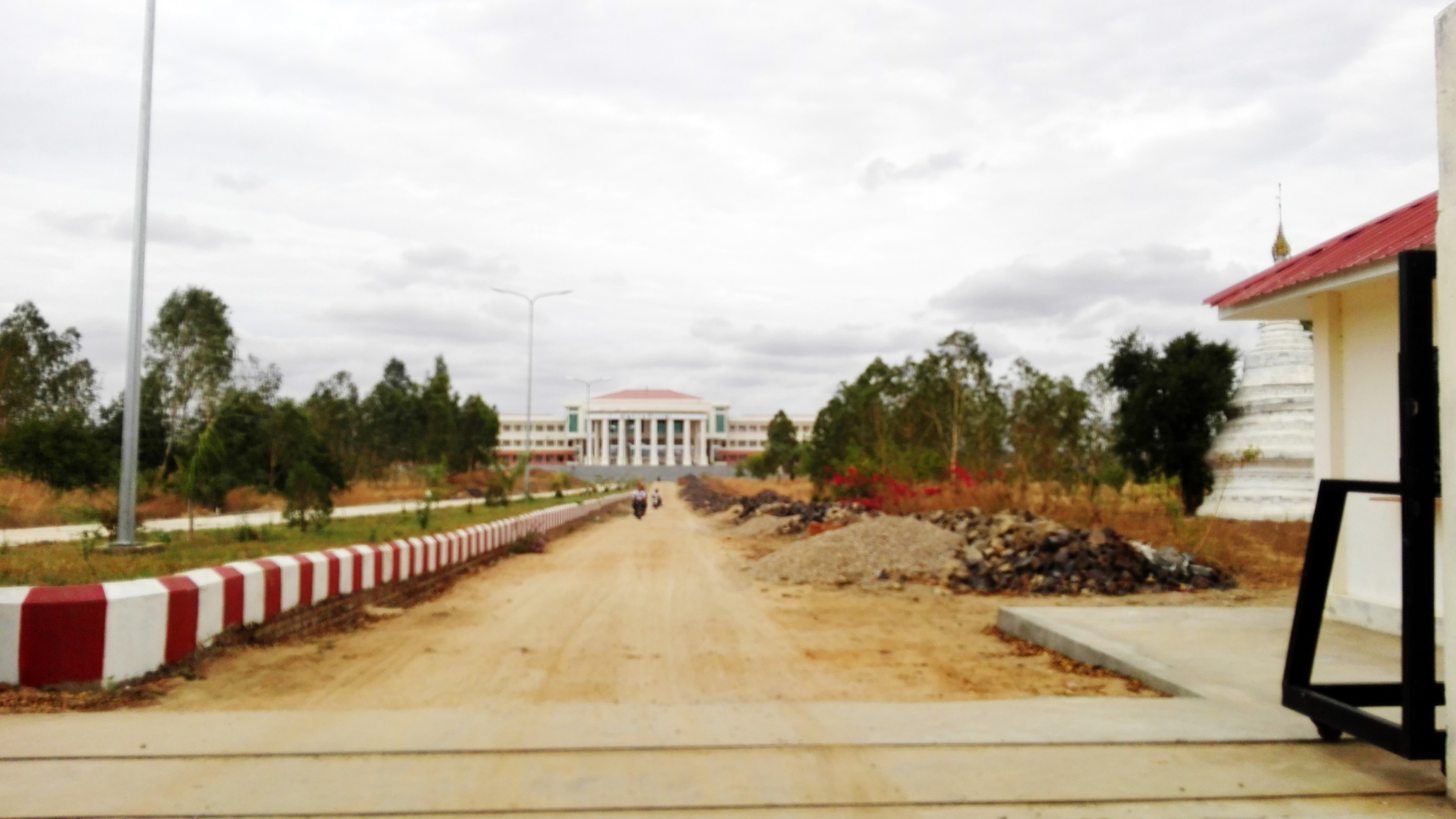
- University entrance
- Former names: Computer University (Pakokku); Government Computer College (Pakokku)
- Motto: မြန်မှန်တွက်ချက် တိုင်းပြည်တွက်
- Type: Public undergraduate university
- Established: 21 January 2002; 24 years ago
- Principal: Dr. Tin Tin Thein
- Location: Pakokku, Magway Region, Myanmar; 21.3327°N 94.9858°E
- Language: Burmese; English
- Colors: Light blue, white
- Website: www.ucspkku.edu.mm

University of Computer Studies (Pakokku) (formerly Computer University (Pakokku), Government Computer College (Pakokku)) is a public undergraduate university located in Pakokku, Magway Region, Myanmar. Students study various computer disciplines, including hardware, networking, programming, imaging, and artificial intelligence. Its uniform is white for upper wear and light blue for longyi.

== History ==
Government Computer College (Pakokku) was established on 21 January 2002. It was upgraded to Computer University (Pakokku) on 20 January 2007 and was later renamed University of Computer Studies (Pakokku).

== Degrees ==
The university offers five-year Bachelor of Computer Science (B.C.Sc) and Bachelor of Computer Technology (B.C.Tech) degree programs.

== Departments ==
Academics are divided into the following departments:

- Faculty of Computer Science
- Faculty of Computer Systems and Technologies
- Faculty of Information Science
- Faculty of Computing
- Department of Information Technology Supporting & Maintenance
- Department of Natural Science
- Department of Languages
- Library

== Practical rooms ==
The University has practical rooms for English language listening and for computer and physics practical works. It has a library with especially computer-related books and journals as well as more general subject matter.

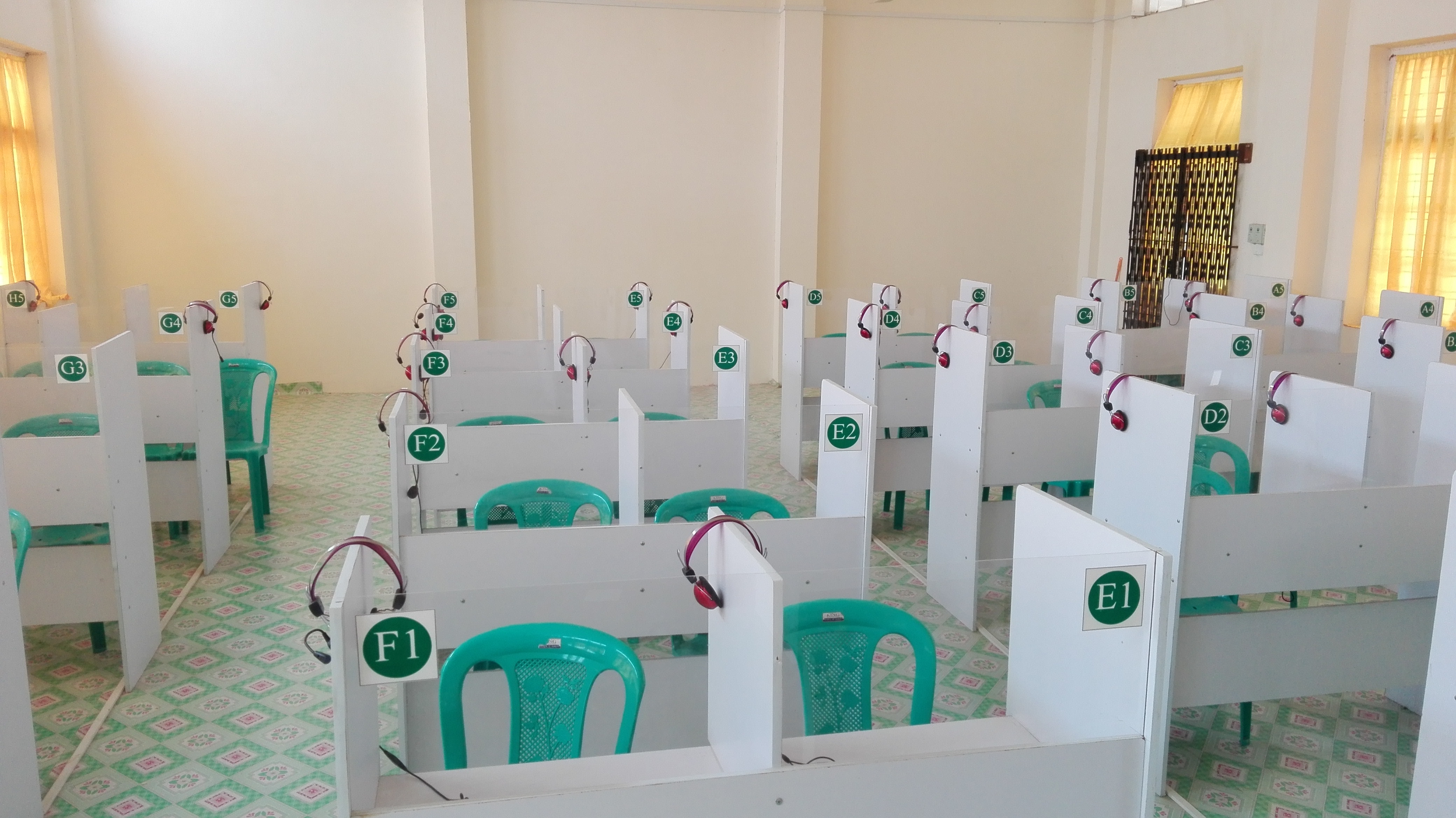
A practical English listening room
