= Green Life =

- အစိမ်းရောင်ဘဝ
- Predecessor: Kyaw Min Oo, Aye Mya Thandar Hlaing, Moh Moh Win, Kyawt Kyawt Maung, Chan Mya Nyein, Myo Myint Myat, and Moe Yu Khine
- Formation: April 8, 2011; 15 years ago
- Founded at: Tabuyin Khwe village, Sagaing Township, Sagaing Region,Myanmar
- Type: Nonprofit organization
- Purpose: environmental conservation and social development
- Headquarters: Sagaing Region, Sagaing Township, Tabuyin Khwe village
- Location: Sagaing Township, Myanmar
- Region served: Sagaing
- Members: 280 members
- Official language: Myanmar, English

Green Life is nonprofit environmental protection and social development group in Myanmar. It was formed by villagers with 48 members in 2011 at Sagaing Region, Sagaing Township, Tabuyin Khwe village.

Now, Green Life's members are 280 youths from the local community. Its headquarter is located in Sagaing Township, Tabuyin Khwe village. In June 2018, the group received an award from State Counsellor of Myanmar Aung San Su Kyi.

== Established summary ==
In 2011, Thumpa Dipa Humanitarian Organisation had given workshop on environmental conservation at Tabuyin Khwe village. After the five-day workshop, Green Life group was formed by the villagers with 48 members. It was originally led by youths and founded on 8 April 2011.

== Award ==
- Worthy of Honor Praise Awards by State Counsellor of Myanmar
