= Tabuyin Khwe =

- Location within Myanmar
- Coordinates: 22°02′59″N 95°40′09.3″E
- Country: Myanmar
- Region: Sagaing Region
- District: Sagaing District
- Township: Sagaing Township
- Village Tract: Tabuyin Khwe

Tabuyin Khwe also Dapeyinkhwe (Burmese: ဒီပဲယင်းကွဲ) is a village located in Sagaing Region, Sagaing Township in Myanmar. Mu River (Mu Myit) is flowing at the western of Tabuyin Khwe village. The village's main source of income is mango cultivation.

== Nature ==
Tabuyin Khwe Village is located in Sagaing Township, Sagaing Region, Myanmar. There are over 800 families in the village. There are five monasteries and one BasicEducation High School. All of the villagers are farmers. A few people are fishermen. As it is located along the Mu River, the villagers can grow crops well. They usually grow all kinds of peas and beans, wheat, and various vegetables. The village's main source of income is mango cultivation.

== Location ==
Tabuyin Khwe Village is a Village of Sagaing Township, Sagaing District, Sagaing Region, Myanmar.
