= Sane (town) =

Sane town စနဲမြို့ Sanae sub-township
- Village
- Location in Myanmar (Burma)
- Coordinates: 19°12′58″N 93°43′59″E
- Country: Myanmar
- Division: Rakhine State
- District: Kyaukphyu District
- Township: Kyaukphyu Township
- Time zone: UTC+6.30 (MMT)

Sane (Burmese: စနဲမြို့; also spelled as Sanai, or Sanae Town) is a town located within Kyaukphyu Township in Rakhine State, Myanmar. It is a strategically important town for the access of Kyaukphyu township as it is 30 miles south of its township. As of 2026, it is controlled by the Arakan Army (AA).

== Incidents ==
In November 2020, around 160 civilians escaped for shelter from Ramree township to Sane town due to conflict between the AA & Myanmar military. On 9 October 2024, four residents of Sane were arrested by the military council. 14 residents were detained by the military council on 24 July 2024, and 7 of them were released on the night of next day.

The town has been repeatedly attacked by the junta. A woman was killed and at least six others were injured when a military council drone dropped eight bombs on the town. About 100 houses in the Shwe Hintha ward of the town were burned down on May 19, 2026. On March 24, the central ward of the town was also hit by drone strikes causing four people to be injured and houses damaged. The town has been bombed for days during late May 2026, forcing 6,000 locals to be displaced and flee the area.

Since May 2026, the junta has launched an offensive to retake the town from Arakan Army. The offensive to capture Sanai included a total of over 400 troops from various Infantry Battalions under the 11th Army Division. Between 28 May to 30 May, fierce fighting broke out and at least 40 junta soldiers were killed, including large amount of weapons were seized by Arakan Army.

== Strategic importance ==
Sane Town is located more than 30 miles south of the Kyaukphyu township capital. Control of Sane and surrounding areas by the junta is assessed as complicating for AA operations towards Kyaukphyu. According to locals and analysts, the junta intends to use Sane as a stepping stone towards future offensives on Ramree and defensive preparations for Kyaukphyu.
