= Battle of Kyaukphyu =

2025 battle in Myanmar

Coordinates: 19°25′N 93°32′E

- Part of Operation 1027 (Rakhine Theatre) in the Myanmar civil war
Date	20 February 2025 – ongoing (1 year, 1 week and 4 days)
Location	Kyaukphyu District, Myanmar

Belligerents
Myanmar: State Administration Council (until July 2025) China (alleged)	Arakan Army

Commanders and leaders
Brigadier General Kyaw Myo Aung †; Lieutenant Colonel Kyaw Lin Kyaing (POW); Lieutenant colonel Soe Htwe †	Twan Mrat Naing; Nyo Twan Awng

Units involved
Tatmadaw: Myanmar Army; Myanmar Air Force; Myanmar Police Force	Arakan Army

Casualties and losses
At least 21 killed, wounded, or captured.	unknown
- At least 60,000 civilians displaced; at least 15 killed or wounded.

On 20 February 2025, the Arakan Army started an offensive to capture Kyaukphyu District. Clashes first started near the Danyawaddy Naval base.

== Background ==
Kyaukphyu District in Rakhine State is home to the Kyaukphyu Special Economic Zone. A key asset of the SEZ is the Kyaukphyu Deep-Sea Port, which is part of China's Belt and Road Initiative.

After the 2024 Battle of Ann, the Myanmar junta only controlled Sittwe, Kyaukphyu, and the island of Cheduba in Rakhine State. AA intends to capture all of Rakhine to "restore the sovereignty of the Arakan people."

== Battle ==
On 20 February 2025, the Arakan Army and the Tatmadaw began clashes near Danyawaddy naval base. AA also attacked the No. 32 Police Battalion headquarters.

On 26 May 2025, Brigadier General Kyaw Myo Aung, a commander of the Tatmadaw's 11th Infantry Division, was killed by an AA sniper. Lieutenant Colonel Kyaw Lin Kyaing was also captured on 30 May 2025.

The Myanmar junta announced a ceasefire from 1 June to 30 June. Despite this, Tatmadaw forces reportedly bombed AA positions during the ceasefire period.

The junta claimed on 10 November 2025 that the village of Thaing Chaung and its dam were captured from AA.

On 14 November 2025, a group of Tatmadaw soldiers were killed by artillery from the Arakan Army shortly after a photo session at the briefly-occupied Kyaukphyu Meteorological Radar Station in Minpyin. Approximately 10 Tatmadaw soldiers were killed and more than 20 were injured, with Major Ko Ko Zaw being reportedly among the fatalities.

Around late March and early April 2026, the fighting intensified with AA killing about 10 junta soldiers and capturing several others between Tai Chaung and Pyay Chuen Creek villages.

The Taung Maw Oo naval base is located near the Maday Island with around guarded 500 junta troops. It is jointly held by Battalion 11 under the junta's forces and the Dhanawaddy Naval Command. During the first week of June, AA captured at least four-five military outposts out of six near the Taung Maw Oo naval base.

== Chinese interference allegations ==
On 18 February 2025, the SAC junta passed a law to allow foreign companies to station armed private security on company property in Myanmar. As China possesses significant investment of the Kyaukphyu SEZ, Chinese private security companies composed of former PLA soldiers and Burmese nationals were stationed near its properties. Since then, AA claimed that the Tatmadaw was being assisted by drone operators employed by Chinese security companies operating in Kyaukphyu.

== See also ==
- List of engagements during the Myanmar civil war (2021–present)
