= Maday Island =

Island in Myanmar

Native name: မဒေးကျွန်း
- Location within Myanmar

Geography
- Location: Indian Ocean
- Coordinates: 19.35898143524159°N 93.65520548017494°E
- Adjacent to: Bay of Bengal

Administration
- Myanmar
- State: Rakhine
- District: Kyaukpyu
- Township: Kyaukpyu

Demographics
- Population: (3,000)
- Languages: Rakhine; Burmese
- Ethnic groups: Rakhine

Additional information
- Time zone: MST (UTC+6.30)

Made Island (Burmese: မဒေးကျွန်း, also spelt Maday, Ma De, or Ma Day) is an island off Kyaukphyu, in Rakhine State, Myanmar. The island is the site of a deep-sea port being constructed as part of the Kyaukphyu Special Economic Zone. The island is home to four villages (including Ywama, Pyein, and Kyauktan), 700 homes, and 3,000 people. Most villagers engage in fishing, although recent development projects have forced fishermen to give up their fisheries, because the movement of tankers prevents fishing.

== Development projects ==
Construction of the China National Petroleum Corporation's pipeline through Myanmar began in 2012, and transmission of crude oil commenced on 2 May 2017. Fishermen demonstrated against the project due to its impact on their livelihoods. The pipeline project, whose entry point is on Made Island, was criticized for not economically benefiting locals. Only 47 locals were employed by PetroChina, with most workers imported from China.

Made Island, along with Ramree Island, will be one of two terminals of the Kyaukphyu deep seaport. The project, part of the Kyaukphyu Special Economic Zone, is being built at a cost of US$1.3 billion.

== See also ==
- Kyaukphyu
- Kyaukphyu Special Economic Zone
