= Kamein =

Southeast Asian ethnic group

Kaman
ကမန်
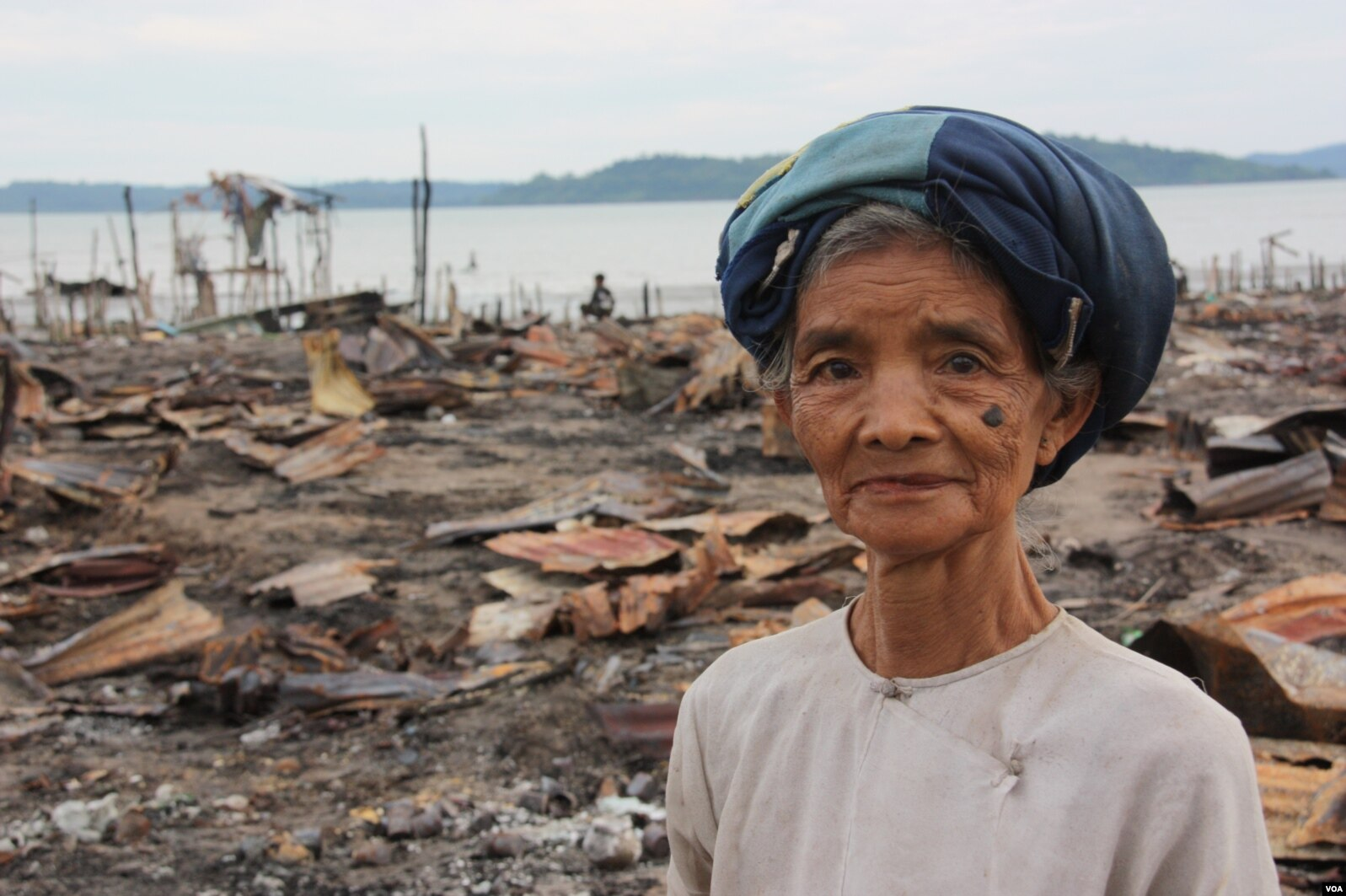
- A woman stands in front of a burnt Arakanese Muslim neighborhood in Kyauk Phyu, Myanmar.

Regions with significant populations
- Myanmar: 50,000

Languages
- Arakanese

Religion
- Islam

Related ethnic groups
- Persians; Rakhine

The Kamein (Burmese: ကမန်လူမျိုး), also known as the Kaman (ကမန်) or the Arakanese Muslims (ရခိုင်မွတ်စလင်များ), are a Southeast Asian, Indo-Aryan ethnic group indigenous to Rakhine State, Myanmar, where they primarily reside, and who predominantly follow Islam. The name Kaman comes from Persian, meaning "bow". The Kaman are formally recognized by the Burmese government and classified as one of the seven ethnic groups composing the Rakhine national race. The Kaman are considered indigenous and are widely acknowledged as Burmese citizens who hold national identity cards. The Kaman speak Rakhine, and their customs and dress resemble those of the Rakhine, unlike other Muslim groups in Rakhine and elsewhere in Myanmar.

== Geographic distribution ==
Approximately 28,000 of the 50,000 Kaman in Myanmar live in Rakhine State.

== History ==
=== Origins ===
Kaman is a term that has been used since the days of the Rakhine kings to refer to the archers of the Rakhine Royal Army. According to researchers and ethnographic studies, the word Kaman originated from the Persian word for "bow," meaning "skilled in bow and arrow" or "archer." In the Ministry of Education's distance education syllabus (Ma-412) for final-year compulsory Myanmar teaching of the "Rakhine Princess Lyric," the word Kaman is defined in line 33 as soldiers who were experts in archery and served in the Royal army of the Rakhine kingdom.

As the Kaman people were proficient in archery and demonstrated mental acuity and martial prowess, they held prestigious positions in the Rakhine Royal army. The archer division was named the Kaman Archers. Many historical documents about the Kaman state that only Rakhine indigenous people were allowed to serve in the Royal army, meaning that foreigners were not permitted to join. Given the above, it can be concluded that the present-day Kaman people are not outsiders but descendants of the Kaman archers of the ancient Rakhine Kingdom.

Historically, Kaman was not the name of a specific ethnic group, but rather the designation for the Rakhine Royal archer regiment. After the fall of the Rakhine Kingdom, the archers remained in groups, and their descendants are the present-day Kaman people of the Rakhine region. During the reign of King Ba Saw Pru, the royal court poet Adu Min Nyo referred to the Kaman in his verse of the "Rakhine Princess Lyric" (lines 33–34) as the brave archers of the Rakhine Kingdom.

The Kaman, one of the Rakhine ethnic groups, is also mentioned in the New Dannyawadi History by the venerable monk U Nyar Na. Furthermore, the traditions and cultural behaviors of the Kaman people are nearly identical to those of the Rakhine, as noted in the book Indigenous People of Rakhine State by journalist-turned-politician (ex-State Council member) U Hla Tun Pru.

For example, during Thingyan, the water festival, and Myanmar New Year's Eve, there was an old Kaman tradition of shampooing children, making charitable contributions by donating lakes for the convenience of water fetching, and building rest shelters for travelers. The Kaman also practiced monogamy, and prior to marriage, they would consult astrology to check the fate of the bride and groom and select an auspicious wedding date, a custom also practiced by the Rakhine people. Even today, the Kaman speak the Rakhine language, wear Rakhine-style clothing, and live peacefully alongside the majority Rakhine population.

It is not accurate to state that the term Kaman was introduced after the arrival of the Indian royal prince Shah Shuja and his entourage to the Rakhine Kingdom in AD 1234. The Kaman had already settled in Rakhine before AD 1234. Kaman archers served in the Rakhine Royal army during the reigns of kings such as Nga Hnalone Min (1234–1247), Alawma Pyu Min (1250), Narameik Hla (alias) Min Saw Mon (1404–1434), Ba Saw Pru (1459–1482), Min Ba Gyi (alias) Min Bin Gyi (1531–1553), Thadoe Thudama Raza (alias) Min Raza Gyi (1593–1612), Thiri Thudama Raza (alias) Min Khari (1622–1638), Sandha Thudama Raza (1652–1684), Sandha Wizaya Raza (1710–1731), and many others who reigned before AD 1234.

=== Rakhine kingdoms ===
==== Nga Hnalone Min (1234-1237 AD) ====
King Nga Hnalone was the last king of the 22nd dynasty of the Datha Raza family, whose ancestor King Kawlia built the city of Parein. King Nga Hnalone was wise and skilled in administration. When there was a unified Bengal and Chakma Kalar and Thet rebellion, he sent his trusted Pyisogyi Dhamazeya with an army of 50,000 troops.

The army of King Nga Hnalone confronted the Bengal-Chakma troops in Chittagong, but the rebels could not resist and retreated to Decca, where they barricaded themselves. During the battle, the Bengal prince was defeated by the Rakhine commander-in-chief Dhama Zeya, who was riding an elephant. The Bengal army was subsequently forced to evacuate. Likewise, the Rakhine army defeated the Delhi troops and brought Bengal prisoners of war to Rakhine. Of the 42,700 prisoners brought from Bengal, 1,000 were assigned to duties under the Kaman Archers, as described in the New Rakhine History (First Edition, Chapter 4) by Taung Kyaung Sayadaw of Ramree. This supports the claim that Kaman archers had been serving in the Rakhine Royal army well before the reign of King Nga Hnalone Min (1234-1237 AD).

==== Narameik Hla (alias) Min Saw Mon (1404-1434 AD) ====
British historian G.E. Harvey wrote in his prestigious Outline of Burmese History that the word Kaman was Persian for "bow and arrow."

According to the British Burma Gazette published in 1897, Persian and Arab traders reached the port cities of Southeast Asia, including Burma. Therefore, it is undoubted that trade with foreign countries led to the introduction of foreign influences in language, culture, and other sectors. As a result, the word Kaman, derived from the Persian language, was adopted into the Rakhine court's vocabulary.

Moreover, from the early fifteenth and sixteenth centuries, some Rakhine kings adopted Islamic Persian titles despite their Buddhist beliefs.

=== Modern era ===
The Kaman have faced significant discrimination by the Rakhine due to their religious affiliation. They are frequently conflated with the Rohingya people even though the Kaman have been recognized as an official ethnic group since the Ne Win era. They have been caught in tensions between the Buddhist majority and Muslim minorities, particularly in Rakhine State.

Violence during the 2012 communal unrest in Rakhine State severely damaged relations between Kaman and Rakhine Buddhists, leading to broken trust. Many Kaman, such as Daw Nwe Nwe Win, have expressed a desire to return to Rakhine State if law and order are restored. Kaman leaders continue to call for equal treatment and respect for their constitutional rights.

In 2018, the Myanmar government proposed resettling 157 Kaman families from IDP camps in Ramree Township to Yangon, but the proposal sparked political debate. Some lawmakers opposed the resettlement, fearing it would spread ethnic conflict. Despite this, the resettlement was approved, as the Kaman are entitled to freedom of movement under Myanmar's constitution. However, Kaman families in Yangon have faced hardships, including inadequate state support and poor living conditions.

In the aftermath of the 2021 Myanmar coup d'état, the situation has worsened. On 18 February 2024, Tatmadaw officials threatened to revoke the citizenship of Kaman IDPs in Kyaukphyu if men between the ages of 18 and 55 did not form pro-junta militias. On 28 February 2024, 125 Kaman were forcibly pressed into military service by the Tatmadaw. According to the Burma Human Rights Network, many Kaman also fear oppression by the Arakan Army.

== See also ==
- Islam in Myanmar
