= CMEC =

CMEC may refer to the following:

- China-Myanmar Economic Corridor "CMEC"
- Child Maintenance and Enforcement Commission
- Conservative Middle East Council
- Carnegie Middle East Center
- China Machinery Engineering Corporation
- Christian Methodist Episcopal Church
- Council of Ministers of Education, Canada

== See also ==
- China National Machinery Import and Export Corporation (referred as CMC)
