= Kyaukphyu Deep-Sea Port =

Port in Myanmar

The Kyaukphyu Deep-Sea Port (Burmese: ကျောက်ဖြူ ရေနက်ဆိပ်ကမ်း) is an infrastructure project under development in Kyaukphyu, Rakhine State, Myanmar. It forms a component of the Kyaukphyu Special Economic Zone (SEZ) and is part of China's Belt and Road Initiative (BRI), specifically for the China-Myanmar Economic Corridor (CMEC). The port is intended to provide China with direct access to the Indian Ocean, bypassing the Strait of Malacca. The project is led by a joint venture between the Chinese state-owned CITIC Group and the Myanmar government.

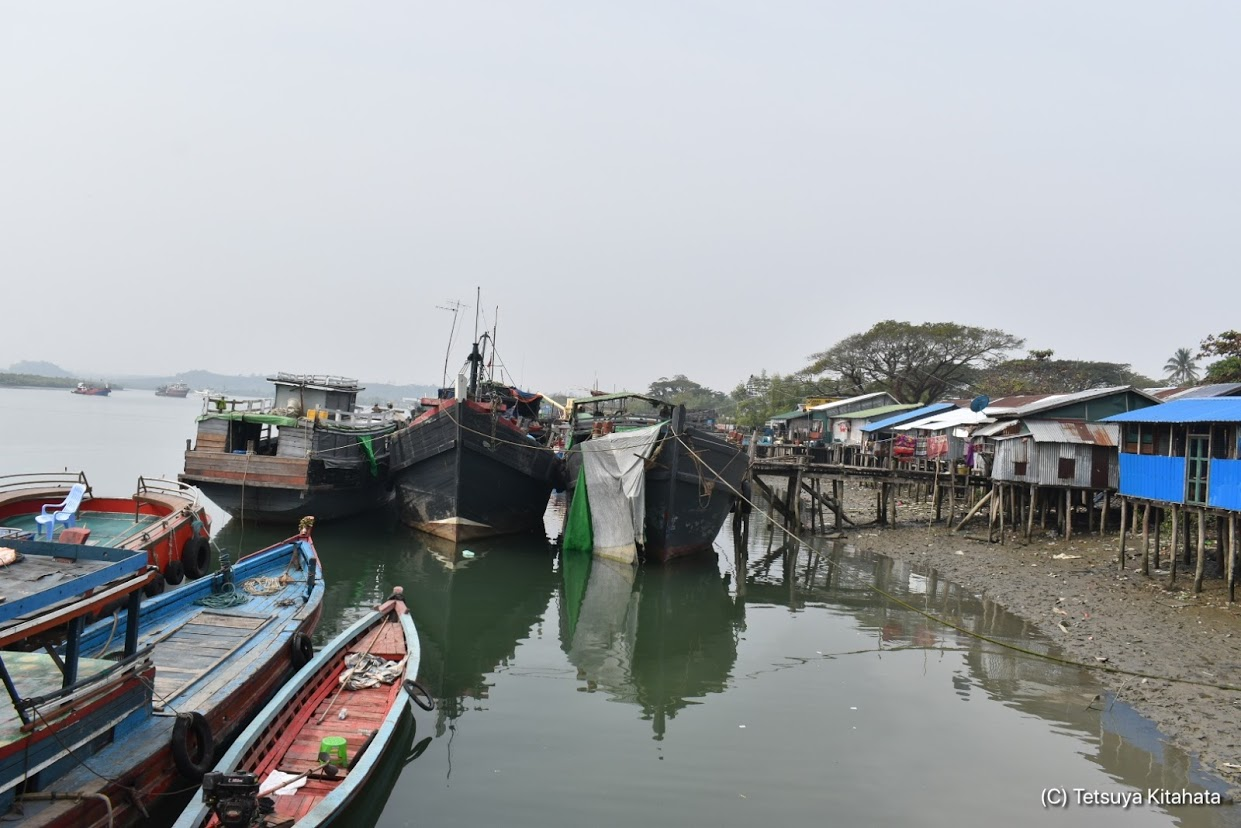
Kyaukpyu Port during construction in 2018

== Background ==
Kyaukphyu is a coastal town in Rakhine State. The port is designed to handle large cargo vessels, addressing the limitations of Myanmar's existing river ports, such as Yangon Port, which can only accommodate vessels up to 15,000 DWT with a 9-meter draft.

The port can connect Kunming in China's Yunnan Province to Myanmar's economic centers, including Muse, Mandalay, Yangon, and Kyaukphyu. The port provides China with a shorter trade route to the Indian Ocean which reduces reliance on the Strait of Malacca.

The port project was formalized following the establishment of the Kyaukphyu Special Economic Zone Management Committee on 13 January 2014. The project gained momentum after the CITIC Consortium was selected as the developer through an international open tender process on 30 December 2015. The port is part of a broader SEZ that includes an industrial zone and a high-end housing project, covering approximately 4,300 acres (1,740 hectares).

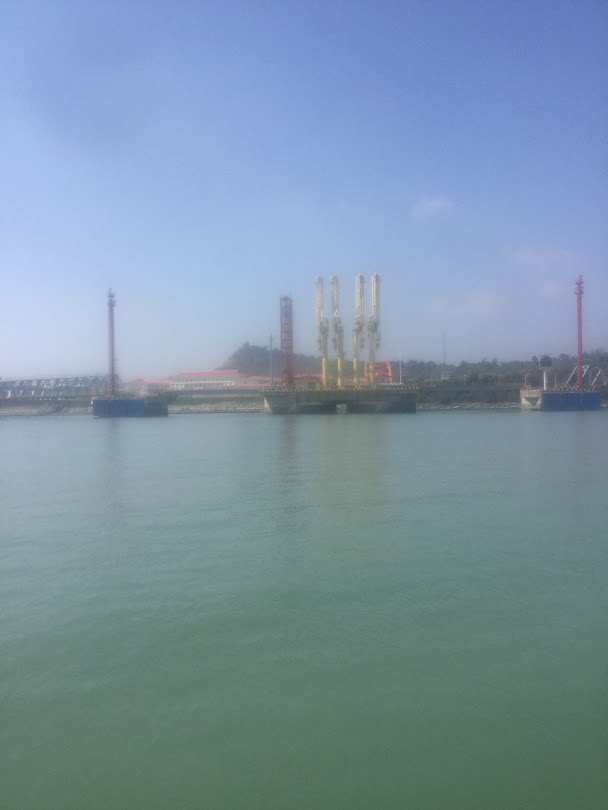
Myanmar China Petro Transportation

== Project ==
The Deep-Sea Port project is estimated to cost US$7.3 billion and will be implemented in three phases. The first phase, estimated to cost US$1.3 billion, is focused on constructing a deep-sea port on Maday Island, covering 370 acres. The second phase includes a port on Ramree Island (237 acres), and the third phase will expand the port's capacity.

The project encompasses several major components designed for regional infrastructure and industrial development. The port infrastructure includes construction of two deep-sea ports featuring a total of 10 wharfs. The wharfs are capable of accommodating large container ships, positioning the area as a strategic maritime hub.

To support connectivity, the project includes the construction of a bridge connecting Maday Island and Ramree Island, as well as a 15-kilometer road linking the port facilities to the Special Economic Zone industrial park. In addition, there are plans for expanded rail and road links between Kyaukphyu and Mandalay so that it can be aimed at strengthening inland transportation and trade routes.

To meet the energy demands of the SEZ and surrounding infrastructure, the project also features the installation of gas-fired power plants with a combined generation capacity of approximately 300 megawatts.

== Timeline ==
On 13 January 2014, the Myanmar government established the Kyaukphyu Special Economic Zone Management Committee to oversee the development of the deep-sea port project.

On 30 December 2015, Myanmar awarded the Kyaukphyu Deep-Sea Port project to a consortium led by China's state-owned CITIC Group. This partnership was formalized under a 50-year lease agreement.

On 8 November 2018, the Management Committee and China's CITIC Group signed a framework agreement to develop the Kyaukphyu Deep-Sea Port. This led to the growth in component of China's Belt and Road Initiative.

In January 2020, during Chinese President Xi Jinping's visit to Myanmar both countries signed agreements to finalize the Deep-Sea Port joint venture. The project's first phase was scaled down from $7.2 billion to $1.3 billion under Myanmar's NLD government due to concerns over debt dependence on China.

On 26 December 2023, Myanmar's junta and China's CITIC signed a supplementary agreement to speed up the Kyaukphyu port project. This mainly included enhanced security measures to protect Chinese workers and infrastructure due to growing threats from the Arakan Army in Rakhine State.

On 28 April 2024, approximately 300 Chinese workers arrived at Maday Island to advance preparatory work for the Deep-Sea Port despite ongoing conflict between the Myanmar military and the Arakan Army. The workers were granted permission by the junta to proceed with the project.

In March 2025, CITIC and Myanmar junta officials met to update the Kyaukphyu port due to concerns following the Arakan Army's capture of nearby Ramree. The junta then later extended the project's completion deadline to 26 June 2025.

As of mid-2025, heavy clashes have been reported around the port area between the Arakan Army and Myanmar military forces. The military has been making efforts to secure the area of Chinese investments.

== Funding and ownership ==
The project is developed by the Kyaukphyu Special Economic Zone Deep Seaport Co. Ltd., a joint venture between CITIC Myanmar Port Investment Limited (70% stake) and the Myanmar government-backed Kyaukphyu SEZ Management Committee (30% stake). The CITIC-led consortium includes China Harbour Engineering Company Ltd., China Merchants Holdings, TEDA Investment Holding, Yunnan Construction Engineering Group and Thailand's Charoen Pokphand Group.

Myanmar's 30% stake represents over 4% of its 2023 GDP. To address concerns about a potential debt trap, the project's scale was reduced from an initial US$7.2 billion to US$1.3 billion for the first phase under the National League for Democracy government in 2020.

== Criticism ==
The port is projected to displace up to 20,000 people, primarily fishermen and farmers across 20 villages. Fishing restrictions have already limited access to traditional fishing grounds which threatens livelihoods for approximately 70% of Maday Island's 3,000 residents who rely on fishing. Farmers are expected to lose over 2,000 acres of ancestral land.

Residents have expressed concerns about the loss of livelihoods, environmental degradation and the lack of accountability in previous Chinese projects. The Kyaukphyu Rural Association reported in 2017 that local communities fear repeating the land confiscation during the construction of the Sino-Myanmar pipelines. Some locals view CITIC's community engagement like as Chinese language courses with suspicion and speculating they may be a pretext for project advancement.

== See also ==
- Kaladan Multi-Modal Transit Transport Project
- Xiamen Special Economic Zone
  - Xiamen Port
- Yangshan Deepwater Port
