= Private Security Services Law =

Private Security Services Law ပုဂ္ဂလိကလုံခြုံရေးဝန်ဆောင်မှုဆိုင်ရာဥပဒေ

State Administration Council
- Long title: Private Security Services Law No. 4/2025
- Territorial extent: Myanmar
- Enacted by: State Administration Council
- Enacted: 18 February 2025

Related legislation
- Myanmar Companies Law

Summary
- Establishes a comprehensive regulatory framework for private security services within Myanmar
- Status: In force

The Private Security Services Law (Burmese: ပုဂ္ဂလိကလုံခြုံရေးဝန်ဆောင်မှုဆိုင်ရာဥပဒေ) in Myanmar is a significant piece of legislation enacted by the State Administration Council (SAC), the ruling military junta, on 18 February 2025. This law establishes a comprehensive regulatory framework for private security services within Myanmar, aiming to bring both domestic and foreign private security companies under stricter government oversight and to ensure their cooperation with state security apparatus. Notably, the law was designed to accommodate China's interests in the country, particularly regarding its extensive investments and projects, including those related to the Belt and Road Initiative.

== Key provisions ==
The law provides for a dedicated and comprehensive legal framework for private security services, with existing regulations being fragmented and often outdated. The new law regulates a growing private security sector, and protects foreign investments, particularly Chinese interests. The law is seen by many analysts as specifically designed to accommodate China's desire to safeguard its extensive investments and projects in Myanmar, including those related to the Belt and Road Initiative, especially in areas where the junta has lost control to anti-junta forces. This law enables foreign private security companies, potentially staffed by former military personnel from China, to operate with arms. The law also explicitly mandates cooperation between private security firms and state security organizations, effectively extending the military regime's surveillance and enforcement capabilities. In Myanmar's context, this could lead to private security forces assisting the regime in suppressing dissent and potentially being complicit in human rights abuses, given the junta's broad definition of "crime."

Under the law, private security service companies must obtain licenses from the Supervisory Central Committee for Private Security Services, chaired by the Minister of Home Affairs. The law also defines qualifications, operational requirements and obligations for security personnel. Licensed private security firms can apply for permits to carry firearms and ammunition, with approval from the National Defense and Security Council.

== See also ==
- China–Myanmar relations
- Sino-Myanmar pipelines
