= Mong La District =

Mong La Township Mong La District ၸႄႈဝဵင်းမိူင်းလႃး ၸႄႈတွၼ်ႈမိူင်းလႃး
- Township and District
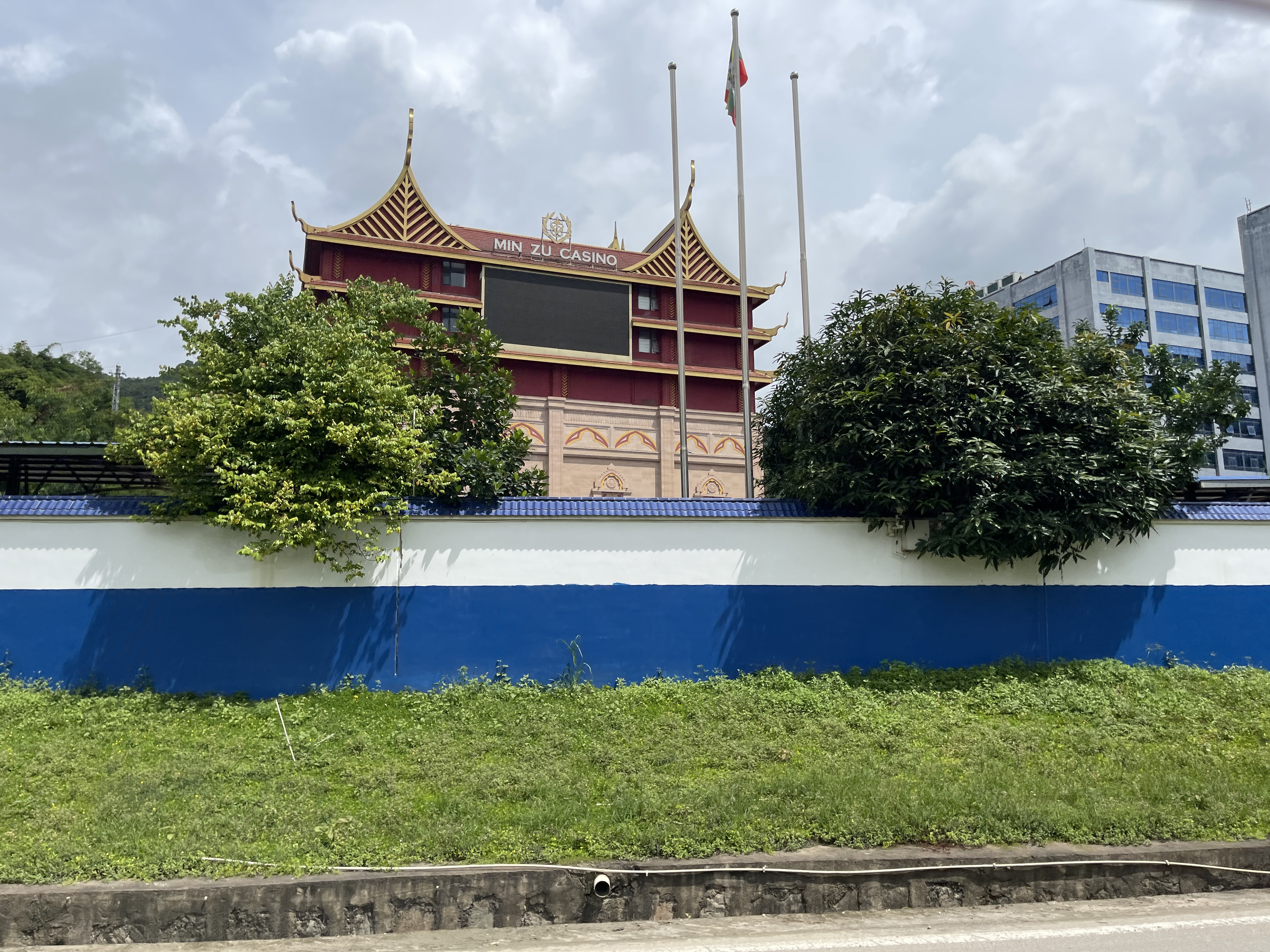
- Minzu Casino in Wanyo village in western Mongla Township

- Location in Shan State
- Coordinates: 21°40′0″N 100°0′0″E
- Country: Myanmar
- State: Shan State
- Capital: Mong La
- Elevation: 645 m (2,116 ft)
- Time zone: UTC+6:30 (MST)

Mong La Township (Shan: ၸႄႈဝဵင်းမိူင်းလႃး, Burmese: မိုင်းလားမြို့နယ်) is the only township of Mong La District (Shan: ၸႄႈတွၼ်ႈမိူင်းလႃး, Burmese: မိုင်းလားခရိုင်) in far eastern Shan State, Myanmar. The district borders China and Laos. The principal town is Mong La.

Sharing a border with China, the Mong La area is a center for the production and traffic of narcotics and illegal wildlife trade. It offers gambling and prostitution to Chinese tourists in an unregulated environment outside Myanmar government control.

== History ==
The Mong La region was Special Region Number 4 of Shan before the new constitution (2008). It hosts the National Democratic Alliance Army (NDAA) and its leader Lin Mingxian aka Sai Leun. It was the #815 War Zone of the former Communist Party of Burma (CPB). In 2008 the United Wa State Army (UWSA) strongly opposed the move to give away the adjacent area of Mong Pawk from its control because it serves as a link with its ally, the NDAA in Mong La.

In 2022, Mong La Township was promoted to its own district, splitting off from former Kengtung District.
