= Dawei Port Project =

Planned deep sea port in Myanmar

Coordinates: 14°15′33″N 98°02′32″E

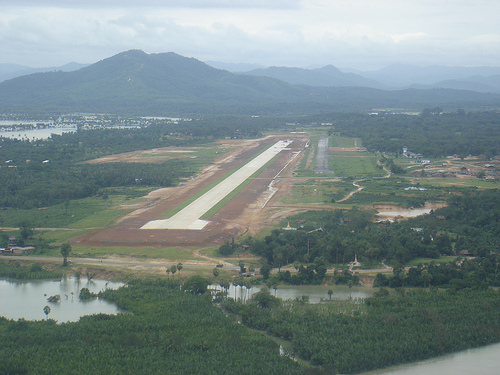
The Dawei Airport

The Dawei deep-sea port and special economic zone (Dawei SAR) is an infrastructure project in Myanmar. Construction started but was suspended in 2013. Plans to resume construction were announced in August 2015. It is in Dawei, the capital of the Tanintharyi Region. It aims to transform Dawei into Myanmar's and Southeast Asia's largest industrial and trade zone. It aims to develop local businesses, provide local employment opportunities, and stimulate the construction of infrastructure. It is notable for its tumultuous history, as many financial and human rights violations have arisen during the project's history. If completed, it will be the largest industrial zone in Southeast Asia.

== Dawei Special Economic Zone law ==
The Dawei Special Economic Zone Law, officially known as The State Peace and Development Council Law No. 17, was passed on 27 January 2011. The law has a number of notable tax breaks for investors and developers, in order to spur investment in the region. The law stipulates that two zones, the promotion zone and the exempted zone, are to exist within the special economic zone itself. The two zones differ in their tax breaks.

Tanintharyi Region in Myanmar

=== Income tax breaks ===
Investors in the project are exempt from income taxes on their businesses for their first seven years of operation in the exempted zone, and for their first five years of operation in the promotion zone. In both zones, investors receive 50% relief in their second five years of operation, and 50% relief on all profits in their third year of operation. Developers have all of the same stipulations, except they are exempted from income tax in their first eight years of operation.

=== Customs duties ===
Developers are exempted from customs duties for construction materials, machinery, equipment, heavy machinery, and vehicles. Investors have the same exemption in the exempted zone, but in the promotion zone pay 50% of normal duties for the first five years of transport into Dawei.

=== Business and investors' rights ===
Businesses in the Dawei port project have been granted a number of rights by the law which are not common elsewhere in Myanmar. They are given the right to open foreign bank accounts, and have relaxed currency exchange restrictions. Additionally, foreign companies and investors are allowed to invest in the project, and the government does not regulate product pricing. The law also stipulates that the government will not seize, or nationalize businesses in the zone.

=== Proposed zones ===
The project, as stipulated by The Dawei Special Economic Zone Law, aims to construct many differentiated zones. High-tech industrial zones, information technology zones, export processing zones, port area zones, transportation zones, technological research & development zones, service business zones, sub-trading zones, and governmental zones are all part of the construction project. In the construction of these zones, law also stipulates that investors and developers must employ local workers. Businesses are supposed to find these workers via labor recruitment agents. Twenty-five percent of their non-specialist workforce is required to be employed by Myanmar citizens during their first five years, 50% during their second five years, and 75% during their third five years. Businesses are also required to supply adequate training for all of their employees. The project is also set to include a 160 kilometer-long two lane super highway that connects the zone to the Thai-Myanmar border. A large amount of infrastructure is required to be built as well, so a high-speed railway, an electric grid, a dockyard, a deep sea port, and oil and gas pipelines are slated for construction. The entirety of the special economic zone is slated to be 196 square kilometers, and will be ten times larger than Thailand's largest industrial zone.

== Construction timeline ==
=== Initial plan and project suspension ===
Myanmar and Thailand signed a memorandum of understanding (MOU) to develop the Dawei Special Economic Zone (ထားဝယ်အထူးစီးပွားရေးဇုန်) in 2008. Another MOU was signed in July 2012. The Myanmar and Thai governments then agreed to complete the project by 2015 at an ASEAN summit in November 2012. The estimated total costs of the project were US$8.6 billion, but those estimates have since risen to US$10.7 billion.

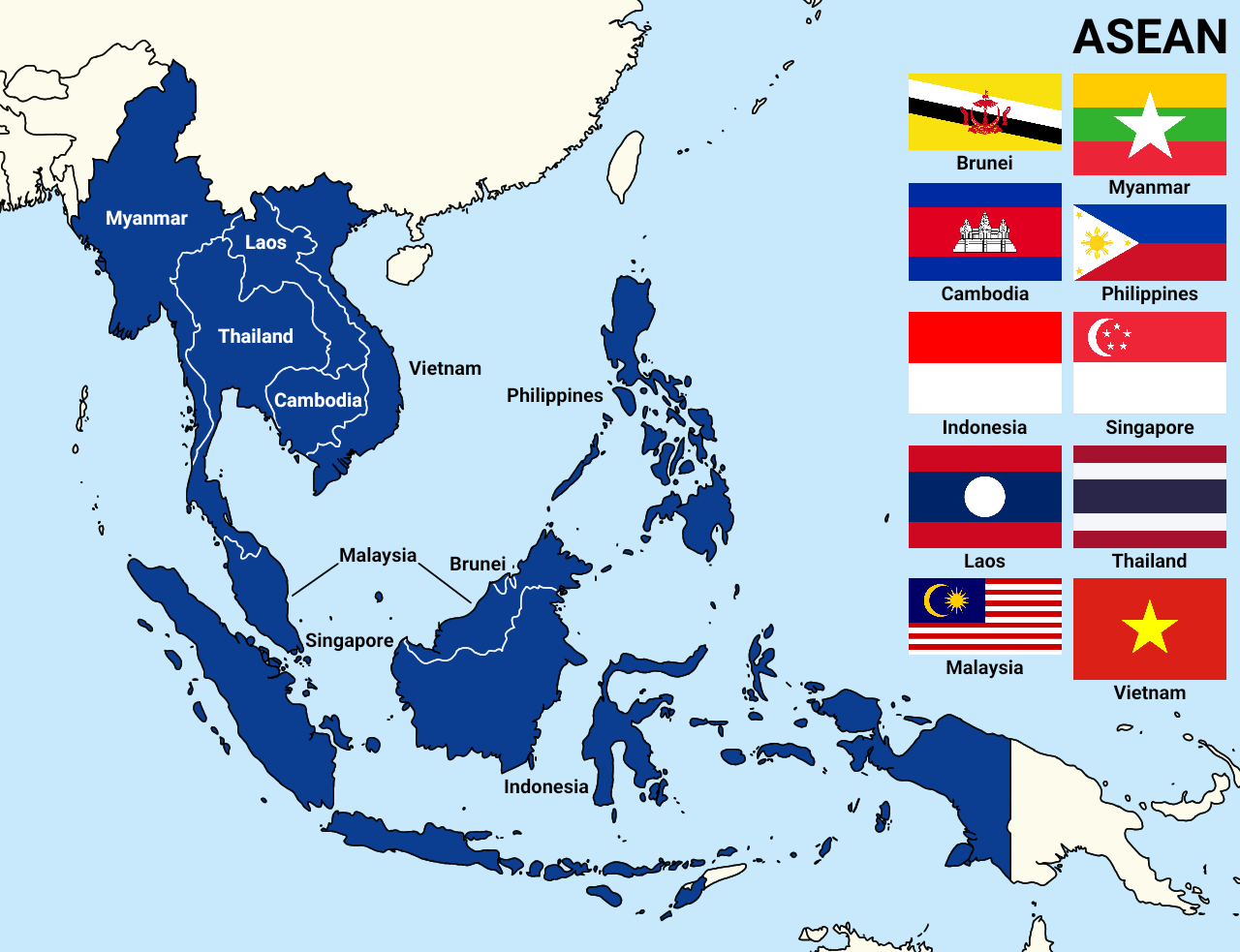
Member Countries of ASEAN

Myanmar initially granted Italian-Thai Development PCL (ITD) a 75-year concession in 2008 to construct the project, and attract investment, as a part of the first memorandum of understanding. The investment required to develop the zone at the time was estimated to total US$8.6 billion, and require 1,000 laborers. Progress slowed due to a lack of funds, but the Myanmar and Thai government opted to continue construction despite this. In 2012, Max Burma Conglomerate confirmed that it would pull out, giving up its 25% stake in the project. In 2013, after failing to attract enough investment, and failing to commit to a power source, ITD was stripped of its position as the sole leader of development in the zone. The Myanmar and Thai governments temporarily seized responsibility from ITD, in an attempt to rescue the floundering project. Han Sein, the Chairman of the Dawei Special Economic Zone Management Committee told reporters, "In this economic zone, there needs to be a lot of investors." The ITD was then required to halt activities so that the three international auditing companies Ernst & Young, PricewaterhouseCoopers, and Deloitte could check to see if the project was being built to international standards. Up until the suspension of construction in 2013, the ITD had spent US$189 million on the project.

Following this suspension and Max Burma Conglomerate's pullout, the Myanmar and Thai governments both took 50% stakes in the project, and looked to attract international investors. Myanmar and Thailand proposed involving Japan as a third-party investor, but the Japanese government declined to invest in the project. Despite consistent pressure from the Thai government, significant funding from Japanese investors did not occur. In 2013, Thailand's Office of Transport and Traffic Policy and Planning conducted a new feasibility study of the zone's infrastructure, as Japan had disagreed with the plan made by Italy-Thai group. Thai banks committed US$4 billion following these issues, in an attempt to keep the project moving.

=== Resumption ===
The initial resumption of construction was set for 15 May 2014, but was delayed as both governments looked for investors. Additionally, they created a new plan, which involved two phases of construction, the initial phase, and the full-fledged phase. The new plan also stipulated that the zone would cover 196 square kilometers, instead of 204.5 square kilometers. Many experts thought that the Dawei Special Economic Zone was doomed to failure. The Economic Affairs Officer at The United Nations Economic and Social Commission for Asia and the Pacific said that Kalargote Island looked like a more promising, and more feasible opportunity, noting that a logistically-sound deep sea port should be the singular focus of Myanmar's next step forward in their industrialization. In 2014, the Myanmar and Thai governments officially announced that they planned to revive the project, which had been dormant for the past two years. They plan to utilize ITD once again, while bringing in the help of Rojana Industrial Park PLC.

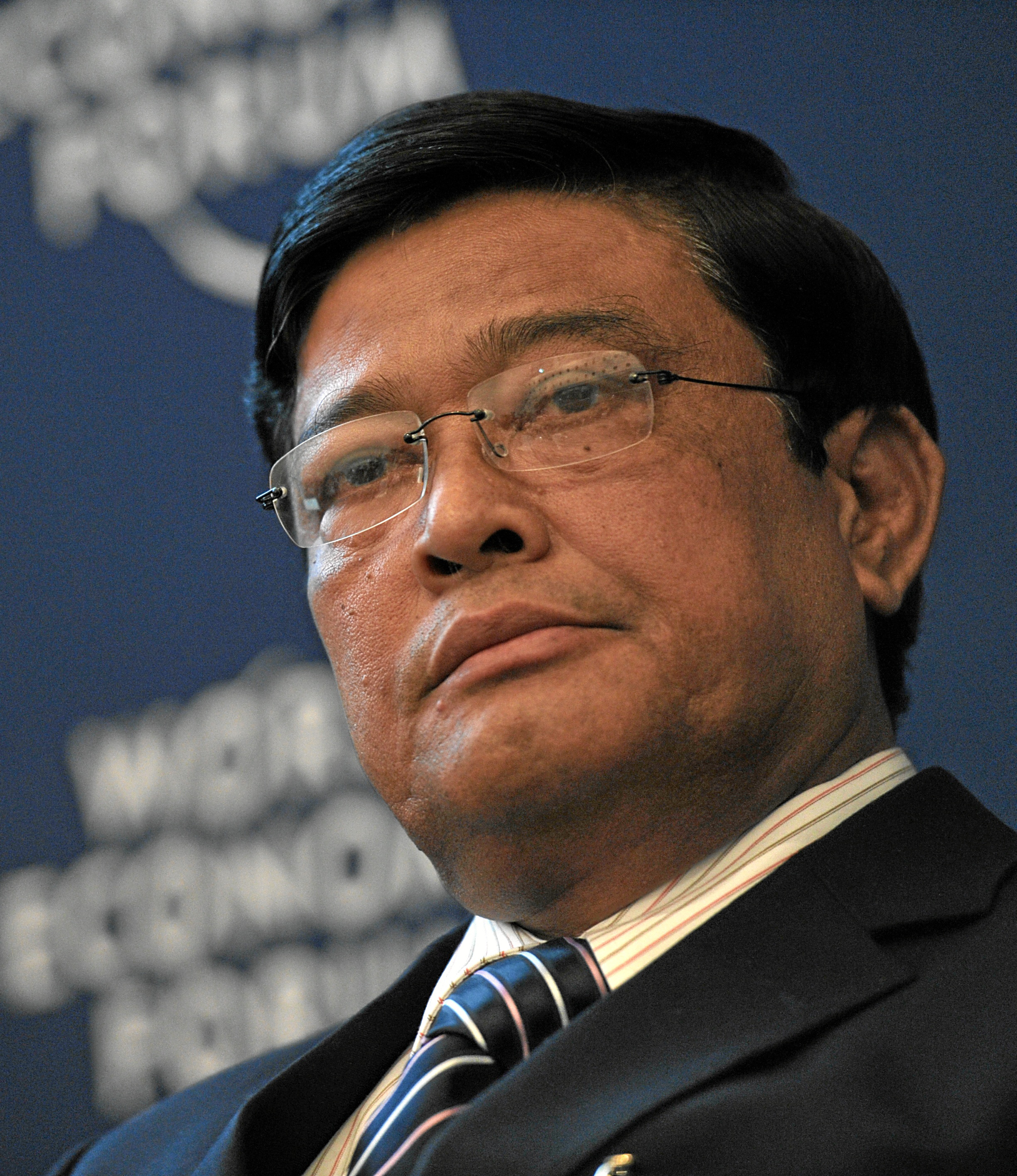
Myanmar Vice President Nyan Tun at the World Economic Forum in 2013

On 30 January 2015, Japan agreed to participate in the project. It was revealed that they will hold equal partnership to Myanmar and Thailand in the Dawei Special Economic Zone Development Co, and intend to provide technical and financial support for the project. On the same day, Rojana and ITD announced that they will sign an agreement in March 2015 to develop the initial phase of the project, which is estimated to cost US$1.7 billion. The new plan states that the 160 kilometer road to the Myanmar-Thai border will be built first, with a budget of US$119 million. The Thai government will provide Myanmar with soft loans to help provide the necessary capital. Thai Deputy Prime Minister Pridiyathorn Devakula said that during this first phase of construction, they aim to complete a small port, a reservoir, a telecoms network, and other basic infrastructure projects in the next five years. This initial phase is set to cover 27 square kilometers of the planned 196 square kilometer industrial complex. Myanmar's Vice President Nyan Tun said that with the help of Japan, this project will now be able to move along quickly.

Moving away from the stipulations made in the Dawei Special Economic Zone Law of 2011, it was also announced that the Neighboring Countries Economic Development Cooperation Agency are being hired to redevelop a master plan for the zone.

On August 2026, the military-backed Union Government of Myanmar discussed collaboration on the Dawei SAZ with Russia. Coinciding with these talks are reports of a military offensive to retake Tanintharyi Region from rebel forces during the Myanmar Civil War.

== Controversy and human rights issues ==
=== Dawei Development Association ===
This special economic zone project has been criticized extensively for its human rights abuses of local villagers. There is significant opposition from local populations, due to alleged land seizures, forced evictions, insufficient compensation for confiscated farmland, and denial of their right to sufficient food, and adequate housing. Additionally, there is a significant fear of health problems, as the massive industrial complex will be a significant polluter. The Dawei Development Association, a coalition of civil society groups, was set up by residents of Dawei to look into the project, and raise awareness.

U Tin Maung Swe, chairman of the Support Group for the Deep Sea Port and Special Economic Zone, responded to concerns by telling the media, "People have criticized this project because of the chemical industries and their fears of the effect on the environment and the social structure. We won't accept any investment that could have a negative impact. We want labor-intensive industries that can produce value-added local products. We're always thinking about the public interest." According to U Phone Shwe, Deputy Minister for Social Welfare, Relief, and Resettlement, residents, who have in total lost over 6,000 acres of land to the project thus far, have received US$33 million in compensation. The project expects to owe villagers about US$307 million more moving forward.

According to the villages of the area and the Dawei Development Association (DDA), villagers were either underpaid by the project, or not paid at all. When villagers were paid, they weren't given enough money to buy new farmland, which lowered their standards of living. They estimate that 20 to 36 villages housing 22,000 to 43,000 people will be affected by the project. The DDA called for a freeze on the special economic zone in 2014, in hopes to prevent it from resuming at a large scale without human rights abuses being attended to. The DDA also called for The National Human Rights Commissions of Thailand and Burma to conduct a full investigation on human rights abuses in the mega-project, as a part of a report that they released, titled Voices From the Ground: Concerns Over the Dawei Special Economic Zone and Related Projects, which evaluated the abuses.

The DDA received an audience with The National Human Rights Commission of Thailand in October 2014 after releasing their report, to submit findings on human rights abuses in the project. According to the report, two-thirds of households didn't receive information from the ITD or the government about the project. Only 15% of households received any form of compensation for lost land, and many families were coerced or tricked into relocation. Additionally, only 27% of surveyed residents ever received consultation meetings, and said meetings were oftentimes one-way and non-negotiable. Despite the stalling of operations in 2013, much of the land for the project has been seized and cleared, and 71% of households in the area are expected to lose their land to the project. Upon receiving the report, Thai officials deflected the blame onto the Burmese government, whose own National Human Rights Commission has not offered the DDA an audience.

=== Tavoyan Women's Union ===
The Tavoyan Women's Union, a local rights NGO in Dawei, released a 2014 report titled Our Lives Not for Sale, that claimed the project was destroying local economy. The report describes how the Dawei Special Economic Zone project has undermined local agricultural and fishing livelihoods, through the confiscation of land, restriction of coastal access, and destruction of farmland. The report also found that villagers in Dawei were now facing food insecurity, and three-quarters of people surveyed reported that they had to take their children out of school for financial reasons. In another report, they found that people near the proposed site had a loss in income, which forced many of them to send family members to Thailand to work. Five weeks after Our Lives are Not for Sale was published, U Phone Swe, a Deputy Minister in the Tanintharyi Regional Government, organized a public demonstration in support of the special economic zone. The 300 demonstrators shouted that the TWU, and everyone else who didn't support the project was their enemy. The TWU also reported that government officials went to teachers in the region, and told them not to teach about the negative impacts of coal. They allegedly warned the teachers not to oppose the coal project, as they were "teaching politics".

== See also ==
General

- Economy of Myanmar
- Special Economic Zone
  - Gelephu Special Administrative Region, in Bhutan on border with India
  - Kyaukphyu SAR, in coastal Myanmar
  - Thilawa Special Economic Zone, in coastal Myanmar
  - Mong La SAR, in eastcentral Myanmar on border with China
  - Shwe Kokko SAR, in southern Myanmar on border with China

Exclusive economic zones

- Exclusive economic zone of India
- Exclusive economic zone of Indonesia
- Exclusive economic zone of Malaysia
- Exclusive economic zone of Thailand

Major regional port projects

- Sabang strategic port development, India-Indonesia project
- Sittwe Port, India-Myanmar project
- India's Look-East Connectivity projects
