= Thilawa Special Economic Zone =

Industrial area in Myanmar

Coordinates: 16°40′41″N 96°16′21″E

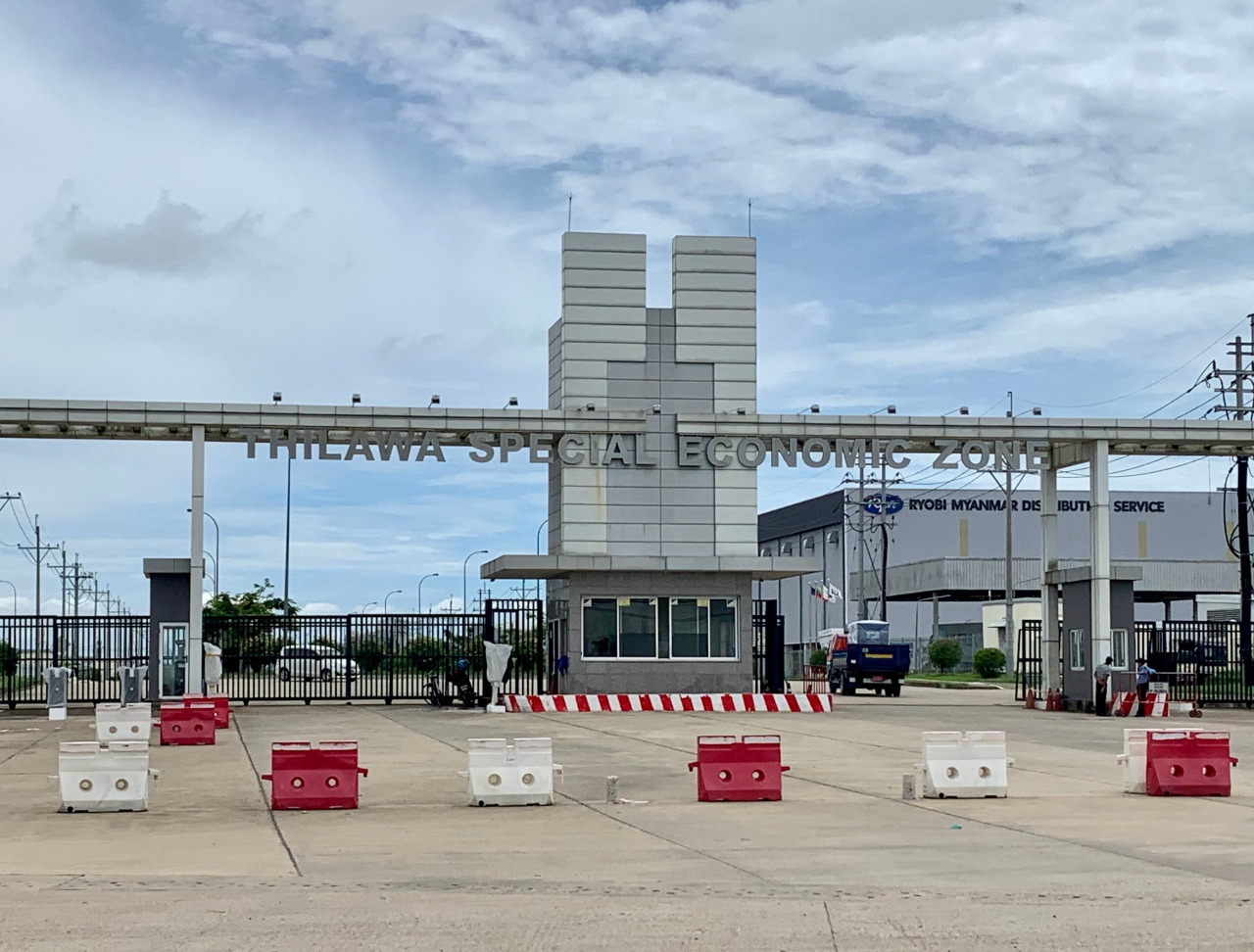

Thilawa Special Economic Zone (Burmese: သီလဝါအထူးစီးပွားရေးဇုန်; abbreviated Thilawa SEZ) is a 2,500-hectare (6,200-acre) special economic zone being developed in Kyauktan and Thanlyin Townships, 25 kilometres (16 mi) south of Yangon city. The first phase of the SEZ became operational at the end of September 2015.

== History ==
The project was announced in January 2011. Thilawa SEZ is being developed by a joint venture, initially between the Japan External Trade Organization and the Union of Myanmar Federation of Chambers of Commerce and Industry. The Burmese and Japanese governments established a consortium including Japan Thilawa SEZ Company (backed by Mitsubishi, Marubeni and Sumitomo corporations), Myanmar Thilawa SEZ Holdings, Thilawa SEZ management committee and the Japan International Cooperation Agency (JICA) on 29 October 2013 to proceed with development. Construction on the $3.28 billion project began in May 2014.

The first phase of the SEZ was slated to complete in 2016, but became operational at the end of September 2015.

== Management ==
The current Chairman of Thilawa Special Economic Zone's Management Committee is Winston Set Aung.

== See also ==
- Special economic zone
  - Gelephu Special Administrative Region, in Bhutan on border with India
  - Dawei SAR, in coastal Myanmar
  - Kyaukphyu SAR, in coastal Myanmar
  - Mong La SAR, in eastcentral Myanmar on border with China
  - Shwe Kokko SAR, in southern Myanmar on border with China
- Economy of Burma
