= Ramree Township =

Coordinates: 19.0833°N 93.8667°E

Ramree Township ရမ်းဗြဲမြို့နယ်
- Township
- Location in Kyaukphyu district
- Country: Myanmar
- State: Rakhine State
- District: Kyaukphyu District

Population (2014)
  - Total: 97,891
- Time zone: UTC+6:30 (MMT)

Ramree Township (Burmese: ရမ်းဗြဲမြို့နယ်) is a township of Kyaukpyu District in the Rakhine State of Myanmar. The principal town is Ramree, situated on Ramree Island. The Burmese pronunciation of Ramree is Yangbye Myo. The island has over 300 villages and the principal town is Yanbye (Ramree). The island's streams empty into the Bay of Bengal.

The township consists of six urban wards, fifty-one village tracts and 217 villages. According to 2018-2019 population statistics, there is about 98,370 residents. The town contains various businesses, schools and healthcare facilities. Agriculture is the main economic activity, alongside fish and shrimp farming.

== History ==
The place has been labeled campaign of the Second World War during the Japanese occupation of Burma in the 1940s.

On 11 March 2024, Ramree Township was captured by the Arakan Army.

On 8 January 2025, the Tatmadaw carried out air strikes in the Kyauk Ni Maw village of Ramree Township, killing at least 40 people and destroying around 500 homes.
