= Sino-Myanmar pipelines =

International infrastructure projects

Sino-Myanmar Crude Oil and Gas pipelines
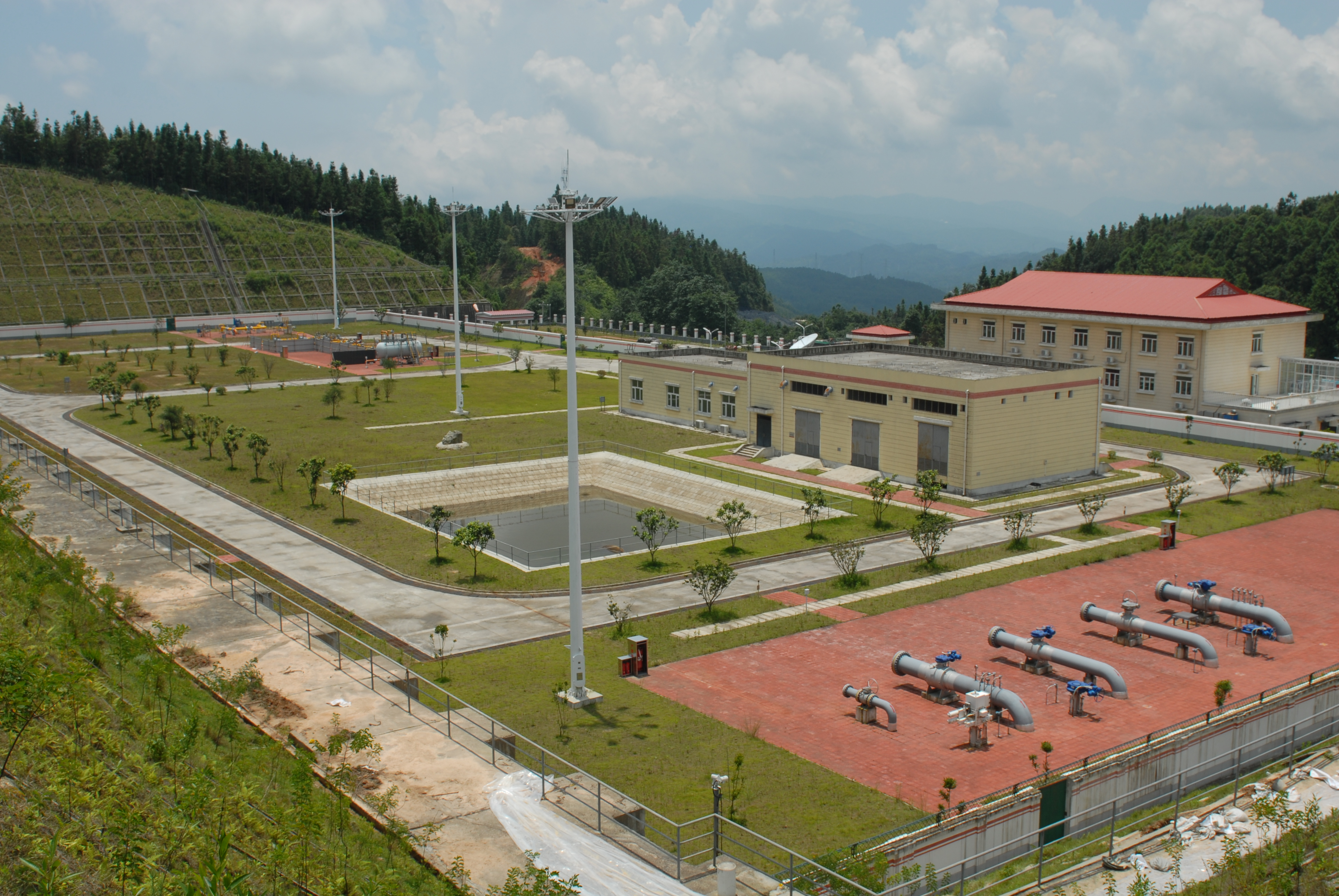
- An offtake station of Sino-Myanmar pipelines in Longling County, Yunnan Province

Location
- Country: Myanmar, China
- Coordinates: 19°21′52″N 93°41′04″E
- Direction: south–north
- Start: Kyaukphyu
- Passes through: Mandalay, Lashio, Namkham, Ruili
- To: Kunming
- Runs alongside: Sino–Myanmar natural gas pipeline

General information
- Type: Separate oil and Gas
- Partners: China National Petroleum Corporation; Myanma Oil and Gas Enterprise

Technical information
- Length: 771 km (479 mi)
- Maximum discharge: 240 thousand barrels per day (38×10^{3} m^{3}/d)

Sino-Myanmar Crude oil and Natural Gas pipelines
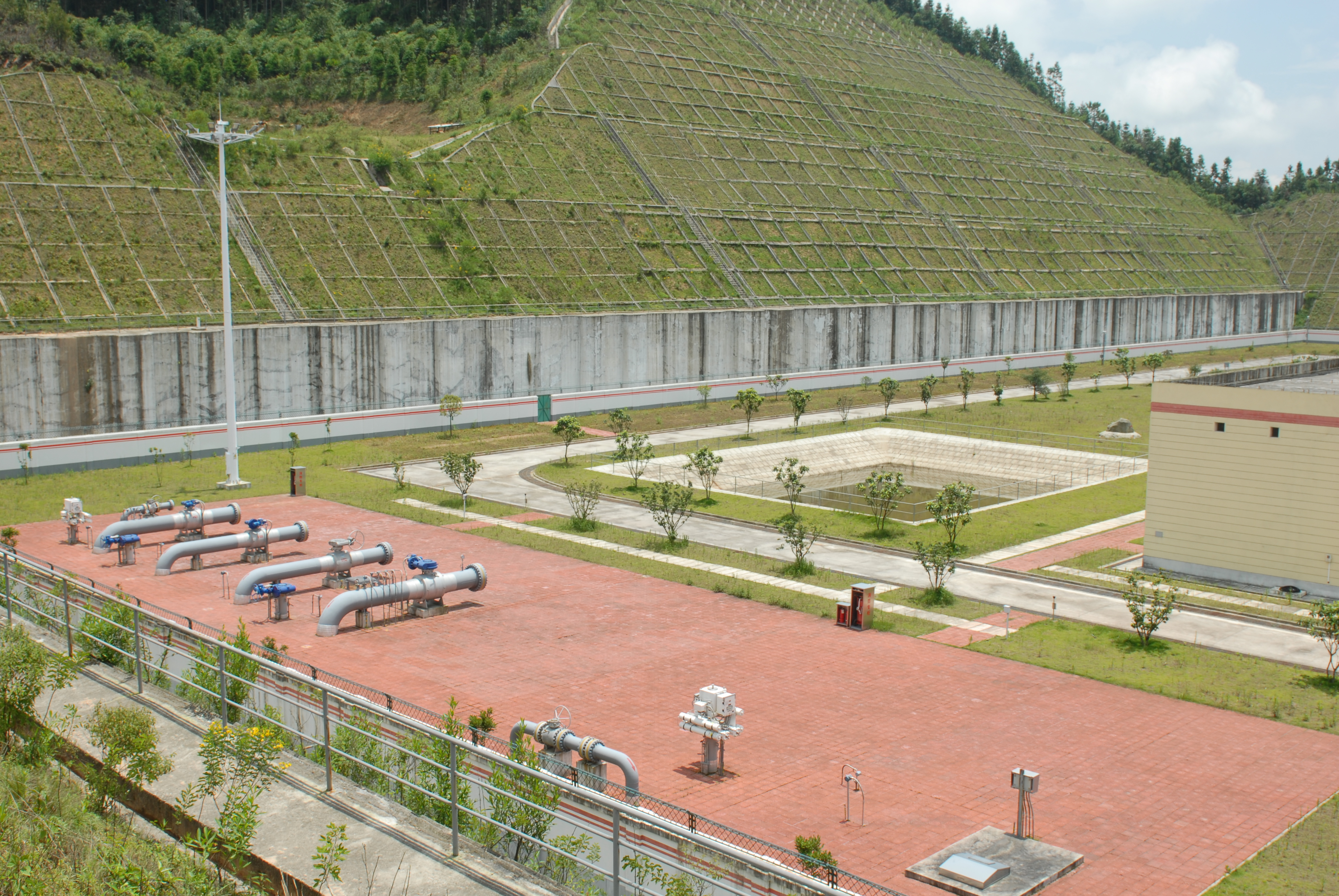
- An offtake station of Sino-Myanmar pipelines in Longling County, Yunnan Province

Location
- Country: Myanmar, China
- Direction: south–north
- Start: Kyaukphyu
- Passes through: Mandalay, Lashio, Namkham, Ruili, Kunming
- To: Guizhou and Guangxi
- Runs alongside: Sino–Myanmar crude oil pipeline

General information
- Type: Crude Oil and Natural Gas
- Partners: China National Petroleum Corporation; Myanma Oil and Gas Enterprise

Technical information
- Length: 2,806 km (1,744 mi)
- Maximum discharge: 12 billion cubic meters per year

Sino-Myanmar pipelines refers to the oil and natural gas pipelines linking Myanmar's deep-water port of Kyaukphyu in the Bay of Bengal with Kunming in Yunnan province of China.

== History ==
Talks between China and Myanmar on the feasibility of the project began in 2004. In December 2005, PetroChina signed a deal with Myanmar's Government to purchase natural gas over a 30-year period. Based on this agreement, the parent company of PetroChina, China National Petroleum Corporation (CNPC), signed on 25 December 2008 a contract with the Daewoo International-led consortium to purchase natural gas from the Shwe gas field in A-1 offshore block. The pipeline is viewed as a strategic measure to reduce China's dependence on maritime routes through the Strait of Malacca, a vulnerability known as the "Malacca dilemma," by providing a direct overland route for energy imports from the Indian Ocean. The plan to build the oil and gas pipelines was approved by China's National Development and Reform Commission in April 2007. In November 2008, China and Myanmar agreed to build a US$1.5 billion oil pipeline and US$1.04 billion natural gas pipeline. In March 2009, China and Myanmar signed an agreement to build a natural gas pipeline, and in June 2009 an agreement to build a crude oil pipeline. The inauguration ceremony marking the start of construction was held on 31 October 2009 on Maday Island.

The Myanmar section of the gas pipeline was completed on 12 June 2013 and gas started to flow to China on 21 October 2013. The oil pipeline was completed in August 2014.

In 2021, the Myanmar military seized the oil and gas sector during the 2021 Myanmar coup d'état In the ensuing civil war, the Sino-Myanmar pipelines became a point of focus for both sides to gain support from or leverage against Chinese interests, being increasingly caught between combatants.

== Route ==
The oil and natural gas pipelines run in parallel and start near Kyaukphyu on Maday island port on the Bay of Bengal in Myanmar (19°21'52.39"N, 93°41'3.91"E), run under the sea for 5.3 kilometres (3.3 mi) to mainland (19°21'26.09"N, 93°44'3.41"E) and then run through Mandalay, Pyin Oo Lwin, and Namkham in Myanmar before entering China at the border city of Ruili in Yunnan province. The oil pipeline, which eventually terminates in Kunming, capital of Yunnan province, is 771 kilometres (479 mi) long. The natural gas pipeline will extend further from Kunming to Guizhou and Guangxi in China, running a total of 2,806 kilometres (1,700 mi). The China-Myanmar crude oil pipeline project operation corresponds with China's "Belt and Road" Initiative, which will provide more direct way for China's imports of crude oil to bypass the crowded Malacca Strait. China plans to construct additional pipelines in coming years.

== Description ==
The oil pipeline will have a capacity of 12 million tonnes of crude oil per year. It would diversify China's crude oil imports routes from the Middle East and Africa, and avoid traffic through the Strait of Malacca. Oil storage tanks will be built on an island near the port of Kyaukphyu. For oil processing China will build refineries in Chongqing, Sichuan, and in Yunnan.

The gas pipeline will allow delivery of natural gas from Burma's offshore fields to China with an expected annual capacity of up to 12 bcm of natural gas. The pipeline will be supplied from the A-1 and A-3 Shwe oil field. China would start receiving natural gas from Burma's Shwe project through the pipeline in April 2013. The Shwe, Shwe-Phyu, and Mya areas in the A-1 and A-3 blocks, estimated to hold 127–218 bcm of natural gas in total, are operated by a group led by Daewoo International Corp. The operators group also includes Myanma Oil and Gas Enterprise, GAIL, and Korea Gas Corporation.

The total project of pipelines is expected to cost US$2.5 billion.

In July 2014 CNPC celebrated the first anniversary of the launch of the Myanmar-China natural gas pipeline by announcing that nearly two billion cubic metres of gas has been piped from Indian Ocean plays onto the Asian continent.

A railway that will connect Muse and Lashio is part of the project. The railway will be 80 miles long and will include 41 bridges, 36 tunnels and 7 stations.

== Controversy ==
A number of protests in Burma and abroad took place against the construction of the pipeline. The pipelines have sparked protests over environmental and safety concerns, and inadequate compensation arrangements for local residents. Critics have also said the contract, which was signed under the military regime, should be revisited and that Burma should not be exporting gas when three-quarters of the population lack electricity.

== Operating company ==
The project will be implemented jointly by China National Petroleum Corporation (CNPC) and Myanma Oil and Gas Enterprise (MOGE). CNPC will hold a 50.9% stake and manage the project, and MOGE will own the rest.
