= Kyaukphyu =

Kyaukphyu ကျောက်ဖြူမြို့
- Town
- Location in Myanmar
- Coordinates: 19.4250°N 93.5315°E
- Country: Myanmar
- State: Rakhine State
- District: Kyaukpyu
- Township: Kyaukpyu Township
- Established: 1838

Population (2014)
  - Total: 180,000
  - Ethnicities: Arakanese; Chin; Kamein
  - Religions: Buddhism; Christianity; Islam
- Time zone: UTC+6.30 (MMT)
- Area code: +95-43-46-xxx

Kyaukphyu (Burmese: ကျောက်ဖြူမြို့ [tɕaʊʔpʰjù mjo̰]; also spelt Kyaukpyu) is a major town in Rakhine State, in western Myanmar and it is informally addressed to be the second capital of Rakhine State. It is located on the northwestern corner of Yanbye Island on Combermere Bay, and is 250 miles or 400 kilometres north-west of Yangon. It is the principal town of Kyaukphyu Township and Kyaukphyu District. The town is situated on a superb natural harbor which connects the rice trade between Kolkata and Yangon.

The town is home to several deep-water port projects, as well as the western end of the Sino-Myanmar pipelines the Kunming–Kyaukphyu Railway and natural gas pipelines.

As of 2026, Kyaukphyu and Sittwe are the only major cities in Rakhine State still under the control of the Myanmar government; most of the rest of the State is controlled by the Arakan Army.

== Etymology ==
The name Kyaukphyu (lit. 'white rock') is the Burmese pronunciation. In Rangbre and Arakanese, the town's name is pronounced "Kyaukphru." The old Kyaukphyu is situated 7 miles (11 km) from the present town where two colossal white rocks exist.

== History ==
Earliest traces of history in the town date back to the 8th century, during the reign of Sula Taing Chandra who founded the settlement.

Before the colonial era, Kyaukphyu was a small fishing village of limited importance. Following the First Anglo-Burmese War, British forces stationed troops there, and in 1838, the district headquarters was transferred from Ann to Kyaukphyu because of its coastal access which is a strategic location. Ramree and Ann districts were later merged into Kyaukphyu District.

Kyaukphyu gradually expanded as an administrative and port town. The British established Kyaukphyu in 1838 on the spot of the fishing village. In 1852, Kyaukphyu became a district city.

On October 22, 2010, Cyclone Giri made landfall on the west coast of Myanmar just north of the town at category five strength.

== Climate ==
Kyaukphyu has a tropical monsoon climate (Köppen climate classification Am). Temperatures are very warm throughout the year, although the winter months (December–February) are somewhat milder. There is a winter dry season (December–April) and a summer wet season (May–November). Torrential rain falls from June to August, with over 1,200 millimetres (47 in) falling in July alone.

Climate data for Kyaukpyu (1991–2020)
Month	Jan	Feb	Mar	Apr	May	Jun	Jul	Aug	Sep	Oct	Nov	Dec	Year
Mean daily maximum °C (°F)	27.0 (80.6)	28.5 (83.3)	30.8 (87.4)	33.0 (91.4)	32.9 (91.2)	30.3 (86.5)	29.5 (85.1)	29.6 (85.3)	30.8 (87.4)	31.6 (88.9)	30.4 (86.7)	28.2 (82.8)	30.2 (86.4)
Daily mean °C (°F)	22.1 (71.8)	23.3 (73.9)	26.2 (79.2)	28.9 (84.0)	29.3 (84.7)	27.6 (81.7)	27.1 (80.8)	27.1 (80.8)	27.9 (82.2)	28.3 (82.9)	26.7 (80.1)	23.8 (74.8)	26.5 (79.7)
Mean daily minimum °C (°F)	17.2 (63.0)	18.2 (64.8)	21.5 (70.7)	24.8 (76.6)	25.8 (78.4)	25.0 (77.0)	24.7 (76.5)	24.6 (76.3)	24.9 (76.8)	24.9 (76.8)	23.1 (73.6)	19.3 (66.7)	22.8 (73.0)
Average precipitation mm (inches)	17.5 (0.69)	3.3 (0.13)	4.9 (0.19)	23.2 (0.91)	382.1 (15.04)	1,184.9 (46.65)	1,293.4 (50.92)	1,152.8 (45.39)	599.9 (23.62)	305.9 (12.04)	67.1 (2.64)	17.3 (0.68)	5,052.4 (198.91)
Average precipitation days (≥ 1.0 mm)	0.7	0.4	0.5	1.9	13.4	25.4	28.7	28.3	22.1	13.3	3.3	0.9	138.7
Source: World Meteorological Organization

== Demographics ==
The town is populated with Arakanese Buddhists, and small groups of Indians, Kameins and Chins.

The estimated population in 1983 was 19,456. The population of Kyaukphyu's urban area is 20,866 as of 2014, while Kyaukphyu Township's population is 165,352.

== Attractions ==
- Kyaukphyu Viewpoint, or more popularly known as Point is perhaps the best-known attraction in Kyaukphyu. It is at the end of the Strand Road and overlooks the Bay of Bengal and the mouth of the Thanzit (Kyaukphyu) River.
- Gant-gaw-taw, is one of the most sacred Buddhist shrines, believed to have built in the Vesali period.
- Kyauk-ta-lone phaya, built by King Min-ba in the Mrauk U period, is the focal point of Kyaukphyu's Buddhist environment, beside Gant-gaw-taw shrine.
- The Japan-Myanmar Relationship Pagoda, in the outskirts of the city, is popular among the city's small Japanese population.

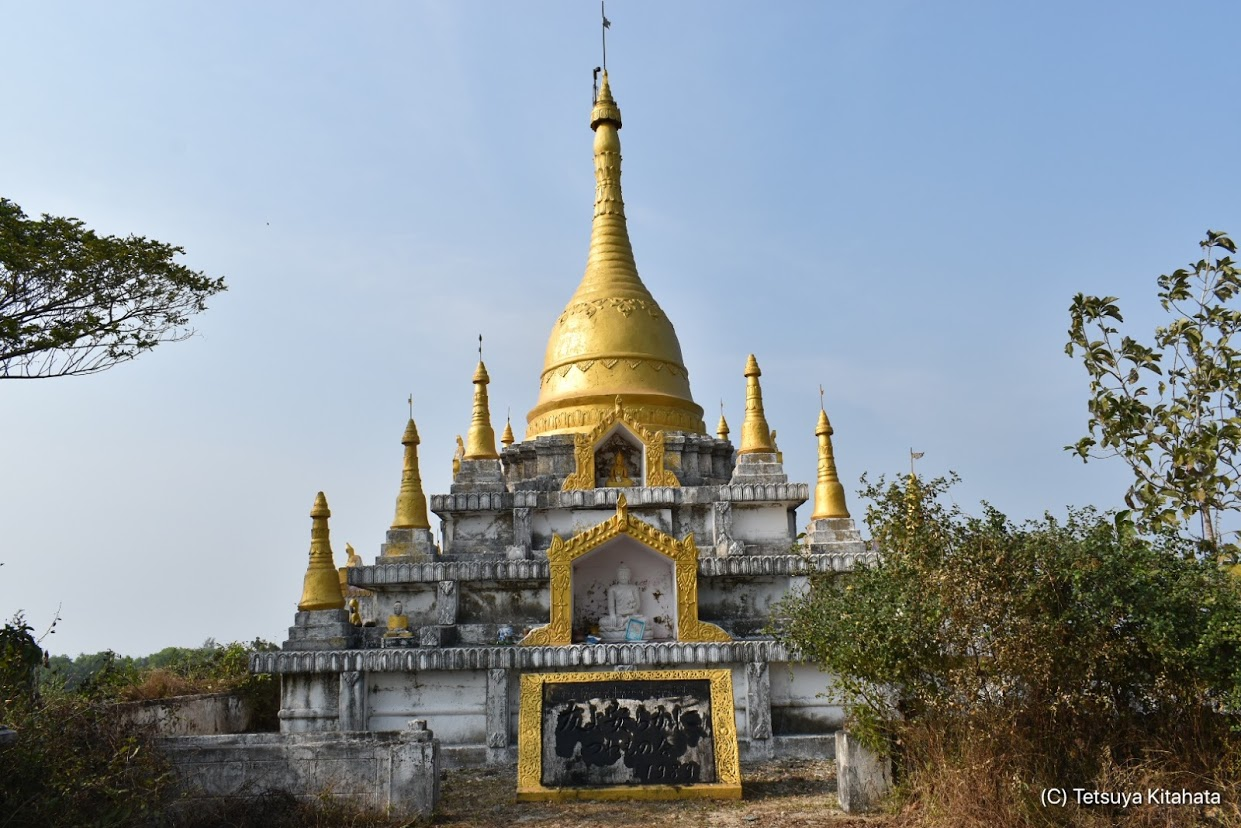
Japan-Myanmar Relationship Pagoda in Kyaukpyu

== Economy ==
=== Oil pipeline ===
In December 2008, China and Burma signed a deal to construct an oil pipeline at Kyaukphyu. On 30 November 2010, the China Development Bank and Myanmar Foreign Investment Bank signed a $2.4 billion loan deal to construct the 660 miles (1,060 km) pipeline from Kyaukphyu to Kunming in Yunnan province, China. The pipeline is expected to be completed in 2015 and capable of transporting 400,000 barrels of oil per day. These construction projects will allow China to directly obtain oil and gas from the Middle East (via the port terminal at Kyaukphyu), thereby avoiding shipping through the Malacca Straits. The oil pipeline was completed in August 2014.

=== Natural gas pipeline and terminal ===
Separately, as reported by the Financial Times in February 2013, nearly 2,000 workers are finalising close to Kyaukphyu, a major natural gas projects, the Shwe gas pipeline and onshore terminal. This terminal and pipeline are being built by South Korea's Daewoo International in a consortium with state-owned Myanmar Oil and Gas Enterprise (MOGE) and others. From May 2013, this pipeline is planned to pump about 12,000,000,000 cubic metres (4.23776×10^{11} cu ft) of natural gas annually, most of which will also go to China via nearby Maday island.

These oil and gas Sino-Burma pipelines projects are supervised by a Myanmar "Kyaukphyu Special Economic Zone" agency and are estimated to use about U$3bn of investments and to have the potential of creating over 200,000 jobs, while additional capital will be required to develop a port for dry containerized and bulk cargoes, as well as a railway which will link Kyaukphyu to Kunming, in Yunnan.

The Myanmar section of the gas pipeline was completed on 12 June 2013 and gas started to flow to China on 21 October 2013.

=== Special Economic Zone and its impact ===
Myanmar government officials have stated that these massive projects will be conducted with enhanced consultation with the local population. In this respect, there has already been protests by some locals against the consequences of some of these projects, such as potential impact on fishing or land confiscations which may be conducted by authorities for these terminals and pipelines. A December 2012 report by the "Arakan Oil Watch" organization about plans to build a special economic zone near Kyaukphyu on Ramree Island in Arakan State, claimed it would "endanger the health of thousands of people and destroy Myanmar's second largest mangrove forest". The report, titled "Danger Zone," states that around 40 villages would be adversely affected by the project, which would use 120 km^{2} of pristine coastline.

At the end of December 2015, the Myanmar government announced that it had chosen a consortium of mostly Chinese companies to develop a special economic zone and a deep-water port, as a result of a tender initiated in 2014 for an industrial park and a deep-water port to be built and operated as public–private partnerships.

The selected Chinese-led consortium won over a dozen other bidders to win the development rights late last year. The six companies in the consortium include China state-owned groups Citic (finance), China Harbour Engineering, China Merchants Holdings (International), TEDA Investment Holding, Yunnan Construction Engineering Group (YNJG), and the Charoen Pokphand Group, a Thai conglomerate. CITIC and the six other investing firms will hold an 85 percent stake, with the Burmese government taking the rest.

While China Harbour Engineering is an engineering firm for designing and building deep sea ports, the China Merchants Group, through some of its affiliates (China Merchants Holdings (International), China Merchants Group, both listed on the Hong Kong stock exchange, and China Merchants Energy Shipping) is a global operator of ports as well as of oil tanker and dry bulk ships which has been approved to absorb in 2016 another Chinese state-controlled tanker and bulk ships operator, Sinotrans Shipping.

By 2025, the consortium plans to build a roughly 1,000-hectare industrial park and Myanmar's highest-capacity port, with facilities able to handle 7 million 20-foot-equivalent-units (TEU) of containerized cargo per year. Total project costs are estimated to be in the range of several billion dollars. The projects are said to lead to the creation of some 100,000 jobs.

Some analysts claim that the Kyaukphyu deep-water port has a strategic dimension as part of China's Belt and Road Initiative and String of Pearls strategy.

The Kyaukphyu port and Special Economic Zone (SEZ) is one of three major port and coastal development projects in Myanmar, together with the Thilawa zone near Yangon, the country's most populous and economically developed city, and the Dawei zone in the south-east, near the Thai border, all of which have attracted major financial and industrial interests.

== Transport ==
Water ways is the main mode of transportation and traveling. There were boat accidents because of poor maintenance and lack of enforcement on regulation. Over 100 were assumed to be dead in Aung Takon 3 ferry accident of March 2015.

=== Port ===
In June 2007, Asia World announced that it would be building a deep sea port on Maday Island in Kyaukphyu. The port will be a transit point for goods destined for Yangon, Kolkata, and Chittagong. The port is part of the 21st Century Maritime Silk Road that runs from the Chinese coast to the south via Singapore towards the southern tip of India, then through the Red Sea via the Suez Canal to the Mediterranean, there via Haifa, Istanbul and Athens to the Upper Adriatic region to the northern Italian hub of Trieste with its rail connections to Central Europe and the North Sea.

The port is viewed as a gateway to the Bangladesh-China-India-Myanmar (BCIM) Economic Corridor.

=== Kunming–Kyaukphyu Railway ===
The railway project would be 1,215 kilometres or 755 miles long, and its design and construction are subject to a preliminary agreement between Myanmar's and China's government.

In 2009, a railway link through to Jiegao in China was proposed. In 2011 the proposal was expanded to a link between Kunming and Kyaukphyu. President Thein Sein's signed a memorandum of understanding during his May 2011 visit to Beijing between Myanmar's rail transport ministry and China's state-owned Railway Engineering Corporation to build the railway. It will also connect to Kaladan Multi-Modal Transit Transport Project via 311 km link to be completed by 2021–22, from Kyaukhtu in north to Ann in south and then south-east to Minbu.

A feasibility study for a standard gauge line from Kunming, China to Kyaukphyu port started in 2021.

== Education ==
A teacher training college (TTC) was opened in Kyaukphyu in 1953. Now, this college is known as "Kyaukphyu Education College" and was upgraded to "Kyaukphyu Education Degree College" in which academic subjects are taught. In 1954, Kyaukphyu Intermediate College for Arakan, the embryo of Sittwe University was opened in Kyaukpyu. Kyaukphyu GTI was opened in 2014 and upgraded to a Government Technological College in 2022, and from the 2022–2023 academic year, it started teaching courses that will provide the Bachelor of Engineering Technology (B.Tech). In 2023, it became Technological University, Kyaukpyu.

== See also ==
- Point, Kyaukphyu
- Kyaukphyu Airport
- Shwe gas field
- Sino-Burma pipelines
