= Mong La =

Mong La မိုင်းလား / 勐拉
- Town
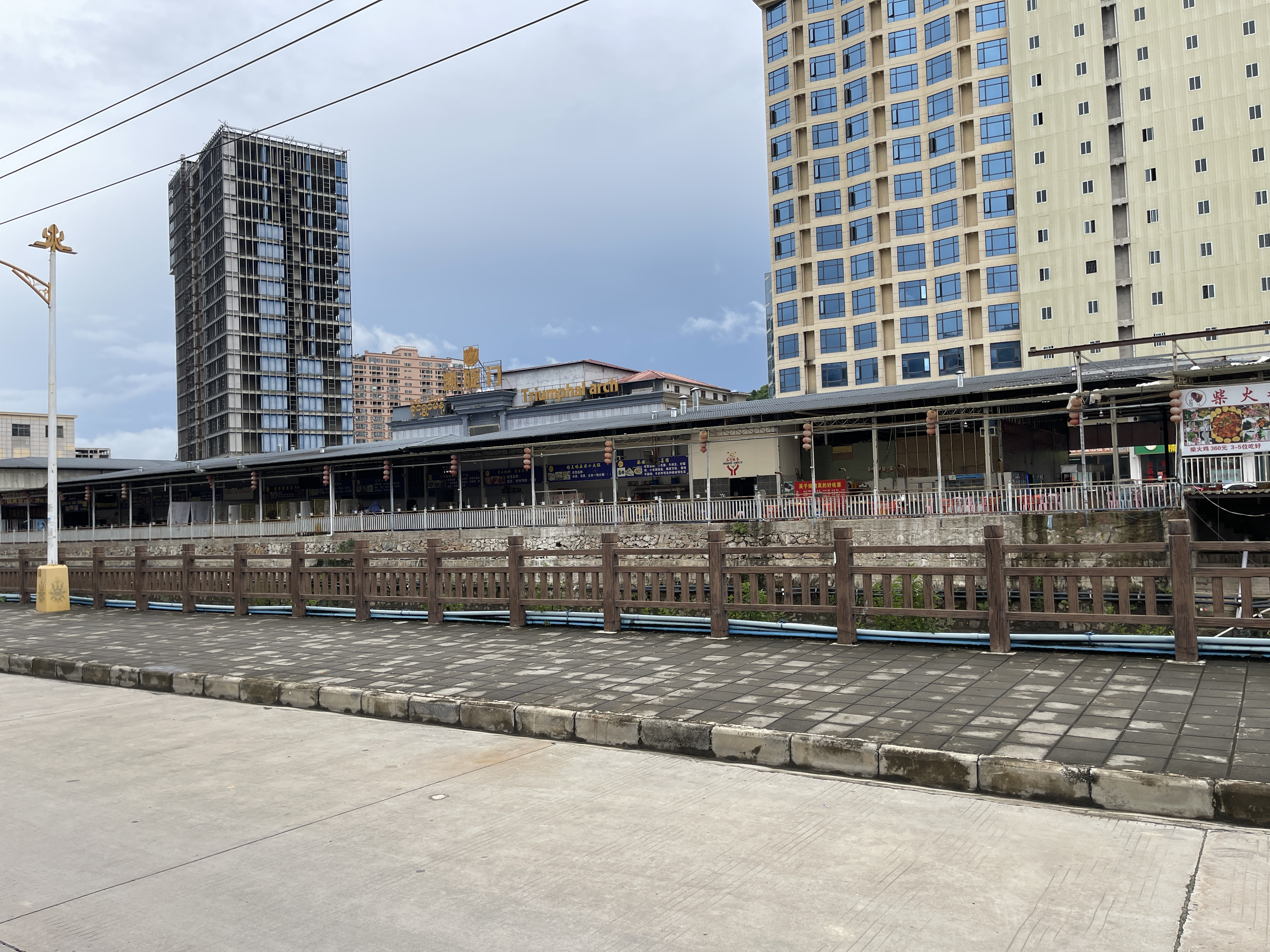
- View of the Triumphal Arch area across the Nanma River in downtown Mong La

- Location in Myanmar
- Coordinates: 21°39′50″N 100°02′24″E
- Country: Myanmar
- State: Shan State
- District: Mong La District
- Township: Mong La Township
- Elevation: 640 m (2,100 ft)
- Time zone: UTC+6:30 (MMT)

Mong La or Mongla (Burmese: မိုင်းလား), also known as Mengla (Chinese: 勐拉, Měnglā), is the capital of Mong La District and the administrative seat of Mong La Township in Shan State, Myanmar.

Mong La is opposite Daluo, a Chinese border town in Yunnan Province, It is about 258 kilometres (160 mi) from the Thai border town of Mae Sai and 80 kilometres (50 mi) north-east of Kengtung, Myanmar.

Although Mong La is in Myanmar, its electricity, telecommunications, other infrastructure, and trade flows are dependent on China. The main currency used in Mong La is the Chinese yuan.

== Name ==
Burmese Maing La (မိုင်းလား, [máɪɰ̃lá]) and Chinese Měnglā (勐拉, [mɤŋlä]) are transcriptions of a Tai name spoken as Miunglaa (မိူင်းလႃး) in Shan and Mueang La (ᦵᦙᦲᧂ ᦟᦱᧉ) in Tai Lue. Local Chinese also refer to the Burmese town as "Little" or "Lesser Mong La" (小勐拉, Xiǎo Měnglā) to distinguish it from "Big" or "Greater" Mengla County in China, with a population of over 300,000. Mengla Town in Jinping County on Yunnan's Vietnamese border also bears the same name but is too distant to cause confusion.

== History ==
Mong La emerged from a small remote village in the 1990s to become a local version of Las Vegas. The National Democratic Alliance Army (NDAA) operates in the Mong La area.

By the 2010s, the area was known as a regional hub for drugs and prostitution. Mong La is located in the Golden Triangle area which is a hub for regional imports of precursor chemicals as well as a site of synthetic drug production. The Sop Lwe river port is an important transit point for both licit and illicit goods along the Mekong River, sitting upstream of the Golden Triangle Special Economic Zone, which is widely identified as a major regional hub for transnational organized crime.

In 1995, the State Law and Order Restoration Council began construction of a replica of Shwedagon Pagoda in Mong La. The pagoda was consecrated in 1997.

Mong La casinos were closed in January 2005 for about a year because of complaints from the Government of China. Mong La has a history of rapid expansion, but in the late 2000s, its economy was in decline. Tourism from Thailand to Mong La resumed in 2012 after the signing of new cease fire agreement between the Burmese military government and the Mong La NDAA in September 2011.

There has been an increase in illegal wildlife trafficking in the region. Mong La has emerged as a significant hub of the pangolin trade; during four visits in 2006, 2009, 2013–2014 and 2015, a total of 42 bags of pangolin scales, 32 whole skins, 16 foetuses or pangolin parts in wine and 27 whole pangolins were observed for sale. Wildlife products from Africa, such as African elephant ivory and white rhino horn, have been observed openly for sale in Mong La, indicating this hub is being used to move such items into China.

There were reports that Chinese company Shanghai Shellpay Internet Technology has planned to construct the Yongbang Blockchain Special Economic Zone (SEZ) in Mong La. In February 2019, the Chinese Embassy in Myanmar released a statement on the creation of Yongbang SEZ. However, Mong La officials have denied that Chinese firms were permitted to set up a blockchain SEZ in the region.

== Gallery ==
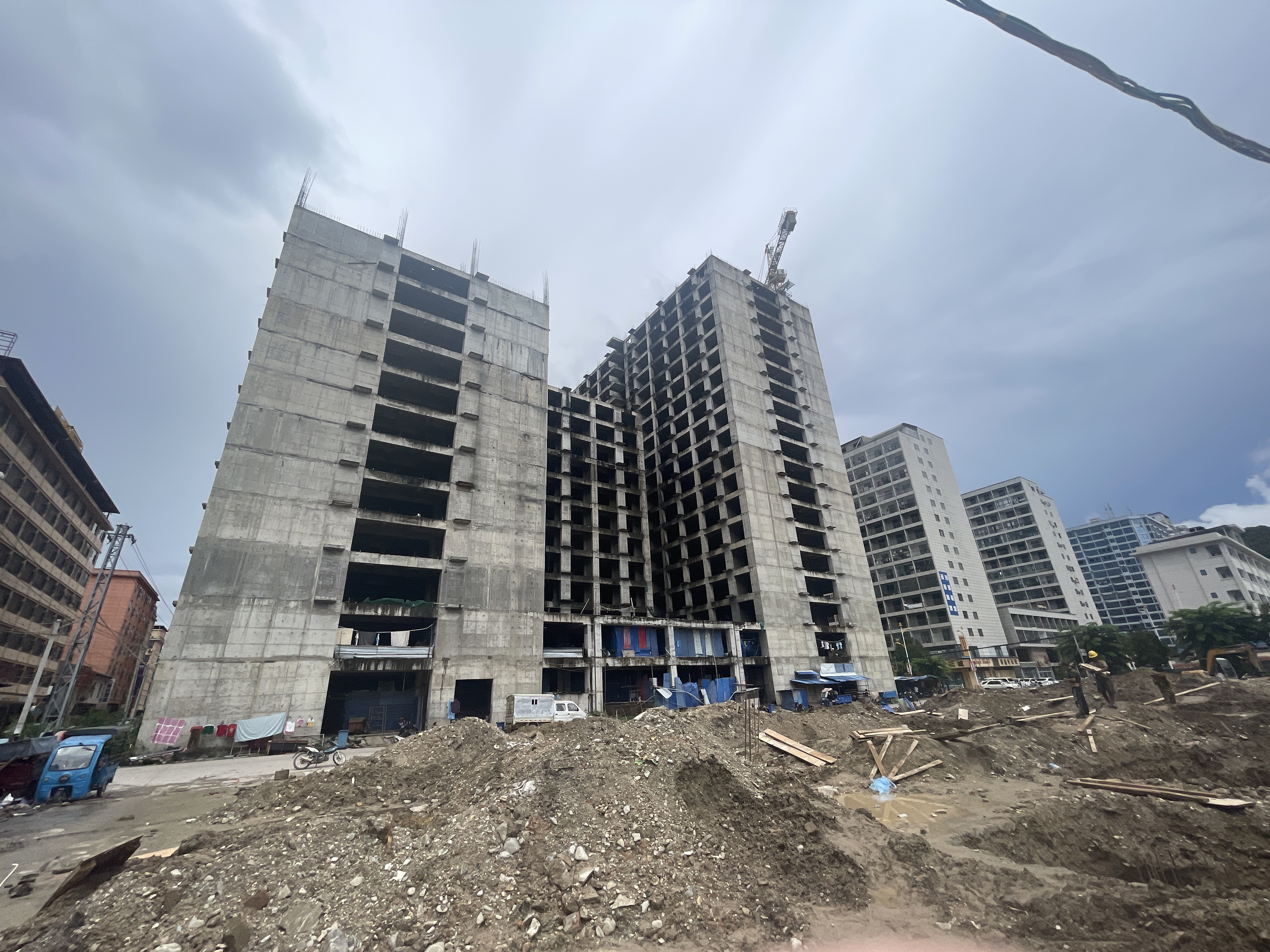
Towers under construction

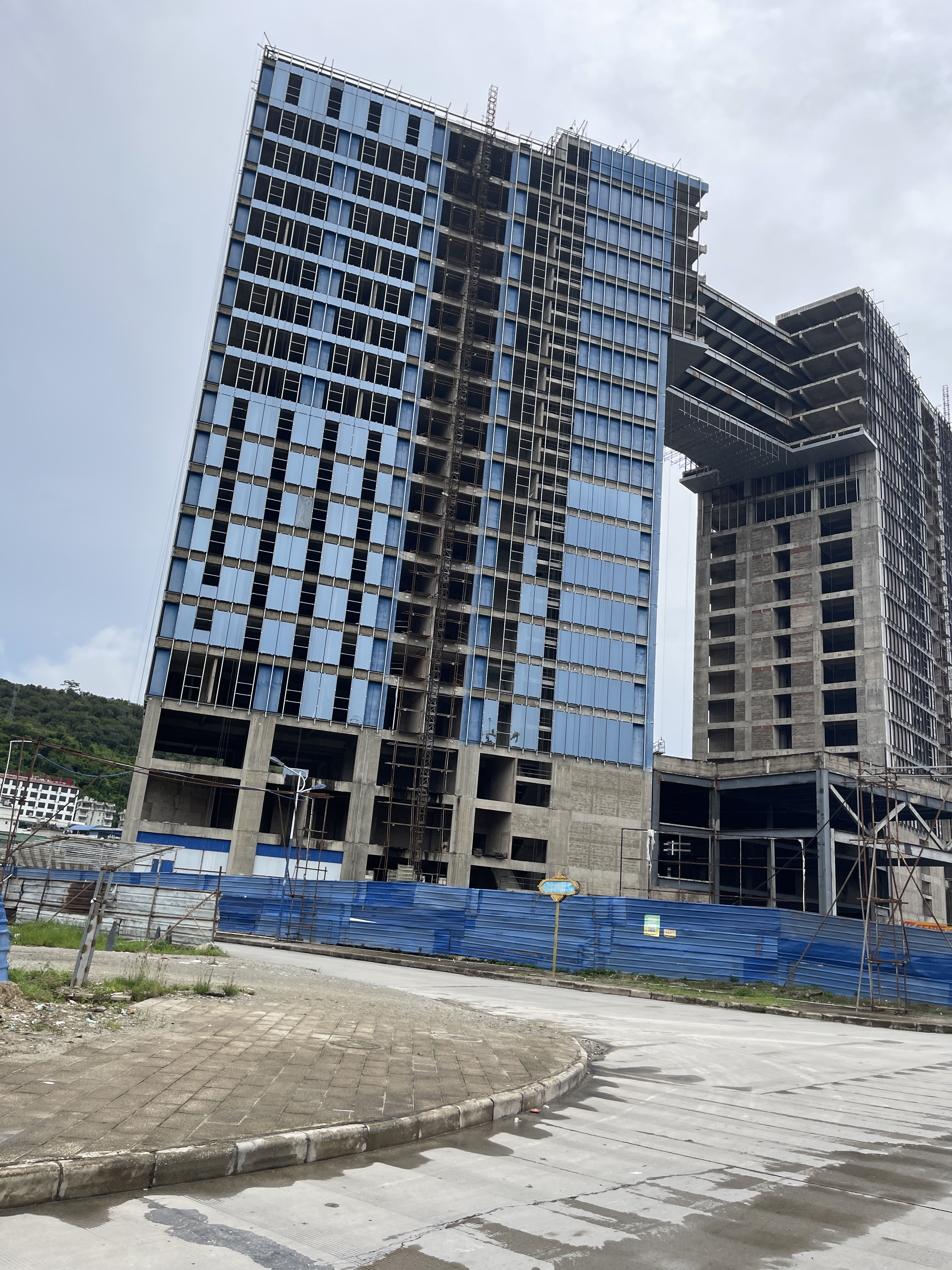
Skyscraper on No. 5 Unity Street

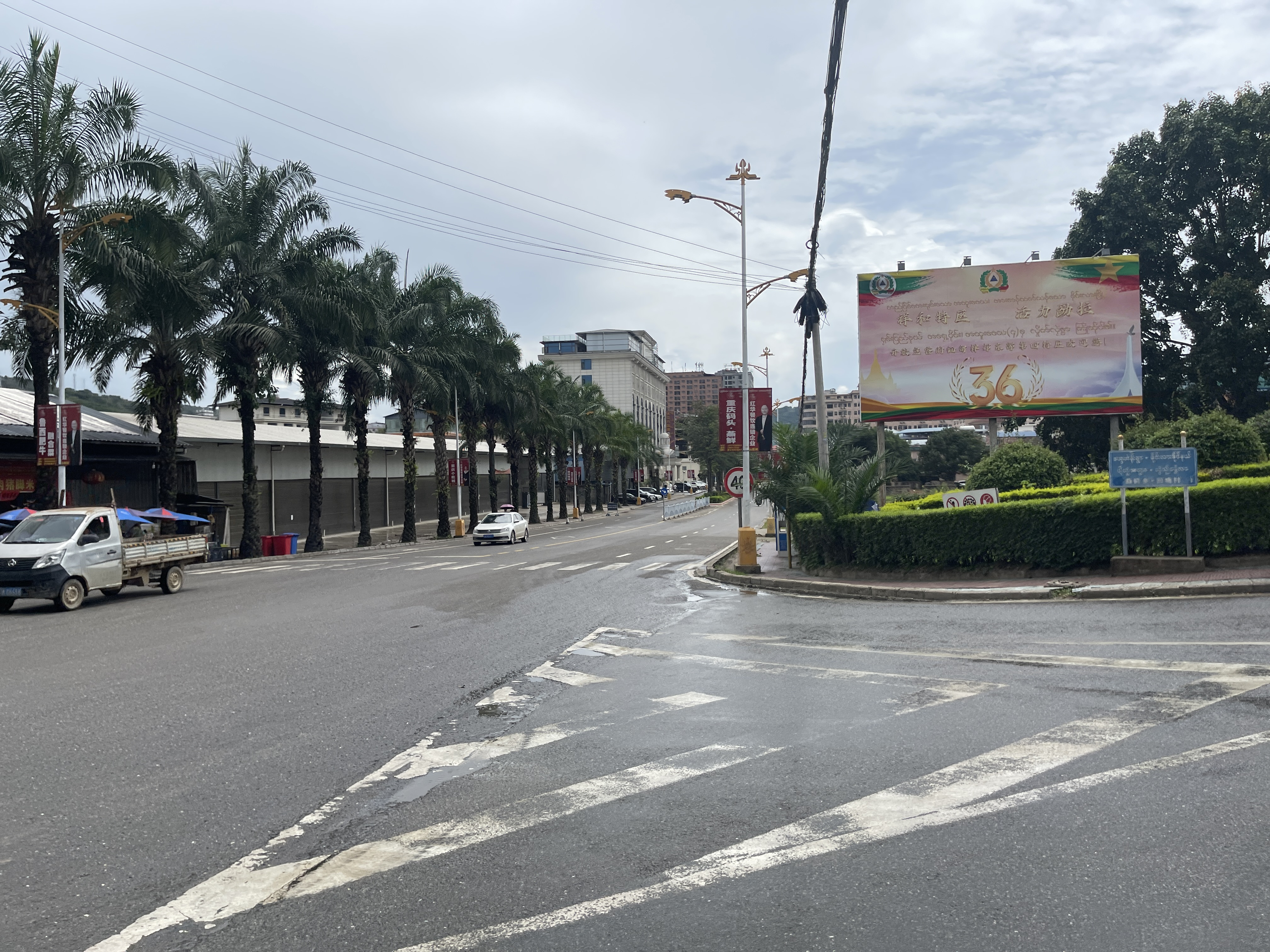
Welcome sign coming in from China

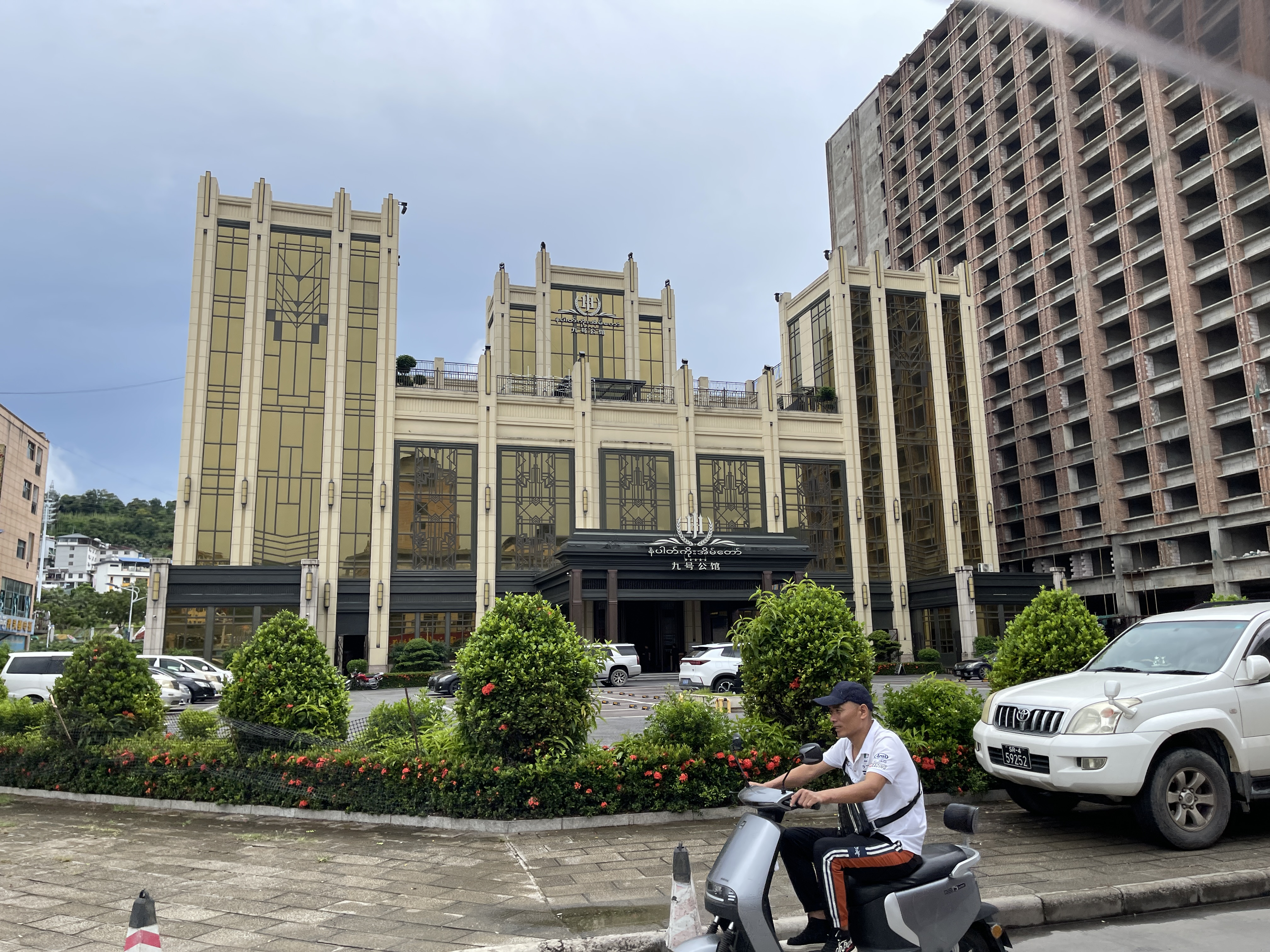
Mansion in downtown Mong La

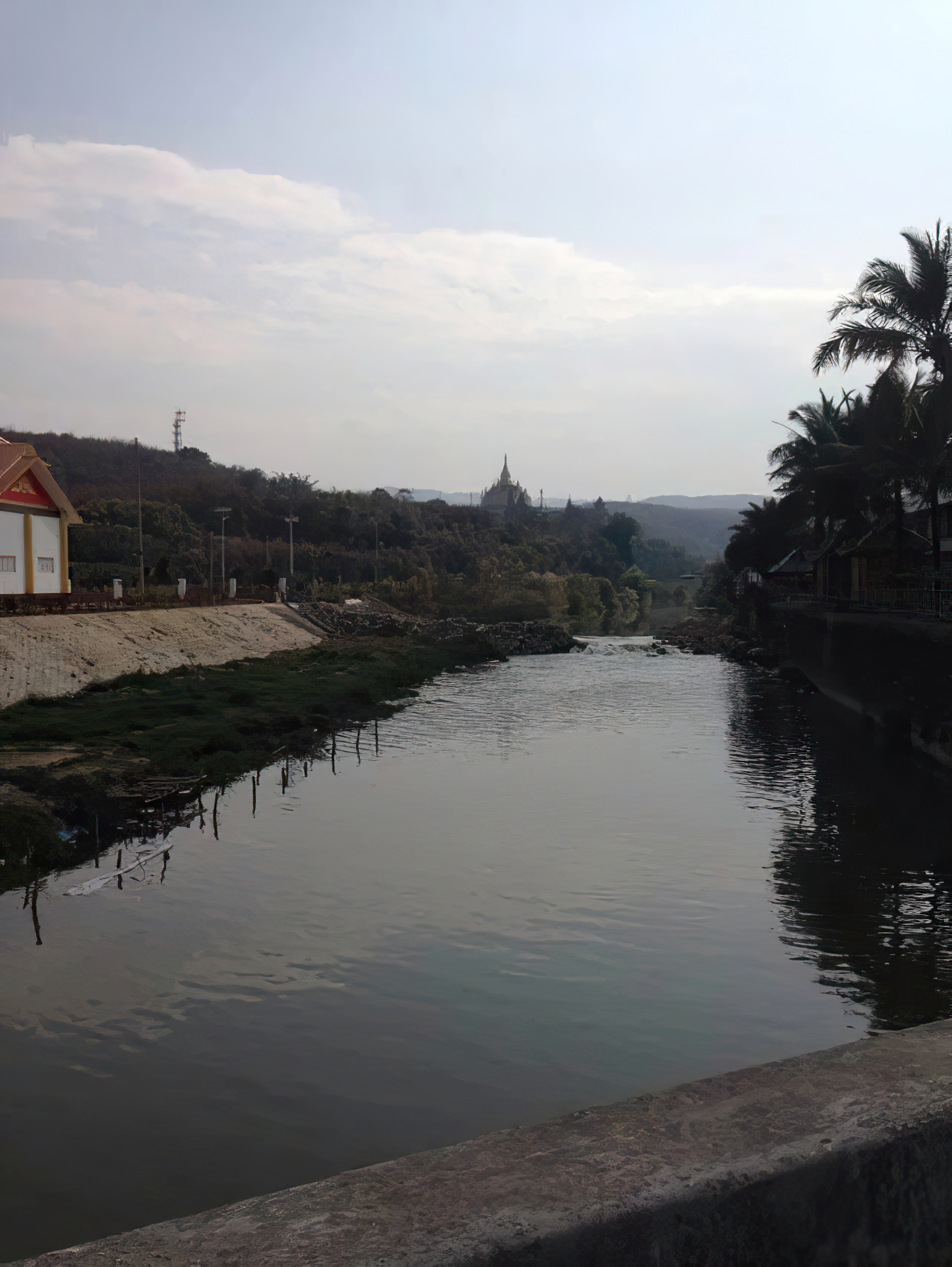
View of Dwenagara Golden Pagoda and Mong La from China

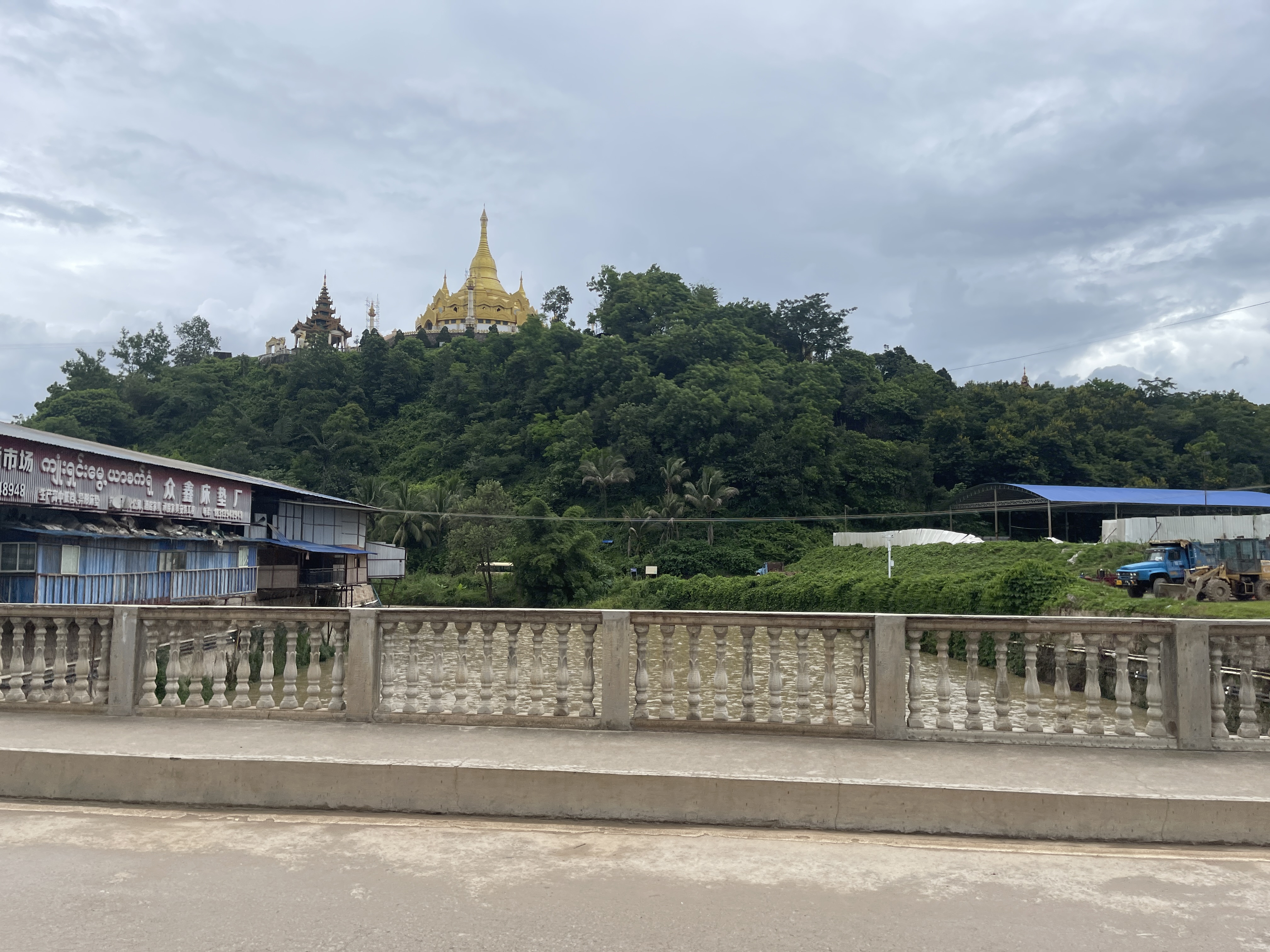
Dwenagara Golden Pagoda

== See also ==
- Special Economic Zone
- Gelephu Special Administrative Region, in Bhutan on border with India
- Dawei SAR, in coastal Myanmar
- Kyaukphyu SAR, in coastal Myanmar
- Thilawa Special Economic Zone, in coastal Myanmar
- Shwe Kokko SAR, in southern Myanmar on border with Thailand
