= Kyaukphyu Special Economic Zone =

Coordinates: 19°23′N 93°36′E

Kyaukphyu Special Economic Zone (Burmese: ကျောက်ဖြူအထူးစီးပွားရေးဇုန်; abbreviated Kyaukphyu SEZ) is a 1,600-hectare (4,000-acre) Burmese special economic zone being developed on Kyaukphyu, Ramree Island, Rakhine State. Kyaukphyu SEZ was first announced in September 2013. The project initially began as a joint venture between the Chinese and Burmese governments, but has since transitioned to private developers. Kyaukphyu SEZ will be accessible to the Shwe gas field in the Bay of Bengal. The oil and gas terminal was financed by the China National Petroleum Corporation which built two pipelines for natural gas and oil.

The Myanmar press reported on the signing of an agreement between the consortium 26 May 2014 in Naypyitaw, led by CPG Consultants and PM Link, and the Kyauk Phyu Special Economic Zone Management Committee for the development of the master plan and management of the tender process for the Kyauk Phyu Economic Zone (SEZ).

The consortium comprises CPG Consultants Pte Ltd, DTZ Debenham Tie Leung (SEA) Pte Ltd, Ernst & Young Solutions LLP, Global Maritime And Port Services Pte Ltd and PM Link Pte Ltd.

== Deep-Sea Port ==
The Kyaukphyu Deep Sea Port is the key component of the Kyaukphyu Special Economic Zone. The SEZ comprises three main projects: the deep-sea port, an industrial park and a residential area. Among these the development of the deep-sea port is the top priority.

The port is being constructed in phases, beginning on Maday Island and later expanding to Ramree Island.

== See also ==
- Kaladan Multi-Modal Transit Transport Project
- Economy of Burma
- Special economic zone
  - Gelephu Special Administrative Region, in Bhutan on border with India
  - Dawei SAR, in coastal Myanmar
  - Thilawa Special Economic Zone, in coastal Myanmar
  - Mong La SAR, in eastcentral Myanmar on border with China
  - Shwe Kokko SAR, in southern Myanmar on border with China
