= Point, Kyaukpyu =

Urban park in Kyaukpyu, Myanmar

Viewpoint
- Interactive map of Viewpoint
- Type: Urban park
- Location: Asoeya Quarter, Kyaukpyu ကလားေတာင္
- Coordinates: 19°25′46″N 93°32′06″E
- Status: Open all year

Viewpoint, popularly known as Point, is the principal attraction in Kyaukpyu, the major town of Rakhine State, Myanmar. Located at the northwesternmost tip of the town, it is an urban park which looks out into where the Bay of Bengal and the mouth of the Thanzit (Kyaukphyu) River meet. Kyaukpyu Viewpoint consists of a sightseeing tower and part of the Kyaukpyu Beach. One of the main roads of Kyaukpyu, the Strand Road, leads to the entrance to Point.

== Attractions ==
The merging of the Kyaukpyu River and the Bay of Bengal can be beautifully viewed from Kyaukpyu Point. The nearby islands are also visible. It also provides an excellent view of both the sunrise and sunset. Viewpoint is a favourite hangout for young couples and other locals.
