= Shwe Gas project =

Natural gas field in the Bay of Bengal

Coordinates: 19°49′56″N 92°36′11″E

Shwe
- Country: Myanmar
- Region: Bay of Bengal
- Location: Rakhine Basin, ~60 km offshore Kyaukphyu
- Block: A-1 and A-3
- Offshore/onshore: offshore
- Operator: POSCO International
- Partners: POSCO International (51%), MOGE (15%), ONGC Videsh (17%), GAIL (8.5%), KOGAS (8.5%)
- Service contractors: China Offshore Oil Engineering Corporation (COOEC)

Field history
- Discovery: 2004
- Start of development: 2007
- Start of production: 2013

Production
- Current production of gas: 20×10^{6} m^{3}/d 700×10^{6} cu ft/d 7.3×10^{9} m^{3}/a (260×10^{9} cu ft/a)
- Year of current production of gas: 2023
- Estimated gas in place: 260×10^{9} m^{3} 9.1×10^{12} cu ft
- Recoverable gas: 60×10^{9} m^{3} (2.1×10^{12} cu ft)
- Producing formations: Rakhine Offshore Formation

The Shwe gas field is a major natural gas field in the Bay of Bengal, located approximately 60 kilometers offshore from Kyaukphyu, in Myanmar’s Rakhine Basin. It spans production blocks A-1 and A-3 and is one of Myanmar’s most significant offshore energy assets.

== History ==
The field was discovered in 2004 by South Korea’s Daewoo International, which was later acquired by POSCO International. Initial development began in 2007 and the field came online in 2013. The name "Shwe" means "gold" in Burmese, reflecting the field’s high economic value.

== Ownership ==
The project is led by POSCO International, which holds a 51% stake. Other joint venture partners include:

- Myanmar Oil and Gas Enterprise (MOGE) – 15%
- ONGC Videsh – 17%
- GAIL (India) Limited – 8.5%
- Korea Gas Corporation (KOGAS) – 8.5%

== Reserves and Production ==
The Shwe field initially contained approximately 9.1 trillion cubic feet (260 billion cubic meters) of proven reserves. By 2023, an estimated 60 billion cubic meters of recoverable gas remained.

It produces around 700 million cubic feet (20 million cubic meters) of gas per day, with most of it exported to China via the Sino-Myanmar Gas Pipeline.

== Export Infrastructure ==
The Shwe field is connected to the mainland via a subsea pipeline that feeds into the Sino-Myanmar pipelines at Kyaukphyu. The gas pipeline spans over 2,500 kilometers, delivering gas to China’s Yunnan Province. This pipeline infrastructure plays a key role in China’s energy diversification strategy.

== Phase 2 Expansion ==
In July 2024, a $523 million development contract was awarded to China Offshore Oil Engineering Corporation (COOEC) to support Phase 2 expansion of the Shwe project. The work includes installing new wellhead platforms, subsea pipelines, and processing facilities, with completion expected in 2027.

== Controversies ==
The Shwe project has drawn criticism from international human rights groups for its alleged impacts on local communities and the environment. Reports by EarthRights International and the Shwe Gas Movement have highlighted:

- Forced relocation of residents
- Land confiscation without adequate compensation
- Environmental degradation from construction and pipeline operations
- Lack of transparency and benefit-sharing with local populations

Following the 2021 military coup in Myanmar, the involvement of state-owned MOGE has also drawn international sanctions and calls for divestment by civil society groups.

== Economic Impact ==
The Shwe gas field is one of Myanmar’s largest sources of foreign revenue. The majority of gas produced is exported to China under long-term contracts, with limited domestic use. It has contributed significantly to infrastructure development around Kyaukphyu and strengthened strategic ties between Myanmar and China.

== See also ==
- Kyaukpyu Township
- Sino-Myanmar pipelines
- Energy in Myanmar
- POSCO International
