= Kyaukphyu Township =

Township in Rakhine State, Burma

Coordinates: 19°20′41″N 93°41′01″E

Kyaukphyu Township ကျောက်ဖြူမြို့နယ်
- Township
- Location in Kyaukphyu district
- Country: Myanmar
- State: Rakhine State
- District: Kyaukphyu District
- Capital: Kyaukphyu
- Time zone: UTC+6:30 (MMT)

Kyaukphyu Township (Burmese: ကျောက်ဖြူမြို့နယ်, also spelt Kyaukpyu Township) is a township of Kyaukphyu District in the Rakhine State of Myanmar. The principal town is Kyaukphyu.

At Ma Day Island of Kyaukpyu Township, a deep-sea port was being built by Aisa World Company with investment by China National Petroleum Corporation.

== Kyaukphyu Special Economic Zone ==
The Kyaukphyu SEZ plan included an industrial zone, residential housing estates and a deep-water port and to cover about 11 miles (18 km) near Sit Taw and Si Maw Village. 1,200 kilometres (750 mi) roadway and railway will link the SEZ and Yunnan Province of China. But it will be relocated near Kani village because of finding an active mud volcano in the initially planned area. Nippon Koei, China's CITIC group and Burma's Htoo Trading are expected to investment this project. CPG Consultancy Ltd., a Singaporean company, is appointed as adviser in selection of investment proposals.

== Shwe Gas Project ==
It is one of the Burma's largest natural gas projects. A USD 3 billion gas pipeline and onshore tanker terminal project was built by Daewoo, China National Petroleum Corporation and Burma's state-owned Myanmar Oil and Gas Enterprise. It can pump about 12 billion cubic meters of gas annually to Kunming, Yunnan Province of China. It is planned to pump 22 million tonnes of crude oil annually. The dual oil and gas pipelines run over 800 kilometres (500 mi)from Kyaukphyu to Kunming.

== See also ==
- Sino-Burma pipelines
