= China–Myanmar Economic Corridor =

Infrastructure project in Myanmar

The CMEC will give China an outlet in the Indian Ocean

China–Myanmar Economic Corridor (CMEC) is a number of infrastructure projects supporting connectivity between Myanmar and China. It is an economic corridor of the Belt and Road Initiative.

== Transportation ==
The infrastructure development plan calls for building road and rail transportation from Yunnan Province in China through Muse and Mandalay to the seaport city of Kyaukpyu in Rakhine State. The transportation route follows gas and oil pipelines built in 2013 and 2017. At the end of the route, a port and Special Economic Zone is planned at Khaukphyu. The largest construction project along the route is the 431-kilometre (268 mi) Muse-Mandalay Railway, a project estimated to cost US$9 billion. The newly built railway would connect to the Chinese railway network at Ruili, Yunnan Province.

== Core zones ==
An important part of the corridor will be three core zones at the border of both countries. The core zones will be commercial areas with duty-free concessions, hotels, manufacturing, and financial services. According to a policy plan in 2019 by the Myanmar Ministry of Commerce, the locations for the core zones would be Muse and Chinshwehaw in the northern part of Shan State and Kan Pite Tee in Kachin State.
