= Ramree dialect =

Rakhine dialect of Burma

Ramree
- Yangbye
- Pronunciation: [jáɰ̃bjɛ́ bàðà zəɡá]
- Native to: Rakhine State
- Region: Ramree Island, South Arakan Coast, Irrawaddy Division, Bangladesh
- Native speakers: (810,000 cited 1983)
- Language family: Sino-Tibetan: (Tibeto-Burman); Lolo–Burmese; Burmish; Burmic; Burmese; Rakhine; Ramree

Language codes
- ISO 639-3: ybd (retired and subsumed into rki)
- Glottolog: (insufficiently attested or not a distinct language) yang1301

Ramree (Burmese: ရမ်းဗြဲဘာသာစကား, Burmese pronunciation: [jáɰ̃bjɛ́ bàðà zəɡá], also spelt Yanbye or Ranbre) is the main dialect of the Rakhine language spoken in southern Rakhine State of Burma (Myanmar), especially in the areas surrounding Ramree Island, the Awagyun Island and southern coastal regions in Bangladesh. Ramree language is also widely spoken along the western coastline of Irrawaddy Division.

== See also ==
- Burmese language
- Burmese dialects
