= Ramree =

Ramree ရမ်းဗြဲ: Yan Bye; Ramri
- Town
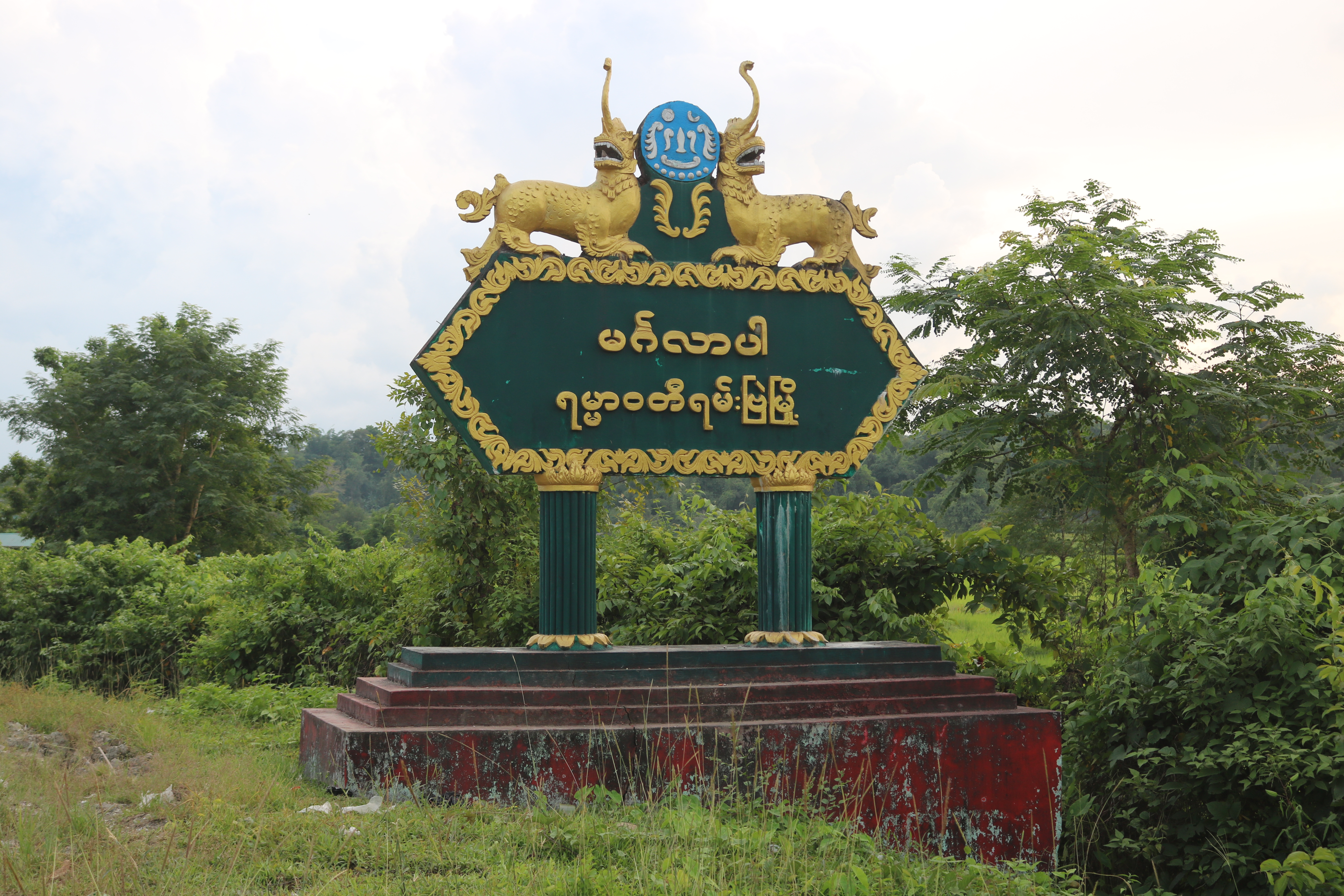

- Location in Myanmar (Burma)
- Coordinates: 19°05′N 93°52′E
- Country: Myanmar
- Division: Rakhine State
- District: Kyaukpyu District
- Township: Ramree Township
- Elevation: 22 ft (6.7 m)

Population (2014)
  - Total: 9,581
  - Ethnicities: Rakhine Bamar Chin Kaman and others
  - Religions: Buddhism Christianity Islam
- Demonym: Ram Bray Thar
- Time zone: UTC+6.30 (MMT)
- Climate: Am

Ramree (Burmese: ရမ်းဗြဲမြို့, Burmese pronunciation: [jáɰ̃bjɛ́ mjo̰]), also called Yanbye (ရမ်းပြည့်), with its classical name being Rammāvatī (ရမ္မာဝတီ), is a town in Kyaukpyu District, Rakhine State, Myanmar. Ramree is situated on Ramree Island, the largest island in Myanmar. Ramree is the capital of the township of the same name and former capital of the district of Ramree (until 1852 ). It is close to the east coast of the Ramree island, about 25 kilometres (16 mi) north of the Tan River. The population of Ramree (Yanbye) urban area is 9,581 as of 2014, while Ramree Township's population is 97,891. The town was captured by the Arakan Army in March 2024 from the Tatmadaw during the ongoing Myanmar civil war.

== Etymology ==
The name "Ramree" (ရမ်းဗြဲ) is derived from the former name of island: Ramarwaddy (ရမ္မာဝတီ) which meant Pleasant Region (Rammar= Pleasant) (Wati = Region). The administrative town of Rammar Wati was called "Rammar Wati Pri Myo" and then acronymic way, town's name was shorten to Ram Pri Myo (ရမ်ပြည်မြို့) which was heard by Portuguese firstly landed Europeans to this town as Rama Ree or Rama Ri and later it was noted as Ramri or Ramree.

== History ==
Ramree is regarded as one of the notable ancient towns in Rakhine history. The last king of the Arakan Kingdom, Mahathamada Raza is said to have risen from being the governor of Ramree before becoming the king of Arakan. According to Rakhine chronicles, two famous women are also connected to the Ramree region: Queen Mya Thanta, the consort of Mahathamada Raza and Queen Saw Mei Kyi, the consort of King Min Ba.

Following the conquest of Arakan by Konbaung dynasty, the Burmese kings administered the region through appointed governors. During that time, heavy taxation and forced recruitment of local people for wars against Siam (now Thailand) caused severe hardship for the local population.

In 1826, after the First Anglo-Burmese War, Arakan came under British control together with Tenasserim. During the early British period, Ramree became a district headquarters administered by a British officer. Later, in 1852, the British combined Ramree and Ann districts into Kyaukphyu District and moved the district headquarters from Ramree to Kyaukphyu. As a result, Ramree became only a township-level administrative center. When the British first began administering Ramree, the town had a population of only 3,892 people.

In 1945, Ramree was the site of a battle between the XV Indian Corps and Japanese soldiers during World War II, resulting in the defeat of the Japanese who had been in control of the town and the island since 1942.

=== Contemporary era ===
The town was the site of a battle between the Arakan Army (AA) and the ruling military junta during Myanmar's civil war. Fighting began in December 2023 and continued for several weeks. On 7 March 2024, it was reported that the Arakan Army had seized Ramree and the surrounding township, with the AA giving confirmation of their success through a statement released on 11 March.

Ramree suffered large destruction of heavily bombing by the Burmese Military.
