= Myanma Oil and Gas Enterprise =

State-owned oil company

- Native name: မြန်မာ့ရေနံနှင့် သဘာဝဓါတ်ငွေ့လုပ်ငန်း
- Type: Public
- Industry: Oil and gas industry
- Founded: 1963; 63 years ago
- Headquarters: Naypyidaw, Myanmar
- Products: Petroleum; Natural gas Petroleum products
- Owner: Myanmar Government

Myanma Oil and Gas Enterprise (Burmese: မြန်မာ့ရေနံနှင့် သဘာဝဓါတ်ငွေ့လုပ်ငန်း; abbreviated MOGE) is a national oil and gas company of Myanmar. It was established in 1963. MOGE royalties and fees are estimated to generate US$1.5 billion in annual revenues, about half of the country's foreign currency reserves. The company is the country's sole operator of oil and gas exploration and production, as well as domestic gas transmission through a 1,200 miles (1,900 km) onshore pipeline grid.

== History ==
MOGE was established in 1963 after nationalisation of the Burmese petroleum industry. The nationalised assets of Burmah Oil Company were amalgamated to MOGE.

MOGE discovered the Mann oil field in 1970. Peak production in 1979 was 23,000 barrels of oil per day, about three-quarters of Myanmar's total production.

On 31 October 2023, the United States imposed sanctions on MOGE prohibiting specified financial services, to reduce the amount of revenue going into the military regime, to become effective on 15 December 2023.

MOGE owns 49.1% of the crude oil pipeline which connects Made Island in Ralhine State with the Yunnan Province in China, China National Petroleum Corporation (CNPC) owns the remaining 50.9%.

On 1 April 2024, Chevron withdrew from the Yadana gas field and MOGE’s stake increased from 21.8% to 37.4%, while PTT Exploration and Production Public Co. Ltd. (PTTEP) holds the remaining 62.96%.

In March 2025, Switzerland included MOGE in its financial sanctions against Myanmar, following the 2022 EU sanctions. The sanctions came into effect on 11 March 2025.

MOGE signed a production-sharing contract (PSC) with Gulf Petroleum Myanmar on 29 May 2025 for offshore Block M-10, which is part of the Min Ye Thu project. Production is intended to begin in 2028.

In October 2025, planning began for additional drilling activities in Blocks M-5 and M-6 to begin in on 1 November 2025 and run until March 2027. The new offshore blocks in Mottama Gulf are part of the partnership between MOGE and PTTEP.

=== 2021 coup ===
Since the 2021 Myanmar coup d'état, MOGE has become the largest foreign currency source for the military regime, the State Administration Council. In February 2022, the European Union imposed sanctions on MOGE. In January 2023, the American government sanctioned MOGE officials. As of January 2023, neither the United States nor the United Kingdom have sanctioned MOGE.

In January 2022, TotalEnergies, Chevron, and Woodside Energy announced they would withdraw from the Myanmar market, following pressure from activists who have called for companies to cut financial ties with MOGE. TotalEnergies had operated the Yadana natural gas pipeline project since the 1990s, with a 31.24% stake in the project, while Chevron had a 28.26% stake. TotalEnergies' divestment has increased MOGE's stake in the project, from 15% to 21.8%. Australian-owned Woodside took a US$138 million loss from its exit.

In February 2022, Japanese-owned Mitsubishi Group announced its exit. In April 2022, Malaysian-owned Petronas followed suit, withdrawing from the Yetagun gas field project.

== Offshore gas fields ==
MOGE operates several offshore gas fields, and has a commercial stake in each active project:

- Shwe gas field (15% MOGE stake) – operated by Korean-owned POSCO International (formerly Australian-owned Woodside Energy)
- Yadana gas field (21.8% MOGE stake) – operated by Thai-owned PTTEP (formerly French-owned TotalEnergies)
- Zawtika gas field (20% MOGE stake) – operated by Thai-owned PTTEP
- Yetagun gas field (20.5% MOGE stake) – operated by Thai-owned Gas Petroleum Myanmar (formerly Malaysian-owned Petronas)

== See also ==
- Burmah Oil
- Burmah Castrol
- Padma Oil Company (formerly Burmah Eastern)
