= Kyaukphyu District =

District of Rakhine State, Myanmar

Coordinates: 20°00′N 94°00′E

Kyaukphyu District (Burmese: ကျောက်ဖြူခရိုင်, also spelt Kyaukpyu District) is a district of Rakhine State in western Myanmar. The town of Kyaukphyu is the capital of the district.

Location in Rakhine State

== Etymology ==
The name Kyaukpyu (lit. "white rock") is the Burmese pronunciation. In the local Rangbre pronunciation of the natives of Kyaukpyu and in standard Arakanese, the district's name is pronounced "Kyaukpru".

== Geography ==
Kyaukpyu is a district in the Arakan division of Lower Burma, on the eastern coast of the Bay of Bengal. It consists of, first, a strip of mainland along the Bay of Bengal, extending from the An pass, across the main range, to the Ma-ī River, and, secondly, the large islands of Ramree and Cheduba, with many others to the south, lying off the coast of Sandoway. The mainland in the north and east is highly mountainous and forest-clad, and the lower portion is cut up into numerous islands by a network of tidal creeks. Between the mainland and Ramree lies a group of islands separated by deep, narrow, salt-water inlets, forming the north-eastern shore of Kyaukpyu harbour, which extends for nearly 30 m. along Ramree in a south-easterly direction, and has an average breadth of 3 m. The principal mountains are the Arakan Mountains, which send out spurs and sub-spurs almost to the sea-coast. The An pass, an important trade route, rises to a height of 4664 ft. above sea-level. The Dha-let and the An rivers are navigable by large boats for 25 and 45 m. respectively. Above these distances they are mere mountain torrents. Large forests of valuable timber cover an area of about 650 sq. m. Kyaukpyu contains numerous “mud volcanoes,” from which marsh gas is frequently discharged, with occasional issue of flame. The largest of these is situated in the centre of Cheduba Island.

Area 4387 sq. m.; pop. (2024), 229,213, showing a decrease in the decade of 0.29%.

== Mineral resources ==
Earth-oil wells exist in several places in the district. The oil when brought to the surface has the appearance of a whitish-blue water, which gives out brilliant straw-coloured rays, and emits a strong pungent odour. Limestone, iron and coal are also found.

== Townships ==
In 2022, two townships formerly part of Kyaukphyu District were split off new districts. Ann Township became part of Ann District and Manaung Township became part of Taungup District.

Currently, the district contains the following townships:

- Kyaukpyu Township
- Ramree Township
