= Ramree Island =

Ramree Island ရမ်းဗြဲကျွန်း
- Island
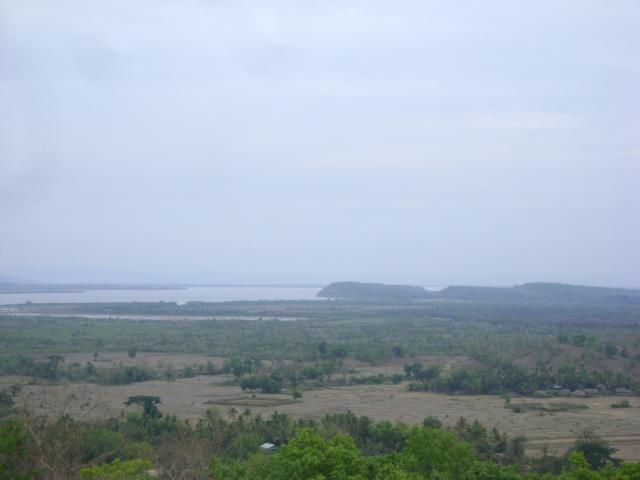
- View of Thun Site River from Ramree Island

- Location within Myanmar
- Coordinates: 19.07120°N 93.81702°E
- Country: Myanmar
- Division: Rakhine State

Area
  - Total: 1,350 km^{2} (520 sq mi)
- Elevation: 300 m (984 ft)
- Time zone: UTC+6:30 (MMT)

Ramree Island (Burmese: ရမ်းဗြဲကျွန်း; also spelled Yanbye Island) is an island off the coast of Rakhine State, Myanmar (Burma). Ramree island is the largest island on the entire Arakan coast and in Myanmar. The area of the island is about 1,350 square kilometres (520 sq mi) and the main populated center is Ramree. The district on Ramree island is Kyaukpyu district, and Kyaukpyu is a major town and the second capital of Rakhine State.

== Etymology ==
The island is historically known by several names which includes "Wan Bae Island" – allegedly because its shape resembled a duck, and also was called "Ram Byay" and "Rammavati". The Ramree town was built in a flat area surrounded by mountains so that enemies could not easily enter or observe it. In the Burmese language it is known as Yanbye Island.

== Geography ==
The island is connected to the mainland by an isthmus, which is only 150 metres (490 ft) wide on average. The highest point is Zikha Taung, a 984 feet (300 m) high mountain located near the western shore in the southern part of the island. There are mud volcanoes present on the island.

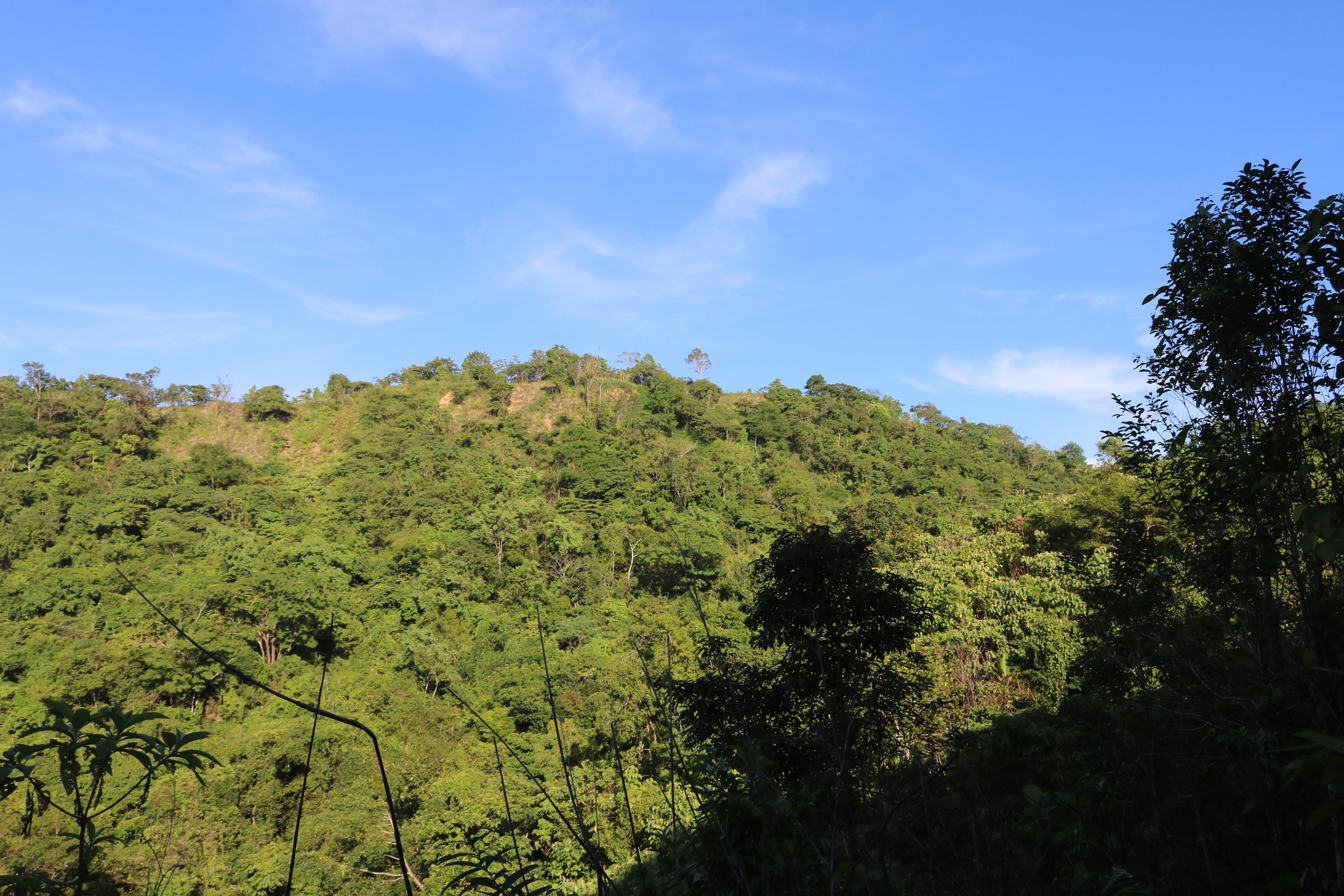
Zikha Taung, the highest point on Ramree Island

=== Nearby islands ===
- Sagu Kyun is a 5-kilometre (3.1 mi) long and 4-kilometre (2.5 mi) wide island located off the southern cape of Ramree, separated from it by a 2.4-kilometre (1.5 mi) wide strait.
- Magyi Kyun is a 2.2-kilometre (1.4 mi) long islet off the southern end of Sagu Kyun.
- Cheduba Island lies further offshore, about 10 kilometres (6.2 mi) from the south-western coast of Ramree Island.

== History ==
Originally, the island was a trading post for the Kingdom of Mrauk U, with fishing villages spread across it.

Ramree was the homeland of the last ruler of Mrauk U, Maha Thammada.

During World War II the Battle of Ramree Island was fought in January and February 1945, as part of the British 14th Army 1944–45 offensive on the Southern Front of the Burma campaign. At the close of the battle, Japanese soldiers were forced into the marshes surrounding the island, and saltwater crocodiles are claimed to have eaten 400 (or 980 of them, as only twenty survived, according to one account) — in what the Guinness World Records has listed as "The Greatest Disaster Suffered [by humans] from Animals". This version has been disputed; that, while a small number of Japanese soldiers were likely killed by crocodiles, the vast majority likely died due to a variety of other reasons including dehydration, drowning, British gunfire, dysentery, and perhaps even a small number to sharks.

== Wildlife ==
=== Crocodiles ===
Saltwater crocodiles were still common in the Ramree Island region into the 1960s, but the region no longer supports a viable population of crocodiles, likely due to hide-hunting, and by the early 1980s evidence suggested only scattered individuals remained.

=== Other Animals ===
Red-whiskered bulbul are native to the island. Lycaria westermanni is also native to the island.

== Pipeline ==
Ramree Island is also the location of a gas pipeline system that transports oil and gas from the Indian Ocean coast to the province of Yunnan in China. From a deep-water port on Kyaukphyu in Rakhine State and from Ramree Island, oil from the Middle East and gas from Myanmar's ocean coast is transported through the pipelines to China. The pipelines enable China to rely less on ocean-transported oil and gas through the treacherous Strait of Malacca and also cut two weeks off the transport time. The pipeline transport fees are a source of revenue for the Burmese government, on top of the sale of the gas. Construction began in 2012. The Myanmar section of the gas pipeline was completed on 12 June 2013 and gas started to flow to China on 21 October 2013. The oil pipeline was completed in August 2014.

== See also ==
- List of islands of Myanmar
