= Timeline of the Myanmar civil war (2021–present) =

The following is a timeline of major events during the Myanmar civil war (2021–present), following the 2021 military coup d'état and protests. It was also a renewed intensity of the existing Myanmar conflict.

== 2021 ==
=== January ===
- 25 Jaunary – A week before the coup d'etat, the Myanmar Army LIB 575 clashed with the Restoration Council of Shan State (RCSS) in Mong Pan Township. No casualties were reported. RCSS spokesperson, Oum Khur, claimed that the attack violated the Nationwide Ceasefire Agreement.

=== February ===
- 5 February – The MNDAA attempted an assassination of Bai Yingneng in an ambush against the Kokang Border Guard Forces. Although Bai was unharmed, three bodyguards and nine civilians died.
- 9 February – According to RCSS major, Kham San, the junta attacked RCSS camps in Hsipaw Township.
- 22 February – The Tatmadaw junta attacked a base belonging to the Kachin Independence Army (KIA) Brigade 6, Battalion 9 in Muse District, Shan State.

=== March ===
- 11 March – The KIA attacked a military base near Sal Zin, Mohnyin District, triggering an airstrike from junta fighter jets.
- 12 March – The KIA attacked a military base in Mogaung Township, triggering a counterattack from the junta involving helicopters. Four children were injured in Nant Haing village.
- 14 March – Protestors in Hlaingthaya Township's Hlaing River Road, a major thoroughfare, set up cement and sandbag barriers. Approximately 200 soldiers under the command of Lieutenant Colonel Nyunt Win Swe of the Myanmar Army Yangon Command breached the barriers and kettled protestors, killing at least 65 people.
- 25 March – The KIA seized the military base of Alaw Bum near the town of Laiza during the Battle of Alaw Bum airbase.
- 27 March – The Karen National Liberation Army (KNLA) attacked a military base, killing 10 soldiers and taking others hostage in the first attack on the military since the protests began.
- 28 March –
  - Dozens of protesters travel to Myanmar's border areas to enlist in and train under one of the country's many insurgent groups, elevating the risk of a countrywide civil war.
  - The first day of openly armed resistance against the coup, when armed protesters in the town of Kalay fought back against soldiers and security forces attacking a protest camp, with clashes also taking place in villages in Kale township.
- 30 March –
  - The Committee Representing Pyidaungsu Hluttaw proposed the formation of a "federal armed force" to combat the military.
  - The Arakan Army (AA) threatened to end its ceasefire with the military should the latter "persist in massacring civilians".
  - Protesters increasingly began arming themselves with homemade weapons such as guns in an attempt to defend themselves against attacks by the military. Simultaneously, clashes with soldiers and IED attacks against administrative buildings and police stations became more common as the trend of protesters using armed resistance rose.

=== April ===
- 4 April – Seven insurgent groups who were signatories to the Nationwide Ceasefire Agreement aligned themselves with the Committee Representing Pyidaungsu Hluttaw, including the All Burma Student Democratic Front and the Karen National Union.
- 8 April – Taze became another frequent site of clashes when protesters fought back against soldiers with hunting rifles and firebombs in a battle that resulted in 11 protesters' deaths. In the same day, the country had surpassed 600 deaths related to anti-coup protests since 1 February.
- 10 April – The Northern Alliance, comprising the Arakan Army, the Ta'ang National Liberation Army and the Myanmar National Democratic Alliance Army, attacked a police station in Naungmon, Shan State, killing at least 10 police officers.
- 11 April – Battle of Alaw Bum- the junta launched a counter-attack to recapture the Alaw Bum base from the KIA using airstrikes and ground troops but had to retreat amidst heavy casualties.
- 16 April – Pro-democracy politician Min Ko Naing announced the formation of the National Unity Government (NUG), with ethnic minority politicians in senior roles. Ousted leaders Aung San Suu Kyi and Win Myint retained their positions. Min Ko Naing also asked the international community for recognition over the junta.
- 26 April –
  - The Chinland Defense Force (CDF) began an armed resistance in Mindat, Chin State. In response, the junta cut off food and water supplies and declared martial law.
  - Fighting began when a group of demonstrators outside the town's Aung San statue requested the release of six of their arrested colleagues, when a soldier of the regime allegedly fired at someone, prompting protesters to react.

=== May ===
- 5 May – The National Unity Government declared the formation of an armed wing, the People's Defence Force (PDF), to protect its supporters from military junta attacks and as a first step towards a Federal Union Army.
- 23 May – The People's Defence Force clashed with the Tatmadaw in the town of Muse, killing at least 13 members of Myanmar's security forces.
- 26 May –
  - Six Tatmadaw soldiers were killed in an ambush by the Chinland Defense Force in Hakha, Chin State.
  - The Tatmadaw launched airstrikes in Kayin State in response to the Karen National Liberation Army's capture and scorching of a Tatmadaw military base.
  - Members of the Karenni People's Defence Force (KPDF) in Kayah State also captured and destroyed several Tatmadaw outposts near the state capital of Loikaw.
  - The second-in-command of the Shanni Nationalities Army, Major General Sao Khun Kyaw was assassinated by the Myanmar Army.
- 29 and 30 May – The Tatmadaw used artillery and helicopters to strike PDF and KPDF positions in Loikaw and Demoso.
- 30 May – The Kachin Independence Army joined the anti-coup People's Defence Force battling junta troops in Katha Township, killing eight regime soldiers. Fighting was also continuing in Putao, Hpakant and Momauk Township.

=== June ===
- 1 to 3 June – Fighting erupted in Myawaddy District in which the military and Karen Border Guard Force (BGF), battling against a combined force of Karen ethnic armed groups and PDF, had left dozens of junta troops killed.
- 5 June –
  - Four villagers in Kyonpyaw Township, Ayeyarwady Region, were shot dead after locals confront junta troops with slingshots and homemade gas.
  - Three resistance fighters died, and 40 civilians were arrested after three bomb explosions in Hakha, the capital of Chin State
  - Junta detained villagers in Putao Township and NLD party officials in Bhamo.
- 6 June –
  - Houses and a Catholic church in Dawngakar, Demoso Township were damaged by shelling.
  - Junta troops loot local grocery stores in Mongpai; houses were set on fire afterward.
- 9 June – A Kani PDF ambush on the Monywa-Kalewa highway, carried out with mines and small arms, reportedly killed and wounded a total of 20 Tatmadaw junta troops. Heavy rains eventually made the rebels cease shooting.
- 22 June – Junta forces using armoured vehicles raided a safehouse of the PDF in Mandalay, detaining a number of fighters.
- 30 June – Junta released 2,296 detainees, including journalists and protestors. Most detainees released were arrested due to the protests and more than 4,000 prisoners remained detained from protest arrests.

=== July ===
- 2 July – Media reported that Myanmar security forces killed at least 25 people in a confrontation with opponents of the military junta in the central town of Tabayin.
- 7 July – Six PDF rebels from the Dawei Defense Team attempted to raid a school occupied by Pyusawhti militia in Yaungmaw Village, Dawei Township. Reinforcing Tatmadaw troops and police officers killed two rebels and repelled the attack after two hours.
- 19 to 30 July – Myanmar's healthcare system collapsed at the onset of a new wave of COVID-19 cases as oxygen supplies ran low. The junta restricted the private sale of oxygen tanks to prevent healthcare workers participating in civil disobedience from providing free care to other civilians. Protesting doctors were arrested by the junta after being lured out of hiding to treat "patients".

=== August ===
- 1 August – Min Aung Hlaing extended the state of emergency, saying it could last until August 2023 and named himself the new Prime Minister of Myanmar
- 3 August – The United States charged two Myanmar citizens over an alleged plot to hire hitmen and assassinate Kyaw Moe Tun, Myanmar's representative to the United Nations who defied the military coup earlier in 2021. The junta denied involvement.
- 5 August – Chin National Army (CNA) captured the final junta base in Thantlang, warning the remaining junta soldiers in the town to surrender.
- 11 August – Five people jumped from a four-story building in Botahtaung Township, Yangon to escape raiding junta soldiers. The raid came after suspicions about a series of blasts in downtown Yangon.
- 14 August – PDF members ambushed six Myanmar Police Force officers with pistols in a Yangon train. Four police officers died; The PDF seized 2 Type 56 rifles, a BA-94 submachine gun, and a G3 rifle.
- 16 August – Wa National Party chairman, Sai Pao Nup, resigned after pledging to cooperate with the military regime and welcoming the election announced by the junta.
- 20 August – 50 junta soldiers were reportedly killed in a series of landmine attacks by resistance fighters in Gangaw Township.
- 27 August – The Tatmadaw junta raided a Dawei PDF camp on the outskirts of Dawei City after a tip-off from an informant. Although the PDF did not suffer casualties, the Tatmadaw detained 20 villagers and destroyed an estimated 100,000,000 kyat of matériel.

=== September ===
- 7 September – The NUG declared a state emergency across the nation and launched a people's defensive war against the military junta.
- 10 September – At least 17 people have been killed during clashes between the military and resistance militia in Myin Thar village, Magway region.
- 14 September – The National Unity Government claimed that over 1700 junta soldiers had been killed and 630 wounded in fighting during the previous three months.
- 21 September – Over 40 junta soldiers were reported killed during firefights in Kayah State and the Sagaing Region on 19 September. At least 6 civilian fighters were also killed in the clashes.
- 22 September – It was reported that nearly 8,000 residents of Thantlang town, Chin state, fled to Mizoram, India after houses were set ablaze by the junta army.
- 27 September – Over 30 junta soldiers and at least 14 civilian resistance fighters were reported killed in clashes over the previous weekend in several townships in Sagaing Region and Chin and Kayah States.
- 28 September – At least 20 junta soldiers were reported killed in ambushes in Shan state. At least 4 resistance fighters died in the clashes, along with an unarmed 70-year-old civilian.

=== October ===
- 6 October – Over 40 junta soldiers were killed in ambushes in Gangaw Township, Magwe Region.
- 7 October – Junta controlled media reported at least 406 junta informants had been killed and 285 wounded since 1 February in targeted attacks by resistance forces.
  - The same day, Brigadier-General Phyo Thant, a senior commander of the North-western junta forces was reportedly detained after allegedly contacting resistance forces with the intention to defect, making him the highest-ranking official to have attempted to defect so far.
- 11 October – Around 90 junta soldiers were reported killed in clashes in the Sagaing and Magwe regions, and Kayah State in fighting over the previous weekend.

=== November ===
- 16 November – Junta forces overrun a Kalay PDF base in Kalay. They captured 9 Kalay PDF medics and killed 2 PDF fighters from the Kalay PDF Battalion 3.
- 17 November – Junta forces ambushed and captured an outpost of the Moebye PDF in southern Shan State's Pekhon Township. The PDF fighters guarding the outpost were asleep when a military unit from Light Infantry Battalion (LIB) 422, surrounded the fighters and began their ambush. The fighters had to retreat from the outpost.
- 23 November – A total of 30 junta soldiers in 10 military vehicles and a bulldozer ambushed and destroyed a base belonging to Monywa PDF's Squadron 205 near Palin village in Monywa, Sagaing Region, forcing resistance fighters to flee and retaking Palin. The base was a site where the PDF produced explosive devices. During the raid, junta troops set fire to two workshops where weapons had been stockpiled.
- 25 November –
  - Light Infantry Battalion 427 ambushed and killed 4 resistance fighters from KNDF at around 5:30 am near Hohpeik, Demoso Township. The fighters were part of a six-person scouting team.
  - KIA clashed with around 100 junta soldiers near Kachinthay, a village about 16 km east of the town of Shwegu, after an alleged bombardment of a Kachin village by the junta's recently acquired Su-30 fighter jets. The KIA refused to address rumours of them working with PDF forces or to provide casualty figures.
  - Matupi CDF teamed up with the Chin National Army to attack an outpost of Light Infantry Battalion 304 on the Matupi-Paletwa road. However, they only managed to kill 2 junta soldiers on guard duty before having to retreat.
- 26 November – Resistance fighters from the CDF attacked a government office where 10 soldiers were stationed near Matupi, killing 2.
- 28 November – The body of Ye Thu Naing, a PDF fighter previously captured on 19 November by junta forces, was found outside of a destroyed PDF base in the forested hills in southeastern Madaya Township. Ye Thu Naing was allegedly forced to lead soldiers to the PDF base that the junta soldiers then torched.

=== December ===
- 1 December –
  - About 50 soldiers from Tatmadaw's Infantry Battalion 42 attacked KIA territory near Nyaung Htauk village in Mohnyin Township from 8 am to 6 pm. The KIA did not disclose casualties.
  - Another clash occurred near Wailon village, on the Hpakant-Mohnyin road. The junta fired around 30 artillery shells at the site of the clash between 3 pm and 8 pm to support the advance of their infantry unit.
- 7 December – Salingyi G-Z Local PDF fighters detonated explosives in an attack against a military convoy, which triggered an assault on the village of Done Taw in Salingyi Township, Sagaing. 10 fighters and one civilian were captured and burned by junta soldiers; locals found the bodies shortly after.
- 8 December – A 90-minute clash broke out between the CDF and Tatmadaw forces in the military-occupied town of Thantlang. Three CDF fighters reportedly died during the clash. Well over a quarter of Thantlang's buildings were destroyed in this and 11 other incidents, making it difficult for CDF rebels to hide.
- 9 December – Myaing PDF in Magway Region attacked two military vehicles with three handmade explosives in an early morning ambush. Later at noon, the PDF attacked soldiers who were leaving Mintharkya village on foot, sparking a shootout. The PDF claims to have injured at least three soldiers in total.
- 12 December –
  - Four junta soldiers were allegedly killed after four days of fighting between KNDF and Karenni Army (KA) soldiers and the military's Light Infantry Battalion 428.
  - The Tatmadaw forces killed 4 PDF-appointed community guards and 3 PDF fighters in the village of Guang Kwe, Sagaing, during two days of fighting, forcing the PDF to retreat.
  - Tatmadaw troops raided two resistance hideouts in Maha Aung Myay and Pyigyitagon townships after a confession by a suspect involved in an attack against Tatmadaw troops. Fighting occurred at the Maha Aung Myay base and 7 PDF members were killed and a junta soldier suffered injuries. In Pyigyitagon, 1 PDF fighter was killed while throwing a homemade bomb at junta forces and running away.
- 13 December –
  - Tatmadaw troops attacked PDF fighters and another group called Zayar 7 in Ke Bar village, Ayadaw Township, with artillery bombardment, forcing the resistance fighters to retreat.
  - Tatmadaw soldiers captured 12 suspected resistance fighters after several bombs accidentally exploded in Yangon's Hlaingthaya Township. Two additional fighters who escaped were also captured later on by plain clothed Tatmadaw troops.
  - Tatmadaw forces surrounded a Depayin Township PDF base. Their leader told Myanmar NOW, "Things are really bad here. They're not even stopping anymore. They keep sending column after column to the region. Right after a column has passed the village, another column will come".
- 14 December – Around 200 Tatmadaw soldiers conducted a search in the KNLA Brigade 6-controlled town of Lay Kay Kaw Myothit near the Thai border and arrested several people believed to be linked to anti-junta movements including NLD lawmaker Wai Lin Aung. KNU Brigade 6 spokesperson did not comment on if the group had authorised the raid.
- 17 December –
  - 20 resistance fighters from the Yaw Defence Force were killed by a surprise Tatmadaw air assault on the village of Hnan Khar, Gangaw Township, whilst they were holding a meeting. Three helicopters were involved in the air assault on the village. Military-backed Pyusawhti militia then occupied the village.
  - Phyo Maung Maung Oo, a PDF resistance fighter, is shot dead and three others captured during a raid in Yangon Region's Thanlyin Township.
- 20 December – Tatmadaw forces left the village of Kunnar, Loikaw Township, after capturing it from KNDF late last week. According to a KNDF soldier, there were around 130 troops stationed there over the weekend and there had been no new clashes since last week's fighting.
- 22 December – At least nine people, including two children, were killed after an air raid by the Myanmar Air Force in Gangaw Township. As many as five helicopters fired on the village of about 6,000 people.
- 24 December – More than 35 people were massacred when junta troops ambushed their travel convoy near Mo So village of Hpruso Township, Kayah State. The United Nations is 'horrified' and calls for a 'thorough and transparent investigation' into the incident.

== 2022 ==
=== January ===
- 7 January – Intense fighting broke out in Loikaw, the Kayah State capital, between KNDF and junta troops as resistance groups attempted to take the city after one month of blocking junta road access to the entire state.
- 10 January – Myanmar military began bombing Loikaw from the air, forcing thousands of locals to flee the city and seek shelter in churches. Junta helicopters regained control of roads to other parts of Kayah State.
- 13 January – Maung Maung Kyaw was removed as the head of the Myanmar Air Force after international attention and sanctions from a series of aerial bombings. He remained on the State Administration Council.
- 17 January – The junta launched an airstrike on a IDP camp in Kayah State sheltering civilians fleeing intensified conflict in southeastern Myanmar.
- 31 January – At least three dozen junta soldiers were reportedly killed in ambushes over three days in Magwe, Sagaing and Tanintharyi regions and Chin, Shan and Kayah states.

=== February ===
- 1 February – At least 30 junta soldiers and Pyusawhti militias members area were killed by joint PDF attacks in Kani Township, Sagaing Region. Flotillas transporting supplies and soldiers by the junta were ambushed, with at least one flotilla set on fire during the attacks.
- 2 February –
  - 2 people were killed and 38 injured in a grenade attack following a pro-junta rally. No group has claimed responsibility.
  - According to Senior General Min Aung Hlaing, 367 junta-appointed officials have been assassinated in targeted attacks since 2021's 1 February coup.
- 4 February – Junta troops carried out a sneak attack on an Arakan Army (AA) outpost near Maungdaw in Rakhine State, killing an AA sentry.
- 6 February – A three-hour clash between the AA and the Junta started a breakdown of the informal ceasefire between the AA and the military in place since November 2020.
- 7 February – 38 junta soldiers were killed in surprise attacks by local PDFs in the Sagaing Region. The attacks included the use of drones. The Kachin Independence Army also claimed that around 200 junta soldiers, including a battalion commander, had been killed in three days of clashes in the Hpakant Township, Kachin State.
- 8 February – The AA and junta forces clashed on at least two occasions in Maungdaw in Rakhine State. Two civilians were also reported killed in further clashes in northern Maungdaw on the night of 7 February.
  - 35 junta soldiers were killed in attacks by local PDFs in the Sagaing and Bago regions. Resistance forces also began targeting the homes of junta pilots in Yangon in response to airstrikes on civilians.
- 10 February – Around 50 Myanmar junta personnel were killed during raids and ambushes by PDFs in three townships in Sagaing Region on 9 February.
- 11 February – Several junta troops, including a Major, were killed in an attack by the AA in Maungdaw, Rakhine State, on 8 February. 38 junta soldiers and 5 resistance fighters were also reported killed in clashes in Sagaing Region and Kayah State on 10 and 11 February.
- 12 February – 40 junta troops had been killed in attacks by PDF forces over two days. The clashes occurred in the Naypyitaw, Magwe, Sagaing, Mandalay and Yangon regions.
- 17 February – At least 12 resistance fighters were killed in clashes in the Khin-U Township, Sagaing Region. Military casualties from those clashes were not reported.
- 18 February – Around 20 junta soldiers and 20 resistance fighters were killed in clashes in Mobye town, southern Shan State.

=== March ===
- March – The junta carried out repeated air bombing and looting of villages in Shan and Kayah State, attacks on civilians, in what Amnesty International described as collective punishment.
- 7 March – Around 85 junta soldiers were reportedly killed during two clashes with local PDFs and Karenni forces in Demoso Township, Kayah State, during the previous weekend, with at least two junta soldiers captured.
- 21 March –
  - Brigade 6 of the Karen National Liberation Army (KNLA) stormed and occupied a Tatmadaw camp in the village of Maw Khi in Wallay Myaing subtownship, Myawaddy District, Kayin State in the evening. The Maw Khi camp is located about 50 miles south of Myawaddy, about three miles from the Burmese-Thai border.
  - 8 junta soldiers were reported killed in mine attacks by local resistance forces in the Magwe region.
- 28 March – Min Aung Hlaing vowed to "annihilate" opposition forces.
- 30 March – Around 20 junta soldiers were reported killed in ambushes targeting junta convoys in Mindat township, Chin state.

=== April ===
- 14 April – Fighting broke out in parts of Loikaw City. Recent combat in Kayin state resulted in a marked increase in refugees on the Thai border.
- 15 April – Junta soldiers suffered at least 30 casualties after being pushed back by the KNLA at the battle for Lay Kay Kaw.
- 19 April – 30 junta soldiers were killed in two ambushes by local resistance forces in Pale Township, Sagaing Region.
- 21 April –
  - 2 junta officers and 24 men working for the military council's electricity department were arrested by KNDF forces in southern Shan State's Pekhon Township.
  - A local defence force based in Tanintharyi Region's Kawthaung District claimed that they managed to kill three Myanmar army soldiers, confiscate weapons and occupy a police station in the area.
- 27 April – Chinland Defense Force fighters from Matupi reportedly ambushed a 70 vehicle Tatmadaw column between Matupi and Kyauktaw, resulting in the deaths of 8 junta soldiers.

=== May ===
- 17 May – National Unity Government Defence Minister Yee Mon asked for international help to arm resistance groups similar to the support given to Ukraine.
- 31 May – A bombing killed one person and injured nine others near the Sule Pagoda in Yangon, Myanmar. State media accused the People's Defence Force (PDF) of responsibility, which the PDF denied.

=== June ===
- 12 June – Almost 90 junta troops were reportedly killed in fierce fighting in Chin State, Kachin State and northern Sagaing Region. Shootouts lasting several hours took place between military battalion 415 and combined Kachin State PDF and KIA forces near Shwegu Township and Mohnyin Township, Kachin State. Chin Defense Force (CDF) claimed to have killed 16 regime soldiers in Kanpetlet Township, Chin State.
- 16 June – 18 junta troops werekilled by PDF ambush attacks in Yesagyo Township, Magway Region and Budalin Township, Sagaing Region. The attacks were claimed to be responses to the junta's arson attacks on 14 June.
- 23 June – 50 civilians were detained as hostages after a nighttime raid by the junta in Khin-U Township.

=== July ===
- 6 July – The Karen National Union stated that roughly 2,200 junta soldiers and militiamen had been killed since January 2022. Around 40 junta soldiers and 11 PDF fighters were also reported killed in clashes in Pekon township, Shan state.
- 23 July – The State Administration Council announced that it had executed four political prisoners, including Zayar Thaw and Kyaw Min Yu, marking the first time the death penalty had been carried out in Myanmar since the late 1980s. The event was widely seen as provocative escalation by the Burmese military in the ongoing conflict. The international community, including United Nations Secretary-General, the G7 nations, Canada, France, Germany, Italy, Japan, the United Kingdom, and the United States of America, and the European Union strongly condemned the executions.

=== August ===
- 11 August – At least 80 regime forces, including three battalion commanders and captains, were killed in firefights with PDF and EAOs across the country.
- 12 August – The Shanni Nationalities Army (SNA) and the Myanmar Army set fire to hundreds of homes in Hpakant Township, Kachin State, forcing the KIA to withdraw from the area.
- 15 August – The military junta court sentences former state counsellor Aung San Suu Kyi to six years in prison for corruption.
- 16 August – Two mortar shells fired from Myanmar Army lands in a Rohingya refugee camp in Bangladesh, killing one man and injuring five others. Myanmar Army helicopters allegedly entered Bangladeshi air space to attack Arakan Army and reportedly fired a shell within Bangladeshi air space. Two days later, Bangladesh summons Myanmar ambassador Aung Kyaw Moe to protest violation of land and airspace strongly.

=== September ===
- 2 September –
  - Aung San Suu Kyi was sentenced to three years in prison after being found guilty of election fraud. She will now serve an overall sentence of 20 years in prison for different charges.
  - Two SNA bases were attacked by the KIA and allied People's Defence Force groups using heavy artillery in Banmauk Township and Homalin Township.
- 16 September – The Burmese military killed 11 children and wounded another 17, during an airborne strike at a school in Letyetkone village, Sagaing Region (see Let Yet Kone massacre). The military claimed that the village had been harboring resistance fighters from the Kachin Independence Army and the People's Defense Force. The attack was widely condemned by the international community, including the United Nations and European Union.
- 23 September – retired Brigadier General Ohn Thwin, mentor to State Administration Council vice-chairman Senior General Soe Win, is assassinated by anti-regime guerilla groups in Yangon. This assassination increases security on high-ranking junta personnel as the highest ranked Myanmar army member to have been killed so far.

=== October ===
- 8 October – Junta forces torched at least 20 villages in Sagaing and Magway regions in implementing its "four cuts" strategy of attacking civilian houses to weaken anti-regime movements. However, according to Sagaing-based resistance spokespeople, people who lose everything in these torchings joined the resistance.
- Mid-October – NUG releases a statement calling for the victory of the Spring Revolution by the end of 2023. This call to action is followed by increased fighting in urban areas and in Southeastern Myanmar with resistance forces.
- 17 October – Junta forces kidnapped and decapitated Saw Tun Moe, a high school teacher, and left his head impaled on a National Unity Government-administered school's spiked gate after burning and looting Taung Myint village in Magway Region.
- 21 October –
  - Bangladesh's Foreign Minister AK Abdul Momen made a statement that border bombings by Myanmar stopped after he met Chinese ambassador to Bangladesh Li Jiming.
  - KNLA-led troops began sieging Kawkareik in the Battle of Kawkareik. A series of morning attacks near the highway leading into the city and on government offices led to heavy fighting within the city.
- 22 October – In the evening, KNLA-led troops retreated from Kawkareik after what appeared to be the first seizure of a major city. Fighting in the area continued.
- 23 October – Over 80 people were killed by airstrikes in Hpakant Township, Northern Myanmar during a celebration for the 62nd founding anniversary of the Kachin Independence Organization. It became the single deadliest attack on civilians since the start of the renewed civil war. The junta denied there were civilian casualties while the United Nations condemned the attack.
- 27 October –
  - Karen National Liberation Army-led forces seized the junta base for Light Infantry Battalion 339 in Kya Inn Seikgyi Township, Karen State.
  - Airstrikes from the junta as part of continued fighting near Kawkareik struck and damaged a dam.

=== November ===
- 12 November – Joint KNLA and People's Defence Team (PDT) forces raid and seize three junta bases in Shwegyin Township over three days. the PDT (or PaKaPha) is a newly formed set of local township defence forces controlled directly by the NUG's Ministry of Defence.
- 13 November – One of the Myanmar Air Force's Mi-34 helicopter mistakenly fires on junta troops, killing 60 in friendly fire.
- 14 November – Junta fines local administrators who fled their village in Pauk Township, Magway Region after fearing forced recruitment into the military-backed Pyusawhti militia earlier in November. Pyusawhti militias also looted the homes of those that fled.
- 15 November – The junta shells villages in Rakhine State on the highway between Yangon and Sittwe after a junta truck was hit by an Arakan Army landmine. Thousands of villagers flee to nearby Ponnagyun Township or Sittwe.
- 16–22 November – Chin state resistance forces used drones in a week-long siege of an outpost in Falam Township, killing 74% of the junta forces stationed. The Chin National Defence Force was ultimately unable to take the outpost due to the Air Force's aerial bombardments.
- 19 November – Hundreds of homes and many civilians are killed in a series of raids on Sagaing resistance stronghold of Khin-U Township
- 21–25 November – The Myanmar Air Force bombs several KIA targets in Mohnyin Township, Banmauk Township and Katha Township along the Sagaing-Kachin border to disrupt supply lines. Analysts say the junta is increasingly relying on its air force due to low ground capacity.
- 22 November –
  - The junta burns down a police station they could no longer defend in Myaing Township.
  - PDF attacks a police building in Monyo Township, Bago Region using cluster bombs.
- 24 November – The junta burned Mone-Hla village in Khin-U Township, Sagaing Region, including the home of Cardinal Charles Maung Bo, the head of the Catholic Church in Myanmar.
- 26 November – 15 junta soldiers were killed during a Bago PDF raid on a police station in Yedashe Township, Bago Region.
- 27 November – Arakan Army and the junta enter a temporary ceasefire either as a first step towards a more permanent ceasefire or for humanitarian reasons.
- 30 November – Junta begins a major assault on a Kokang base held by the Myanmar National Democratic Alliance Army near Chin Shwe Haw.2

=== December ===
- 6 December – Karenni Nationalities Defence Force soldiers capture three junta officers and a soldier responsible for the Mo So massacre in 2021.
- 7 December – Myanmar army launches a ground offensive against the Ta'ang National Liberation Army (TNLA) in Namhsan Township starting the Battle of Namhsan.
- 13 December – Myanmar army utilises aerial bombs in clashes with the TNLA in the Battle of Namhsan.
- 16 December – The BURMA Act is passed in the US authorising sanctions on individuals involved in the 2021 Myanmar coup d'état, support to civil society and humanitarian assistance as well as a position within the State Department dedicated to democracy in Burma.
- 17 December – Junta retreats from the Battle of Namhsan after suffering 98 casualties and issues a statement claiming the attack was a misunderstanding and that they reached an agreement with the TNLA. The TNLA rejects the statement.
- 27 December – Junta soldiers hide in civilian trucks impersonating workers to ambush local defence forces in Shwebo Township.
- 29 December – Several high-ranking former government officials of Ayeyarwady Region are released from house arrest including former chief minister Hla Moe Aung
- 30 December – Aung San Suu Kyi is sentenced to 33 years in prison for corruption.

== 2023 ==
=== January ===
- 5 January – Clashes between PDF forces near Inle Lake and the Pa-O National Organisation (PNO) break out after the PNO attempted to force villages in the area to each provide a speedboat and a Pyusawhti militia recruit.
- 19 January – the military launches air strikes at Moe Tarr Lay, Katha Township, Sagaing Region during a neighbourhood donation ceremony, killing seven civilians.
- 31 January – The junta-run Ministry of Home Affairs issues a directive permitting citizens deemed "loyal to the state" to obtain firearm licences and permits. To be eligible, citizens must be at least 18 and demonstrate a need for "personal safety".

=== February ===
- 7 February – The National Defence and Security Council extends the country's state of emergency and the military junta's term by an additional six months.
- 23 February – Martial law is extended to 3 additional townships in Sagaing Region. The Myanmar Army's 99th Light Infantry Division (LID) launches a new offensive against villages in Sagaing Region to suppress the anti-military resistance.
- 26 February – After a fight with local resistance forces in the village of Kandaw, four village fighters, including two teenagers, are decapitated.

=== March ===
- 2 March – 99th LID troops execute 17 villagers during the Tar Taing massacre in Sagaing Region, including two men who are decapitated, and three women who are raped before they are killed.
- 11 March – Army troops execute at least 30 villagers during the Pinlaung massacre in Shan State, including 3 Buddhist monks
- 23 March – Combined Chin resistance consisting of CNA, CNDF, and CDFs conducted multiple ambushes on a regime convoy between Kalay, Falam and Hakha. The convoy consisted of at least 30 vehicles, including two armoured cars, and were carrying troops, equipment and food supplies. The resistance forces destroyed three vehicles, stopped the convoy and seized the two armoured vehicles. The NUG awarded the combined Chin forces four hundred million kyat for seizing the two armoured vehicles.
- 24 March – CNA and CDF-Mautpi ambush another junta convoy carrying 80 troops on the road between Matupi and Paletwa, leaving the convoy with only about 50 troops, a dozen among whom were injured.

=== April ===
- Early April – the Kawthoolei Army (KTLA) launches an offensive on the Karen State Border Guard Force (BGF)-held Shwe Kokko in retaliation for the imprisonment and killing of the group's spokesperson by the BGF. They reportedly capture 5 BGF bases.
- 5 April – During a clash between PDF near Than Bo village, Nawnghkio Township, a civilian house was destroyed by an artillery shell fired by junta forces. 11-month old Sai War War Tun and 14-year old Nang Ma Aye were killed and their parents were injured.
- 8 April – The KTLA's offensive begins to stall. After junta/BGF counterattacks, the KTLA had to retreat, receiving heavy losses. In response, the Karen National Union (KNU) stated they were not informed of the attack, nor did they approve it. Later, the KNU would state that they would not accept the KTLA in KNU-held territory.
- 10 April – CNDF attacks a junta base near Varr village on the Kalay-Falam Road in Falam Township, killing eleven regime soldiers, capturing fourteen, and seizing weapons and ammunition.
- 11 April – Myanmar Air Force bombs a gathering celebrating the opening of a People's Administration Office in Pazigyi, Kantbalu Township, Sagaing Region killing at least 120 civilians, including several children.
- 17 April – A combined PDF force led by Yinmabin District's PDF Battalion 1 seized a junta base on Tower Taing hill in Kani Township, killing 30 soldiers from the base and seizing around 16 weapons including automatic rifles and grenade launchers as well as ammunition, while only about 3 remaining junta soldiers from the base escaped.

=== May ===
- 14 May – Cyclone Mocha hits Myanmar; the SAC declared the majority of Rakhine State and four townships in Chin State as disaster areas staffed by military officers. Although the NUG and Arakan Army appealed to foreign donors to help, all aid is screened by the Junta.

=== June ===
- 1 June – NUG announces the formation of the PDF's first battalion in Yangon Region- Battalion 5101.
- 18 June – A combined force of PDF and KNLA take control of the No. 8 Union Highway, installing checkpoints and arresting junta personnel.
- 19 June – The Urban Owls guerilla group assassinates Ye Khaing, the operations director and head of security of Yangon International Airport and a former air force major was assassinated outside his house at Mingaladon Township, Yangon. Ye Khaing was accused of providing information to the junta, detaining anti-junta activists at Myanmar's primary international airport. Urban Owls also claimed that Ye Khaing was a confidante of Steven Law, the owner of Asia World Company, which operates the airport, and is a major supporter of the regime in connection with the second-in-command, Senior General Soe Win.
- 22 June – Ye Belu, an anti-junta resistance group, attacked a junta security checkpoint at Chaung Taung bridge, killing four soldiers and one official working for the junta's Ministry of Immigration and Population in Lamaing.
- 26 June – Ye Belu assassinated a Pyusawhti militia leader in Duya, Ye Township
- 27 June – All administration offices in three Ye Township places—Lamaing, Khawzar and Ye—close down.
- 28 June – Ye Belu ambushed an army convoy from the junta's No. 19 Military Operations Command, killing five soldiers and injuring others.

=== July ===
- 4 July – The Myanmar Army and LNDP militias launched attacks against the Kachin Independence Army.
- 5 July – At least 10 Myanmar Army soldiers were killed by Chin resistance during the Battle of Timit.

=== August ===
- 7 August – The KIA captured Tatmadaw and Shanni Nationalities Army bases on the outskirts of Hpakant Township.
- 10 August – Junta forces and a coalition of several rebel groups clash at Thandaung, near Nay Pyi Taw. The rebel forces aim to capture the 606th Light Infantry Division Headquarters.
- 26 August –
  - Junta forces attempt to take TNLA controlled areas in Kutkai Township leading to counterattacks, including in nearby Muse Township.
  - 3 junta soldiers are killed and six injured during an attack on two junta bases in Hpapun Township byt KNLA Brigade 5.
- 27 August –
  - 11 resistance groups, including PDF groups and the Civilian's Defense and Security Organization of Myaung, jointly conducted drone strikes in Sagaing Township in the early morning, killing 17 soldiers.
  - Dawei Defense Team attacks a junta unit of 80 troops in Launglon Township, Tanintharyi Region, using land mines in the shootout.
- 29 August – Tavoy People Liberation Force attacked and killed three junta soldiers at a military checkpoint in Yebyu Township, Tanintharyi Region.

=== September ===
- 3 September – Cobra Column, a resistance group active in Southern Myanmar, attacks the township administrative office in Myawaddy twice using drones. Five people, including a policeman and a high-ranking military official, were killed and 11 were severely wounded.
- 15 September – The Northern Thandaung Defense Force and the Lethal Prop drone unit attack the Aye Lar military base near the Nay Pyi Taw International Airport with 2 makeshift bombs. It was the first documented drone attack by resistance forces on an airbase.
- 22 September – The People's Defence Force clash with the SNA in Homalin Township, with conflicting reports of Tatmadaw presence.
  - The Tatmadaw Northeastern Command and Pyusawhti militias attacked a Ta'ang National Liberation Army base in Kutkai Township, Shan State with drones and aircraft. According to the TNLA, no casualties or damage occurred.
- 25 September – The KIA and PDF overrun a Sa Ya Pha intelligence office during a night raid in Hpakant Township.

=== October ===
- 9 October – The Myanmar military launched an artillery attack targeting Laiza, a town in northern Myanmar that serves as the capital of the Kachin Independence Army. The attack hit Monlaike, an IPD camp located two miles away from Laiza, killing at least 29 civilians, and multiple were injured, including 13 children.
- 27 October –
- Operation 1027 was launched by the Three Brotherhood Alliance, a military coalition composed of the Arakan Army (AA), Myanmar National Democratic Alliance Army (MNDAA), and Ta'ang National Liberation Army (TNLA). The alliance forces attacked the Myanmar Army's stations in towns in Shan State, Mandalay Region and expanded to towns in Sagaing Region and Kachin State. The attack resulted in 14 civilian deaths and forced thousands to be displaced. Simultaneously, the AA engages junta forces in Htigyaing Township, Sagaing Region.
- The KNLA and PDF combined forces launched an assault on Kawkareik, leading to severe clashes between the rebel forces and junta forces around the town.
- 30 October –
  - Operation 1027 – Nawnghkio fell under limited TNLA and Mandalay-PDF control
  - Operation 1027 – In Kunlong, 41 combatants, including three commanding officers surrendered to the MNDAA.

=== November ===
Operation 1027 as of February 2024

- 1 November –
  - Operation 1027 – The junta sends a convoy to reinforce Nawnghkio, resulting in clashes with rebel forces where an armored car was blown up.
  - Operation 1027 – Chinshwehaw, Pang Hseng and Hsenwi fall to rebel forces.
- 3 November – Operation 1027 – TNLA seizes a suspension bridge over the Shweli River near Namkham. Battle of Namkham starts
- 6 November –
  - Operation 1027 – The district-level capital town Kawlin falls to combined AA, KIA and PDF forces
  - Operation 1027 – Namkham falls under limited TNLA control.
- 7 November –
- Operation 1107 is launched by KNPLF, KA and KNDF seizing border posts in Mese Township, Kayah State (including Pantein).
- Operation 1027 – Khampat in Tamu Township, western Sagaing Region is taken by PDF forces.
- Operation 1027 – Brigadier General Aung Kyaw Lwin is killed in a battle in Kunlong Township where coalition forces attacked Panlong base.
- Operation 1027 – MNDAA took control of Monekoe and Kunlong town.
- Operation 1027 – A firefight between TNLA and SSPP/SSA-N soldiers, reportedly stemming from reasons unrelated to Operation 1027, resulted in 4 deaths.
- 8 November – Operation 1027- TNLA and MDY-PDF attack the junta's base near the Goteik viaduct, seizing the key Goktwin bridge on the main highway from Mandalay to China.
- 11 November –
  - Operation 1111 is launched by the KNDF, KA and other allied groups, to seize the Kayah State capital Loikaw.
  - Operation 1111 – A Myanmar Air Force fighter jet crashes in Kayah State. The KNDF claims responsibility but it remains unclear if the crash was due to a technical failure.
- 12 November –
  - Operation 1027 – TNLA captures the Kyinti military base and a bridge near Hsipaw
  - Operation 1027 – Light Infantry Battalion 129, comprising more than 200 soldiers and family members, surrenders to the MNDAA in Laukkaing Township, Shan State.
- 13 November –
  - Rakhine State – AA attacks two border guard stations in Rathedaung Township breaking the Rakhine State ceasefire agreement between the junta and AA.
  - Chin State – Chin National Army captures town of Rikhawdar on India-Myanmar border after two days of battle.
- 14 November –
  - Chin State – Arakan Army launches an offensive in Paletwa Township.
- 15 November –
  - Operation 1111 – The KNDF takes control of Loikaw University. 110+ junta soldiers were killed during the two-day battle.
- 16 November –
  - AA takes control of Pauktaw, Rakhine a town very close to the Rakhine state capital Sittwe. The Myanmar Navy fires back with air support, hitting civilian houses with machine gun fire.
  - Operation 1027 – Cybercrime ringleader Ming Xuechang and his family were arrested by Myanmar junta authorities and handed over to China. Ming Xuechang died in police custody.
- 18 November – The General Administration Department issued a local order to ban unauthorized drone flights and restrict the sale of drones and drone accessories in Yangon Region.
- 21 November – PDF-Zoland captures a junta base at Kennedy Peak in Tedim Township, Chin State.
- 23 November – A combined force of KNA(B) and PDFs captured a UNLF(PAMBEI) camp 2 miles east of Thanan village.
- 24 November – Civilians in Yangon close businesses early and students stop attending public high schools amidst nighttime armoured vehicle patrols and reports of forced conscription and robberies by military personnel. The military denies such report, although junta media sources claim civilians are being arrested for connections to the PDF.
- 25 November – Chin National Army captures town of Lailenpi in Matupi Township.
- 28 November –
  - Operation 1027 – Light Infantry Battalion 125, comprising 186 soldiers, surrenders to the MNDAA. MNDAA takes control of Konkyan Township.
  - Operation 1027 – The Brotherhood Alliance claims that they have captured roads leading into Muse, which carried 98% of all cross-border trade with China, amounting to $2.2 billion in the six months to October.
- 29 November –
  - CDF And CNA captures town of Rezua in Matupi Township.
  - Rival Shan ethnic armed organizations, the Restoration Council of Shan State and the Shan State Progressive Party, declare a ceasefire. The SSPP stated that the 2 armies "[intended] to unite as one in the future." They also stated they would release POWs captured during past hostilities.

=== December ===
- 1 December – Battle of Laukkai – MNDAA starts penetrating the Tong Chain neighbourhood in southeastern Laukkai city, focusing fire on military targets as hundreds of civilians still remained trapped in the city. Chinese embassy in Yangon urges all citizens to leave the city.
- 3 December – Battle of Luakkai – MNDAA attacks military outpost on Four Buddhist Statues Hill immediately south of Laukkai. The battle lasted eight hours as the junta had a substantial presence on the hilltop base.
- 4 December –
  - Operation 1107: KNLA and local PDF units capture the town of Mone in Kyaukkyi Township, marking the first capture of a settlement in Bago Region.
  - Battle of Luakkai – MNDAA attacked retreating junta soldiers who had abandoned positions in the north of the city.
- 5 December – Arakan Army (AA( captured Tarunaing military base in Paletwa Township.
- 6 December – Battle of Luakkai- MNDAA captured Four Buddhist Statues Hill, controlling all territory south of Laukkai and began focusing on the city's north side.
- 11 December – China held peace talks between the Tatmadaw and various rebel groups in the North, including the alliance, saying there were 'positive results'.
- 13 December – The Brotherhood Alliance announced that the peace talks in China "lasted only 10 minutes" and vowed to continue fighting.
- 15 December – Operation 1027 – TNLA captured town of Namhsan.
- 18 December – Battle of Laukkai resumed when the Myanmar Air Force carried out three airstrikes on MNDAA targets in Htin Par Keng, a village directly north of Laukkai's northern city gates.
- 19 December – Battle of Luakkai – MNDAA gains control of the Yanlonkyaing border gate, Border Point 122 on the Chinese border with Nansan, Yunnan, and Border Point 125, a smaller border crossing and site of an IDP camp with 30,000 people.
- 22 December – Operation 1027 – TNLA routs Light Infantry Battalion 130 and captures the town of Mantong. The Pa Laung Self-Administered Zone is now fully controlled by the TNLA.
- 25 December – Battle of Luakkai – Junta airstrikes and artillery in Tong Chain, Laukkai city killed 8 civilians and injured 24.
- 26 December – Battle of Luakkai – Tatmadaw's 55th Light Infantry Division and local Border Guard Forces (BGF) surrender to the MNDAA, totalling 90 people, including BGF commander Bai Suocheng. After the surrender, the MNDAA takes over the police compound and begin patrolling the city.
- 27 December – KNLA-led forces take control of Nat Than Kwin in the Bago Region.
- 28 December – "Most" of Laukkai came under MNDAA control, with junta forces largely abandoning the city.
- 29 December – A fierce firefight erupted between the Junta soldiers and rebels. As a result, 151 Junta soldiers crossed the border into Mizoram, India. They surrendered to Assam Rifles forces; an official report states that the soldiers will be repatriated to Myanmar as soon as possible.

== 2024 ==
=== January ===
- 4 January – Battle of Laukkai – Junta military personnel surrender their headquarters on 4 January and hand weapons and ammunition to MNDAA troops as they and their families evacuate the city. Up to 1000 regime troops, family and civil servants were evacuated to Lashio, which itself is surrounded by the Three Brotherhood Alliance.
- 5 January – The Battle of Laukkai ends, with the MNDAA gaining full control of Laukkai and the Kokang Self-Administered Zone. According to the MNDAA, 2389 junta personnel and about 1600 family members laid down their arms and surrendered. A junta spokesperson stated that they made the decision prioritizing the safety of their families. Surrendering personnel and families who had not already left the previous day are evacuated to Lashio.
- 7 January – Myanmar Air Force launched an air strike on the Kanan village in Tamu Township, killing least 17 civilians, including nine children, and injuring 20. The military government denied it, claiming that it was false news.
- 8 January – Arakan Army captured the Taung Shey Taung base in Kyauktaw Township, Rakhine State. 200 junta troops surrendered during this battle.
- 9 January – Arakan Army engaged in several heavy clashes in Paletwa Township, escalating attacks to target Paletwa, a strategic town in the Indo-Myanmar Kaladan Multi-Modal Transit Transport Project.
- 12 January –
  - China announced that it had brokered a ceasefire between the junta and the Three Brotherhood Alliance.
  - The junta announced a plan to conscript soldiers from rural villages in Bago Region as increased firefighting in Bago threatens the Yangon–Mandalay Expressway.
- 13 January – TNLA reported that the junta breaks their ceasefire agreement with airstrikes in various townships in Northern Shan, including Lashio Township and Kyaukme Township.
- 15 January – Arakan Army captured the town of Paletwa in Chin State following fighting since 13 November 2023.
- 18 January – Fierce firefighting ensued between Junta forces and Arakan Army with AA capturing a town on the Mizoram-Myanmar border. 276 Myanmar soldiers, along with their arms and ammunition, reached Bandukbanga village on the India-Myanmar-Bangladesh border tripoint and surrendered to the Indian army.
- 19 January – Combined forces of the KIA, ABSDF, and Kachin PDF capture the town of Mongmit.
- 20 January –
  - The Indian Government decided to fence the 1,643 km border with Myanmar; the decision was made after an influx of refugees and junta soldiers, with more than 600 surrendering to Indian forces.
  - The Tatmadaw and the Pa-O National Army (PNA) engages in a firefight with the Pa-O National Liberation Army (PNLA) at Hopong Township after the former attempted to confiscate weapons from the latter's convoy, injuring some soldiers and PNA fighters while PNLA casualty figures remain unknown.
  - KIA and allied forces captured the town of Mabein.
- 21 January – KIA captures the strategically significant Man Wein Gyi base, on the route from Ruili, China, to Namkham.
- 23 January – Deputy commander-in-chief Soe Win met with Karen BGF leader Colonel Saw Chit Thu in Hpa-an after the latter refused to come to the capital Naypyidaw and meet the junta.
- 24 January –
  - PNLA, local PDF forces, and the KNDF attack the PNO/Junta-controlled town of Hsi Hseng. The Tatmadaw responds with airstrikes and shelling.
  - In Ye, Mon State, the PDF ambushes a vehicle belonging to the Junta-aligned Mon Peace Defense Force (MPDF). Three MPDF members were killed and two Type 56 AKs and an M79 grenade launcher are captured.
  - KIA captures the village of Nam Hpat Kar after a month of fighting.
- 25 January –
  - Arakan Army seizes the control of a port town, Pauktaw after heavy clashes with junta forces. Most of the town's buildings are heavily damaged.
  - The junta recaptures Mongmit from KIA control. the KIA intensifies attacks in Hpakant Township.
- 26 January – PNLA takes control of Hsi Hseng, Shan State.
- 29 January –
  - KNLA and PDF forces shot down a Tatmadaw Eurocopter AS365 with machine guns, sniper rifles, and RPGs as it was landing. Brigadier General Aye Min Naung of the 44th Light Infantry Division and the pilot were among the five recorded casualties.
  - Arakan Army has reportedly seized the Junta's Light Infantry Battalion 380 headquarters in Minbya Township, Rakhine State.
- 30 January – On 30 January, PNLA forces are forced to temporarily withdraw from Hsi Hseng, recapturing the town shortly after.
- 31 January – A joint force led by Karen National Defence Organisation conducts a drone strike that killed two military commanders: Captain Zaw Win Naing of 32nd Infantry Division and Captain Wai Lin Soe of 585th Light Infantry Division in Htee Ka Pa Lel village, south of Myawaddy town.

=== February ===
- 1 February – Arakan Army has reportedly captured the Light Infantry Battalion (LIB) 540 in Mrauk-U Township after heavy fighting.
- 2 February – KIA and PDF forces capture the Namtein outpost, threatening the road connecting Hpakant to the regional capital, Myitkyina.
- 5 February –
  - Myanmar Air Force bombs a school in Dawsiei village, Demoso Township, killing at least four children and injuring ten.
  - A Bangladeshi woman and a Rohingya man died from a mortar shell that fell on the Ghumdum border in Bandarban, reportedly fired by Myanmar.
- 6 February – Combined forces of the KIA and PDF have seized two junta military outposts in Hpakant and Mansi townships in Kachin State.
- 7 February –
  - Arakan Army took control of Rakhine State's Minbya Township after capturing the last two military battalion headquarters in the township.
  - The Arakan Army additionally captured the town of Kyauktaw, while heavy fighting continued in Mrauk U and Ramree.
- 9 February – The Tatmadaw and police abandons their posts in Myebon to report to Kyaukphyu on 9 February, leaving ammunition behind in their rush and abandoning the southern township of Mrauk-U District.
- 10 February –
  - Myanmar's junta announced a law requiring all men aged 18–35 and women aged 18–27 to serve at least two years under military command from 10 February onwards.
  - Mrauk U was captured by the Arakan Army, with three Myanmar Navy landing craft reportedly being sunk.
- 11 February – In response to the seizure of the three towns, the junta blows up the Kisapanadi bridge, which spans the Kaladan River in Kyauktaw Township at 8 p.m. Earlier that day, they also destroyed the Min Chaung bridge at the entrance to the state capital, Sittwe.
- 13 February – Anti-junta groups conceded that regime forces recaptured the town of Kawlin from the NUG.
- 14 February –
  - A splinter group of the New Mon State Party's armed wing, Mon National Liberation Army, named Mon National Liberation Army (Anti-Military Dictatorship), announced that they will no longer negotiate with the junta and will join hands with the revolutionary forces, effectively declaring war on the junta. The splinter group's leadership, made up of senior MNLA officials, stated that they would only be active in areas the MNLA was not and intended to unite with local resistance forces.
  - Combined forces of the Karenni Army and Karenni Nationalities Defense Force captured the town of Shadaw after almost a month-long battle, leading Shadaw Township to be the second Kayah township completely captured by Karenni forces.
- 15 February – The Arakan Army captured Myebon after junta forces abandoned it 6 days earlier.
- 18 and 19 February – 100 Rohingya men from four villages in Buthidaung Township are conscripted by the junta despite the draft only applying to citizens. The men undergo 14 days of basic training while the junta promises them ID cards, a bag of rice, and a monthly salary of US$41. Many Rohingya who successfully dodge the draft strive to join Arakan Army over ARSA or the RSO. Simultaneously, junta officials threatened to revoke the citizenship of Kamein IDPs in Kyaukphyu if men between the ages of 18 and 55 did not form militias.
- 20 February –
  - KIA forces capture the Jehkam/Si Kham Gyi military base after 4 days of attacks.
  - The Shan State Progressive Party (SSPP) announced that it and its armed forces will join forces with the anti-junta resistance forces.
- 22 February –
  - Junta forces launched an offensive to recapture the town of Maw Luu, which had been captured by the KIA and ABSDF in December 2023.
  - Clashes broke out east of Hopong after junta/PNA forces attacked PNLA forces. After several hours, junta forces were forced to retreat.
- 23 February –
  - SSPP and allied troops captured a military base between Hopong and Mong Pan.
  - Clashes were reported at the Htam Sam cave between PNLA and the Junta, along the Taunggyi-Loilem road.
  - KNLA/PDF ambush a junta convoy in Tanintharyi, killing 18 junta soldiers and capturing five vehicles, the deadliest attack on junta forces in Tanintharyi since 2021.
- 26 February – AA intensifies clashes on Ramree killing 80 junta soldiers over three days.
- 27 February –
  - The majority of homes in Kawlin are razed by junta forces.
  - Local PDF and KNLA forces claim to have captured most of Myitta, Tanintharyi Region, 30 miles east of the region's capital Dawei.
- 28 February – AA captures the final junta outpost in Minbya Township, taking full control of the township.
- 29 February – An Indian delegation led by Parliament member K. Vanlalvena meets with members of the Arakan Army in Paletwa to discuss the continuation of the building of the Kaladan Road Project, alongside inspecting a section of the road.

=== March ===
- 2 March – The NMSP-AMD detained 3 leaders of local pro-junta "People's Militia Forces" in Karmarwet and Kawt Pi Htaw, Mudon Township, additionally seizing several weapons.
- 3 March – Junta soldiers based in Hsaik Hkawng and Bang Yin launched an offensive into the town of Hsi Hseng.
- 4 March – After 3 days of attacks, the KIA captured three hilltop bases in Mansi Township from the Tatmadaw.
- 4–5 March – In response to NMSP-AMD activity, the junta expanded their presence in Mudon and Kamarwet Townships, stationing 160 soldiers throughout both townships.
- 5 March –
  - The Tatmadaw claimed to have imposed martial law on three townships that were under the administrative and military control of the TNLA: Mantong Township, Namhsan Township, and Namtu Township. The announcement was interpreted by analysts as an attempt to "save face by declaring martial law in towns over which they have lost control".
  - The Arakan Army (AA) captured the town of Ponnagyun and its surrounding township. During the battle, Myanmar Navy warships and fighter jets shell the town, destroying the Zay Ti Pyin bridge connecting Ponnagyun to Rathedaung.
  - Karenni forces captured the Hpasawng Bridge to which the junta responded by launching an attack on a monastery in the town, killing five and wounding 20 internally displaced people (IDP).
- 7 March –
  - Operation 0307 – the KIA simultaneously launched attacks on over ten junta outposts in eastern Kachin. Fighting primarily took place along the highway between Bhamo and the Kachin State capital, Myitkyina, as well as around Laiza.
  - U Shwe Min, a pro-junta militia leader of the Lisu National Development Party, was killed during a KIA raid on a camp near Aung Myay Thit village.
- 8 March –
  - The AA issued a statement stating that they will cooperate with local Chin leaders to create a civilian government in Paletwa, with the AA acting as peacekeepers.
  - KIA captured a junta camp north of Sumprabum.
  - The PNLA accused the junta of using chemical bombs to attack Hsi Hseng in violation of international agreements.
- 9 March – The KNLA captured the town of Thingannyinaung, on the Myawaddy-Kawkareik highway.
- 11 March – The KIA announced it has captured 20 junta bases and outposts in Kachin State since launching an operation there the previous week.
- 12 March –
  - The AA captured Ramree town in Rakhine State from the junta.
  - The AA claimed to have captured the Aung Thapyay border outpost in Maungdaw Township, forcing 179 junta soldiers to flee into neighboring Bangladesh.
- 13 March – The Hpu Lu Gyi camp, south of Myawaddy, after a "five minute fight". This camp held both strategic and moral significance as it acted as a staging point for attacks on Manerplaw and Kawmoora after the junta captured it in 1990.
- 14 March –
  - MNDAAA reopened 2 border crossings, Chin Shwe Haw and Kyu Koke, on the border with China for trade.
  - Karenni forces captured the rest of Hpasawng and most of Hpasawng Township.
  - Junta forces begin an offensive on the villages of Sakkan and Kampani to resist anti-junta attacks on Kale, capturing Kampani. Resistance forces responded by issuing a "final warning" to junta forces in the town, prompting civilians to begin evacuating.
  - KIA began attacking the Infantry Battalion 46 junta garrison post within Sumprabum. The junta responds with aerial strikes.
  - KIA captured the Dawthponeyan sub-township.
- 15 March – The KIA seized the headquarters of the Infantry Battalion 237 in Bhamo District.
- 17 March – The AA captured the town of Rathedaung, cutting off Sittwe from northern Rakhine State.
- 19 March –
  - 21 administrators in Rakhine's Thandwe announced their resignation in response to the military recruitment.
  - The first reported clash in KNLA 7th Brigade controlled territory since the coup occurred near Methawaw after junta soldiers invaded the area under the pretext of repairing a road. Junta forces were forced to retreat.
- 22 March –
  - The KIA claimed to have captured over 50 military outposts and 13 strategically significant junta bases around the Myitkyina-Bhamo Road, including: all outposts surrounding Laiza, battalion headquarters in 5 townships, and camps near the KIA's old headquarters of Pajau.
  - The Mon State Revolution Force (MSRF), in cooperation with several other Mon State-based resistance groups, begin vehicle inspections along the road stretching from the Malwe Mountain to Kaleinaung, prompting junta forces to close the road.
- Before 23 March – Sometime before the 23rd, a Rohingya man was shot in Sittwe, with the Arakan Army being blamed. It was later found that the shooting was committed by one of the pro-junta factions of the Arakan Liberation Army, working as a proxy of the junta in an attempt to stir ethnic tensions between the Arakanese and the Rohingya.
- 24 March – The Arakan Army starts an offensive on Ann Township, launching attacks on Ann, the headquarters of the junta's Western Command. Concurrently, the Arakan Army launched attacks on neighboring Ngape Township in Magway Region. Ann's location is strategically important as the link between Rakhine and Magway Region via the Minbu-Ann road through the Arakan Mountains and as a gateway preventing AA from attacking southern Rakhine State.
- 25 March – The MNLA-AMD, alongside several allies such as the Mon National Army, captured the Kawt Bein Police Station in Kawkareik Township. In response, junta forces shelled Kawt Bein and surrounding settlements.
- 26 and 27 March – The MNDAA and the Shan State Army (SSPP) clashed in the Namsalat and Seiau Village Tracts, Hseni Township, after the MNDAA reportedly began launching drone bombs and attacks on SSPP camps.
- 26 March – The MNDAA and the Tatmadaw clashed shortly for the first time since the Chinese-brokered ceasefire. Junta forces attempted to invade MNDAA-controlled territory from Kone Nyaung, south-east of Lashio but were repelled. In response, the Chinese ambassador to Myanmar met with the junta foreign minister on 28 March to discuss ending the clashes.
- 27 March –
  - Arakan Army forces seized the camp near Ge Laung and Lone Kauk villages of Ann Township.
  - Kawt Bein
- 28 March – Mon resistance captures Dhamma Tha village near Kawt Bein.
  - Papun is captured by the KNLA after a siege that began on 20 March.
  - KIA seized two junta bases in Yaw Yone and Nga Gayan near Lweje on the Chinese border in Momauk Township.
  - Natogyi PDF and two other resistance groups attacked a junta base in the east of Natogyi town and killed and injured several regime soldiers the next day.
- 29 March – Natogyi PDF and two other resistance groups attacked regime forces stationed at the police station and construction department office in Natogyi.
- 31 March – The KNLA and the Ba Htoo Army ambushed junta reinforcements in Dawei Township, Tanintharyi Region, killing and injuring up to 40 soldiers.

=== April ===
- 1 April – The KIA completed the capture of the entirety of the Bhamo-Lweje road.
- 4 April – The People's Defense Force launched an unprecedented drone attack against Aye Lar airbase, the main Tatmadaw headquarters, and Min Aung Hlaing's residence in the capital, Naypyitaw. Almost 30 drones were deployed; junta forces claimed 7 were shot down.
- 5 April – The junta garrison in Myawaddy surrendered to the KNLA, allowing anti-junta forces to take the border town.
- 7 April – During the capture of Myawaddy, certain junta officials fled into Thailand. The junta requested Thailand for a military flight from Mae Sot to evacuate said officials and others awaiting refuge on the border.
- 8 April – PDF forces launched drone attacks on the Southeastern Command headquarters in Mawlamyine while Soe Win, deputy commander-in-chief of the junta, was in the building.
- 9 April –
  - KNLA troops take control of the Thai–Myanmar Friendship Bridge border crossing in northeastern Myawaddy in the morning. Then, they launch heavy assaults on the LIB 275th base. In response, the Karen National Army (Formerly the Karen State Border Guard Force) states that they had taken positions in the town to prevent clashes.
  - The Second People's Assembly of the National Unity Consultative Council pledged to revoke the 1982 Myanmar nationality law, a law which has been historically used to discriminate and attack ethnic minority groups throughout the country.
- 10 April –
  - Around 10pm, the KNLA captures the LIB 275th base in the town and over 200 junta soldiers cross the border into Mae Sot. In response, Thailand deployed the 3rd Army along the border. After the capture of the town, the junta began sending reinforcements in a counteroffensive to retake the town, which promptly stalled in Kyondoe.
  - The Karenni National Solidarity Organisation (KNSO), a "people's militia force" under the junta, declares war on the junta and joined resistance groups after an over 20-year ceasefire.
- 14 April –
  - A bomb exploded during a Thingyan festival in Mandalay, injuring 12 people. No group claimed responsibility, although some PDF groups and Burmese artists warned people not to celebrate at SAC-sponsored festivals.
  - Simultaneously, the PDF launched 107mm rockets at the Defence Services Academy to assassinate Min Aung Hlaing. However, he survived, and some of the shells missed their target and hit the Pyin Oo Lwin People's Hospital's orthopedic wing.
- 15 April – Arakha Army clashed with the Arakan Rohingya Salvation Army in Buthidaung, resulting in 25 Rohingya deaths and 3,000 fleeing.
- 19 April – Two LGBT siblings were arrested in Kyaukphyu by the Myanmar Police Force. One, a vegetable seller, was accused of providing food to Arakha Army while the other was arrested on unknown charges.
- 22 April – Intense clashes break out around the Tha Htay hydropower plant in northern Thandwe Township, reportedly leading to the deaths of "dozens" of junta soldiers.
- 23 April – The BURMA Act goes through its first implementation with $121 million earmarked for Fiscal Year 2024. $75 million is reserved for refugee assistance programs, $25 million for nonlethal assistance and technical support for the NUG and EAOs, and the rest towards documentation of atrocities, civil society programs, and assistance towards groups such as the Rohingya, political prisoners, and Tatmadaw deserters.
- 24 April – The town of Myawaddy was recaptured by junta forces after KNLA troops were forced to withdraw following a heavy firefight.
- 25 April – After a day long battle involving around 300 junta troops, junta forces recapture the town of Kawt Bein and Dhamma Tha from Mon resistance
- 26 April – The Junta forces recaptured Kawkareik Township village on the border of Mon and Karen states from Karen and Mon rebels. Also the Kawbein village and Dhamma Tha village was also recaptured from rebels after heavy gunfight with arrival of reinforcements and heavy artillery bombardment.
- 27 April – It was reported that the Karen National Liberation Army captured a military base and supply station in Karen State's Papun Township.

=== May ===
- 2 May –
  - The junta suspended all permits for work by men outside the country and banned men of conscription age from leaving.
  - The Chin Brotherhood Alliance, with aid from other Chin groups and the Arakan Army, capture the strategic town of Kyindwe, Kanpetlet Township during the conclusion of the four-month long Battle of Kyindwe.
- 3 May – The vice-chairperson of the Shan State Progress Party announced that it and its armed forces, the Shan State Army (SSPP), would join revolutionary forces before retracting his statement two days later.
- 4 May – Karenni forces launched an offensive on the last remaining junta forces in Hpasawng Township, killing 20 junta soldiers.
- 7 May – Thaksin Shinawatra, the former PM of Thailand, met leaders of the NUG and EAOs, attempting to mediate a resolution of the conflict.
- 9 May – The Myanmar Air Force bombed a monastery in Akyi Pan Pa Lun, Saw Township, Magway Region killing at least 15 and injuring 30.
- 11 May – Junta troops executed 32 villagers during the Lethtoketaw massacre in Lethtoketaw, Sagaing Region.
- 16 May – The Zoland Defense Force and other CBA members launched an offensive to capture Tonzang from the junta and its allied Zomi Revolutionary Army.
- 18 May – The town of Buthidaung was captured by the Arakan Army.
- 20 May –
  - The towns of Cikha and Tonzang, in northern Chin State, were captured by Chin resistance forces.
  - The Mon State Defense Force and the Mon State Revolutionary Force began militarily cooperating.
- 21 May – The Zoland Defense Force and aligned CBA members completed the capture of Tonzang and chased junta troops from the area.
- 27 May –
  - The CBA launched an offensive on Tedim.
  - After a month of warnings, the Ta'ang National Liberation Army (TNLA) began blockading several villages in Namhkam Township which SSPP/SSA soldiers were stationed in, eventually confiscating SSPP/SSA weapons and detaining Shan soldiers, transporting them to neighboring Mu Se Township. Due to this, the SSPP/SSA reportedly withdrew from camps in Hsenwi, Kutkai, and Pang Hseng.
- 28 May – The CBA captured a junta base near Tedim.
- 30 May – CDF-Matupi captured the district administrative office on the Matupi-Hakha road in Matupi Township.
- 31 May – The Daai Local Council announced that local defense forces in Kanpetlet, Matupi, Mindat, and Paletwa Townships had agreed to form the Chinland Defence Force – Daai. The council also stated that the 4 townships would be united into 1 administrative area under its governance, and that a constitution for the Daai Chin would be written.

=== June ===
- 2 June – Clashes erupted on the Thandwe-Taungup highway near Ngapali Beach, Thandwe. The AA captured the village of Gawt.
- 7 June –
  - Junta soldiers killed more than 60 villagers accused of collaborating with AA in Singaung village, Rakhine State.
  - Over the last month, the KNLA, aided by PDF's, the Bamar People's Liberation Army (BPLA), and the Force for Federal Democracy, completed the capture of remaining junta bases in Hpapun Township. By 7 June, only 3 junta bases remain uncaptured in the township, encircled by KNLA forces and allies.
- 8 June – The Tatmadaw launches an offensive to recapture National Highway 8, the only paved road linking the Tanintharyi Region in southern Myanmar to the rest of the country.
- 9 June –
  - The Junta Na Na Kha 2 battalion visited a Rohingya village in Maungdaw where the commander convinced youths to stay in the village and provide supplies when asked. However, the youths refused the order to burn down ethnic Rakhine houses and fled.
  - Chin resistance groups announced the launch of "Operation Chin Brotherhood", aimed at coordinating their efforts to drive junta's troops out of the state. They subsequently launched an attack on the town of Matupi.
- 10 June – The Chinland Council issued a statement asking the Arakan Army to refrain from military and administrative operations in Chinland. This came days after Global Khumi Organisation urged the Arakha Army against committing human rights violations against the Khumi Chin people of Paletwa Township.
- 11 June –
  - The Kachin Independence Army captured the town of Sadon, resulting in the loss of junta control for all border trade routes in Kachin State.
  - An army base less than 1 mile away from Northwestern Command HQ (Monywa) was captured by a coalition of People's Defence Force called Union Liberation Front.
- 13 June – Chin resistance announced the capture of Matupi's police station and administrative offices, leading junta forces to retreat to bases north and south of the town.
- 14 June – Junta forces began to amass forces in towns surrounding 3BA-held territory, fortifying positions in Mongyai, Muse, Kyaukme, Hsipaw, Pyin Oo Lwin, and Lashio with "tens of thousands" of soldiers, leading military sources to warn residents to take cautionary safety measures.
- 15 June – The Arakan Army (AA) launched an offensive to capture Taungup, with AA forces launching attacks on the junta base near Taungup University.
- 16 June – Junta forces from Tedim launched an offensive to recapture positions along the Tedim-Kalay road.
- 17 June –
  - Heavy clashes break out outside of Kyaukphyu as junta forces leave Danyawaddy naval base, near Thaing Chaung village, leading to 10 junta deaths.
  - Operation Chin Brotherhood continues with CBA forces and allies capturing the 304th Light Infantry Battalion base outside of Matupi, 1 of 2 remaining bases surrounding Matupi.
  - CBA forces detain a Chin National Army soldier driving close to the frontline, and plan to release him the following day.
- 18 June –
  - Junta forces recaptured Kennedy Peak from the Zomi Federal Union. After the outpost's capture, junta forces began launching raids on surrounding villages.
  - The Chin National Army and allies launched a surprise attack on the CBA near Matupi, leading to 2 CBA deaths.
- 20 June –
  - AA forces ambushed a junta column along the Taungup-Pandaung road, leading to 60 junta deaths.
  - Junta forces recaptured the strategically important Tainngen village.
- 23 June – The Arakan Army captured Thandwe Airport.
- 24 June –
  - The Arakan Army captured Taw Hein Taung base in Ann Township.
  - During clashes between the two Chin rival groups around Matupi, the CNA/Chinland Council was forced to retreat from the Matupi area.
  - Chinland Defense Forces clashed with junta forces outside of the Chin State capital Hakha. The junta retaliated by setting fires to homes in the town.
  - Tatmadaw officials met with battalion commanders for the SSPP and United Wa State Army (UWSA), unsuccessfully attempting to bribe them to end arms sales to other ethnic armies.
- 26 June –
  - After announcing the day before that it would resume military operations against the junta following repeated ceasefire violations, the TNLA seized the town of Nawnghkio in northern Shan State.
  - The AA began attacking on Ngapali beach and the remaining two junta bases in Thandwe.
- 27 June –
  - Junta forces loss control of recent gains in northern Chin State after Chinland Council-led counteroffensives recaptured both Kennedy Peak and Tainngen. Junta forces retreat to Khaing Kham.
  - TNLA forces burn down Kyatpyin Police Station while attempting to capture Kyatpyin to encircle junta forces in neighboring Mogok. It was also reported that the TNLA had entered eastern areas of Mogok.
- 28 June – The TNLA captured most of Kyaukme and continued attacking the junta bases around the town.
- 29 June – The CBA captured the 140th Infantry Battalion base north of Matupi and consequently seized the entire town.

=== July ===
- 3 July – the TNLA seizes the town of Kyaukme.
- 7 July –
  - The Arakan Army confirms the capture of Thandwe Airport, claiming that 400 junta soldiers had died in the battle.
  - The CNA detains 2 Yaw Defense Force (YDF) soldiers in Gangaw Township for "temporary questioning", taking the detainees to Camp Victoria 80 miles (130 km) away.
  - MNDAA forces clash with junta forces in Hoya village, Mongyai Township.
- 8 July –
  - YDF closes the Hakha-Gangaw road. The detained soldiers were released on 12 July.
  - TNLA accuses the SSPP of launching attacks on its soldiers and aiding junta troops in withdrawing from bases, condemning the Shan group for "disrupting" the alliance offensive.
- 9 July – AA captures Ngapali beach.
- 10 July –
  - The TNLA attacked junta positions near Tangyan.
  - The MDY-PDF and TNLA capture the last junta bases near Nawnghkio and capture the town completely.
- 11 July – Following an agreement with junta forces, the UWSA takes control of the town of Tangyan in northern Shan State by deploying thousands of soldiers. Some UWSA soldiers are reportedly sent to Lashio as well.
- 12 July – The Daai Regional Council and its armed forces, the CDF-Daai, resign from the Chinland Council to prioritise the "consolidation" of the Daai people.
- 13 July – The Shan State Army (SSPP) takes control of the town of Mongyai, in a move apparently aimed at preventing fighting in northern Shan State from spreading southwards.
- 14 July – MNDAA institutes a tenuous 4-day ceasefire after meeting with the Chinese Communist Party. Despite the ceasefire, clashes continued. TNLA and SSPP leaders also met in Panghsang, Wa State, to discuss an end to clashes.
- 16 July – TNLA forces capture most of Mongmit and began launching attacks on the junta headquarters south of the town.
- 17 July –
  - The PDF launch a rocket attack on Naypyidaw Airport. No casualties were reported.
  - MDY-PDF captured Singu and its surrounding township, further cutting off junta forces in Northern Shan State.
- 20 July –
  - As part of "Operation Rung", the CDF-Hakha capture the Hakha Main Police Station and release 62 detainees.
  - The 3BA, reportedly under pressure from China, agreed to extend the ceasefire to 31 July. On the same day, despite the ceasefire, junta reinforcements launched renewed attacks on Kyaukme.
- 22 July – CNA and allies launched an offensive to take remaining junta bases in Thantlang, quickly capturing several bases on the Thantlang-Hakha road.
- 25 July – TNLA and MDY-PDF enters and capture Mogok.
- 27 July –
  - The CNA and Zomi Revolutionary Army meet in Aizawl for peace negotiations.
  - UWSA forces enter Lashio with the permission of both the MNDAA and junta to protect their external relations offices.
- 30 July – MNDAA forces ambush junta reinforcements attempting to reach Lashio, inflicting heavy casualties.
- 31 July –
  - KNDF and allies seize Junta positions around the tourist hotspot of Inle Lake.
  - TNLA forces take complete control over Mongmit after capturing the last junta in the town.

=== August ===
- 2 August – A Eurocopter AS365 Dauphin of the Myanmar Air Force crashed in Hmawbi Township, Yangon Region, killing two out of four occupants. Myanmar Air Force Major General Soe Tin Latt was one the victims of this accident.
- 3 August – The Myanmar National Democratic Alliance Army captures Northeastern regional command headquarters in Lashio, Shan State.
- 6 August – The TNLA takes the last junta base in Kyaukme was captured, completing the TNLA's capture of the town.
- 8 August – Hundreds of residents flee Pyin Oo Lwin out of fear of a potential offensive by anti-junta forces.
- 9 August – The 3 Brotherhood Alliance calls on Northeastern Command chief Brigadier-General Soe Hlaing to surrender himself and Muse, from which he directs Northeastern Command operations. Muse remained safe for him due to the proximity with the Chinese border.
- 10 August –
  - According to the National Unity Government, the Myanmar military junta controls less than 30% of all towns.
  - TNLA forces launches an offensive against Hsipaw, capturing the town's prison.
- 11 August – MDY-PDF launches an offensive against Tagaung, the first historical capital of the Burmese monarchy, capturing the town the next day.
- 12 August – Mandalay PDF seizes a Junta base in Zayat Kwin village, Thabeikkyin Township, Mandalay region, according to The Irrawaddy.
- 13 August –
  - Chinland Defense Force and Chin National Army seized a Junta base in Hakha Township, seizing weapons and killing 10 Junta personnel.
  - TNLA captures Nawngkawgyi village, south of Hsipaw.
- 14 August – AA capture Kyeintali.
- 15 August – The KNLA, PDF, and 3BA are allegedly planning an offensive towards Mandalay by the end of 2024.
- 17 August – MDY-PDF launched an offensive on Thabeikkyin.
- 18 August – Reports of a series of drone attacks targeting Rohingya villagers fleeing the river killing 200+ people was reported. Both the Junta and Arakan Army have traded blame for the attacks.
- 22 August – Resistance groups seize Junta air defence unit in Tada-U
- 25 August – MDY-PDF captures the town of Thabeikkyin and its township, bringing the entire Thabeikkyin District under rebel control.
- 29 August – The Ruili City Security Commission demanded the TNLA to "End all military activities harmful to Chinese border stability and to the lives and properties of Chinese citizens. Otherwise, China will take more deterrent and disciplinary measures."

=== September ===
- 3 September – The People's Liberation Army announces that it had captured 138 elephants in offensives around Mandalay, and promised to protect them from poaching and black market trade.
- 4 September – The Karenni Nationalities Defense Force attempted to assassinate Min Aung Hlaing while he visited Loikaw with artillery strikes.
- 8 and 9 September – According to the Arakan Army, Myanmar Air Force bombs struck a clinic, a United Nations building, and two detention centers in Pauktaw and Maungdaw Townships. Dozens of people were killed and/or injured (including ARSA and RSO POWs).
- 10 September – 29 conscripts, including 27 people who attempted to migrate to Thailand, kill two junta soldiers. Armed with their weapons, the majority of them fled to KNU territory while the remaining two were reported missing. 22 of them entered KNLA ranks.
- 12 September – The KIA seized a police station in Seeing Taung, a village on the outskirts of Hpakant.
- 13 September – 18 KNDF medics drowned in Typhoon Yagi floods while attending a training course.
- 18 September – The MNDAA declared that they would not form alliances with the NUG or "foreign communities opposing China and Myanmar." They further declared the ceasing of all military action against the SAC junta, except in cases of self-defense.
- 20 September – Tatmadaw forces purportedly backed by Lahu militias attacked an RCSS base in Mongping.
- 26 September – The SAC junta attempted to jumpstart negotiations between the EAOs and the PDFs to lay down their arms in exchange for participating in elections.
- 29 September – The KIA capture the town of Chipwi.

=== October ===
- 1 October – The Myanmar Air Force bombs MNDAA-controlled Lashio, resulting in 83 casualties.
- 3 October – Indonesia announced that officials from ASEAN, the European Union, the United Nations, and NUG would meet in a regional summit in Jakarta at a later date. The SAC junta is not expected to attend.
- 8 October – Resistance groups capture Pinlebu on the border of Sagaing Region and Kachin State. Over 50 anti-regime groups took part in the joint operation. Nearly 800 junta troops were defeated. The Pinlebu military operation began on 15 August and after more than 50 days of fighting, the town was captured.
- 9 October – Northern Shan State- the Ta’ang National Liberation Army attempted to capture the last Myanmar junta base in Hsipaw Township in order to deter a junta counteroffensive in nearby Nawnghkio Township.
- 10 October – Junta troops torch village Budalin, Sagaing Region. Around 200 junta troops set fire to Kyauk Oh Myauk village in Budalin Township, Sagaing Region on Wednesday, according to residents and other local sources. The raids follow a resistance attack on junta troops near Budalin town on 30 September in which 35 regime soldiers were reportedly killed and 43 others taken prisoner.
- 14 October – The Arakan Army detained and repatriated 16 Bangladeshi fishermen who were attacked by pirates.
- 15 October –
  - The Ta'ang National Liberation Army said it had released 191 family members of junta soldiers detained during its offensive against Light Infantry Battalion 503 and 504 in Hsipaw Township in northern Shan State. The TNLA defeated the last junta battalion, Infantry Battalion 23, in Hsipaw Township on Sunday.
  - The Kachin Independence Army has captured the junta's Border Guard Force Battalion (former New Democratic Army – Kachin) headquarters near the town of Pang War. The headquarters is located near the border of China, with Pangwa holding strategic importance due to its role as a rare earth mineral hub.
- 16 October – TNLA declared total victory in northern Shan State's Hsipaw after seizing Infantry Battalion 23, the last of three junta strongholds in the township, after nearly three months of fighting. The armed group said it has also captured the township's police station and department offices. It seized around 160 pieces of ordnance during the fighting.
  - The Anti-Fascist Internationalist Front, a group of left-wing internationalists, officially formed to primarily train anti-junta forces in Chin State.
- 17 October – The military regime and the Myanmar National Democratic Alliance Army (MNDAA) clashed for around 30 minutes in a village just 4.8 km from the trade town Muse on the Chinese border in northern Shan State on Tuesday, according to residents. One house was destroyed by a shell during the fighting. The MNDAA has halted its offensive in northern Shan State since seizing the capital, Lashio, in early August. The SSPP, KIA, TNLA, MNDAA, junta troops and junta-allied militias are present in Muse Township, according to residents.
- 21 October – The Kachin Independence Army captured junta-aligned Border Guard Force (former New Democratic Army – Kachin) Battalion 1003 near Kanpiketi, a trade town near the Chinese border in northern Myanmar's Kachin State. Battalion 1001 is the only battalion that still remains in NDA-K's hands.
- 25 October –
  - The Arakan Army encircles the town of Ann, Rakhine State, the headquarters of the Tatmadaw Western Command.
  - The Chin National Defense Force clashed with junta forces near Falam in a raid called "Mission Jerusalem".
- 27 October – On the anniversary of Operation 1027, the Bamar People's Liberation Army announced their relocation to the Anyar region.
- 28 October – 80 Tatmadaw POWs held by the MNDAA escaped a prison in Lashio. Only 5 were captured while the rest remain fugitives.
- 29 October – Many smaller Karenni groups unite to form the Kayan National Army (KNA).
- 31 October – KIA and PDF forces capture the last BGF Battalion 1001 (NDA-K) HQ near Phimaw, Myitkyina District. Junta troops then fled to the Chinese border town of Ganfai.

=== November ===
- 1 November – TNLA and other anti-regime groups encircle Junta troops attempting to regain control of an intersection linking Northern Shan State with Mandalay Region on the Mandalay–Lashio highway in northern Shan State.
- 2 November – The Kachin Independence Army and its allies seize Phimaw town on the Chinese border in Chipwi Township, while China is calling for peace along the Kachin State frontier.
- 5 November – The Tatmadaw shot down three drones in Lewe Township as Min Aung Hlaing begins flying to China at Naypyidaw International Airport. An as of yet unknown resistance group was allegedly attempting to assassinate him.
- 7 November – A PDF group called "Joker Guerrilla Army" and other PDF forces ambushed junta police troops in Myaing, Magway Region, releasing footage of the attack the next day. Two police officers, including a deputy superintendent, were killed in the ambush.
- 9 November – The KNLA captured the Tatmadaw's Kuseik base and cut off supplies to Papun.
- 13 November – PDF forces in the Mandalay Region released footage of an attack against a junta police station in Taungtha. Casualties caused by the attack are currently unconfirmed.
- 14 November – The home of actor Yan Aung, suffers minor damage from an explosive device. An anti-junta cell, Dark Shadow, claims responsibility for the strike; they further "warned" entertainers not to cooperate with the SAC regime.
- 19 November – Tensions increase between the United Wa State Army and Thailand increase over the former allegedly encroaching on Thai border territory.
- 20 November – The KIA captured Kanpiketi on the Chinese border. Junta troops, employees, and their family members reportedly fled into China.
- 22 November – At least 12 regime soldiers are killed in Madaya Township, Mandalay Region on Sunday when their 70-strong group came under attack from several People's Defense Force groups at South Chone Pauk Village. The PDF groups seized nine firearms along with ammunition and other military equipment.
- 24 November – The Arakan Army took control of Taungup town in southern Rakhine State after a 17-day battle. Some bases outside the city remained under the junta's control.
- 25 November – During the night between 25 and 26 November, over 30 junta troops were killed in clashes with Karenni Army in a rural area of Loikaw, Karenni (Kayah) State. According to KA Adjutant-General Colonel Phone Naing and other resistance sources, the junta soldiers were part of an 80-men unit from the 66th Light Infantry Division and were trying to reach Loikaw.

=== December ===
- 4 December – The Kachin Independence Army and its allies reportedly attacked Myanmar junta targets in Bhamo and Mansi townships, Kachin State, seizing outposts from Infantry Battalion 47 troops near the entrance to Bhamo town on the Mansi road.
- 8 December –
  - The Arakan Army (AA) captured the junta's last remaining border stronghold, Border Guard Police Battalion No. 5, located outside Maungdaw town. After several months of fighting, AA finally seized Maungdaw Township, taking complete control of Myanmar's 270-kilometer-long border with Bangladesh.
  - The Chinland Council seized the last regime outpost on the strategic Timit Plain between the Chin State capital of Hakha and Thantlang following a two-week offensive.
  - Two Mon National Liberation Army Members were injured by Tatmadaw shelling.
- 21 December – The Chin Brotherhood Alliance captured Kanpetlet.
- 29 December – The Arakan Army captured the town of Gwa.

== 2025 ==
=== January ===
- 1 January – The Arakan Army (AA) attacked a Tatmadaw base in the Arakan mountains on the outskirts of Taung Pone Gyi near Padaung Township, Bago Region.
- 2 January - A drone attack targeted a Hindu temple in Phyu Township, Bago Region. 7 civilians died, and 4 suffered injuries. The NUG and the Myanmar Hindu Union accuse the Tatmadaw of perpetrating the bombing.
- 5 January – The Arakan Army, alongside Ayeyarwady PDF forces, clashed with junta soldiers in Thabaung Township, Ayeyarwady Region with the apparent goal to seize a Chinese paper mill.
- 6 January – Thein Wai, an official of a local anti-junta People's Administration Team in Tin Ngoke Gyi Village, Kanbalu Township, Sagaing Region, was assassinated by gunmen wearing military-style uniforms.
- 8 January – Myanmar Army launched an airstrike to Kyauk Ni Maw village on Ramree island, killing at least 40 people and injuring 20; many of them were ethnic Rohingya people.
- 10 January – AA and allied forces captured the village of Magyizin in Shwethaungyan Subtownship, Ayeyarwady Region.
- 20 January – The Myanmar Nationalities Democratic Alliance Army (MNDAA) agreed to withdraw from Lashio by June as part of a Chinese-brokered ceasefire agreement with the SAC junta.
- 24 January – An Arakan Army spokesperson confirmed the authenticity of videos showing AA soldiers torturing and executing two POWs. The next day, the spokesperson said the AA did not condone unlawful killing and would work to prevent it from happening again.
- 26 January – The Kachin Independence Army and People's Defence Force (PDF) captured Bhamo Airport and the Tatmadaw Armored Battalion 7006 base.
- 28 January – PDF units resumed assaults on SAC positions in Indaw, Sagaing Region.

=== February ===
- 3 February – Rebel forces led by the Karen National Liberation Army (KNLA) allegedly captured the Mae Pale base from the SAC in Mon State’s Belin Township.
- 4 February –
  - The KIA allegedly captured an SAC position in Bhamo, Kachin State.
  - In Pekon Township, Shan State, the Karenni Nationalities Defence Force (KNDF) launched an attack on junta troops advancing on Moe Bye town. In response, the junta used Harbin Y-12 in airstrikes on the area.
- 6 February – The KNDF raided a junta base in Loikaw, Kayah State. Several soldiers were killed and captured.
- 7 February – The KNDF allegedly ambushed SAC forces trying to retake Mobye, Pekon Township, Shan State, on the Karenni State border. The SAC allegedly responded with airstrikes.
- 8 February – PDF conducts an ambush on a Military Council Boat in Salin Township, Magway Region.
- 9 February – The Tatmadaw began looting and torching over 100 houses in Ohn Taw village, Salin Township over the span of nine days.
- 10 February – The Irrawaddy reported alleged speculation in regards to an incoming battle between SAC and Arakan Army forces for Sittwe Township in Rakhine State due to continuously exchanged artillery fire.
- 18 February –
  - Two regime police officers are killed in a resistance ambush while riding motorcycles near Alotawpyae Pagoda at the UNESCO World Heritage Site of Bagan in Nyaung-U Township, Mandalay Region. A third policeman escapes the attack. Resistance forces seize two weapons and ammunition from the dead officers.
  - PDF attacks junta soldiers in Tanintharyi Region during an urban fighting.
- 19 February – The Chinland Council and the Interim Chin National Consultative Council met in Mizoram, India, and agreed to form a united front against the SAC junta.
- 20 February – A video emerges showing the PDF ambushing a convoy carrying Myanmar policemen in Salingyi Township, Sagaing Region.
- 27 February – The KNLA and allied forces captured a frontline junta outpost in Karen State's Hlinebwe Township near the Thai border. More than 500 locals fled into Thailand during the fighting as the regime brought in warplanes to defend the outpost.

=== March ===
- 1 March – The Irrawaddy reported on alleged fighting between SAC and AA forces for the Danyawaddy naval base in Kyaukphyu Township, Rakhine State.
- 9 March – Natogyi People's Defense Force killed nearly 50 regime troops and detained 14 others in Natogyi Township, Mandalay Region. Three resistance fighters were killed and seven others injured in the fighting.
- 11 March – The Tatmadaw retook Taung Hkam in Nawnghkio Township, Shan State after an intense battle with TNLA and PDF forces.
- 17 March – The Arakan Army and its allies attacked a junta base in Nyaungyo, Bago Region; the base is crucial for the defence of the regime's arms factories.
- 18 March – A junta's operation to advance in rural areas of Katha Township ends in failure after Katha PDF repels it, killing 40 and capturing 29 regime soldiers. In the fierce fighting, 2 resistance soldiers died too.
- 26 March – AA enters Lemyethna Township and clashes with the junta in villages near the Pathein-Monywa Highway, capturing several villages, including Tonetaw, Le Khon Gyi, Le Khon Lay, Wut Kone, and San Kone.
- 28 March –
  - The 7.7 Magnitude 2025 Myanmar earthquake strikes causing massive damage and loss of life, especially around Mandalay.
  - The junta continued its bombing campaigns in Rakhine State, destroying parts of the hospital in Arakan Army-controlled Ponnagyun.
- 29 March –
  - The following day, the junta resumed aerial bombardment on areas near the KNU headquarters as well as targets in northern Shan, Bago, and Sagaing regions.
  - The NUG announces a two-week unilateral pause in offensive actions to coordinate humanitarian efforts with the UN and non-governmental groups and provide access to resistance held areas.
- 30 March –
  - Junta forces bombed Pauk Township in Sagaing Region using helicopters despite the NUG's unilateral ceasefire declaration.
  - The AA continued offensive operations in Kyaukphyu Township, sieging a junta outpost near the town.
- 31 March – Anti-junta forces, including the Bamar Army, attacked the Tanyaung Substation in Salin Township, Magway Region. 32 SAC soldiers and officers were killed, and 80 transformers were damaged. The Bamar Army claimed that they did not conduct operations in earthquake-affected areas.

=== April ===
- Early April: MNDAA takes control of Hsenwi administration.
- 1 April –
  - The Three Brotherhood Alliance announced a 1-month partial ceasefire, pausing offensives.
  - Junta leader Min Aung Hlaing announced on Myawaddy TV that he would continue military operations against the PDF and anti-junta EAOs; he claimed that they were preparing for future attacks.
- 2 April –
  - The Junta fires warning shots at a Chinese Red Cross aid convoy.
  - Min Aung Hlaing announces that he would be implementing a 20-day ceasefire until 22 April.
  - KIA announces a ceasefire, reserving the right to defend themselves.
  - Arakan Army fully captured the strategic Nyaung Kyoke hill base located along the Taungoo–Pantanaw road near the border of Bago Region.
- 3 April –
  - The junta conducts an aerial bombing campaign in Indaw, Sagaing Region and continued firing artillery in Bhamo, Kachin State.
  - The Zomi Revolutionary Army (ZRA) burned down around 80 homes in Nakzang village, Chin State, during an attack against the Chinland Council in Tonzang Township.
- 4 April –
  - The MNDAA and SAC junta agree under Chinese negotiations to jointly administer Lashio District. The former will withdraw from the city by 20 April while still controlling much of the outskirts.
  - The AA killed a member of the Arakan Rohingya Salvation Army and seized two guns along with some ammunition during an operation in Maungdaw Township near the Bangladesh border. ARSA militants entered Myanmar from Bangladesh.
- 7 April –
  - Falam, Chin State fell under the control of the Chin Brotherhood Alliance after they captured the last remaining military base, LIB 268. Numerous groups, including the Anti-Fascist Internationalist Front, participated in the battle.
  - A combined force of the Kachin Independence Army, People's Defense Force, and ABSDF captured Indaw, Sagaing Region. Aung Thet Oo, commander of the 77th LID during the Bago massacre, was among those captured.
- 10 April – A vehicle carrying Major Thaw Zin Oo from the Military Council's weapon factory No. 24 was attacked in Pakokku, Magway Region, killing the major and another passenger (Ko Myint Oo the owner of White House KTV), by member of Earthquake People's Defense Force.
- 11 April – Intense clashes occurred between Arakan Army and Junta soldiers in a valley situated between Pri Sae Kay and Nan Fet Taung village in Kyaukphyu Township.
- 14 April – A joint force of the Karen National Liberation Army (KNLA) and the PDF launched a coordinated offensive against junta's headquarters and bases in Kyondoe Town (Light Infantry Battalions 545 and 546) and Kawkareik (MOC-12), Kawkareik Township, Karen State.
- 17 April – The Chinland Defense Force – Kalay Kabaw Gangaw (CDF-KKG) (part of CNA) announced that it had successfully seized control of four military council bases situated between Kale and Gangaw over the course of two months, as part of the CDF-KKG Major Operation that began in February 2025.
- 18 April – A convoy of vehicles with the Chinese flag identifying themselves as the "Ceasefire Monitoring Group" drove into Lashio from China.
- 19 April – The KNLA capture Hteehta Base in Thanintharyi Region.
- 20 April – The Danu People's Liberation Army accused the junta of using chemical weapons during its offensive in the area of Tawngkham Village Nawnghkio Township in southern Shan State.
- 21 April – The MNDAA lowers their flags in Lashio and retreats to checkpoints five miles north and three miles south, continuing to surround the city and control portions of Lashio's outer wards.
- 22 April – Southern Shan-based rebel forces, including the Southern Shan State Local Revolution Force (SSLRU), Shan South Local Defense Force, and the Southern Defense Force (SODF), have united under the name Shan South National Defense Force (SSNDF) and officially joined Tactical Operations Command (TOC)-9 of the Karenni Nationalities Defense Force (KNDF).
- 24 April – Intense clashes broke out between the Kachin Independence Army and Myanmar junta forces advancing toward Hpakant Township in Kachin State from the directions of Kamaing and Indawgyi. The two military columns moving towards Hpakant are believed to be part of the junta's "Yan Naing Min" operation.
- 26 April – Dawei National Liberation Army (DNLA) stormed the junta's Hali Gui camp near Maung Mae Shaung village in Dawei Township, Tanintharyi Region, resulting in the suicide of an army captain and the surrender of 16 personnel.
- 28 April – A clash near Liphkhamaw village in Kyaukphyu Township resulted in the Arakan Army seizing over 10 junta soldiers bodies and several weapons.
- 29 April – A junta Mi-35 helicopter carrying out airstrikes on villages in the southern part of Kalay Township, Sagaing Region was hit by the Chin National Army and forced to make an emergency landing.

=== May ===
- 1 May
  - The Three Brotherhood Alliance extends its unilateral ceasefire from 1 to 31 May, following the first phase in April to support recovery efforts for the 2025 Myanmar earthquake.
  - The junta continues daily bombings of Madaya Township and begins pushing to raid into eastern Madaya Township.
- 8 May – Combined forces of People's Defence Force and the Karen National Liberation Army jointly overrun the headquarters of Light Infantry Battalion 598 at Nyaung Chay Htauk Village in Shwegyin Township, Bago Region.
- 9 May –
  - The Karen National Union and the Federal Force for Democracy seize the junta's Htee Khee base on the Thai border in Dawei Township, Tanintharyi Region. It was the last junta base in Hteekhee, a border trade hub and a strategic link in the trade route between Dawei and Thailand.
  - Regime forces capture at least eight outposts of the Ta’ang National Liberation Army during their offensive in northern Shan State's Nawnghkio Township near Thayet Cho village that had started the previous day.
- 11 May – Arakan Army ambush and strike an advancing military column in proximity to the villages of Laek Khamaw and Malakyun, Kyaukphyu Township, Rakhine State.
- 12 May – The junta airstrikes a village school in Depayin, killing around 50, mostly children, despite the declared ceasefire.
- 13 May – Urban guerrilla groups Freeland Attack Force and Anonymous Fighters Force carry out a grenade attack on police barracks on the Maha Myaing Police Station in Sanchaung Township, Yangon. On the same day, a junta unit stationed near a sports hall on Pyidaungsu Road in Ward 29, North Dagon Township, Yangon, was targeted with a remote-controlled mine by North Okkalapa PDF. Two junta personnel stationed at a guardhouse were injured.
- 14 May – 10 members of the Tamu PaKaFa (PDO) were killed by the Assam Rifles near Chandel District, Manipur, India. The bodies were returned after negotiations with the Indian government.
- 15 May –
  - The KNLA captured the junta's Mae La camp (also known as Maw Kwee Lu) near the Myanmar–Thailand border.
  - Karen forces seized a junta military base in Hlaingbwe Township after 39 years of the junta's occupation, where they killed nine soldiers, including a major.
  - A Myanmar Navy vessel carrying reinforcements and military equipment docked at Kyaukphyu's No. 1 port. The weapons and personnel were distributed to both LIB 543 and Police Battalion 32 near Kyaukphyu, which are engaged in heavy clashes with AA fighters.
- 16 May – Junta's troops retreat from off-take station of a Chinese pipeline east of Natogyi town, Mandalay Region after an attack started the previous day by Natogyi People's Defense Force.
- 19 May –
  - The Arakan Army captured two junta military camps in Kyaukphyu, including a security outpost in Mintat Taung and a camp at a government school.
  - PDF seized Thein Kone Tower Camp in Paungde Township, Pyay District of the Bago Region.
- 20 May –
  - KIA reportedly shot down a junta helicopter with an FPV drone, killing the pilot in Shwegu Township.
  - The Karen National Liberation Army seized the Maw Phoe Kay base near the Myanmar-Thailand border in Karen State.
- 22 May – Cho Tun Aung, Myanmar's former ambassador to Cambodia, was assassinated in Mayangon Township, Yangon, by the Golden Valley Warriors. He served as a lecturer in the National Defence College on counterterrorism and international relations.
- 26 May – Brigadier General Kyaw Myo Aung was killed by an Arakan Army sniper near Kyaukphyu. Additionally the AA also seized more than 30 other junta bodies and some weapons.
- 27 May –
  - Around 20 Chinese soldiers were reportedly operating drones to help Myanmar's junta attack villages during Kyaukphyu clashes as Arakan Army's recent gains near Chinese-backed investments.
  - A junta convoy was ambushed by the Karen National Liberation Army and allied groups in DKBA territory near Sone Si Maung, Myawaddy Township while attempting to reinforce the Thay Baw Boe base. Soldiers were reportedly moving from the Myanmar–Thailand border; out of 72 soldiers, 30 POWs were taken and at least several died.
- 29 May – An Arakan Army drone strike killed six junta troops, including a commander, near the Kyaukphyu Special Economic Zone.
- 30 May – Multiple junta troops, including Lieutenant Colonel Kyaw Lin Kyaing, were captured near Mindat Taung village, Kyaukphyu Township.

=== June ===
- 1 June – The MNDAA and the Shan State Army- North began clashing in Lashio Township. The SSPP claims that eight MNDAA fighters died during an attempted ambush.
- 3 June – The KNLA and PDF finished taking over the Thay Baw Boe base.
- 5 June – The Arakan Army seized the MPT Tower Plateau outpost in Ngape Township, Magway Region.
  - The KNLA seize the Bawdi military outpost on the Thailand-Myanmar border in Dawei Township, Tanintharyi Region.
- 13 June – The Asho-CDF captured 23 soldiers attempting to flee the Nat Ye Kan hilltop base along the Ann-Padan road in Ngape Township near the border between Magway Region and Rakhine State.
- 15 June –
  - The Tatmadaw's 344th Artillery Battalion retreated from Yegyi Township to Kyonpyaw due to attacks from the Arakan Army.
  - AA begins their attack on the Tatmadaw's 34th Infantry Battalion base located near Kyaukpyu Airport.
- 17 June – The MNDAA and SSPP hold talks to end clashes.
- 19 June – The Communist Party of Burma PLA and ABSDF capture the police station in Kantdaung, Pale Township, Sagaing Region.
- 23 June – The TNLA and SSA-N clash in Mongmit Township.
- 30 June – The Tatmadaw recaptured the town of Mobye from joint KNDF-PDF forces.

=== July ===
- 2 July – Fighting broke out between the Chin National Defence Force (CNDF) and the Hualngoram Chinland Defence Force (CDF) in Falam Township, Hualngoram accused the CNDF of entering their territory while the CNDF claimed the other had opened fire on them. Both the Chinland Council and the Chin Brotherhood have expressed desire for de-escalation, though the Brotherhood also warned against external intervention.
- 3 July –
  - A Myanmar Air Force FTC-2000 was found crashed in Hpasawng Township after disappearing on 1 July. The KNDF claimed to have shot it down on 2 July.
  - The Myanmar military troops regained full control of Mobye town in Pekon Township, Shan State for the first time since November 2023.
- 12 July – A joint KNLA and PDF force captured the Ukrittah Myanmar Army camp 3 years after a previous attack was repelled. Close to 500 civilians and Tatmadaw soldiers fled to Thailand.
- 15 July – The Eastern Command of the Tatmadaw recaptured Nawnghkio from the TNLA and other anti-junta forces. The TNLA and allies initially captured the town in June 2024 during Operation 1027.
- 18 July – Junta conducts airstrikes in southern Sagaing Region to protect a flotilla of supplies heading up the Irrawaddy River, assumed to be en route to relieve the besieged forces in Bhamo.
- 20 July – the Mandalay PDF seize three bases in Htan Pin Kone, Mya Kan Thar, and Thayet Kai villages on the border of Madaya Township and Patheingyi Township, Mandalay Region.
- 23 July – The Tatmadaw recaptures Thabeikkyin in northern Mandalay Township with the help of a naval landing
- 27 July – A junta supply flotilla convoy travelling up the Irrawaddy River is ambushed in a narrow fast-flowing section north of Shwegu and is forced to turn back south.
- 28 July – PDF seize Lapat and Yin Taik Kone and two strategic villages in Kyaukkyi Township, Bago Region.
- 29 July – Junta airstrikes a NUG-run hospital in Kanbalu Township, Sagaing killing 15 civilians.
- 31 July –
  - Following the end of term meeting of state of emergency since 2021, the National Defence and Security Council convened to stipulate a series of change such as new commission, establishing Office of the National Defence and Security Council, new cabinet of Myanmar and imposed state of emergency and martial law to 63 townships in 9 states/regions of Myanmar.
    - The State Administration Council junta is replaced by direct governance through the NDSC, which has been led by Min Aung Hlaing since he assumed presidential duties in 2024. New cabinet of Myanmar was formed with former general Nyo Saw as prime minister.
    - Mawlaik Township PDF sets five Tatmadaw ships on fire on the Chindwin River.

=== August ===
- 1 August – Clashes intensify near Pala, Palaw Township in southern Myanmar with junta troops firing on civilians indiscriminantly.
- 3 August – A Tatmadaw kamikaze drone bombs the house of Saw Sein Win, an adjutant general of the Democratic Karen Benevolent Army.
- 7 August – According to the Chin Human Rights Organization, shootouts between armed groups and the Myanmar Police Force in Hakha result in the death of a police lieutenant.
- 8 August – The Chin National Army, National Liberation Army, Kuki National Army-Burma, and PDF repel a 3-day Tatmadaw attack in Tamu Township, Sagaing Region. 6 soldiers were killed and 9 weapons were captured while 5 guerrillas were killed and 3 weapons were lost.
- 10 August –
  - A Myanmar Navy ship sinks near Gwa Township, Rakhine State, after catching fire. Although the cause is not definitively known, witnesses speculate that the fire was accidental.
  - The Myanmar Air Force reportedly bombs the headquarters of KNU Brigade 7 in Hpa-an District 25 times. One civilian suffered minor injuries, and the KNU reported no fatalities.
- 11 August –
  - The Arakan Army and Arakan Rohingya Salvation Army clash near the Myanmar-Bangladesh border in Maungdaw Township. A man, Jibon Tanchangya, fled to Bangladesh and claims he was a member of AA. Khaing Thu Kha quickly denied the association.
  - General Gum Maw of the Kachin Independence Army reveals that the junta attempted to hold online peace talks. The Kachin Independence Organization offers to send a delegation to Myitkyina, but was met with no response.
- 16 August – A military airstrike hits Mogok. A TNLA spokesperson said about 21 civilians were killed and 7 injured; two locals speaking to the Associated Press said "that the death toll had risen to nearly 30".
- 17 August – A Tatmadaw base in Sagaing City is attacked by insurgents. A Buddhist novice monk was hit by stray gunfire. Reinforcements from the Central Regional Command in Mandalay were dispatched. No group officially claimed responsibility.
- 18 August –
  - The Arakan Army is pushed back south in the Battle of Kyaukphyu as junta forces take back the village of Gaw Du.
  - The KIA retakes villages near Indawgyi Lake from the Shanni Nationalities Army.
  - The Tatmadaw's counteroffensive in Northern Shan reaches Doe Pin village on the Mogok-Nawnghkio road.
- 20 August –
  - The Tatmadaw retakes Demoso from anti-junta Karenni and PDF forces.
  - The United Wa State Army declares that they would no longer provide weapons or financial aid to the TNLA, MNDAA, and Shan State Army - North.
  - Tatmadaw soldiers open fire in Hakha, critically injuring a man and wounding 2 schoolgirls.
- 24 August – The Goteik viaduct is destroyed, with the TNLA and the junta blaming each other for bombing it.
- 25 August – According to Colonel Naw Bu, the KIA captured the LIB 236 base during the Battle of Bhamo.
- 27 August – 11 Pyusawhti members escaped from a NUG detention center in Homalin Township during a clash between the PDF No. 1 Military Region and the HPDF 124 LPDF. 5 of the POWs were eventually recaptured.
- 28 August – The RCSS/SSA clashed with the Tatmadaw's LIB 335 and Lahu militias in eastern Shan State. According to the RCSS, 4 soldiers were killed.
- 29 August – The Arakan Army claimed that a Myanmar Navy ship caught fire after firing artillery at the ship between Cheduba and Ramree Island.

=== September ===
- 1 September – 2 children and 1 woman were injured after a Myanmar Air Force Harbin Y-12 bombs an IDP camp in Demoso Township, Kayah State.
- 2 September – PDF and KNLA forces ambushed a Tatmadaw convoy in Kyaukkyi Township, Bago Region. MA-series rifles and RPGs were captured.
  - PDF Military Region 1 announced that a junta convoy was ambushed in Nansaungpu, Kale Township, Sagaing Region. 4 people were killed and 7 were captured. Among the casualties were members of the Shanni Nationalities Army, National Socialist Council of Nagaland, and the United Liberation Front of Asom.
- 3 September – An 18-year-old man was killed by a Myanmar Air Force bombing in Kani Township, Sagaing Region.
- 5 September – The Tatmadaw recaptured the Pone Taung Alel Nat Htiek outpost in Magway Region. The outpost overlooked the southern Yaw Region and the KaPaSa24 Ordnance Factory.
  - The Tatmadaw started attacking Kyanthar Village in Kale Township, Sagaing Region, which is controlled by Chin rebels.
- 7 September – Arakan Army reports over 70 junta soldiers were killed and numerous weapons seized during clashes in the Irrawaddy–Magway Rakhine border areas.
- 10 September – An Arakan Army Coast Guard member and officer were killed by Bangladeshis who were allegedly poaching fish on waters near Rathedaung Township.
- 12 September – Bombs hit two private schools and killed at least 18 people in Thayet Thapin, located in Arakan Army-controlled Kyauktaw Township, Rakhine State. Although Tatmadaw media did not report Myanmar Air Force operations in the area, Khaing Thu Kha stated that the bombs came from a jet fighter.
- 14 September – 2 junior administration members of the Kachin Independence Organisation on motorcycles were shot and arrested by Tatmadaw troops in Myitkyina. Tear gas was also used to disperse residents.
- 17 September – The PDF and allied rebels captured several Tatmadaw and Shanni Nationalities Army bases near the town of Banmauk.
  - The Myanmar Paladin Force and Du Won groups, along with the Sagaing PDO attacked a police station in Zigon, Kanbalu Township, Sagaing Region. 6 police officers and soldiers died; 4 were captured, along with 12 weapons. 3 prisoners held in the jail were freed.
- 20 September – The PDF and the KIA capture the town of Banmauk in northern Sagaing Region.
- 22 September – ARSA insurgents attacked an Arakan Army base in Maungdaw Township. ARSA leaders claim the base was captured while Khaing Thu Kha stated the attack was repelled.
- 24 September – The Arakan Army launched a counteroffensive against RSO and ARSA militants north of Maungdaw , Rakhine State.

=== October ===
- 2 October – The junta recaptures the district-level capital town of Kyaukme from the TNLA as part of their ongoing counteroffensive.
- 9 October – The Kachin Independence Army captured several Tatmadaw camps and outposts in Bhamo Township and Waingmaw Township.
- 14 October – The junta recaptures Phataw junction that links Mandalay Region with Kachin State and Shan State.
- 15 October – The Arakan Army captured the Tatmadaw's Point 666 outpost in Padaung Township, Bago Region while simultaneously besieging the Nat Yay Kan Air Defence base.
- 16 October – A joint Chin National Army-Chinland Defence Force column raided the Myanmar Police Force Myoma station in Hakha. 15 prisoners were freed, and various weapons were seized.
- 17 October – The junta retakes Hsipaw in their ongoing counteroffensive against the TNLA.
- 19 October –
  - The Myanmar Air Force bombs the TNLA-controlled towns of Namhsan, Mogok, Mongngawt, and Mantong. 8 people were killed and 2 were injured.
  - The junta retakes Lay Kay Kaw with the Karen National Army.
- 20 October – The junta also takes Ingyinmyaing and Minletpan near Lay Kaw Kaw after a battle with the KNLA.
- 25 October – Chinese border crossings to Kachin State in the KIA-controlled towns of Kanpaikti, Laiza, Mongjaryang, and Lweje partially reopen. Food and construction materials are allowed to pass through, but fuel and electronics remain strictly controlled.
- 29 October – The TNLA announced a withdrawal of its forces from the towns of Mogok and Mongmit after two days of talks with the junta in Kunming, China. The PDFs then occupied positions in Mogok soon after.

=== November ===
- 3 November – A civilian and 3 police officers of the Karenni State Interim Executive Council's Karenni State Police Force are killed when the Myanmar Air Force dropped 4 bombs on a State Police Force station in Demoso Township.
- 5 November – The Pauk Township People's Defence Organisation clashes with junta troops near Thichauk Village. 7 soldiers were killed and 5 weapons were captured.
- 6 November – The PDF Thayet District 4th Battalion attacks a police station in Yè Nan Thar, Kamma Township. 7 police officers were killed. Simultaneously, rockets are launched at DDI Factory 12.
- 10 November – According to the Tatmadaw, the village of Thaing Chaung in Kyaukphyu Township and its dam is captured from AA.
- 11 November – The Arakan Army reported that at least 70 Tatmadaw soldiers are captured during clashes in regions of Ayeyarwady, Bago, and Magway.
- 12 November –
  - PDF forces ambushes a 100-strong junta column between Khin-U and Kanbalu townships in Sagaing Region. At least 50 troops and Pyusawhti militia were killed, along with 15 taken as prisoners of war.
  - The Communist Party of Burma PLA captures a Tatmadaw outpost in the Naypyidaw Union Territory.
- 14 November –
  - A coalition of rebel forces that included the KNLA and PDF captures the town of Mawtaung in Myeik District, Tanintharyi Region. 19 Tatmadaw soldiers fled to Thailand according to pro-military sources.
  - The Tatmadaw briefly occupy the Kyaukphyu Meteorological Radar Station in Minpyin, Kyaukphyu District, Rakhine State. A group of soldiers taking photos at the compound were then bombed by Arakan Army artillery.
- 17 November – The TNLA announces it will escort junta troops to Mogok.
- 18 November – American freelance journalist, Collin Mayfield, is severely injured by a landmine while accompanying PDF Zoland in Chin State. He is receiving medical treatment in Mizoram, India.
- 19 November – The Chauk Guerrilla Force ambushed a minivan used by the junta to transport prisoners to Magway prison. Among the 5 political prisoners was Naat Shine, a PDF commander who was sentenced under the junta's anti-terrorism laws to 200+ years in prison.
- 21 November – The KNLA raids a suspected scam syndicate compound guarded by a group of the Democratic Karen Benevolent Army. After a brief shootout, the KNLA detains a number of DKBA members and seized 176 weapons.
- 23 November – PDF units ambushes a force of 120 Tatmadaw soldiers in Wetlet Township, Shwebo District, Sagaing Region. Numerous soldiers were killed, and around 30 weapons were captured.
- 24 November – The TNLA positions itself around captured PDF positions in Mogok.
- 26 November-Chin Brotherhood forces attacks a checkpoint near Tedim that resulted in 2 POWs and large amounts of weapons captured.
- 27 November – PDFs and LPDFs ambushed junta troops in Shwebo District, Sagaing Region. The PDF claimed 20+ troops were killed.
- 28 November –
  - PDF and PLA forces attack Pyusawhti militias in Mu Tien, Taze Township, Sagaing Region.
  - Junta pushes north into Singu Township from Madaya and reinforce positions along the township border while also pushing south from Thabeikkyin.
- 29 November – Shan State Army-North clashed with a 100-strong Tatmadaw force near Pong Woe village in Kyaukme Township.
- 30 November
  - 4 migrant workers are injured in Mae Sot, Thailand, after shells from fighting in Myawaddy Township exploded.
  - PDF factions clashed with Tatmadaw troops near Mogok after the TNLA transferred control to the junta.
  - The KIA and PDF clash with Tatmadaw forces near Momeik after the TNLA transferred control to the junta.
  - PDF forces attack a Tatmadaw checkpoint in Letpadan Township, Bago Region. 5 soldiers died in the attack.

=== December ===
- 1 December –
  - Clashes reportedly break out with PDF forces after the Tatmadaw entered Mogok. Junta forces take control of a Mogok military base and other positions. Clashes between junta and PDF troops occur in western Mogok and eastern edge of Mogok township and PDF forces refrain from engaging the town itself. The Mogok-Mawnghkio road remains TNLA territory.
  - The Tatmadaw plans operations to take back Bawlakhe Township ahead of their planned elections. The Karenni resistance continues to control military camps between Bawlakhe and Hpasawng.
- 2 December – Tatmadaw troops reportedly destroy 64 houses in Pekhinkyaw, Taungtha Township, Myingyan District, with drones and artillery.
- 3 December – A captain of the Tatmadaw's LIB 257 resists capture by PDF in Yesagyo Township, Magway Region. He is promptly shot dead.
- 4 December –
  - PDOs in Phyu Township, Bago Region, clash with Tatmadaw troops. 1 was shot dead while 2 others were detained. Shortly after, a sergeant allegedly grabbed a PDO officer's pistol and both soldiers ran before succumbing to gunfire. 2 G3s were seized.
  - TNLA takes positions up to Myitsone village between Mabein and Momeik defending Momeik from the KIA. The Junta moves into both Mongmit and Mogok.
  - The Warazein Force use 4 FPV drones as "Operation Thunderbolt" to target the Ketumati air base in Taungoo, Bago Region; the drones hit jammers, a military training facility, and an air traffic control tower.
- 5 December – The KNLA and allied forces restart an offensive to recapture the remaining junta bases remaining on the Hpapun road that the junta recaptured in September. The junta's counteroffensive in the area had been stalled.
- 11 December – At least 33 people are killed and 76 injured when a junta jet drops two 500-lb bombs on a public hospital in Mrauk-U, Rakhine State.
- 12 December –
  - PDF and KNLA forces raid and burn government buildings in Yephyu, Tanintharyi Region. According to the Tatmadaw, no soldiers or police were killed or injured. However, anti-junta media claimed that the rebels killed and injured soldiers before destroying voting machines.
  - Junta pushes to within 10 miles of Singu in northern Mandalay Region.
- 13 December – ARSA clashes with Arakan Army on Kyi Kyun Island, Maungdaw Township, Rakhine State. AA claims that they suffered no casualties.
- 16 December – Various groups, including Myanmar Defense Force and Asho Chin Defense Force, raid junta outposts in Sintalin, Letpadan Township, Bago Region. 19 Tatmadaw personnel died in the raid, including a deputy police chief.
- 17 December – Units of the KNLA Brigade 4 briefly detain 44 PDF fighters, support personnel, and civilians in Tanintharyi Region. Although the exact reason remains undisclosed, a PDF fighter allegedly attacked a KNLA fighter to the point of unconsciousness. The detainees were eventually released a day later.
- 18 December –
  - PDO cells bomb the Patauk Chaung Police Station in Yangon's Hlaing Township with remote-controlled IEDs as part of Operation Flame.
  - - The Tatmadaw reetook Singu from the Mandalay People's Defense Force.
- 21 December – The PDF kill 3 Tatmadaw soldiers and capture 7 in Wuntho Township, Sagaing Region. The soldiers were a part of the 120th LIB of the 33rd Division.
- 23 December – PDF attack Sinphyukyun town in Salin Township, Magway; attacking positions on the bridge to the town's north and to the town's police station.
- 27 December – 2 drone bombs explode in Myawaddy, Karen State. 1 hit a USDP office while the others damaged 10 homes and a fire station. 1 person died and 10 suffered injuries. No group formally claimed responsibility.
- 28 December – Local PDF groups, including Brave Warriors for Myanmar and No More Dictatorship, fire rockets into Mandalay hours before the start of the 2025 Myanmar general election's first phase. 2 people suffered injuries.
- 29 December – Battles continue around Battalion 266 camp in southeastern Hakha city, as Hakha CDF contest the town.
- 30 December –
  - A junta military aircraft bombs Ngapali in Thandwe Township which resulted in at least nine deaths and injuring 15 others.
  - PDF captures positions in Budalin town, Sagaing Region.

== 2026 ==
=== January ===
- 1 January – The MNDAA retreated across the Hsipaw Bridge and closed checkpoints after a meeting with the Tatmadaw at the Two Elephants hotel in Lashio.
- 2 January –
  - Resistance forces entered the town of Katha in northern Sagaing, under contested artillery fire from the junta.
  - Tatmadaw began repairing bridges across the Irrawaddy River between Singu Township and Sagaing Region.
- 3 January – Chin National Army and Chin Brotherhood forces ambushed a Myanmar Army force in Khuangli, Falam Township. Two POWs and numerous weapons were captured.
- 4 January – The Arakan Army raided a Myanmar Army outpost in Padaung Township, Bago Region for 35 minutes. 10 soldiers (including Colonel Han Lin Aung of MOC 10) died.
- 5 January – Chin forces ambushed a Myanmar Army unit near Thaing Ngin in Falam Township, capturing many weapons and soldiers.
- 6 January – Naypyidaw PDF Battalion 903 and Natmauk Galon PDF ambushed a convoy escorting Union Election Commission official, Aung Lwin Oo. Surviving the attack, his personal assistant and several Myanmar Police Force officers were killed.
- 9 January – PDF forces attack over 12 Tatmadaw positions in Bago Region and capture the village of Taw Kywe Inn.
- 11 January – Clashes erupt near the Bangladesh border within the Arakan Army and Rohingya militants. Two Bangladeshi citizens including a child were shot, with the child being declared dead after undergoing a hospital treatment.
- 13 January – In recent fighting on the border between Rakhine and Bangladesh, the Arakan Army killed between 150 and 200 Rohingya militants, and about 50 fled to Bangladesh where they were captured by the Border Guard Bangladesh; it is believed that most of them belonged to the Arakan Rohingya Army.
- 14 January – Sein Lwin, the husband and second-in-command of Pyusawhti militia leader and former Thway Thout figure, Thida Yumon, is captured with drugs by Mandalay Region-based PDFs
- 18 January – A joint Tatmadaw-Shanni Nationalities Army force recaptured the majority of Banmauk, Sagaing Region, from the PDF. The PDF still control the Aung Thar Kone neighbourhood.
  - About 80 prisoners of war and convicts escaped from the Karenni IEC-controlled Prison No. 2 in Mese. One fugitive POW, Major Paing Soe Thu, was detained by Thai police in Mae Hong Son Province.
- 20 January –
  - An airstrike on an Arakan Army prison in Chaung Tu, Kyauktaw Township, kills 21 and injures 30 Tatmadaw POWs and their family members.
  - Junta forces reinforce south on the Tedim-Falam road near Thaing Ngin.
- 23 January – The KIA says a military airstrike on Htilin killed 21 and wounded 28, with some in critical condition. Per the Associated Press, KIA spokesperson Col. Naw Bu "said a jet fighter bombed a compound where mourners had gathered for prayers for the deceased, a camp for displaced persons, as well as a school and a village market."
- 27 January – Brave Warriors for Myanmar, No More Dictatorship PDF, and other groups use 107mm artillery against the Tatmadaw's Central Command in Mandalay Region after receiving reports of Min Aung Hlaing's presence there. Although exact casualty figures remain unknown, he survived the attack.
- 28 January – The Arakan Army, including allied forces, capture Point 666 hilltop base in Pandaung Township.
- 30 January – The Junta defends their position at the Min Pyin Radar base on the far south of Kyaukphyu as heavy fighting changes frontlines with the AA near the front.

=== February ===
- 1 February – Naypyidaw PDF 901 and New Society Army 31 launch 107mm artillery on the Tatmadaw's LIB 19 in Yedashe Township, Bago Region.
- 2 February – Captain Zarni Aung, a company commander of the Tatmadaw's LIB 381, is killed during clashes with the Kachin Independence Army near Hpakant. 6 soldiers then defected.
- 4 February –
  - A military paramotor bombs a monastery in Thetkeikyin, Monywa Township, Sagaing Region. A 50-year-old man and his 18-year-old son are killed, with over 4 injured.
  - ARSA lieutenant, Zahid "Lalu" Hossain Prakash, is arrested by Bangladeshi authorities in Kutupalong Refugee Camp on charges of murder.
- 6 February –
  - The Myanmar Air Force bombs Arakan Army positions at the former 15th Regional Operations Command building in Buthidaung Township.
  - Junta advances south to Nan Hpe from Hpruso in Karenni State.
- 8 February –
  - The Myanmar Air Force bombed a residential area in Thandwe. Two people suffered injuries, and nine houses were destroyed.
  - The Tatmadaw and the Shanni Nationalities Army recapture Banmauk from the PDF after the latter took the town on 22 September 2025, with skirmishes still occurring.
- 10 February – The People's Defence Force and Arakan Army launched a joint operation to capture four Tatmadaw military posts in Kanbalu Township, Sagaing Region. They killed 96 soldiers and took 101 prisoners of war.
- 12 February – At least seven civilians are killed and 16 injured by Myanmar Air Force bombing runs in Kyauktaw and Mrauk U townships.
- 13 February – KIA encircles Tatmadaw infantry battalion 58 more tightly.
- 15 February – Tatamdaw retakes villages north of Hpasawng and takes over most of Hpasawng. KNDF destroys bridge over the Salween River while retreating.
- 17 February – KNDF contests Hpasawng temporarily reentering the town.
- 20 February – Chinland Defense Force Hakha used FPV drones to attack a Tatmadaw camp and a Chin National Day celebration attended by the junta Minister of Border Affairs, Yar Pyae, at the Chin State General Administration Office. 18 junta officials escaped. CDF Hakha warned civilians on 17 February not to attend the ceremony.
  - A Myanmar National Airlines ATR-72-600 incurs damage to its nose, body, and taillights. It blames the damage on FPV suicide drones from the Kachin Independence Army and People's Defence Force. KIA spokesperson Naw Bu denies attacking the aircraft.
- 23 February – At least 10 civilians were killed and four injured when a military paraglider dropped bombs in Shwekyaungkan, Myinmu Township, Sagaing Region.
- 24 February – At least 18 civilians are killed and 15 injured by Myanmar junta airstrikes in Ponnagyun Township, Rakhine State.
  - A Tatmadaw drone strike killed five people—including Democratic Karen Benevolent Army members and civilians—at the Hpalu–Mekanei Road in Myawaddy Township, Kayin State.

=== March ===
- 1 March – Dawei National Liberation Army, Duraka Column, and other groups attacked a Tatmadaw checkpoint near Dawei Technological University. 3 soldiers died in the attack.
- 2 March – Local PDF groups drone bombed Tatmadaw soldiers collecting money in Koepin, Magway Region. The ambush inflicted 5 casualties, and the groups captured an MA-3 rifle.
- 3 March – The Arakan Army advanced to Kyay Taw, about 1 mile (1.6 km) from Sittwe.
- 5 March – Myanmar military forces killed 30 civilians in villages of Kyaukgyi Township, Nyaunglebin District and detained about 160 villagers as human shields after drone and airstrikes.
- 6 March – Arakan Army took Point 666 base in Padaung Township, closing in on the KaPaSa 16 arms factory.
- 7 March – PDF and KNLA forces conducted attacks and operations in Nyaunglebin Township, Bago Region, in retaliation for massacres committed by the Tatmadaw.
- 8 March – The Myanmar Air Force bombed an Arakan Army prison camp in Ann Township, Rakhine State. Initial reports estimate that 116 prisoners died and 32 were injured.
- 11 March –
  - Tatmadaw forces entered the town of Tagaung, Mandalay Region. Clashes continued in the area as the surrounding outskirts and a Chinese-owned nickel processing plant in nearby Tigyaing Township, Sagaing Region remained under PDF control.
  - The KNLA attacked and captured the Win Wa camp in Thayetchaung municipality, killing 50 Tatmadaw soldiers.
- 12 March – Tatmadaw forces fully captured Tagaung, Mandalay Region.
- 14 March – The MNDAA launched attacks against TNLA forces as part of an escalation of tensions over territorial control in Kutkai Township, Shan State. Since February 2026, both groups clashed with each other over control of territory in Kutkai Township; this led to price surges in basic goods from trade blockades.
- 16 March –
  - The MNDAA captures Kutkai and Nam Hpat Kar from the TNLA as the Three Brotherhood Alliance breaks down.
  - Karenni Nationalities Defense Force and allied groups ambush 5 Tatmadaw soldiers gathering water near Nanhpe.
- 19 March – According to pro-Tatmadaw media, 500 PDF members based in the Mandalay Region surrendered to the Tatmadaw. The Mandalay PDF disputed the true scale of the event; they claimed that many of those in the ceremony wore mismatched uniforms.
- 21 March – Warazein Force launched a precision strike using advanced FPV drones on a major combined checkpoint near Yeni Town, at the entrance to the Naypyidaw Union Territory. Reports indicated approximately seven junta casualties.
- 28 March –
  - Junta carries out drone attacks from 26 to 28 March on KNLA troops based near Kyondoe and Kawkareik.
  - KNU reorganises administration near Myawaddy, forming Ramadee Township.
- 29 March –
  - Seven civilians were killed and a school was destroyed in military airstrikes in Paletwa Township, Chin State.
  - Junta regained access to Kyondoe and Kawkareik, restoring power service to the towns.
  - Junta claimed to retake full control of Katha; resistance clarified that the strategic retreat was only from parts of the town and that the town remained contested.
- 30 March – The Steering Council for the Emergence of a Federal Democratic Union (SCEF) formed under the agreement of the Kachin Independence Organisation, Chin National Front, Karenni State Interim Executive Council, Karen National Union, National Unity Government, and the Committee Representing Pyidaungsu Hluttaw. A stated goal of the SCEF is "collective leadership [amongst EROs, democratic resistance forces, women's groups, and representatives of the people]."

=== April ===
- 1 April – The Tatmadaw regained full control over Htigyaing, after resistance forces withdrew following ammunition shortages and a long period of contestation.
- 2 April –
  - The Tatmadaw reopened the Asia Highway near Myawaddy.
  - The Tatmadaw continued attacking resistance-held towns by aerial bombardment and naval attacks, injuring and killing civilians in Thandwe, Paletwa, Kyaukphyu and Sittwe.
- 3 April – The Tatmadaw killed seven civilians with drones and guns in a Myingyan Township village.
- 4 April – The Mon Blood Army, a group formed on 28 December 2025, launched a rocket attack on the Tatmadaw's 316th Artillery Unit in Kalawt, Ye Township.
- 5 April – Chinland Defense Force-Asho entered the northern section of Ngape, Minbu District, Magway Region as a "show of force [against junta control]." No shots were fired.
- 7 April – A gunpowder factory in Pangsang Township, Wa State exploded. 10 died, and hundreds were injured. The factory reportedly operated to manufacture materials for mining operations.
- 14 April – The Chin Brotherhood and the Chin National Army captured a Tatmadaw camp in Khun Li, Falam Township. 24 MA-series rifles and a Starlink device were seized.
- 17 April – The Thai side of the Singkhorn Myanmar-Thailand border checkpoint opens while the Myanmar side remains closed in the KNU-controlled border town of Mawtaung.
- 18 April – 21 Local PDF militias in Magway Region agreed to join the command of the Magway Unit Federal Government.
- 19 April – At least one local resident was killed and 14 were injured in a military airstrike in Ponnagyun and Mrauk-U townships, Rakhine State.
- 20 April – Min Aung Hlaing invited opposition armed groups to participate in new peace talks by 31 July 2026, as part of a proposed 100-day stability program. The KNU, CNF, and ABSDF rejected the offer, vowing to continue fighting.
- 21 April – Xu Qin, chairman of the Standing Committee of the Heilongjiang Provincial People's Congress, met with Min Aung Hlaing in Naypyitaw, the first visit by a high-level foreign official since his inauguration.
- 22 April –
  - Following a meeting with Min Aung Hlaing, Thailand's Minister of Foreign Affairs Sihasak Phuangketkeow says that he supports Myanmar's return to ASEAN and that Min Aung Hlaing is considering "good things" for detained Aung San Suu Kyi.
  - The KNDO, KNLA, and KNDF attacked Tatmadaw forces stationed near Aung Chan Thar Ywar Thit Monastery in Lewe Township, Naypyidaw Union Territory, killing 10 troops, including a major.
- 24 April –
  - Min Aung Hlaing issued new emergency ordinances imposing martial law and 90-day emergency periods across 60 townships.
  - A splinter group of the Moebye PDF clashed with a merger of KNDF and PDF units in Shan State over territorial disputes; reportedly, seven rebels and one civilian suffered casualties. The group's leader, Aung Min, is facing a court-martial by the Karenni IEC.
- 25 April –
  - Chinese Foreign Minister Wang Yi visited Naypyitaw and met with Min Aung Hlaing and Union Minister for Foreign Affairs U Tin Maung Swe.
  - The Tatmadaw recaptured Falam, Chin State, including Surbung Airport.
- 28 April – Junta retook Kangyi village in Saw Township, Magway Region near Mindat, Chin State.
- 30 April –
  - The junta retook Indaw after a nine-day campaign from reinforcements that got to Katha marching to Indaw.
  - State television reported that former leader Aung San Suu Kyi was transferred from prison to house arrest. However, her legal team and son, Kim Aris, state they could not independently verify her location or health.
  - Ye Belu PDF attempted to assassinate Tun Yee, a commander of the Democratic Karen Benevolent Army.

=== May ===
- 3 May – The Battalion 3801 Hero PDF attacked junta troops at the Myo Chaung gate near Gyobingauk, Bago Region. The PDF claimed seven soldiers were killed.
- 4 May – Arakan Army launched an offensive against the military's military base and outposts in Padaung Township, Bago Region, killing more than 20 military personnel and seizing weapons and ammunition.
- 5 May – The junta retook Maw Luu shortly after taking Indaw. Following three days of fighting en route to the town, the battle at Maw Luu began at 4 am, and junta troops entered the town by 9:30 am after heavy artillery and drone use, taking the town by mid-day.
- 6 May –
  - KIA takes a position, causing junta troops to rout from Say Yone Gone base in Long Hkin (Lawng Hkang) near Hpakant, Kachin State.
  - The military Junta launched drones and bombs on Phunom village in Tedim township, Chin State, killing 10 people, which included four policewomen from PDF-Zoland.
- 7 May – Three people, including a child, were killed and about 10 others were injured by military regime bombing in Minbya and Kyauktaw townships in Rakhine State with jet fighters and Y-12 aircraft.
- 10 May – Arakan Army and allied forces including BPLA, and PDF-MDY, attack military convoy in upper Sagaing region killing at least six Junta soldiers and destroying two military vehicles.
  - AA starts attacking the Tatmadaw Artillery Battalion 344 in Yegyi Township, Ayeyarwady Region.
- 12 May – 5 soldiers from Light Infantry Division 33 defect to the PDF in Sagaing Region.
- 13 May – Arakan Army and allied resistance forces seize control of a junta outpost defend by more than 100 troops in Natmahokekalay Village, Indaw Township of Sagaing Region.
- 16 May – PDF captures the Saingpyin Police Station in Depayin Township during Operation OTT. 11 Myanmar Police Force officers and Tatmadaw soldiers died.
- 19 May –
  - The Tatmadaw recaptured the town of Mawdaung, Tanintharyi Region, from KNLA and PDF forces, after a long counteroffensive launched from Thephyu village.
  - Tatmadaw forces, aided by the ZRA, captured Tonzang from the Chin National Army.
  - More than 100 homes were burnt in Sane town, Kyaukphyu Township, by a Myanmar military airstrike.
- 23 May – In Operation Tamar Myay, PDF groups captured a Pyusawhti camp in Thayetkan, Magway Region after a day of fighting. Four soldiers and militia were killed; 70 started retreating. The PDF also seized 11 M1 Carbines and six Greener Police Guns amongst other matériel. The rebels reportedly rescue 49 civilians.
- 24 May – PDF forces ambushed a Tatmadaw/Pyusawhti convoy on the Myingyan-Taungtha road, killing four militiamen and injuring eight soldiers.
- 27 May – Myanmar military bombards Sane town, Kyaukphyu Township. Around 10 homes and shops were destroyed, and an elderly man was killed.
- 28 May –
  - After 3 days of disputes and clashes, the Student Revolutionary Force LPDF reaches an agreement with NUG to cease parallel administrations and arrests before integrating into a PDF unit.
  - Chin Defence Force - Asho, New Society Army, and the PDF ambush a Tatmadaw convoy in Minbu Township, Magway Region, seizing various rockets, rifles and munitions from a Sinotruk.
- 30 May – Arakan Army kills over 30 junta soldiers and seizes large amount of ammunition in an intense fighting near the Taung Maw U Naval Base.
- 31 May – A warehouse storing gelignite in TNLA-controlled Kaungtup, Namhkam Township exploded, killing at least 45 people and injuring 70.

=== June ===
- 1 June – 21 Bagan LPDF, Popa Guerrilla Force, and CPB PLA clash with a Tatmadaw force east of Tandar, Taungtha Township starting 31 May. 10 soldiers reportedly died.
- 3 June – PDF capture the Tatmadaw's Hswarmakyi camp near Hswar, Bago Region. 19 soldiers and a major died, and multiple weapons seized.
- 5 June – PDF took Kokkosu village and the police station in Yepyay, a village at the intersection of the Myaing-Pauk road and the Pauk-Pakokku road.
- 10 June –
  - PDF captured Myitche police station, killing 2 junta troops, capturing 14 POWs and seizing various weapons.
  - Junta began attacking Thantlang to retake the city, starting a long urban battle with the CDF.
- 12 June – Five Tatmadaw soldiers died from a KNLA-PDF joint raid on a checkpoint near Kawtbein, Kawkareik District. Rebels captured three weapons.
- 13 June – PDF and Karenni forces ambushed a joint Tatmadaw-PNA force near Mobye. At least 15 soldiers and PNA milita died.
- 14 June – Junta forces re-entered Myitche, bringing troops and heavy artillery across the river from Nyaung U.
- 15 June – Sit Nyein Naing, the leader of the Sagaing PDF under the Spring Revolution Alliance, is arrested by NUG PDF.
- 16 June – PDF ambushed a convoy in Seikphyu Township, Magway Region. Nine soldiers and a captain died. Eight weapons, 240 5.56 rounds, and two grenades were among the items captured.
- 17 June – The Tatmadaw bombed Kyauktaw Township with five fighter jets for nearly an hour, killing 12 civilians and injuring nearly 20 others.
- 20 June – Arakan Army and allied forces captured parts of Point 188 military junta hilltop base camp and seized weapons in Yekyi Township, Ayeyarwady Region.
- 22 June – PDF units under the NUG's Myingyan District Command raided camps of the Communist Party of Burma's People's Liberation Army. The CPB condemned the raids as sparking infighting and potential confrontation.
- 23 June – Guerrillas in Magway Region, including the Magway PDF, use FPV drones to damage a Myanmar Air Force Mi-17 in Myaing Township.
- 27 June – The Arakan Army announced the capture of 3 Tatmadaw bases in Yegyi Township, Ayeyarwady Region, after a reported failed Myanmar Army counteroffensive targeting Gwa Township, Rakhine State between 17 and 21 June.
- 29 June – People's Defence Force Battalion 22 raided three camps belonging to Ko Ar Kuu's People's Security Force (PSF) in Monywa Township, Saigaing Region, after previous accusations of extortion.
- 30 June – Urban clash in Thantlang remains heavy with the junta accused of using chemical weapons in their attack on the CDF.

=== July ===
- 2 July – The Myanmar Air Force bombs an Arakan Army POW camp in Kyein Chaung, Maungdaw Township, Rakhine State. A Tatmadaw doctor with the rank of captain, and 3 Rohingya militants from ARSA and RSO died.
  - PDF and PDO units ambush a Tatmadaw and Myanmar Police Force column in Eingyitaw, Mahlaing Township, Mandalay Region. The PDF kill 2 personnel, capture 10 POWs, and seize 20 pieces of equipment.
- 3 July –
  - The Arakan Army reportedly captured two Tatmadaw outposts near Point 227 in Ngayokaung Subtownship, Pathein District, Ayeyarwady Region.
  - The Tatmadaw takes Padamyar Hill, near Ma Mon Kaing village, Mohnyin Township in the southwestern Indawgyi Lake region.
- 4 July – The Tatmadaw announced the capture of several villages in Indaw Township, Sagaing Region from PDF control, including Mae Zar.
- 5 July – The Tatamdaw takes outposts near Lon Ton, further north up the western side of Indawgyi Lake in Mohnyin Township.
- 6 July – The junta begins a campaign south towards Lay Kay Kaw by heading through the mountains from Myawaddy to approach the town from the south.
- 8 July – Barrages from Myanmar Navy ships hit the town of Kyeintali in Gwa Township, Rakhine State. Six civilians in Ward 3 suffered injuries.
- 9 July – Four rockets exploded near the Northeastern Regional Military Command in Lashio, Shan State, killing a pregnant woman and injuring another woman. Although the Tatmadaw blamed the MNDAA, MNDAA representatives denied responsibility.
- 13 July – After a 2-week battle, PDF forces took the outpost near Shinhla village in Madaya Township, before being forced to retreat.
- 16 July – The Junta recaptures Thantlang, securing the town.
- 19 July – On Martyrs' Day, the Myanmar Air Force bombed Arakan Army-controlled Rakhine State settlements in Ma Ei, Taungup District. Explosives hit Ponnagyun Township and Thandwe Township as well. Five people died, and 29 suffered injuries.
- 23 July – The NDAA arrest an official of the NUG's People's Defence Organisation. The Tatmadaw take custody.
- 25 July – PDF forces attack the Shwepan checkpoint on the Naypyidaw-Myothit Township (Magway Region) road. 9 Tatmadaw soldiers died, a howitzer was destroyed, and multiple weapons were seized.
- 29 July – The Junta begins conscripting "one [ Rohingya ] from every household" in Sittwe.
- Late July – AA withdraws from Kyat Tein, Kan Tha Pyay and Kan Dee village tracts, keeping the frontline near Kyaukphyu between Minpyin and Zaingchaung villages.

=== August ===
- 1 August – The AA and junta clashed in Yonepin, Yegyi Township, as the junta continues to attempt to break back into southern Rakhine.
- 4 August – The KIA captured Shwe Phone Myint, on the National Highway 43, after junta troops withdrew. Junta troops returned to contest it shortly after.
- 5 August – Wa State representatives met with Min Aung Hlaing in Naypyidaw to discuss political concessions and other cooperation measures.
- 6 August – Junta troops under Karen National Army command started heading south towards Minletpan near Myawaddy.
- 7 August – The junta searched and destroyed houses believed to belong to the SSPP in Momeik Township.
- 11 August – Clashes erupted between the Tatmadaw and a combined KIA-PDF force in the village of Nyaungni, Momeik Township.
- 12 August – The Tatmadaw attacked Arakan Army positions near Point 101 between Yegyi and Thabaung townships in Ayeyarwady Region. AA repels the attack and seizes multiple weapons.
- 16 August – The Myanmar Air Force bomb Kinpan with two fighter jets. Four people were killed. A day before, former BNRA commanders, Daung Nyo and Sudha Raja, escaped from a CDM hospital where they were receiving treatment.
- 21 August – 14 people were killed in a junta airstrike on a Buddhist monastery in Swel Le Oh village in Myaung township, west of Mandalay.
- 29 August – PDFs (including the Dawei National Liberation Army) ambushed a Myanmar Army convoy on Ye-Dawei Union Road 8 near the Dawei Special Economic Zone in Tanintharyi Region.

=== September ===
- 2 September – Tatmadaw troops and their families surrendered to the KIA after six ships traveling on the Ayeyarwady River from Shwegu to Bhamo were attacked by drones and gunfire from late August 2026.
- 7 September – Tatmadaw gyrocopters and helicopters bombed a vehicle repair shop in rebel-controlled Ye-U Township, Sagaing Region. Seven civilians died.
- 10 September – A PDF-operated FPV drone hit a Myanmar Air Force Yak-130 at the Tada-U Air Force Base near Mandalay International Airport. A reinforcing convoy was also ambushed where a Tatmadaw colonel died.
- 13 September – At least 80 Tatmadaw prisoners of war held by PDF Zoland escaped after assaulting the guards and seizing weapons. They were previously given permission to bathe outside the prison camp's grounds.
- 14 September – Reverend Dal Thawn Tuang, a Baptist pastor based in Lamzang, Tedim Township, was killed during a clash between PDF Zoland and Tatmadaw soldiers after the prisoners escaped.
- 18 September – The Arakan Army repelled a push by the Tatmadaw into Ponnagyun Township from Sittwe as part of the latter's Operation 4926. Four soldiers were taken prisoner in addition to an estimated range of 30-40 casualties.
- 21 September – Arakan Army and Tatmadaw forces clashed in Mindon Township, Magway Region. The AA killed at least 11 troops and captured at least 30 weapons.
- 24 September – The Myanmar Air Force bombed a NUG Special Region Command headquarters on the border of Bago Region and Mon State. Six people died, including defector and military analyst, Nay Win Aung.
- 26 September – Shan State Army - North forces clashed with two Ta'ang National Liberation Army members near Minkone, Kyaukme Township, after a dispute at a checkpoint over uniforms. Both TNLA members died. The families received a total of 4,000,000 kyat in compensation.
- 28 September – The Myanmar Air Force bombed the "India" Market in Arakan Army-controlled Kyauktaw, Rakhine State. At least between 50 people died in the bombing.

=== October ===
- 1 October – The Myanmar Air Force reportedly bombed towns in Thayetchaung Township, Tanintharyi Region despite massive floods in the area.
- 2 October – The KNLA and PDFs attempted to capture a Pyusawhti camp in Gwaycho, Yesagyo Township. Heavy Tatmadaw fire support forced them to retreat with three wounded. 10 militiamen and soldiers were killed.
- 4 October – The Myanmar Air Force bombed an IDP camp in Ponnagyun Township 6 days after the India Market airstrike. Six civilians died.
  - Mushroom foragers in Myaing Township, Magway Region, discovered a mass grave containing the suspected remains of 12 men who disappeared after being detained by Tatmadaw forces on 9 June 2023.
- 12 October – PDF and KNLA forces overran a Tatmadaw outpost near Magyikone, Palaw Township, Tanintharyi Region. According to the KNLA, 10 soldiers died, and five suffered injuries.
- 19 October – Colonel Zaw Myo Tint of the 72nd Armoured Military Operations Command was killed by the Eagle Brothers LPDF after grabbing a weapon in an escape attempt in Sagaing Region. He was captured a day before on a tip-off related to extortion at checkpoints.
- 22 October – The KIA and PDF captured a joint Tatmadaw-Shanni Nationalities Army base in Taung U, Homalin District. Numerous artillery shells and weapons were captured.

=== November ===
- 1 November – The Myanmar Air Force bombed Ngwe Taung Pauk, Mrauk-U Township, Rakhine State. A free clinic was hit, resulting in the deaths of five people, including an infant.
- 3 November – Taungtha PDF assassinated a Pyusawhti commander, Pyit Phyo Maung. His wife was also killed after allegedly attempting to grab a weapon from the PDF. He was accused of torturing opponents of the Myanmar regime.
- 8 November – The Tatmadaw captured the PDF's Special Region Military Command headquarters, along with four other rebel bases, near the border of Bago Region and Mon State.
- 11 November – The Kagabu People's Force captured three Rawang Pyusawhti leaders in Kawnglanghpu Township near the Chinese border, with the Kachin Independence Army planning to take charge of POW arrangements.
- 12 November – An Air Force bombing run in Mrauk-U killed two university students and damaged various buildings; including a primary school built by Bridge Asia Japan.
- 16 November – PDF Zoland announced that a 25-person convoy that included Deputy Minister of Border Affairs, Major General Kyaw Kyaw Han, was ambushed with mines. The convoy was traveling from Falam to Tedim. Although the exact number of casualties remain unknown, state-run Myanmar International reported that Kyaw Kyaw Han completed an inspection tour in Falam on 18 November.

== See also ==
- List of engagements during the Myanmar civil war (2021–present)
