= Golden Valley Warriors =

Myanmar guerrilla armed group

- ရွှေတောင်ကြားစစ်သည်တော်အဖွဲ့
- Wars: internal conflict in Myanmar

The Golden Valley Warriors (Burmese: ရွှေတောင်ကြားစစ်သည်တော်အဖွဲ့; abbreviated GVW) is an urban guerrilla armed group in Myanmar.

== History ==
On May 22, 2025, retired lieutenant colonel and former Myanmar ambassador to Cambodia Cho Tun Aung was assassinated in Yangon, marking one of the highest-profile targeted killings since the military coup in 2021. He was shot multiple times outside his residence in Mayangone Township while returning from a gym session.

Cho Tun Aung had previously served in Myanmar's Tatmadaw, and was active as a political science lecturer after his diplomatic career. He was also a member of the country's War Veterans Organization. According to the Golden Valley Warriors, Cho Tun Aung played a key role in training military cadres and supporting the junta's counterinsurgency efforts.

The assassination was claimed by the Golden Valley Warriors group, who stated that his activities directly contributed to military operations targeting resistance groups. Myanmar's state-run media later confirmed his death, underscoring the severity of the attack.

Observers viewed the assassination as a psychological blow to the junta and a sign of growing sophistication among urban guerrilla forces.

Between 23–29 May 2025, SAC's security forces arrested 16 individuals, including a six-year-old girl, allegedly connected to the assassination plot. This group purportedly included the gunman Myo Ko Ko, his family, a hospital owner accused of treating him, and community members involved in providing support or coverage for the act.

== See also ==
- Timeline of the Myanmar civil war (2021–present)
