= Dawsiei =

Dawsiei ဒေါဆီအီ
- Village
- Location in Myanmar (Burma)
- Coordinates: 19°33′59″N 97°05′10″E
- Country: Myanmar
- State: Kayah State
- District: Loikaw District
- Township: Demoso Township
- Village tract: Dawtawku village tract
- Time zone: UTC+6.30 (MMT)

Dawsiei (Burmese: ဒေါဆီအီ; also spelt Dawsieei) is a village in the Dawtawku village tract, Demoso Township, Kayah State, Myanmar. The village is located about 10 miles west of Demoso, on the road to Loikaw.

On 5 February 2024, the Myanmar Air Force carried out an airstrike on an elementary school in the village, killing at least four children and injuring ten.
