= Spring Revolution Alliance =

Military alliance in Myanmar

- နွေဦးတော်လှန်ရေးမဟာမိတ်တပ်ပေါင်းစု
- Dates active: November 2025 – present
- Groups: Bamar People's Liberation Army; Karenni Nationalities Defence Force; Student Armed Force; Chin Brotherhood; People's Independence Army; Burma Liberation Democratic Front; 96 Soldiers PDF; Generation Z Army; Bamar Army; Force for Federal Democracy; Danu People's Liberation Front; Magway PDF; Mon State Revolutionary Force; National Liberation Army; Kalay Revolution Force; Pa-O National Defense Force; Sagaing PDF; Yaw Army; Yaw Defense Force
- Active regions: Myanmar
- Ideology: Federalism
- Wars: the internal conflict in Myanmar

The Spring Revolution Alliance (SRA) is a coalition of rebel groups and ethnic armed organisations in Myanmar that spans across many regions. Initially, in May 2025, representatives from 7 groups conceived of a military alliance to reform command and coordination structures. A total of 14 groups then conducted a preliminary meeting on the first week of November 2025. After a conference that lasted from 21 November to 24 November, a total of 19 groups allied.

Leaders of the SRA claimed that the groups share a common goal of human rights, gender equality, and federalism; they also stated that talks are in progress to integrate more factions.

While the SRA is not under the command of the National Unity Government, the NUG welcomed the alliance and vowed collaboration.
