= Hsipaw Township =

Hsipaw Township သီပေါမြို့နယ်
- Township
- Thibaw Township
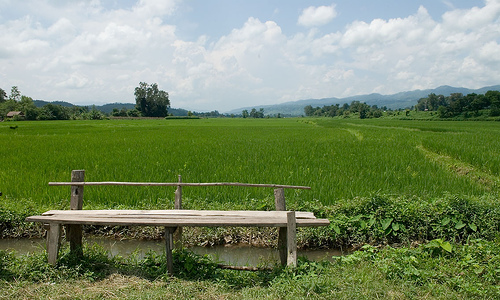

- Location in Kyaukme district

- Location within Myanmar
- Coordinates: 22°37′0″N 97°18′0″E
- Country: Burma
- State: Shan State
- District: Kyaukme District
- Elevation: 1,380 ft (420 m)
- Time zone: UTC+6:30 (MMT)

Hsipaw Township, officially Thibaw Township (Burmese: သီပေါမြို့နယ်), is a township of Kyaukme District in the Shan State of eastern Myanmar. The main town is Hsipaw.
