= Battle of Alaw Bum =

Battle in the Myanmar civil war

Battles of Alaw Bum
- Part of the Myanmar civil war (2021–present) and the Myanmar conflict
| Date | 25 March 2021 (first battle); 11–14 April 2021 (second battle) |
| Location | Alaw Bum Hill, Momauk Township, Kachin State, Myanmar 24.712117°N 97.488365°E |
| Result | KIA victory |

Belligerents
| Kachin Independence Army | State Administration Council |

Strength
| Unknown | 100+ |

Casualties and losses
| Unknown | >100 killed, 38 taken prisoner |

The battles of Alaw Bum were a series of engagements that took place during the early days of the Myanmar civil war on the Alaw Bum Hill in Momauk Township, Kachin State. The Kachin Independence Army attacked and captured the Alaw Bum military base forcing out State Administration Council defenders and repelling future assaults on the base. The Alaw Bum base is located on the China-Myanmar border near the KIA headquarters in Laiza.

== Timeline ==
=== First Battle ===
The Kachin Independence Army's battalion 25 and 10, alongside soldiers from the Northern Alliance, seized the Mong Pouk and Sheng Htong posts at the base of Alaw Bum hill on the evening of 24 March around 5:30pm. The KIA troops then attacked and captured the Alaw Bum military base on the 25 March, after an 11-hour-long battle with the Tatmadaw.

According to Kachin Independence Organisation spokesperson Colonel Naw Bu, the decision to attack was made after the Tatmadaw provoked the KIA by launching artillery attacks from Alaw Bum onto the KIA's Ferlam Bum outpost on 22 March.

=== Second Battle ===
On the 11-14 April, the Tatmadaw conducted multiple assaults on the Alaw Bum military base in response to a Northern Alliance attack on a police station in Naungmon. The Tatmadaw's Light Infantry Battalion 320, consisting of 2 columns of about 100 troops, attacked the Alaw Bum military base. Only two or three soldiers of the initial attack on 11 April survived.

An additional column from Light Infantry Battalion 387 was sent to attack the following day. The Myanmar Air Force used fighter jets, making 14 sorties to the hill during the attack between 7am and 10pm on 12 April. The air strikes targeted KIA frontline positions, with the majority striking in quick succession around 1pm. According to local residents, the jets crossed the border into China at one point, before returning after China fired warning shots. Two artillery shells fired by Tatmadaw ground troops landed on the Chinese side of the border around 2pm and 5pm. The battalion commander of Light Infantry Battalion 387 was killed during the fighting on 12 April, according to KIA sources.

The fighting slowed down until it ceased altogether by 14 April. The KIA arrested 38 remaining Tatmadaw soldiers after the battle ceased.

== Consequences ==
The capture of the airbase, provided the Kachin Independence Army public support and attention. The Tatmadaw continued to attempt to recapture the base periodically, suffering heavy casualties each time. The battle of Alaw Bum would remain the only attack directly commanded by the KIA, with later battles being led by NUG-aligned brigades. The capture of the base strategically stopped artillery attacks on key KIA bases and IDP camps as the Alaw Bum airbase lies close to the KIA headquarters in Laiza.

On 30 April, the 77th Light Infantry Division attempted to retake the hill alongside six air raids. At least 20 soldiers were killed as the Tatmadaw failed to retake the hill.
