= Phunom =

- Location in Burma
- Coordinates: 23.2833°N 93.7333°E
- Country: Myanmar
- Administrative division: Chin State
- District: Falam District
- Township: Tiddim Township

Population (2014)
  - Total: 2,149
- Time zone: UTC+6.30 (Asia/Yangon)
- Sunrise: 06.58
- Sunset: 17.54

Phunom is a village in Tiddim Township, Chin State, Myanmar. In the 2014 Myanmar census, the population was 2,149.

It is located in the west of the country, near the border with India.

== History ==
=== Myanmar civil war ===
Radio Free Asia reported that on 6 May 2026, the military launched two bombing attacks that killed at least three civilians and seven soldiers, including four female PDF-Zoland soldiers. An AG church was reportedly destroyed.
