= Special and Choice =

Special and Choice (S&C)
- S&C (မီးဘေး၊ စစ်ဘေး၊ ပညာရေး ကူညီစောင့်ရှောက်ရေးအဖွဲ့)
- Formation: 2021
- Founder: Soe Moe Aung
- Type: Non-profit humanitarian organization
- Purpose: Humanitarian aid, education, and healthcare
- Headquarters: Sagaing Region, Myanmar
- Region served: Sagaing Region and Magway Region
- Founder: Soe Moe Aung

Special and Choice (S&C), also known as the S&C IDPs Aid Group, is a Myanmar-based humanitarian organization. Established in 2021, the group provides emergency assistance to internally displaced persons (IDPs) and victims of arson and conflict within the Sagaing Region and Magway Region.

The organization's relief efforts are concentrated in several townships, including Yinmabin, Salingyi, Pale, Tabayin, and Shwebo.

== Activities ==
S&C focuses on the distribution of essential supplies, including food, potable water, and medicine, to conflict-affected populations. A core component of its mission is the construction of temporary housing for individuals whose homes were destroyed by fire. Between its inception in 2021 and 2024, the organization constructed approximately 1,400 shelters across Sagaing and Magway.

=== Education and Water Access ===
To support education for displaced children, S&C provides school materials and establishes temporary learning spaces. The group also implements water-infrastructure projects, such as drilling artesian wells in areas facing severe water shortages.

== Incidents ==
Due to the volatile security situation in its areas of operation, the organization's members have faced risks. On 21 June 2023, an S&C volunteer was arrested at a security checkpoint in Yinmabin Township while en route to deliver humanitarian aid.
