= Myanmar Royal Dragon Army =

Ethnic armed organisation in Myanmar

- Myanmar Royal Dragon Army (2022-Sep 2023); Burma National Revolutionary Army (Sep 2023-Feb 2026) မြန်မာ့တော်ဝင်နဂါးတပ်တော် (2022-Sep 2023) ဗမာအမျိုးသားတော်လှန်ရေးတပ်မတော် (Sep 2023-Feb 2026)
- Burma National Revolutionary Army logo
- Leader: Bo Nagar
- Founded: 1 January 2022
- Dates active: January 1, 2022 –February 18, 2026
- Active regions: Pale Township, Sagaing Region, Mandalay Region
- Size: 1000+

The Myanmar Royal Dragon Army (MRDA; Burmese: မြန်မာ့တော်ဝင်နဂါးတပ်တော်), also known as Myanmar's Royal Dragon Army, was an armed resistance organisation based in Pale Township, Sagaing Region. It was founded on 1 January 2022 by its leader, Bo Nagar, and was under the command of the National Unity Government. The Myanmar Royal Dragon Army was reformed and renamed as the Burma National Revolutionary Army (BNRA; Burmese: ဗမာအမျိုးသားတော်လှန်ရေးတပ်မတော်) on September 9, 2023.

== History ==
Flag of the Myanmar Royal Dragon Army (2022-2023)

In February 2022, the MRDA announced it had attacked two bases near the villages of Ziphyugone and Einmahti alongside another resistance groups. The MRDA claimed that around 40 junta troops and Pyusawhti militia members had been killed.

In late April 2022, the MRDA attacked a number of outposts in Pale held by the Tatmadaw and Pyusawhti, a pro-junta militia. The MRDA also ambushed junta forces which it claimed were raiding villages and burning civilian homes.

=== Reorganization ===
On 14 March 2022, MRDA troops from Yinmabin District were restructured into Yinmabin District People's Defence Force battalions- specifically Yinmabin PDF Battalions 3 through 6. The battalation were also additionally funded by the NUG on top of existing financial support from donations totaling around eUSD 260,000 to date.

=== Renaming ===
Later on 9 September 2023, Bo Nagar announced that the remaining parts of MRDA was to be renamed as the Burma National Revolutionary Army (BNRA) and stated that their group would not be under the NUG's chain of command. Political analysts Than Soe Naing remarked this change as a step towards creating a Bamar EAO. BNRA claimed that they intend to work together with the National Unity Government, with whom they met on September 12, 2023 to discuss NUG’s chain of command as well as the cooperation of BNRA with NUG’s administrative and defense mechanisms.

=== Tensions with the National Unity Government ===
On 9 January 2026, PDF forces under the National Unity Government of Myanmar raided four BNRA checkpoints in Pale Township, Sagaing Region. NUG claimed that locals complained about the BNRA extorting money at these checkpoints. A day before, the BNRA alleged that NUG planned to attack them and stated that they will be considered an enemy. On 17 January 2026, the BNRA raided a NUG tax office and checkpoint in Pale Township. Bo Nagar denied ordering the attack. On 17 February 2026, the PDF attacked three camps with artillery and drones. Ni Ni Kyaw, the General Secretary of the Communist Party of Burma's PLA appealed to both sides for negotiations.

== Surrender of Bo Nagar ==
On 18 February 2026, State Security and Peace Commission media reported that Bo Nagar, his family, and his associates surrendered all weapons to the military. Multiple reports noted that they were picked up by Tatmadaw helicopters. 150 other BNRA members were taken into PDF custody. NUG registered 7 criminal cases against Bo Nagar and other BNRA members including charges of rape and killing PDF fighters. The day after, NUG's Ministry of Defence stated that arrangements will be made for innocent BNRA members who wish to join PDF or PDO units. The Yinmarbin PDO also requested rebel units to report any weapons supplied by BNRA, and stressed proscriptions against destroying, selling, caching, or renting out such weapons. However, no official announcements specified the formal dissolution of the BNRA.

Four former members of the BNRA were among the ranks of Pyusawhti militias captured by Chinland Defence Force and PDF units after an October 2026 counterattack on Tatmadaw forces in Kanpetlet Township.
