= Salingyi =

Salingyi ဆားလင်းကြီး Sarlingyi
- Town
- Location in Burma
- Coordinates: 21°58′23″N 95°04′55″E
- Country: Myanmar
- Region: Sagaing Region
- District: Yinmabin District
- Township: Salingyi Township
- Elevation: 108 m (354 ft)
- Time zone: UTC+6.30 (MST)

Salingyi is a town in Salingyi Township, Monywa District, Sagaing Region in Myanmar. It is the administrative seat for Salingyi Township, and is at a tri-crossroads with roads heading north-west to Yinmabin, north to Monywa, and south-west to Kyadet. On the east of town, there is a large textile mill which was completed in 2005.
