= Kyaw Myo Min =

Burmese journalist (born 1985)

- ကျော်မျိုးမင်း
- Born: 27 October 1985; Yekyi Township, Ayeyarwady Region, Myanmar
- Citizenship: Burmese
- Education: Yangon University of Economics
- Occupations: Journalist; reporter
- Years active: 2010–present
- Organization: NP News
- Known for: Editor-in-chief and founder of Akon Thi Media and the current NP News
- Notable work: Founder and editor-in-chief of NP News and Akon Thi Media
- Children: 2
- Awards: Media Professional Excellence Award
- Website: https://npnewsmm.com/

Kyaw Myo Min (Burmese: ကျော်မျိုးမင်း, pronounced [t͡ɕo̰ mjo̰ mɪ́ɴ]; born 24 October 1985) is a Burmese journalist and the founder and editor-in-chief of NP News, a media outlet that gained significant attention after the 2021 military coup in Myanmar. Known for his role in Myanmar's polarized media landscape, Kyaw Myo Min has become a prominent figure, with NP News positioning itself in support of the military government and in opposition to the anti-coup resistance.

== Early life and education ==
Kyaw Myo Min was born on 24 October 1985 in Yekyi Township, Ayeyarwady Region, Myanmar (Burma). He completed his primary and secondary education in his hometown before attending the Yangon University of Economics, where he earned a degree in economics. His background in economics later complemented his work in the media industry, where he shifted his focus to journalism.

== Career ==
Kyaw Myo Min began his journalism career in 2010 at Shwe Myanmar News Journal in Yangon, shortly after completing his studies in Yekyi Township. Later that year, he joined Pyi Myanmar News Journal, where he worked for more than five years, gradually advancing from reporter to senior reporter. In 2016, he founded Akon Thi Media, where he served as both editor-in-chief and administrative officer.

While working at Akon Thi, Kyaw Myo Min gained attention for his outspoken views. In April 2020, he drew criticism for a Facebook post referencing Aung San Suu Kyi, in which he expressed frustration toward those who labeled him a traitor, controversially stating they should be “swept away with the coronavirus.” The post was met with public backlash and internal pressure from publishers.

On 26 January 2021, during a press conference held by the Tatmadaw True News Information Team at the Military History Museum in Nay Pyi Taw, Kyaw Myo Min openly questioned military officials about public dissatisfaction with the 2020 general election. His exchange with Major General Zaw Min Tun led to a heated discussion. Shortly thereafter, he resigned from the press team.

Following the 2021 military coup in Myanmar, Kyaw Myo Min launched NP News, a news outlet that quickly became known for its pro-military stance. Unlike many media organizations that supported the National Unity Government (NUG) or anti-coup movements, NP News presented reporting aligned with the military's views, frequently referring to the NUG and People’s Defense Forces (PDF) as “terrorists.” Under his leadership, the platform gained recognition among pro-military audiences and maintained regular solo broadcasts covering political and national developments.

On 19 September 2023, Kyaw Myo Min participated in a meeting in Tokyo, Japan, alongside two Japanese opposition lawmakers, Dr. Aye Maung, and Daw Sandar Min. The gathering, which focused on support for a military-led election, drew attention from opposition figures. The following month, on 13 October 2023, he was presented with the Media Professional Excellence Award by Nepal-based Season Media, in recognition of his role in journalism.

=== Controversies ===
Kyaw Myo Min's leadership of NP News has attracted significant scrutiny within Myanmar's media landscape. The outlet's editorial direction, particularly its coverage of opposition groups such as the National Unity Government (NUG) and the People’s Defense Forces (PDF), has drawn criticism from pro-democracy activists, independent journalists, and international observers. Many have accused NP News of providing a platform that favors the military regime's perspective, particularly in its portrayal of anti-coup movements.

Critics argue that NP News presents an imbalanced view of the ongoing conflict in Myanmar, often labeling opposition groups as “terrorists” while failing to adequately cover human rights abuses and the military's actions. Some observers contend that its editorial stance undermines the efforts of the NUG and other resistance groups, which are fighting against the military's control.

Despite the backlash, NP News continues to operate within Myanmar, unlike many other independent outlets that have been forced into exile or shut down due to the junta's suppression of media freedom. The outlet’s continued presence highlights the complex and polarized nature of Myanmar's media environment, where competing narratives of the country’s political crisis persist.

In addition, NP News has been the subject of personal attacks from foreign-based media outlets, including Khit Thit Media, which has published content targeting Kyaw Myo Min specifically. These external criticisms reflect the broader international debate over media freedom and the role of journalism in Myanmar's ongoing crisis.

== Personal life ==
Kyaw Myo Min is married and has two children. Given the politically sensitive environment in Myanmar, individuals in the media and political fields, like Kyaw Myo Min, often choose to keep details of their personal lives private for security reasons. As a result, his public persona is largely defined by his work in journalism, particularly his leadership of NP News.
