= Kyadet =

Kyadet ကျားတက် Kyatat
- Town
- Location in Burma
- Coordinates: 21°50′50″N 94°56′05″E
- Country: Myanmar
- Region: Sagaing Region
- District: Monywa District
- Township: Salingyi Township
- Elevation: 126 m (413 ft)
- Time zone: UTC+6.30 (MST)

Kyadet is a town in Salingyi Township, Monywa District, in southern Sagaing Region, Myanmar. Kyadet is at a crossroads with one route going north-east to Pale, one running north to Salingyi, and a third running south-east to Lingadaw.
