= Ye Yint Aung (general) =

Burmese army brigadier general and director

His Excellency Brigadier General Ye Yint Aung
- ရဲရင့်အောင်

Director of Public Relations and Psychological Warfare of the Myanmar Army
- Incumbent
- Assumed office 27 March 2026
- Appointed by: National Defence and Security Council
- Prime Minister: General Nyo Saw
- Deputy: General Kyaw Swar Lin
- Leader: Senior General Min Aung Hlaing
- Preceded by: Major General Zaw Min Tun

Personal details
- Born: Myanmar
- Citizenship: Myanmar
- Education: Defence Services Academy
- Occupation: Army general and military officer
- Website: https://www.moi.gov.mm/moi:eng/

Military service
- Allegiance: Myanmar
- Branch/service: Myanmar Army
- Rank: Brigadier General

Brigadier General Ye Yint Aung (Burmese: ရဲရင့်အောင်) is a Burmese army general who currently serves as the Director of Public Relations and Psychological Warfare of the Myanmar Army following his appointment on 27 March 2023 succeeding Major General Zaw Min Tun after he was purged following an investigation. He also serves as a spokesperson for the Myanmar Army and Information Team Leader for the National Defence and Security Council.

== Military career ==
Ye Yint Aung began his military career in the Tatmadaw after he was appointed as Director of Public Relations and Psychological Warfare of the Myanmar Army on 27 March 2023, replacing Major General Zaw Min Tun after he was purged following the case. In this position, he oversees the military's information apparatus, psychological operations, and media relations. He also formerly served in the Tatmadaw True News Information Team and as Military Attaché to Bangladesh.

Following his appointment as director, he became military spokesperson for the Information Team and also for the National Defence and Security Council. He is responsible for managing the Myanmar military's public messaging, handling state media operations, and controlling the official flow of information regarding the military and political affairs. He took over all of these duties after the Myanmar military government purged Major General Zaw Min Tun.

He was also appointed as Deputy Minister of Information of Myanmar on 27 March 2023, alongside his communication and psychological warfare roles.

Ye Yint Aung also presented awards and certificates of honor at the 81st Armed Forces Day Ceremony on 27 March 2026 at Bayinnaung Villa in Naypyidaw. Along with him, General Kyaw Swar Lin, senior Tatmadaw officers from the office of the Commander-in-chief, the Commander of the Naypyidaw Command, officials guest attended the ceremony and led the event.

He also participated and led in increasing friendship and cooperation of the Myanmar military and the Royal Thai Armed Forces to exchange and discuss culture and arts, and led the Myanma Tatmadaw Cultural Team along with other 51 senior official members.
