= Alaungdaw Kathapa Pagoda =

Buddhist pagoda in Kani Township, Myanmar

- အလောင်းတော် ကဿပဘုရား
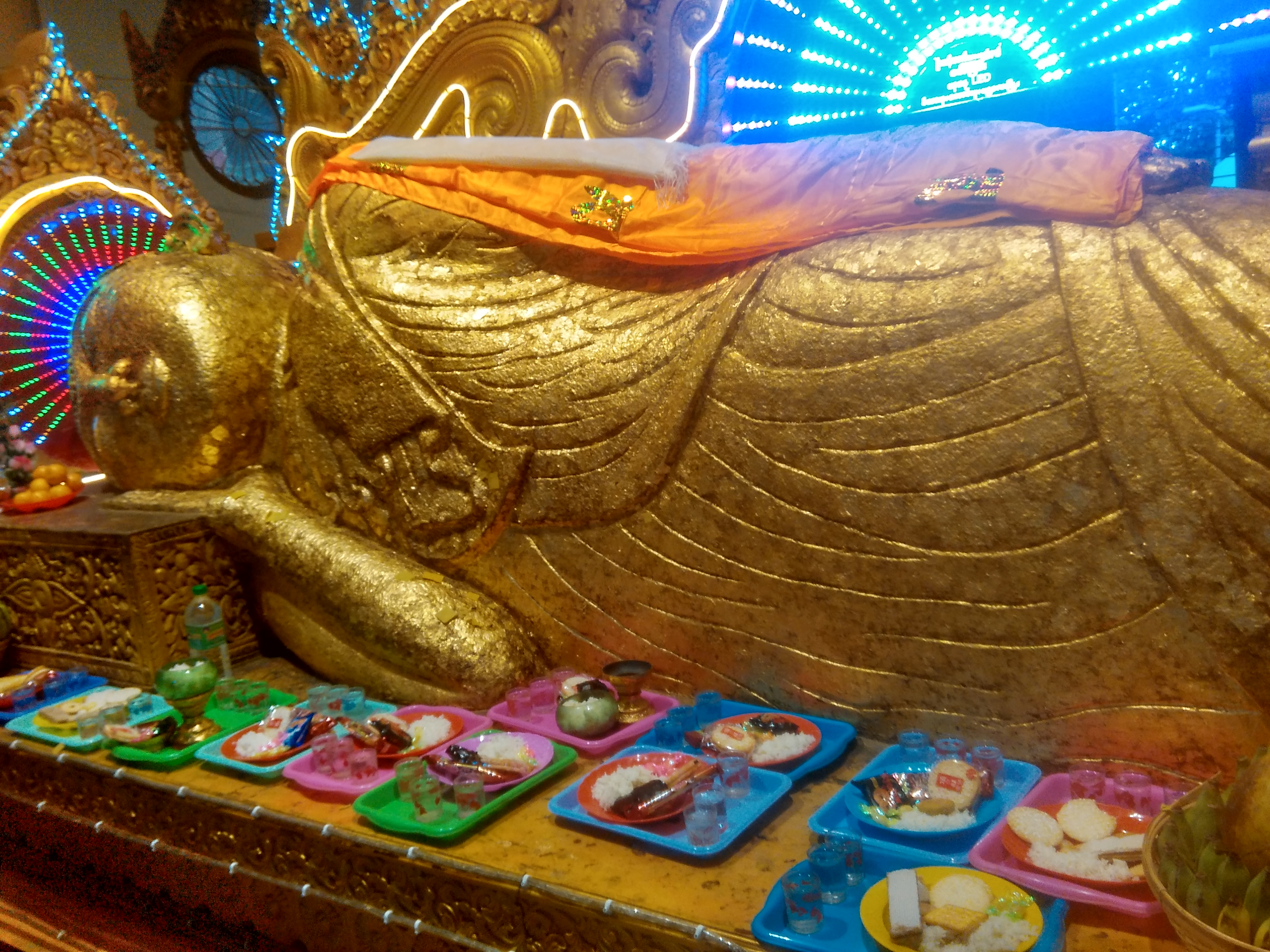

- Location within Burma

Religion
- Affiliation: Theravada Buddhism

Location
- Location: Yinmabin District, Kani, Myanmar
- Country: Myanmar
- Coordinates: 22°23′N 94°25′E

The Alaungdaw Kathapa Pagoda (Burmese: အလောင်းတော် ကဿပ ဘုရား) is a Buddhist pagoda located in Kani Township, Sagaing Region, Myanmar.

According to local lore, the cave at the pagoda holds the preserved remains of Mahākāśyapa (Maha Kathapa in Burmese), a principal disciple of the Buddha.

== Geography ==
The Alaungdaw Kathapa Pagoda is located at the center of the Alaungdaw Kathapa National Park in Kani Township, Sagaing Region.

== Pagoda festival ==
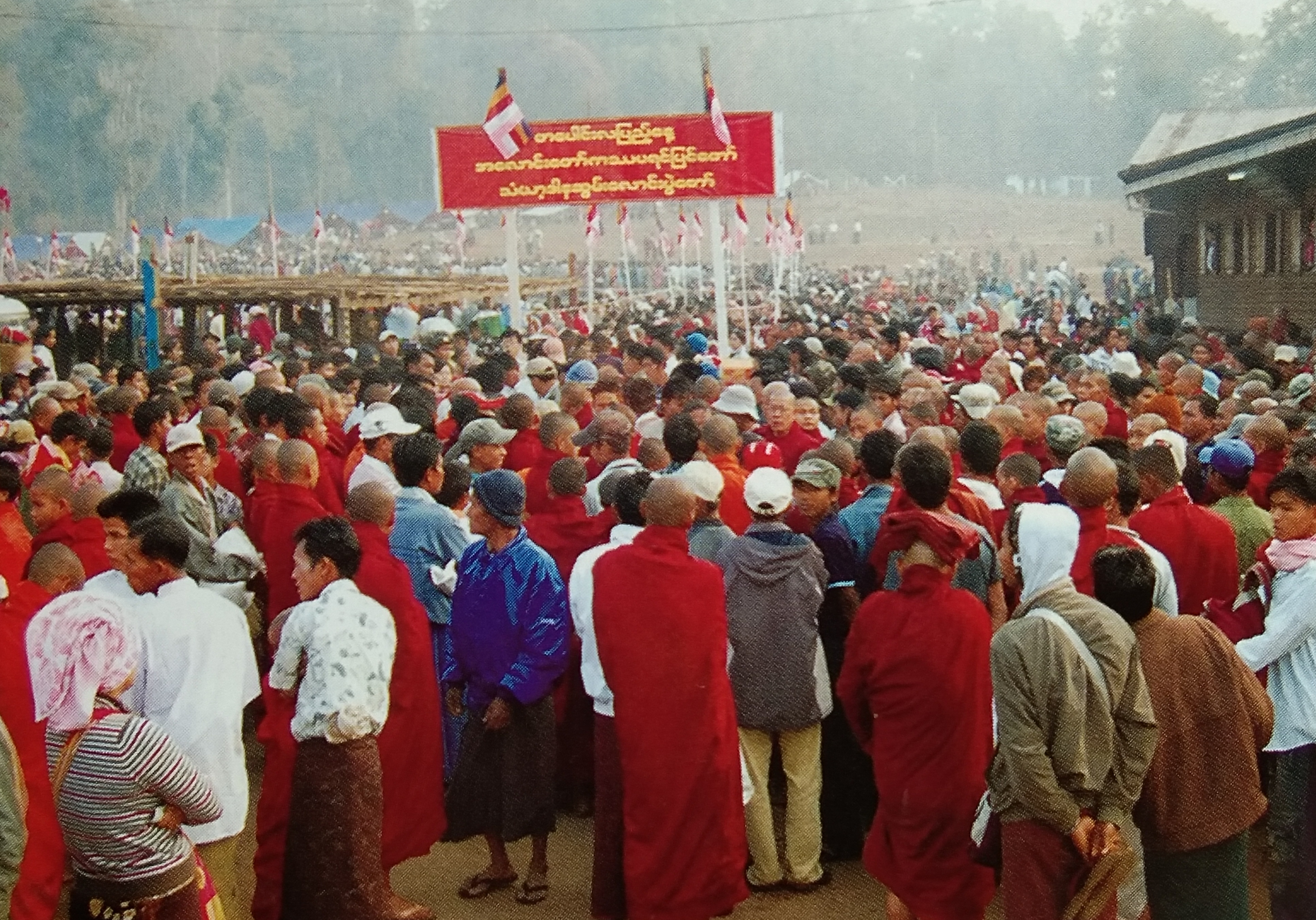

The pagoda festival of Alaungdaw Kathapa Pagoda takes place annually on the full moon days of two consecutive months (Tabodwe and Tabaung). Thousands of pilgrims make the trip to the pagoda, starting with about 50 to 100 pilgrims per day in Tabodwe (~February) and peaking at around 7,000 to 8,000 on the full moon day of Tabaung (~March). Some make the trip perhaps not just to attend the pagoda festival but also to enjoy the scenery of one of Myanmar's main national parks.
