= Pyapon Taung Shinma =

Burmese spirit associated with Mount Pyapon, Sagaing

Pyapon Taung Shinma (Burmese: ပြာပုံတောင်ရှင်မ; lit. 'Venerable Lady of the Mount Pyapon'), originally known as Me Phyu, is a Burmese nat (spirit) associated with Mount Pyapon near Monywa in the Sagaing Region of Myanmar. She is venerated in local tradition as a guardian of the mountain and is the subject of multiple accounts concerning her origin, life, and spiritual transformation. According to one version of the tradition, Me Phyu was born through a virgin birth and became renowned for her exceptional beauty. An alternative tradition describes her as one of two sister guardian spirits of the mountain who was reborn in the human realm. Local tradition associates her with a curse said to affect her native village and with customs requiring offerings of jewelry at her shrine before such items are worn.

== Depictions ==
=== First account ===
According to the Official History of Nats, Pyapon Taung Shinma was originally known as Me Phyu, a native of Pyaung Pya village near Yinmabin during the Pagan era. She is said to have been born through a virgin birth, following an incident in which her mother was bitten by a black ant. Her maternal uncle, who resided in the nearby village of Let Kaung, reportedly severed all ties with the family due to shame over the pregnancy.

At Me Phyu's naming ceremony, her mother invited her estranged brother in an attempt at reconciliation. She waited by the roadside with mont (traditional snacks) to welcome him. When he did not attend, she is said to have been overcome with grief and threw the snacks into a nearby stream, which subsequently became known as Mont Pyit Chaung, or "the stream where the snacks were thrown."

As Me Phyu matured, she became renowned for her beauty. Her uncle, noticing this, sought to arrange a marriage between her and his own son. Her mother, still resentful of his earlier abandonment, rejected the proposal. Angered by the refusal, the uncle informed King Kyansittha of Pagan about a woman of extraordinary beauty in the village who was deemed worthy of becoming a queen. When the king prepared to take her as a consort, Me Phyu reportedly bit off her own index finger to prevent her selection, believing that a physical imperfection would disqualify her from entering the royal court.

When King Kyansittha brought Me Phyu into the palace, he reportedly noticed her missing finger. Considering her physically incomplete, he declined to make her queen and instead assigned her a lower status. While in this position, she is said to have fallen in love with Maung Ngon, the royal betel server. The couple allegedly fled the palace and sought refuge on Mount Pyapon, located on the western bank of Monywa along the route to the Alaungdaw Kathapa Pagoda.

Mount Pyapon, however, was associated with a tragic past. According to tradition, in a previous life Me Phyu had resided there as a spirit alongside a female companion. The companion, resentful that Me Phyu had taken a mortal husband, is said to have orchestrated a tiger attack that killed Maung Ngon. Heartbroken by his death, Me Phyu died shortly afterward and returned to the spirit world.

=== Second account ===
In an alternative version of story, Mount Pyapon is described as having two peaks, referred to as the "Old Mountain" (Taung-O) and the "Main Mountain" (Taung-Ma). According to this account, two sisters originally resided there as guardian spirits. The younger sister, Me Phyu, wished to experience life in the human realm. The elder sister agreed but required a solemn vow that Me Phyu would never marry. Following this agreement, Me Phyu was reborn through a virgin birth.

Me Phyu is said to have broken her vow by marrying and bringing her husband to Mount Pyapon. In response, the elder sister reclaimed her life, but not before ensuring the couple would not be discovered by the king's soldiers. Afterward, the elder sister appointed Me Phyu as the guardian of the mountain, earning the title Pyapon Shinma (Lady of Pyapon) and authority over the mountain. The elder sister was subsequently released from her existence as a nat and ascended to a higher realm.

Local tradition holds that Me Phyu harbored resentment toward Pyaung Pya village, whose inhabitants had assisted soldiers searching for her. She is said to have cursed the village, ensuring that despite fertile land and hard labor, its people would remain impoverished, and that women of exceptional beauty born there would face tragic fates in adulthood. Her spirit is also believed to resent being denied fine clothing and jewelry in life. Visitors to Mount Pyapon are traditionally required to remove and conceal necklaces, bracelets, and earrings; failure to do so is thought to provoke her jealousy, potentially bringing sudden storms or darkness that disorient and frighten them.

=== Encounter with Ashin Wayama ===
According to Putee Saik Ko Tway Hmat Tan (ပုတီးစိပ်ကိုယ်တွေ့မှတ်တမ်း, "Personal Records of Rosary Recitation") by Venerable Ashin Wayama Bhivamsa, the seventh Sayadaw of Kyaw Aung San Htar, an event is said to have occurred in 1954 during his pilgrimage to Alaungdaw Kathapa. During the journey, Me Phyu is described as having manifested and guiding the Sayadaw along the path.

When the Sayadaw inquired about the ancient curse she had placed on Pyaung Pya village, Me Phyu is said to have replied that she had released her past anger and would no longer uphold the curse. Upon hearing this, the Sayadaw uttered sadhu (well done) and conferred a special gatha (religious verse) upon her. He instructed her to recite the verse with her prayer beads for three rounds each day, explaining that this practice would elevate her spiritual status. According to the account, Me Phyu followed these instructions and returned to the Sayadaw eleven days later to report that her powers had increased, and that she had attained the rank of bhummaso, a higher guardian deity of the earth.

== Beliefs ==
Women from Pyaung Pya, Myo Gyi, and surrounding areas observe a custom intended to appease her spirit. Before wearing beads, earrings, or other jewelry, they first offer these items at Me Phyu's shrine. Local tradition further maintains that, as a consequence of her curse, the villagers remain burdened by debt despite the land's capacity to yield up to three harvests annually. It is also believed that whenever a woman of exceptional beauty is born in the village—according to some accounts, once every three years—she is destined to meet a tragic fate.

In 1174, during the reign of King Narapatisithu of Pagan, the Venerable monk Kassapa is said to have died in the valley between the Pontaung Ponnya and Mahura mountain ranges. The site later became known as Alaungdaw Kathapa. Near this site, King Narapatisithu is also believed to have built and donated a shrine, or spirit palace, dedicated to Pyapon Taung Shinma.
