= Phowintaung =

Myanma cave complex

Phowintaung Cave Complex
- ဖိုလ်ဝင်တောင်
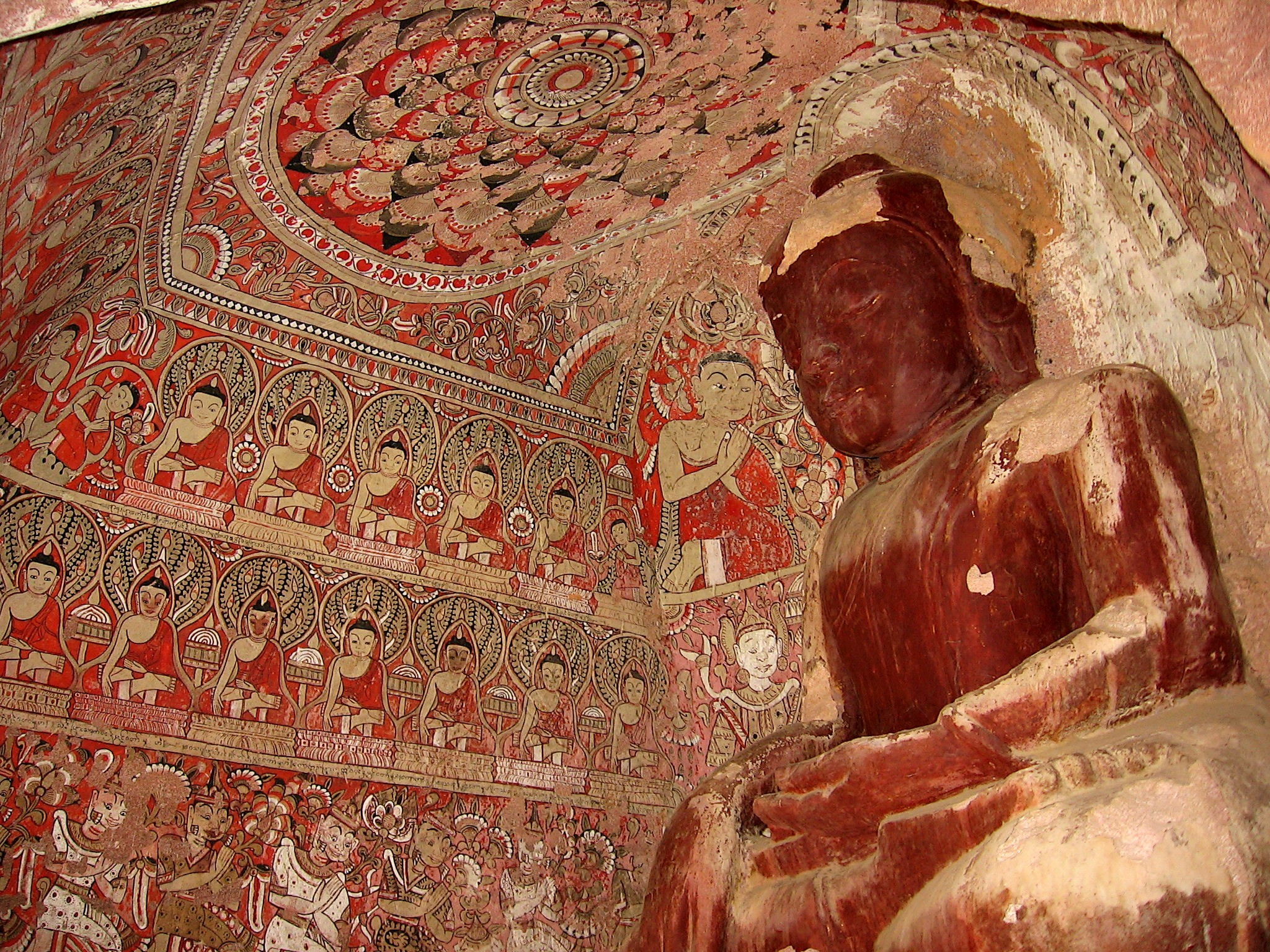
- A Phowintaung Buddha statue with murals

- Location within Burma

Religion
- Affiliation: Theravada Buddhism

Location
- Country: Myanmar
- Coordinates: 22°02′44.46″N 94°59′3.03″E

Architecture
- Completed: 14th century

Phowintaung (Burmese: ဖိုလ်ဝင်တောင် IPA: [pʰo wɪ̀ɰ̃ tàʊɰ̃], also spelt as Hpowindaung, Powintaung, Po Win Taung) is a Buddhist cave complex located approximately 25 kilometres (16 mi) west of Monywa and 10 kilometres (6.2 mi) southeast of Yinmabin, in Yinmabin Township, Monywa District, Sagaing Region, Northern Burma (Myanmar). It is located on the western bank of the Chindwin River. The name of the complex means Mountain of Isolated, Solitary Meditation.

The complex contains 947 small and large richly decorated caves. It is carved into a sandstone outcrop and contains numerous carved Buddha statues and mural paintings of geometric patterns and Jataka stories. The statues and paintings have been dated to between the 14th and 18th centuries.

== Accessibility ==
It is accessible from Monywa either by direct road over the new bridge or by a ferry across the Chindwin followed by a jeep ride from the scenic Nyaungbin village.

== Gallery ==
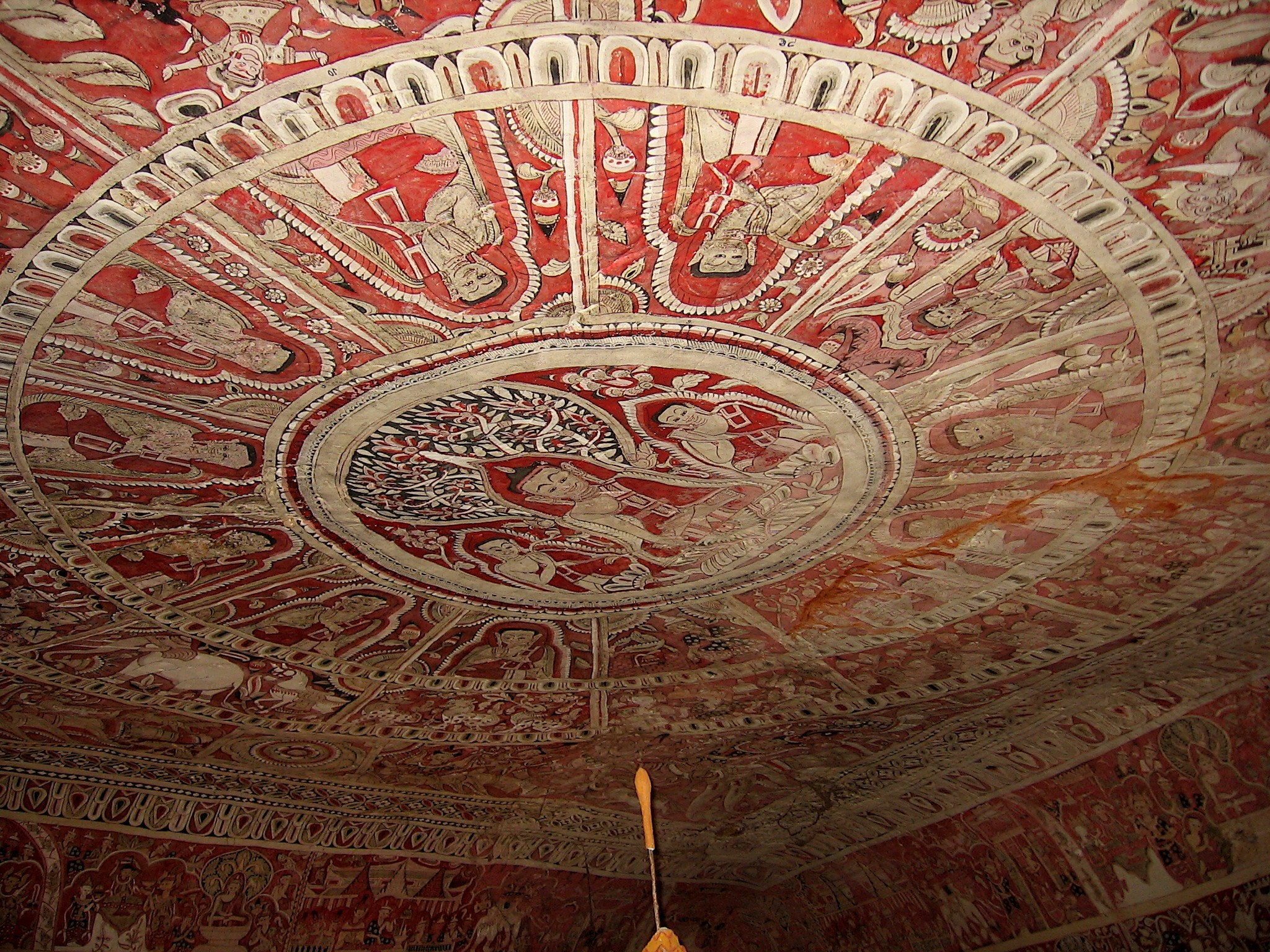
Ceiling vault with depiction of Buddha

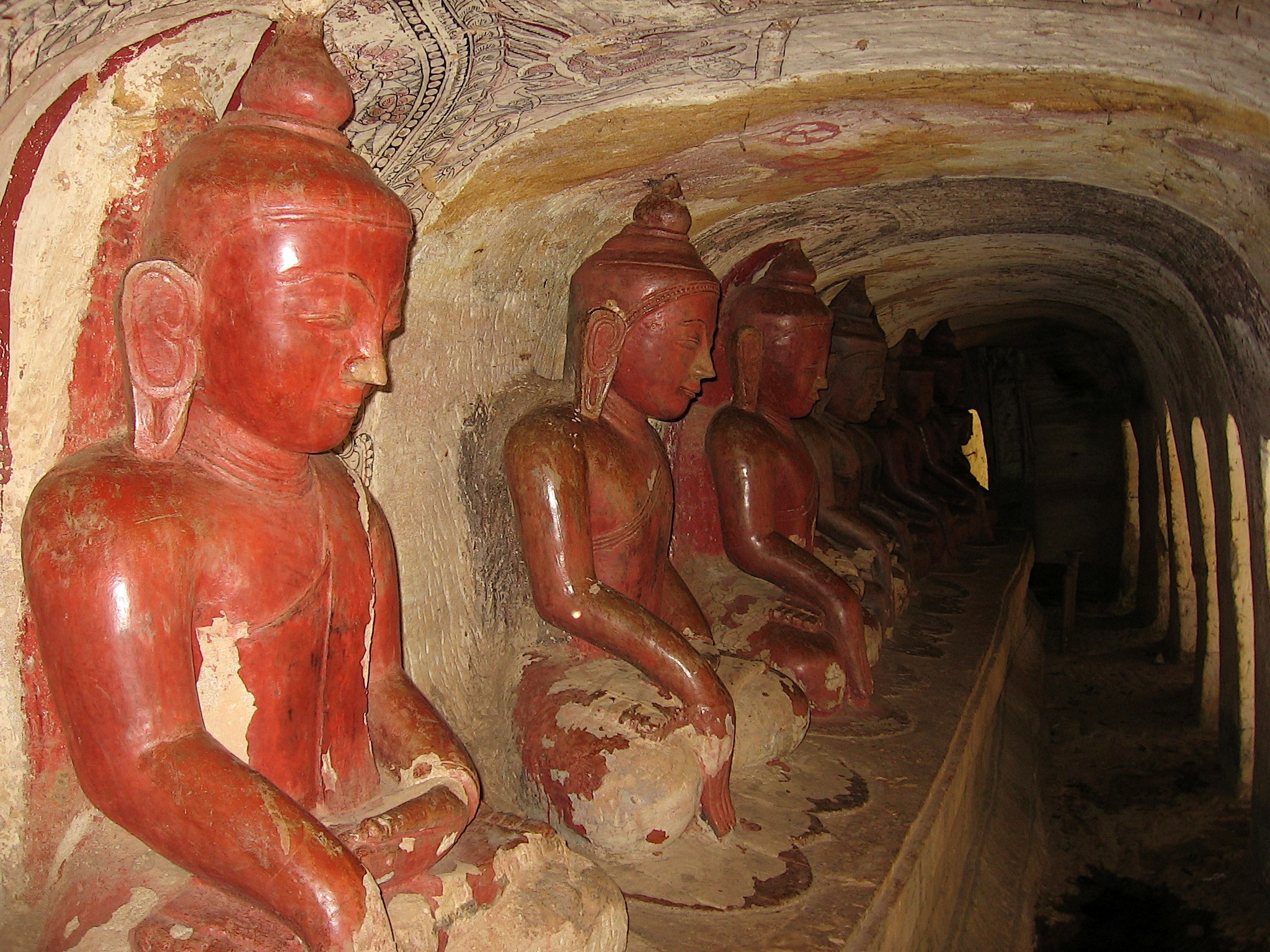
Buddha-lined passageway

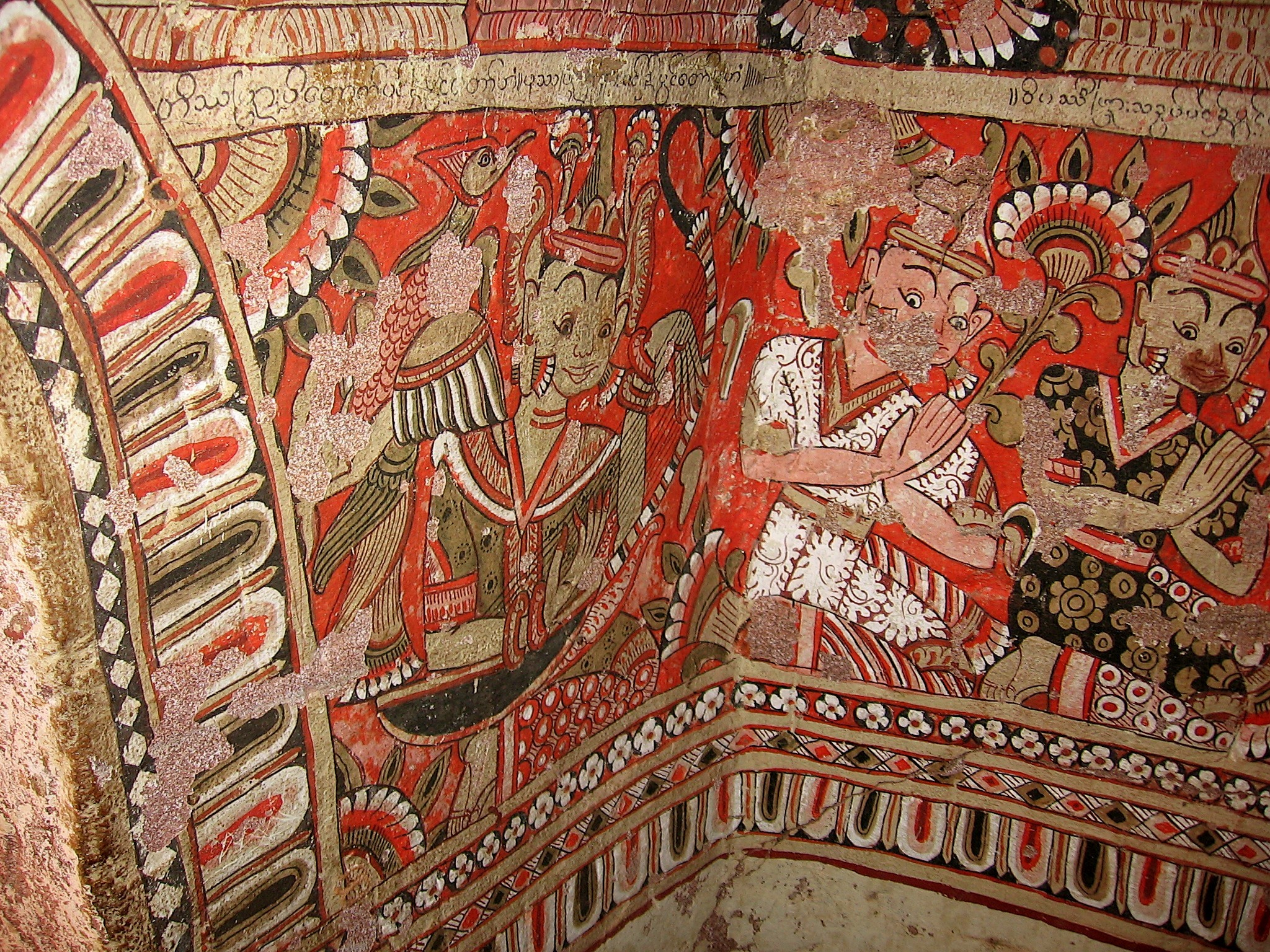
Mural paintings

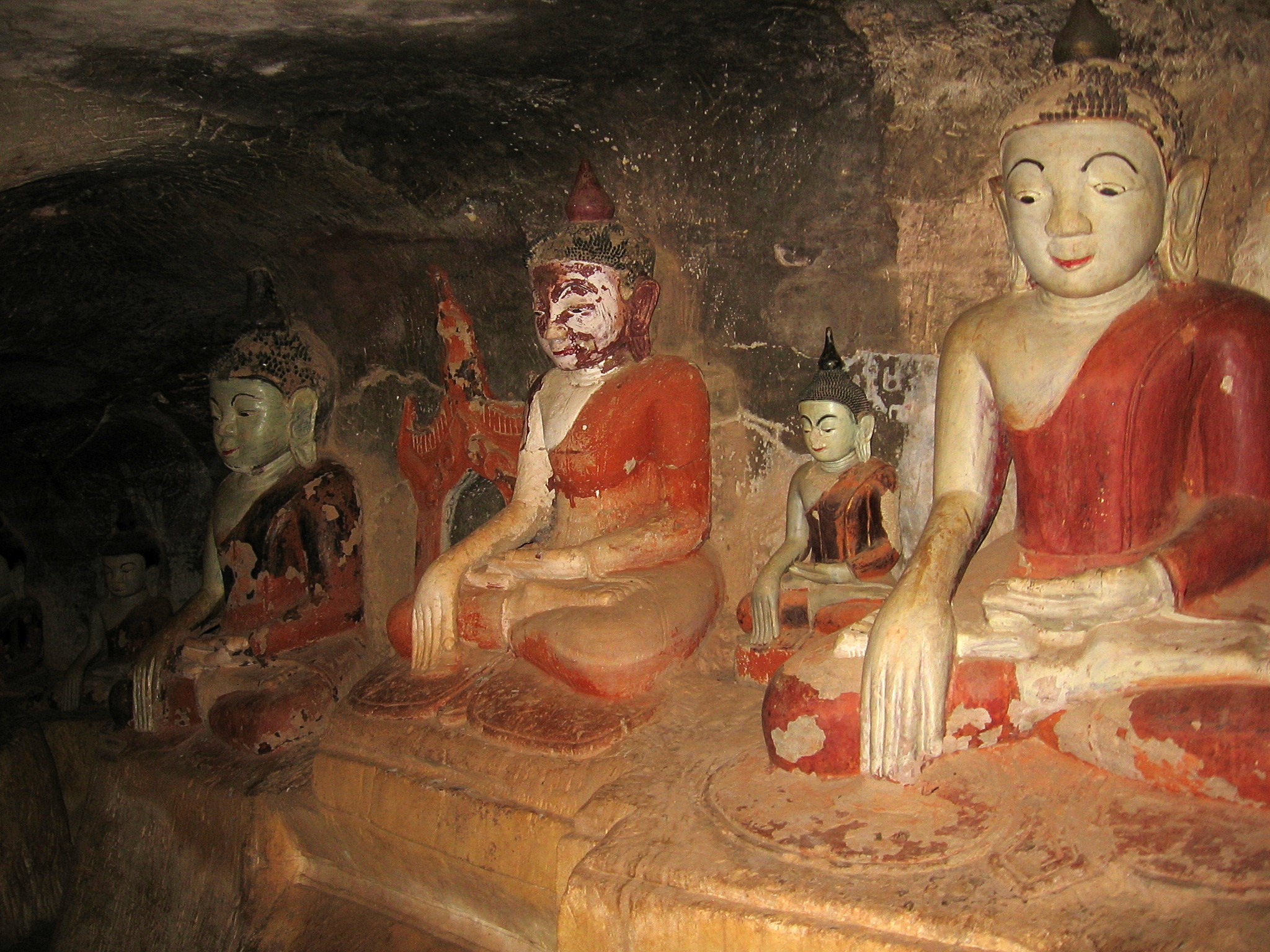
Buddha statues

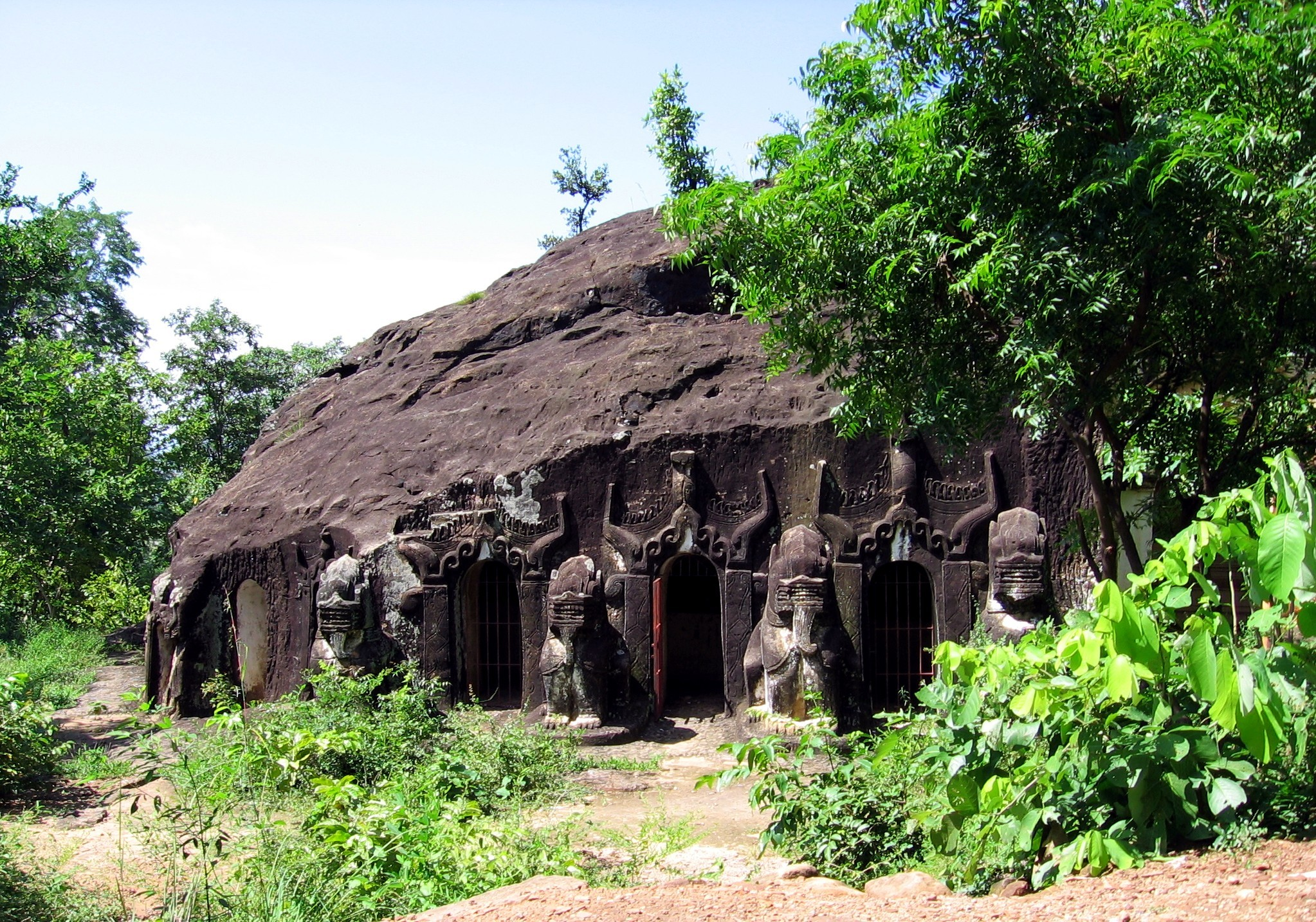
Entrance to one of the caves

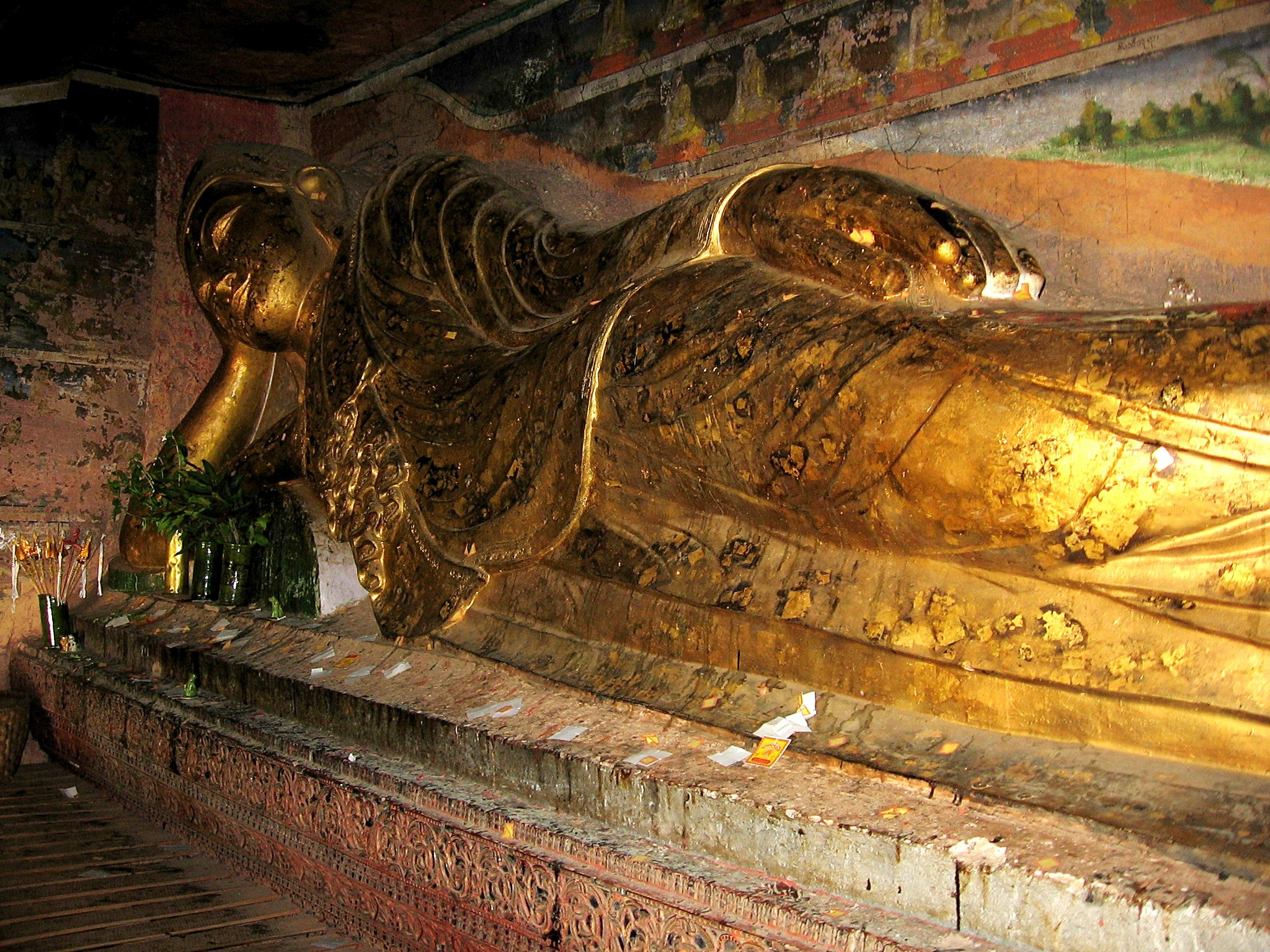
Buddha in Mahaparinibbana pose

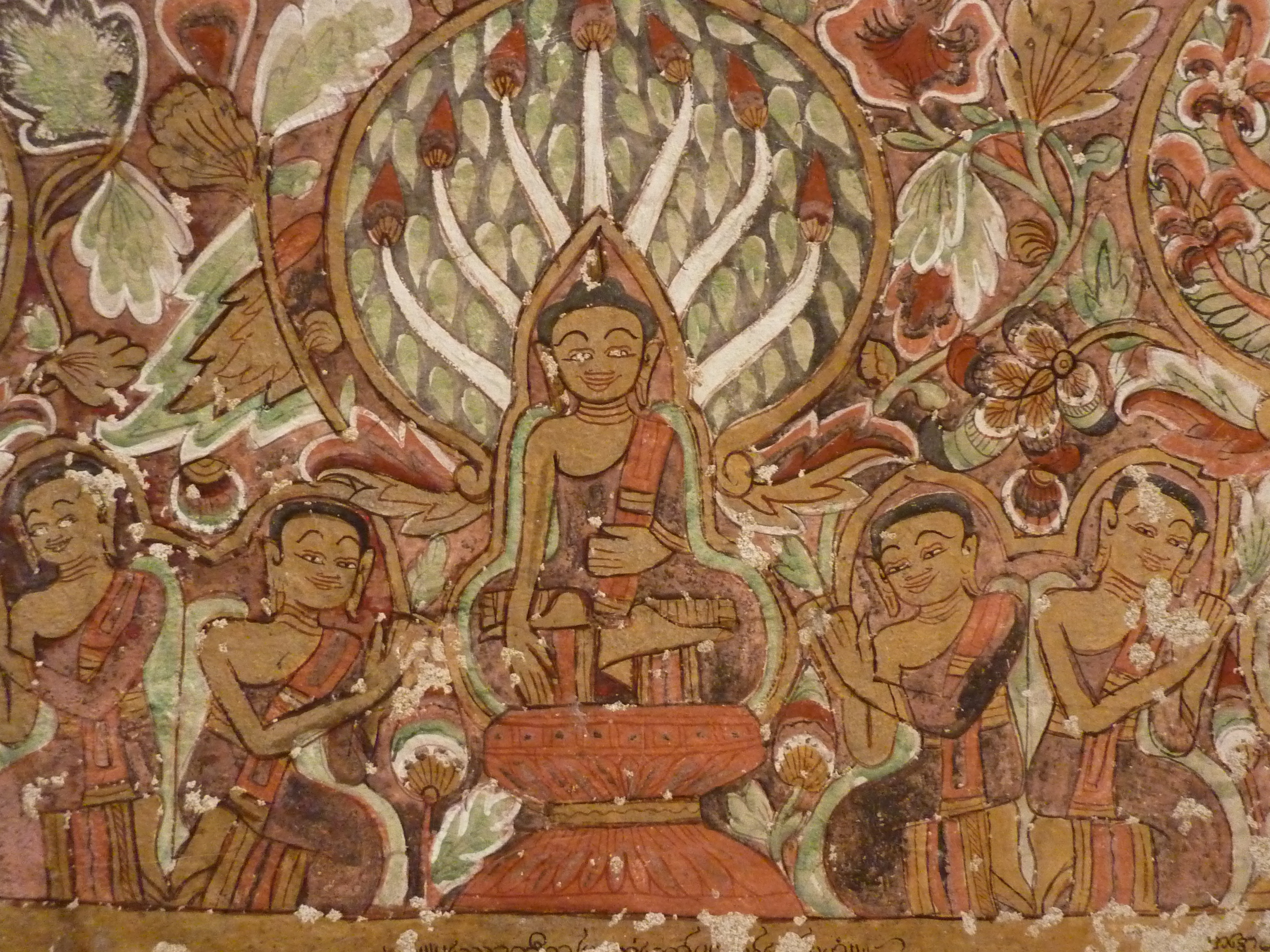
Worshipping the Buddha
