= Chang Mya Mya Thaw =

Burmese author and activist

- ချမ်းမြမြသော်
- Born: 1989 (age 36–37); Mandalay, Myanmar
- Other name: Chanchan (찬찬)
- Education: Mandalay University of Foreign Languages (BA Korean Language, MA English); Kyung Hee University (MA, PhD in Korean Language Education)
- Occupations: Activist, influencer, Korean language instructor
- Years active: 2021–present
- Spouse: Kim Min-soo (m. 2019)
- Children: 1

Chang Mya Mya Thaw, also spelt Chan Mya Mya Thaw (Burmese: ချမ်းမြမြသော်; born 1989) and known in South Korea as Chanchan (Korean: 찬찬), is a Burmese activist, influencer, and Korean language instructor based in South Korea who gained prominence following the 2021 Myanmar coup d'état. She is known for her efforts to bring international attention to the situation in Myanmar through multilingual digital activism.

However, her political reputation declined after she attended an Armed Forces Day event in South Korea, and she was accused alongside Bo Nagar of betraying Myanmar's political movement, with some critics labeling them as traitors.

== Early life ==
Chang Mya Mya Thaw was born in 1989 in Mandalay, Myanmar. She earned a bachelor's degree in Korean Language and a master's degree in English from Mandalay University of Foreign Languages. She later completed a master's degree in Korean Language and a Ph.D. in Korean Language Education at Kyung Hee University. She met her South Korean husband, Kim Min-soo, in 2010 while working as an interpreter for a Korea International Cooperation Agency (KOICA) overseas volunteer program in Myanmar. They later married in 2019 and had a son in 2020.

== Career ==
Before the 2021 coup, she worked as a Korean language instructor. Because she spoke the language fluently and understood Korean culture well, she was featured in South Korean mainstream media and even appeared on TV shows as a foreign participant. After that, she began her broadcasting career with KBS's liberal arts program My Neighbor, Charles. Since then, she has appeared on All the Butlers, International Couple, Korean Foreigner, Marriage Hell, and The Live.

She notably appeared on the popular SBS variety program Master in the House, where she performed alongside well-known Korean actors. Burmese media reported this appearance as a source of national pride.

As a Korean language instructor, she authored textbooks widely used by Myanmar students, including Basic Level 100 Korean Grammar Compilation (အခြေခံအဆင့် ကိုရီးယားသဒ္ဒါ ၁၀၀ ပေါင်းချုပ်) and Intermediate Level Korean Vocabulary (အလယ်တန်းအဆင့် ကိုရီးယားဘာသာ ဝေါဟာရများ).

In 2024, she became the senior vice president of the South Korean-based SDG Group, which specializes in global education, sustainable development, and the promotion of "K-education" abroad.

In January 2026, she was named project manager of a $3.5 million project focused on exporting South Korean agricultural machinery and technology to Southeast Asia. She helped arrange a memorandum of understanding (MOU) between SDG Group and Shinnong Co., Ltd. to begin supplying equipment to Myanmar, the projec's first target market. The initiative also involves working closely with the Myanmar military government to support a smooth rollout for the participating South Korean companies.

In March 2026, Chan Mya Mya Thaw participated as a panelist on the MBN talk show Dongchimi (속풀이쇼 동치미).

On March 28, 2026, she became a member of the SDG University Establishment Promotion Committee, which is developing a "global practical university" in Gimje, Jeonbuk. She is working on an integrated pathway to help international students, mainly from Southeast Asia, study, live, and work in South Korea.

== Activism ==
Following the February 1, 2021 military coup, Chan Mya Mya Thaw became a prominent critic of the military junta while based in South Korea. She used social media to provide real-time updates and commentary on the situation in Myanmar for Korean-speaking audiences. Her videos, delivered in fluent Korean, went viral and contributed to a surge in local solidarity movements. Her advocacy helped mobilize fundraising efforts and public demonstrations involving both the Myanmar diaspora and South Korean citizens. Due to her continuous public advocacy, she was placed on a blacklist by the Myanmar military junta. She was invited to appear on major South Korean television networks, including the KBS current affairs program The Live (더 라이브), to discuss the Spring Revolution and the need for international support.

She donated the 1 million won she received as an appearance fee for Master in the House to a political organization. During the broadcast, she provided detailed testimony regarding the violence in Myanmar, citing figures of over 800 deaths and 5,000 arrests at that time. The episode she appeared in reached a high viewership rating. She was accused of receiving 10 million won for her "Speak Out" activism on Korean TV programs. She denied this, saying her appearances and activism in South Korea were because she wanted to help her country, not for money.

In June 2021, on the eve of detained State Counselor Aung San Suu Kyi's birthday, she delivered a public address specifically directed at the youth of Myanmar, urging them to remain resilient in their pro-democracy efforts.

In May 2023, she appeared on the MBC television program Oh Eun-young's Report (오은영 리포트). During the program, she revealed that she suffered from severe psychological distress, including insomnia and anxiety. She described having nightmares about home invasions and constant fear that the military might arrest or harm her parents in Myanmar. She also said that the pressure from her activism, along with emotional strain in her marriage, led her to attempt suicide during that time.

In June 2025, the military council announced that purchasing or distributing products linked to Chan Mya Mya Thaw and other anti-junta activists abroad would be considered a criminal offense.

On 27 March 2025, her political reputation was tarnished after photos surfaced showing her attending an Armed Forces Day event in South Korea hosted by the Myanmar ambassador. She faced strong criticism, and revolutionary groups called for social punishment against her. She was accused of betraying her activist stance and the Burmese people, becoming a target of the social punishment movement in Myanmar. An activist based in South Korea revealed that information linking Chan Mya Mya Thaw to the military junta had been obtained as early as 2023. Due to her prominence and significant influence within both Myanmar and the Myanmar diaspora in South Korea, activists delayed going public until they had gathered concrete evidence to support their claims.
