= Tun Tun Nyi =

Burmese military officer and spokesperson

His Excellency Major General Tun Tun Nyi
- ထွန်းထွန်းညီ
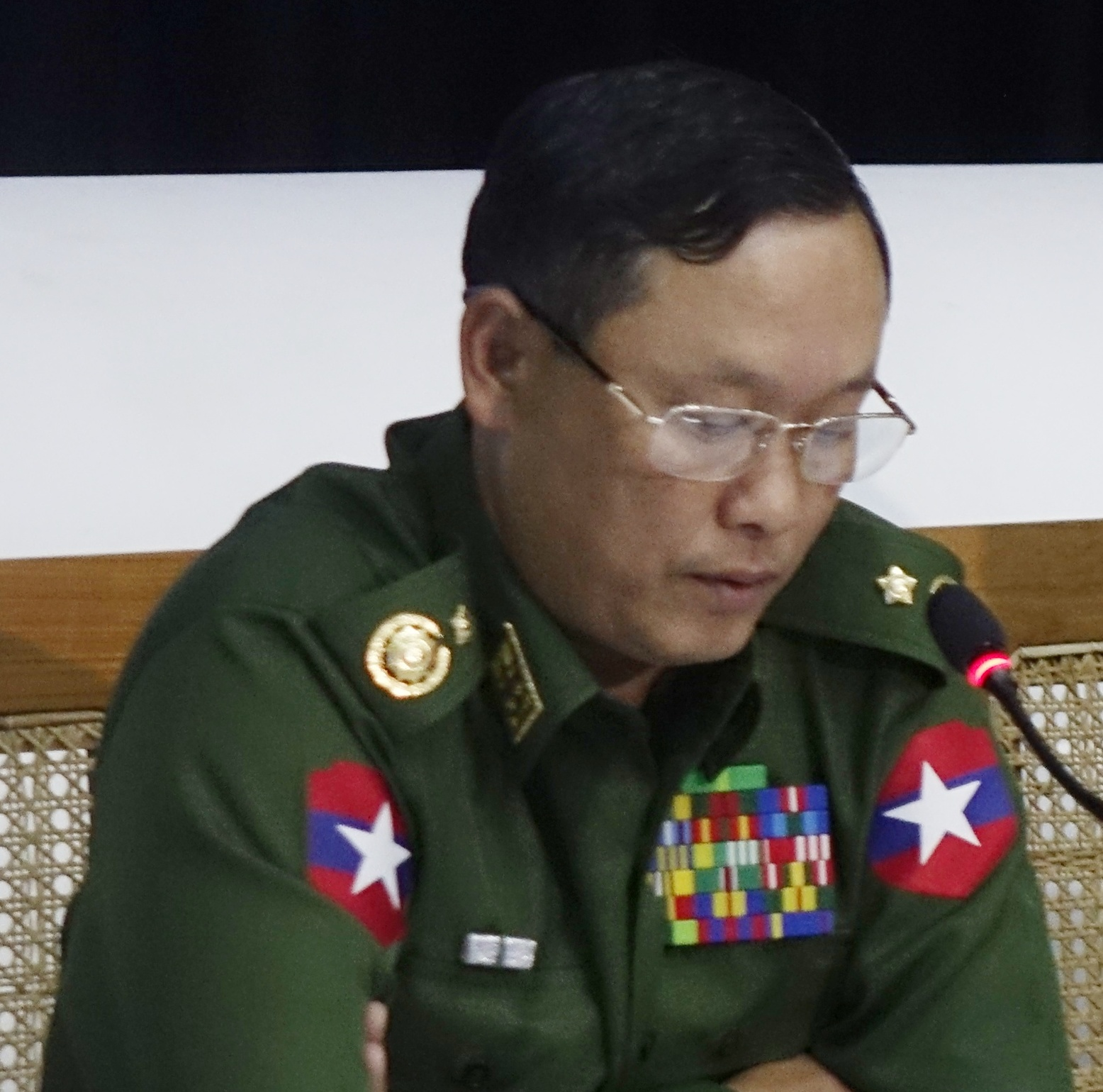
- Tun Tun Nyi during a Tatmadaw True News Information Team press conference in 2019

Vice Chairman of the Tatmadaw True News Information Team
- In office 2018–2021
- Leader: Major General Zaw Min Tun

Military service
- Allegiance: Myanmar
- Branch/service: Myanmar Army
- Rank: Major General

Tun Tun Nyi (Burmese: ထွန်းထွန်းညီ; pronounced [tʰʊ́ɰ̃ tʰʊ́ɰ̃ ɲì]; born Myanmar) is a Burmese military officer who served as the vice chairman of the Tatmadaw True News Information Team, the official media and public relations arm of the Tatmadaw (Myanmar military). He was known for being a public spokesperson for the military during major political events, including the 2021 military coup.

== Early life and education ==
Details about Tun Tun Nyi's early life and education are not publicly available. It is presumed he attended the Defence Services Academy of Myanmar, like most senior officers in the Tatmadaw.

== Military career ==
Tun Tun Nyi served in the Myanmar Army and rose through the ranks to become a Major General. He was appointed vice chairman of the Tatmadaw True News Information Team around 2018. In this role, he frequently appeared at military press conferences and briefings to provide official narratives regarding military operations, civil unrest, and political developments.

== Role in the Tatmadaw True News Information Team ==
As vice chairman of the Tatmadaw True News Information Team, Tun Tun Nyi was tasked with defending the military’s stance in the face of international scrutiny, especially after the 2017 Rohingya crackdown and the February 2021 coup d'état. Alongside spokesman Major General Zaw Min Tun, he regularly addressed the media until the team became less active following the coup.

== Personal life ==
Little is publicly known about Tun Tun Nyi's personal life, including his family or non-military affiliations.

== See also ==
- Tatmadaw True News Information Team
- Chief of the Tatmadaw True News Information Team
- Deputy Minister of Information (Myanmar)
- Director of Public Relations and Psychological Warfare of the Myanmar Army
- Zaw Min Tun
- Myanmar Army
- Tatmadaw
- Soe Naing Oo
- Nationwide Ceasefire Agreement
