= Soe Naing Oo =

Burmese army officer

His Excellency Major General Soe Naing Oo
- စိုးနိုင်ဦး
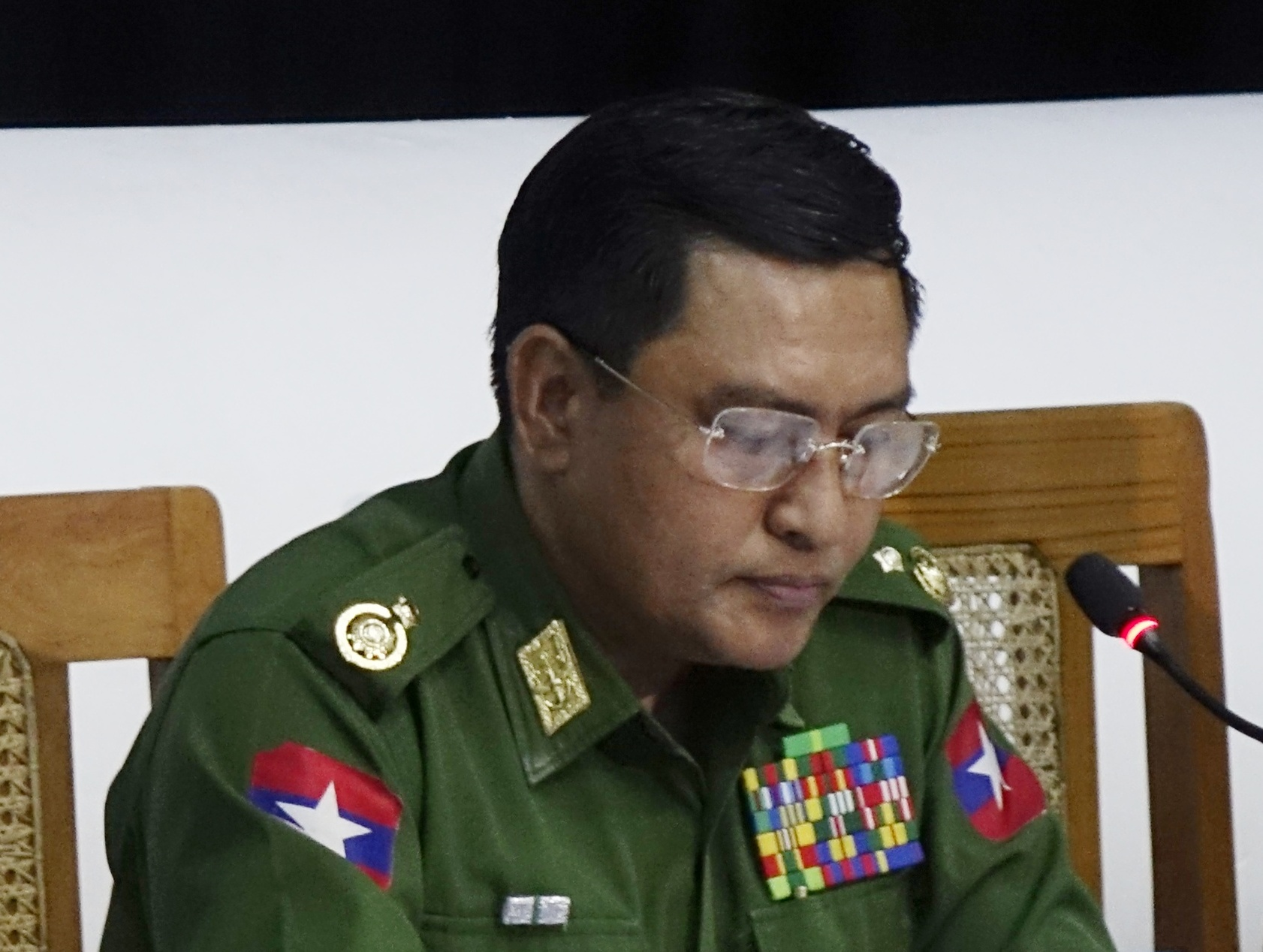
- Soe Naing Oo at a Tatmadaw True News Information Team press conference in January 2019

Chief of the Tatmadaw True News Information Team
- In office 2018 – February 2021
- Succeeded by: Major General Zaw Min Tun

Personal details
- Born: Myanmar (Burma)

Military service
- Allegiance: Myanmar
- Branch/service: Myanmar Army
- Years of service: 1980s–2021
- Rank: Major General
- Commands: Chief of the Tatmadaw True News Information Team
- Battles/wars: Internal conflicts in Myanmar

Soe Naing Oo (Burmese: စိုးနိုင်ဦး; pronounced [sʰoʊ̯ naɪ̯ɰ̥ ʔú]; born Myanmar) is a senior Burmese army officer in the Myanmar Armed Forces (Tatmadaw), known for his role as the former Chairman of the Tatmadaw True News Information Team. He has been actively involved in military communications and peace negotiations with ethnic armed organizations (EAOs) in Myanmar.

== Early life and education ==
Soe Naing Oo was born in Myanmar (Burma). Specific details about his early life and educational background are not publicly available.

== Military career ==
Soe Naing Oo served as the Chairman of the Tatmadaw True News Information Team, the official public relations unit of the Myanmar Armed Forces. In this role, he was responsible for disseminating military statements, countering allegations, and managing the military’s communication with the media and the public.

He played a significant role in promoting the Nationwide Ceasefire Agreement (NCA), urging all ethnic armed organizations to commit to the peace process with conviction.

In a 2019 press conference, he emphasized the Tatmadaw's readiness for peace talks but also its preparedness for military action if necessary.

Following the 2021 military coup in Myanmar, the Tatmadaw True News Information Team became inactive, and its functions were absorbed into the State Administration Council's broader information operations.

== Personal life ==
Information regarding Soe Naing Oo's personal life, including his family and background, is not publicly disclosed.

== See also ==
- Tatmadaw True News Information Team
- Chief of the Tatmadaw True News Information Team
- Tun Tun Nyi
- Director of Public Relations and Psychological Warfare of the Myanmar Army
- Deputy Minister of Information (Myanmar)
- Nationwide Ceasefire Agreement
- Myanmar Army
- Tatmadaw
- Zaw Min Tun
