= Alaungdaw Kathapa National Park =

National park in Myanmar

- IUCN category II (national park)
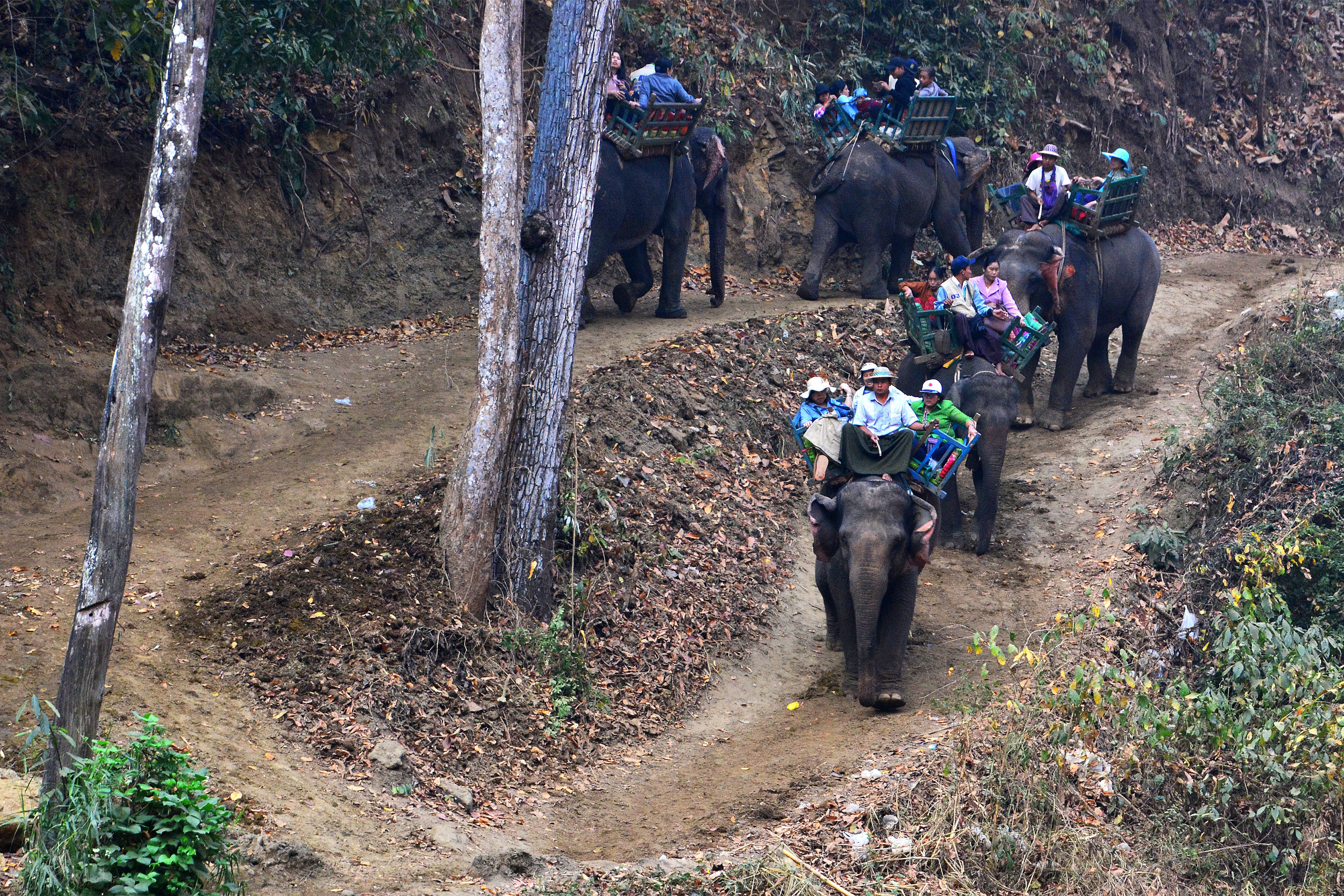

- Location within Myanmar
- Location: Kani and Mingin Townships, Sagaing Division, Myanmar
- Coordinates: 22°23′N 94°25′E
- Area: 541.6 mi^{2} (1,403 km^{2})
- Established: 21 July 1893 as Patolon Reserved Forest, 1941 as Alaungdaw Kathapa Wild Life Reserve
- Governing body: Nature and Wildlife Conservation Division

Alaungdaw Kathapa National Park is a national park in Myanmar covering 541.6 mi^{2} (1,403 km^{2}). It was established in 1989 and is listed as one of the ASEAN Heritage Parks. It spans an elevation of 443–4,380 ft (135–1,335 m) in the Kani and Mingin Townships in Sagaing Region.

== History ==
In 1893, this mountainous area between the Chindwin and Myittha Rivers was declared a reserved forest and selectively logged for teak. It was little disturbed when surveyors of the Food and Agriculture Organization and the United Nations Development Programme visited it in the early 1980s, who were invited by the Government of Myanmar to assist in identifying suitable areas for national parks and nature reserves. In 1984, they proposed to establish a tract of 1,606 km^{2} (620 sq mi) as Alaungdaw Kathapa National Park. Its name honours a legendary monk who lived there in historical times. The national park was gazetted in 1989 and demarcated with an area of 617 km^{2} (238 sq mi). Its actual area reported by Myanmar's Ministry of Natural Resources and Environmental Conservation is 541.6 km^{2} (209.1 sq mi).

== Biodiversity ==
Alaungdaw Kathapa National Park harbours foremost mixed deciduous forest, evergreen forest and pine forest with 165 tree species and 39 species of medicinal plants.

Asian elephant (Elephas maximus), gaur (Bos gaurus), Himalayan black bear (Ursus thibetanus), sun bear (Helarctos malayanus), dhole (Cuon alpinus), sambar deer (Cervus unicolor), Indian muntjac (Muntiacus muntjak), wild boar (Sus scrofa), Indian crested porcupine (Hystrix indica) and black giant squirrel (Ratufa bicolor) were sighted during a transect survey in January 1999. The elephant population was estimated at between two and 41 individuals in 2003, based on dung surveys conducted over three years. Wildlife recorded during a camera trap survey in 1999 comprised yellow-throated marten (Martes flavigula), Asian palm civet (Paradoxurus hermaphroditus), large Indian civet (Viverra zibetha), small Indian civet (Viverricula indica), hog badger (Arctonyx collaris), crab-eating mongoose (Herpestes urva), leopard (Panthera pardus), Asiatic golden cat (Catopuma temminckii) and leopard cat (Prionailurus bengalensis).

In 2000, the bent-toed gecko Cyrtodactylus annandalei was discovered in the national park and described as a new species in 2003. It is sympatric with Cyrtodactylus slowinskii. Oriental leaf-toed gecko (Hemidactylus bowringii), Brooke's house gecko (H. brookii), common house gecko (H. frenatus), Indo-Pacific gecko (H. garnotii) and flat-tailed house gecko (H. platyurus) also live in the national park.
