= Cyrtodactylus consobrinoides =

Scientific classification
- Domain: Eukaryota
- Kingdom: Animalia
- Phylum: Chordata
- Class: Reptilia
- Order: Squamata
- Infraorder: Gekkota
- Family: Gekkonidae
- Genus: Cyrtodactylus
- Species: C. consobrinoides

Binomial name
- Cyrtodactylus consobrinoides (Annandale, 1905)

Synonyms
- Gymnodactylus consobrinoides

Species of lizard

Cyrtodactylus consobrinoides is a species of gecko that is endemic to southern Myanmar.
