= Zaw Min Tun =

Zaw Min Tun may refer to:

- Zaw Min Tun (general), Burmese army general and military spokesperson
- Zaw Min Tun (footballer) (born 1992), Burmese footballer
