= Fake news in Pakistan =

The issue of Fake News in Pakistan has become an increasing issue in the 21st century, especially within the realm of social media. The President of Pakistan, Arif Alvi, has penned an editorial for The News specifically condemning the plague of falsehoods that permeate the media and how it "created a deep sense of surprise and resentment in a population suffering from inflation and poverty".

According to the Indian fact-checking network, Alt News, pro-Pakistan disinformation networks started to spread stories about the Myanmar-based Kachin Independence Army and India signing a contract for rare earth extraction in December 2025 via purported entrepreneurial websites. These stories were eventually republished on pro-Myanmar military media networks such as NP News and Eleven Media Group and Northeast Indian websites.
