= Pale, Myanmar =

Pale Palè
- Town
- Location in Myanmar
- Coordinates: 21°56′04″N 94°52′28″E
- Country: Myanmar
- Region: Sagaing Region
- District: Yinmabin District
- Township: Pale Township
- Elevation: 126 m (413 ft)
- Time zone: UTC+6.30 (MST)

Pale (Burmese: ပုလဲ) is a town in Pale Township, Yinmabin District, in southern Sagaing Region, Myanmar. It is the administrative seat of Pale Township. Pale is at a crossroads with one route going north to Yinmabin, one running west to Mindaingbin, and a third running south-east to Kyadet.
