= Kani, Myanmar =

Kani ကနီ
- Town
- Location in Myanmar
- Coordinates: 22°43′20″N 94°12′28″E
- Country: Myanmar
- Region: Sagaing Region
- District: Yinmabin District
- Township: Kani Township

Area
  - Total: 2.45 sq mi (6.3 km^{2})

Population (2019)
  - Total: 5,180
- Time zone: UTC+6.30 (MMT)

Kani (Burmese: ကနီမြို့) is a town in Sagaing Region, Myanmar. It is situated on the west bank of Chindwin river. It is 104 miles (167 km) away from Pakokku.

There is Shwe Myin Phyu Hill at the north. That hill was a city ago and so the remains of moats and castle area wall. Myin Phyu Shin Divinity which is famous in Myanmar now is Kani Nawyahtār who was the city governor of Kani when King Ah Nawyahtār governed the country. The mayor of Kani was the General of Shield army, who was father of Dye Khin Khin, at the age of King Si Paw. According to census at 1951, population of the town was just 2,500 people.

== Distinction ==
The Kani town is famous with the name of Kani-Kané. A Great Buddhist Monk Kani Shwe Thein Taw Sayadaw was from Kamphyu at the township of Kani.
