= Black Leopard Army =

Ethnic armed organisation in Myanmar

- ကျားသစ်နက် တပ်မတော်
- Leader: Ko Ukkar
- Dates active: 23 October 2021 – present
- Headquarters: Yinmabin District
- Active regions: Sagaing Region
- Size: ~700
- Website: Black Leopard Army on Facebook

The Black Leopard Army (Burmese: ကျားသစ်နက် တပ်မတော်; abbr. BLA) is an ethnic armed organisation based in Sagaing Region.The BLA was founded on 23 October 2021, with nearly 700 members. According to Midland Voice, Over the past two years, the BLA participated in 78 clashes, killed 155 Tatmadaw soldiers, with 13 BLA soldiers killed and 6 injured.

== See also ==
- Operation 1027
