= Cyrtodactylus annandalei =

Conservation status
- Least Concern (IUCN 3.1)

Scientific classification
- Kingdom: Animalia
- Phylum: Chordata
- Class: Reptilia
- Order: Squamata
- Suborder: Gekkota
- Family: Gekkonidae
- Genus: Cyrtodactylus
- Species: C. annandalei

Binomial name
- Cyrtodactylus annandalei Bauer, 2003
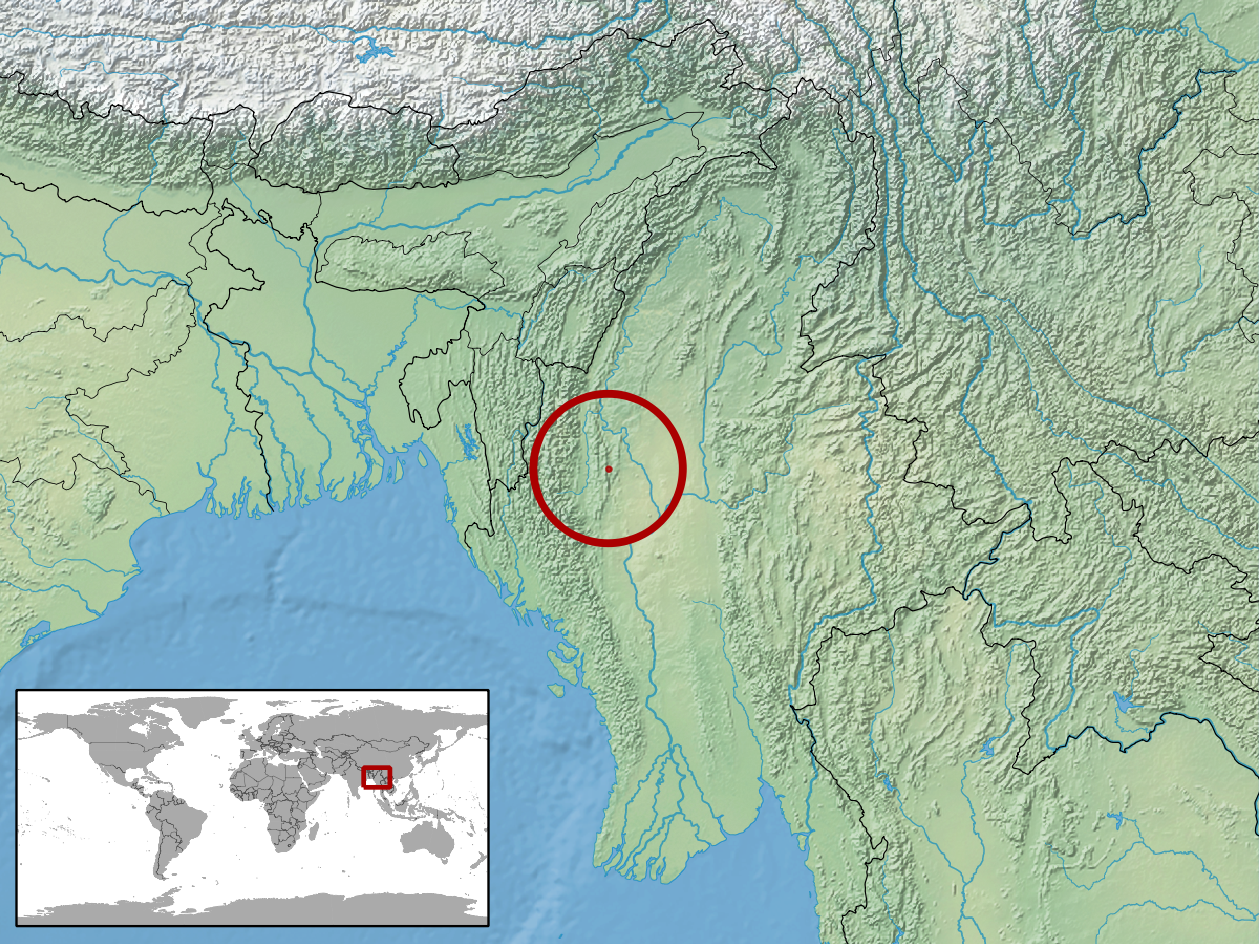

Species of lizard

Cyrtodactylus annandalei is a species of bent-toed gecko, a lizard in the family Gekkonidae. The species is endemic to Myanmar.

== Etymology ==
The specific name, annandalei, is in honor of Scottish zoologist Nelson Annandale.

== Taxonomy ==
C. annandalei was discovered in 2000 in Myanmar's Alaungdaw Kathapa National Park and described in 2003. It is sympatric with Cyrtodactylus slowinskii.

== Habitat ==
The preferred natural habitat of C. annandalei is forest.

== Description ==
Small for its genus, C. annandalei may attain a snout-to-vent length (SVL) of about 5 cm (2.0 in).

== Reproduction ==
C. annandalei is oviparous.

== Conservation status ==
Since 2018, C. annandalei is listed as Least Concern on the IUCN Red List.
