= Bo Nagar =

Former Burmese revolutionary leader

- ဗိုလ်နဂါး
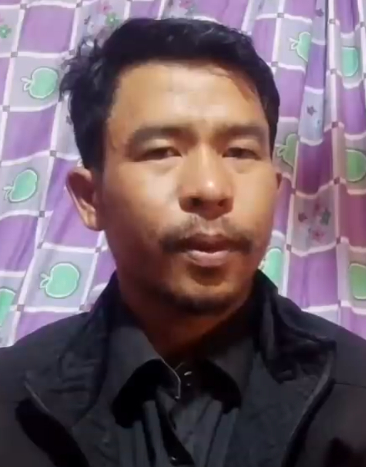
- Bo Nagar in 2022
- Born: Sagaing Region, Myanmar
- Military career
- Service years: 2021–2026
- Rank: Commander
- Units: Myanmar Royal Dragon Army (2022–2023); Burma National Revolutionary Army (2023–2026)
- Commands: Burma National Revolutionary Army
- Conflicts: Myanmar civil war

Bo Nagar (Burmese: ဗိုလ်နဂါး) is a former Burmese revolutionary and the commander of the Myanmar Royal Dragon Army (MRDA). He was a prominent figure during the Spring Revolution and most recent stage of the Myanmar Civil War before he surrendered to the military in February 2026.

== Revolution ==
He commanded the Pale People's Defence Force, which has been inflicted on military troops in 2021. Amid rising resistance in Sagaing Region, he has risen in prominence and the junta has attempted to capture him. He has commanded the MRDA, which is under the NUG's command, since its formation in January, 2022. Under his leadership, 180 soldiers have killed in ambushes. As retaliation, the military troops raided a village for searching Bo Nagar, killed 20 people, and his cousin was beheaded. In January 2022, the military council used four helicopters to capture Bo Nagar, but did not succeed. On 9 September 2023, Bo Nagar founded the Burma National Revolutionary Army (BNRA) and assumed the role of its chairman.

In early January 2026, NUG defense forces removed four toll gates/checkpoints operated by the BNRA in Pale Township. Following these incidents, Bo Nagar accused the NUG of initiating attacks against his group. On January 9, 2026, he stated that if attacked, he would regard the NUG as a hostile force and retaliate in self-defense.

There had been tensions between Bo Nagar's force and the NUG PDF units since last year. These tensions reportedly reached a boiling point last week when, by its own admission, the BNRA fatally shot a PDF fighter in a dispute over a weapon. On Tuesday, the PDF retaliated by raiding positions held by the BNRA.

On 18 February 2026, Bo Nagar surrendered and collaborated with the military. According to multiple reports, Bo Nagar was extracted from his operational area by a military helicopter.

== Controversies ==
Bo Nagar claimed that the establishment of the Burma National Revolutionary Army (BNRA) was discussed online with the NUG interim president, Duwa Lashi La, and NUG Defense Minister Yee Mon. The President's Office issued a statement asserting that the matters discussed during the Defense Minister's conversation with Bo Nagar did not include any content related to the formation of the BNRA.

Bo Nagar claimed the BNRA was established in collaboration with local people's defense forces that do not operate under the NUG's Chain of Command (COC), including MRDA battalions. He emphasized that the formation of the BNRA is not meant to create a separate faction and that they intend to work in cooperation with the NUG.

In an 18 October 2026 video shared by pro-Tatmadaw networks such as NP News, Bo Nagar condemned the Spring Revolution as an "eternal political game " for the self-interest of EAOs and the NUG. He further stated that he would restart fighting against anti-Tatmadaw forces.
