= Monywa District =

Monywa District မုံရွာခရိုင်
- District
- Coordinates: 22°07′N 95°08′E
- Country: Myanmar
- Region: Sagaing Region
- No. of Townships: 4
- Capital: Monywa
- Time zone: UTC+6.30 (MMT)

Monywa District (Burmese: မုံရွာခရိုင်) (formerly Lower Chindwin District) is an administrative district in southern Sagaing Division, Burma (Myanmar). Its administrative center is the city of Monywa.

== Administrative divisions ==
Townships of Monywa District

Monywa District consists of the following townships:

Monywa Township
Ayadaw Township
Budalin Township
Chaung-U Township

Monywa District previously also consisted of the following townships, which became Yinmabin District:

- Kani Township
- Pale Township
- Salingyi Township
- Yinmabin Township

Also, it had a township that was annexed to Shwebo District- Tabayin Township.

== Borders ==
Monywa District is bordered by:

- Mawlaik District to the north,
- Yinmabin District to the west,
- Sagaing District to the south

== Notable residents ==
- Aung Khin, Burmese painter
