= Nelson Annandale =

British-born scientist

Nelson Annandale CIE FRSE
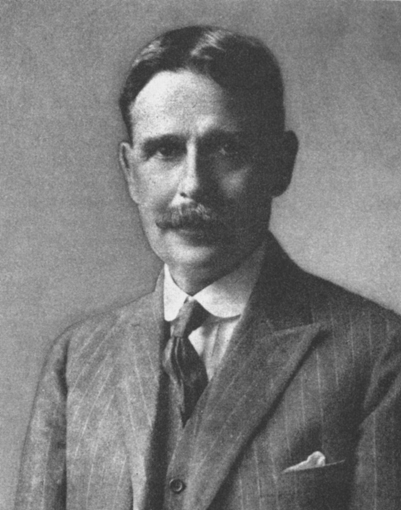
- Born: 15 June 1876; Edinburgh, Great Britain
- Died: 10 April 1924 (aged 47); Calcutta, India
- Education: University of Edinburgh

Thomas Nelson Annandale CIE FRSE (15 June 1876, in Edinburgh – 10 April 1924, in Calcutta) was a British zoologist, entomologist, anthropologist, and herpetologist. He was the founding director of the Zoological Survey of India.

== Life ==
The eldest son of Thomas Annandale, the regius professor of clinical surgery at the University of Edinburgh. His maternal grandfather was a publisher, William Nelson. Thomas was educated at Rugby School, Balliol College, Oxford where he studied under Ray Lankester and E. B. Tylor (doing better in anthropology than zoology), and at the University of Edinburgh where he studied anthropology, receiving a D.Sc. (1905). As a student he made visits to Iceland and the Faeroe Islands. In 1899 he travelled with Herbert C. Robinson as part of the Skeat Expedition to the northern part of the Malay Peninsula. Annandale went to India in 1904 as Deputy Superintendent under A.W. Alcock of the Natural History Section of the Indian Museum. He was a deputy director at the Indian Museum in Calcutta and in 1907 he succeeded Alcock to become its director.

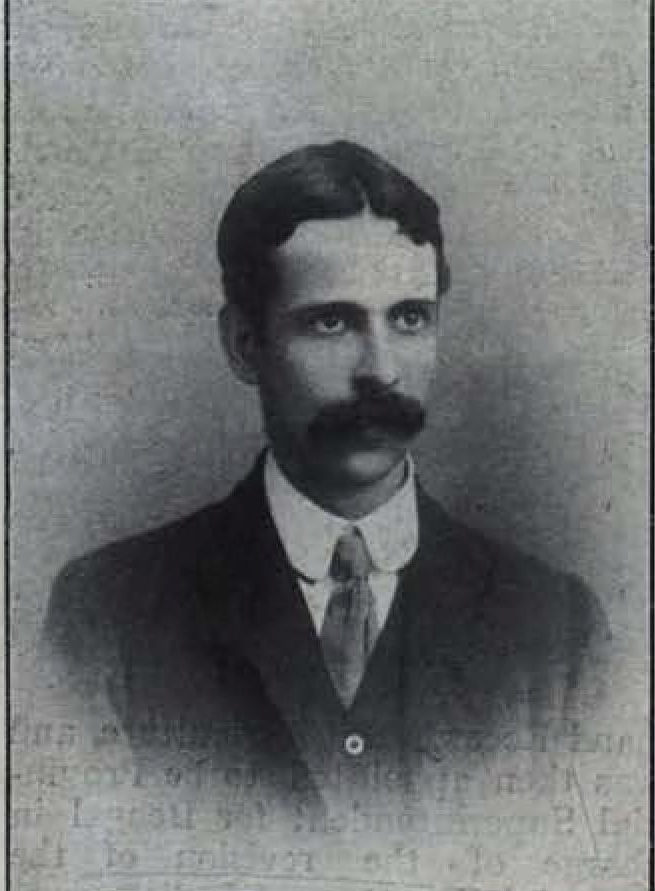
c. 1907

He started the Records and Memoirs of the Indian Museum journals and in 1916, he became the first director of the Zoological Survey of India that he helped found. He was associated with many scientists of his time. This change placed an official equality with botany and geology and made more funds available for expeditions to various parts of India. He was interested in aspects beyond systematics including ecology. His suggestion of a problem in anthropology to P. C. Mahalanobis led to the latter's discovery of a technique that developed into the multivariate statistical techniques of today. He held the position of director until 1924 and was succeeded by Robert Beresford Seymour Sewell (1880–1964). He was president of the 1924 session of the Indian Science Congress. The Royal Asiatic Society of Bengal, with which he was closely associated during his service in India as Anthropological Secretary, Vice-President and as its President in 1923 instituted a triennial an Annandale Memorial Medal for contributions to anthropology in Asia. The first award was made to Dr Fritz Sarasin in 1928.

In 1921, as his father had been, he was elected a Fellow of the Royal Society of Edinburgh. He attended a party to celebrate his election shortly after an ulcer of the duodenum was noted. He also had a relapse of malaria and died shortly after at the age of 47. He was buried at the South Park Street Cemetery, but later his remains were moved to the Scottish Cemetery, Park Circus, Kolkata.

His insect and spider collection is in the Indian Museum, Calcutta.

He was also noted for his work on the biology and anthropology of the Faroe Islands and Iceland about which he published The Faeroes and Iceland: a Study in Island Life in 1905.

Working in the scientific field of herpetology, he described several new species of lizards. He is commemorated in the scientific names of three species of reptiles: Cyrtodactylus annandalei, Heosemys annandalii, and Kolpophis annandalei.

== Bibliography ==
A partial list includes [for a complete list, see ZSI (2010)]:

- Annandale N, Robinson HC (1903). Fasciculi Malayenses: Anthropological and Zoological Results of an Expedition to Perak and the Siamese Malay States. Liverpool.
- Annandale N (1905).The Faroes and Iceland: studies in island life. Oxford:Clarendon Press.
- Annandale N, Gravely FH (1914). "The limestone caves of Burma and the Malay Peninsula, Part II: The fauna of the caves". Journal and Proceedings of the Asiatic Society of Bengal (ns) 9 (10) for 1913: 402–423.
- Annandale N, Prashad B, Amin-ud-Din (1921). "The Aquatic and Amphibious Molluscs of Manipur". Records of the Indian Museum 22 (4): 528–632.
- Annandale, N. & H.S. Rao. 1925. Materials for a revision of the recent Indian Limnaeidae (Mollusca Pulmonata). Records of the Indian Museum 27(3):137-189.

== See also ==
- Category:Taxa named by Nelson Annandale
