= Deputy Minister of Information (Myanmar) =

Deputy Minister of Information of Myanmar

Deputy Minister of Information of Myanmar
- ပြန်ကြားရေးမြန်မာနိုင်ငံဒုဝန်ကြီး
- State seal of Myanmar

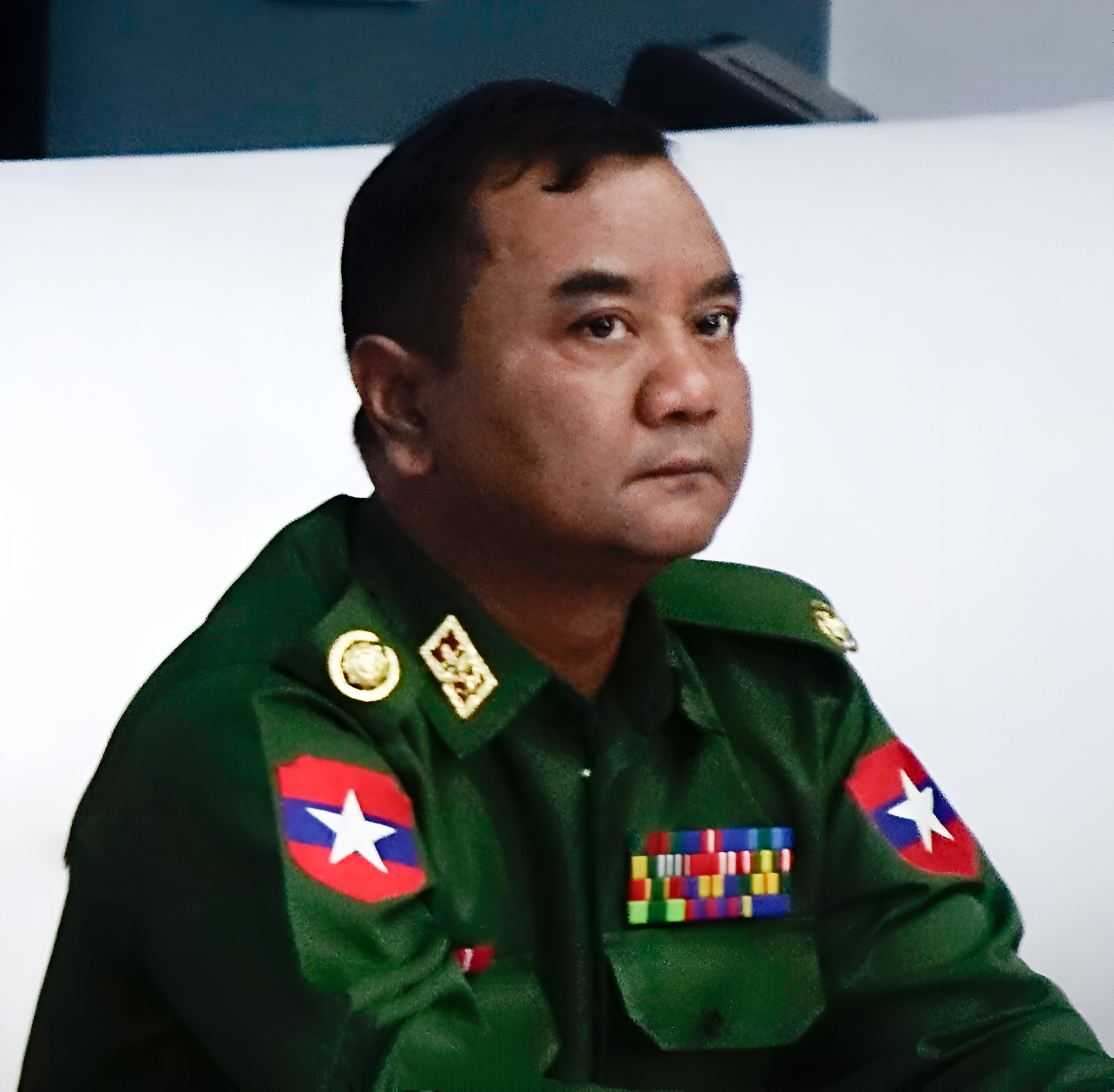
- Incumbent; Zaw Min Tun since 7 February 2021
- Ministry of Information
- Type: Deputy Minister
- Seat: Naypyidaw, Myanmar
- Appointer: State Administration Council
- Term length: No fixed term
- Website: moi.gov.mm

The Deputy Minister of Information (Burmese: ပြန်ကြားရေးဒုဝန်ကြီး) is a senior government official in Myanmar, responsible for assisting the Minister of Information in overseeing the country's media and information policies. This role involves managing the dissemination of government information, handling state media, and ensuring the government's perspective is conveyed through various media channels. The position has no fixed term, and deputy ministers are appointed at the discretion of the ruling government or military authorities.

== Role and responsibilities ==
The Deputy Minister of Information plays a key role in assisting the Minister of Information in the overall management of information policy and strategy. The Deputy Minister also oversees state-run media organizations, coordinates the release of government communications, and manages the distribution of information to the public. Additionally, the Deputy Minister is responsible for enforcing regulations related to media content and reporting, collaborating with other governmental departments on national information campaigns, and representing the Ministry of Information in meetings or official functions as delegated by the Minister.

== Notable officeholders ==
- Zaw Min Tun (2021–2026)

== Recent activities ==
In recent years, the Deputy Minister of Information's office has been involved in the dissemination of government messages and information regarding national policies. During periods of political upheaval and military control, the role has also been central to managing the state's narrative in the media, particularly in relation to the 2021 coup and subsequent civil unrest.

== See also ==
- Ministry of Information (Myanmar)
- Zaw Min Tun (general)
- Media in Myanmar
- Myanmar Army
- Tatmadaw
- Tatmadaw True News Information Team
