= NP News =

Independent news media organization in Myanmar

- Company type: Private
- Industry: News media
- Founded: 2021
- Founder: Kyaw Myo Min
- Headquarters: Myanmar
- Website: npnewsmm.com

NP News (Burmese: အန်ပီနျူးစ်, IPA: [ʔàɰ̃ pì ɲjúʔ]) is a Myanmar-based news agency established in 2021 by journalist and media entrepreneur Kyaw Myo Min. The agency operates in Burmese, English, and Chinese languages, providing news coverage on various platforms, including a dedicated website and social media channels. The media is one of the few pro-military media outlets allowed to attend the military's press conferences.

== History ==
Following the military coup in Myanmar in 2021, Kyaw Myo Min founded NP News to offer an alternative perspective in the country's media landscape. The agency has been noted for its coverage that aligns with the military regime's viewpoints, often referring to opposition groups such as the National Unity Government (NUG) and the People's Defense Forces (PDF) as "terrorists" in its reports.

== Operations ==
NP News maintains a strong digital presence, disseminating news through its website and actively engaging audiences on platforms such as YouTube, TikTok, and Twitter. The agency produces a variety of content, including video reports and interviews, catering to a diverse audience base.

== Controversies ==
The agency has faced criticism from pro-democracy groups and independent journalists who argue that its reporting supports the military junta's objectives and undermines opposition movements. Despite these criticisms, NP News continues to operate within Myanmar, whereas many independent media outlets have been forced into exile or have ceased operations due to the political climate.
