= Cyrtodactylus slowinskii =

Conservation status
- Least Concern (IUCN 3.1)

Scientific classification
- Kingdom: Animalia
- Phylum: Chordata
- Class: Reptilia
- Order: Squamata
- Suborder: Gekkota
- Family: Gekkonidae
- Genus: Cyrtodactylus
- Species: C. slowinskii

Binomial name
- Cyrtodactylus slowinskii Bauer, 2002

Species of lizard

Cyrtodactylus slowinskii, known commonly as Slowinski's gecko, is a species of lizard in the family Gekkonidae. The species is endemic to Myanmar.

== Etymology ==
The specific name, slowinskii, is in honor of American herpetologist Joseph Bruno Slowinski.

== Habitat ==
The preferred natural habitat of C. slowinskii is forest.

== Reproduction ==
C. slowinskii is oviparous.
