= Yinmabin Township =

- Township
- Location in Yinmabin district

- Location in Sagaing region

- Location in Myanmar
- Coordinates: 22°5′N 94°54′E
- Country: Myanmar
- Region: Sagaing Region
- District: Yinmabin District
- Capital: Yinmabin
- Time zone: UTC+6.30 (MST)

Yinmabin Township is a township in Yinmabin District in the Sagaing Division of Myanmar. The principal town is Yinmabin.

Notably, 10 kilometers (6.2 mi) southeast of Yinmabin, is the Phowintaung Buddhist cave complex.
