= Salingyi Township =

- Township
- Location in Yinmabin district

- Location in Sagaing region

- Location in Myanmar
- Coordinates: 21°58′N 95°5′E
- Country: Myanmar
- Region: Sagaing Region
- District: Yinmabin District
- Capital: Salingyi
- Time zone: UTC+6.30 (MST)

Salingyi Township is a township in Yinmabin District in the Sagaing Division of Myanmar. The principal town is Salingyi.

Over 7,800 acres (3,200 ha) of farmland have been confiscated in the township to establish a copper mine in Letpadaung, which will be jointly owned by the Union of Myanmar Economic Holdings (UMEHL) and the Chinese-owned Wenbao Copper Company, a subsidiary of Norinco.
