= Tatmadaw True News Information Team =

State media of Myanmar

- တပ်မတော်သတင်းမှန်ပြန်ကြား‌ရေးအဖွဲ့
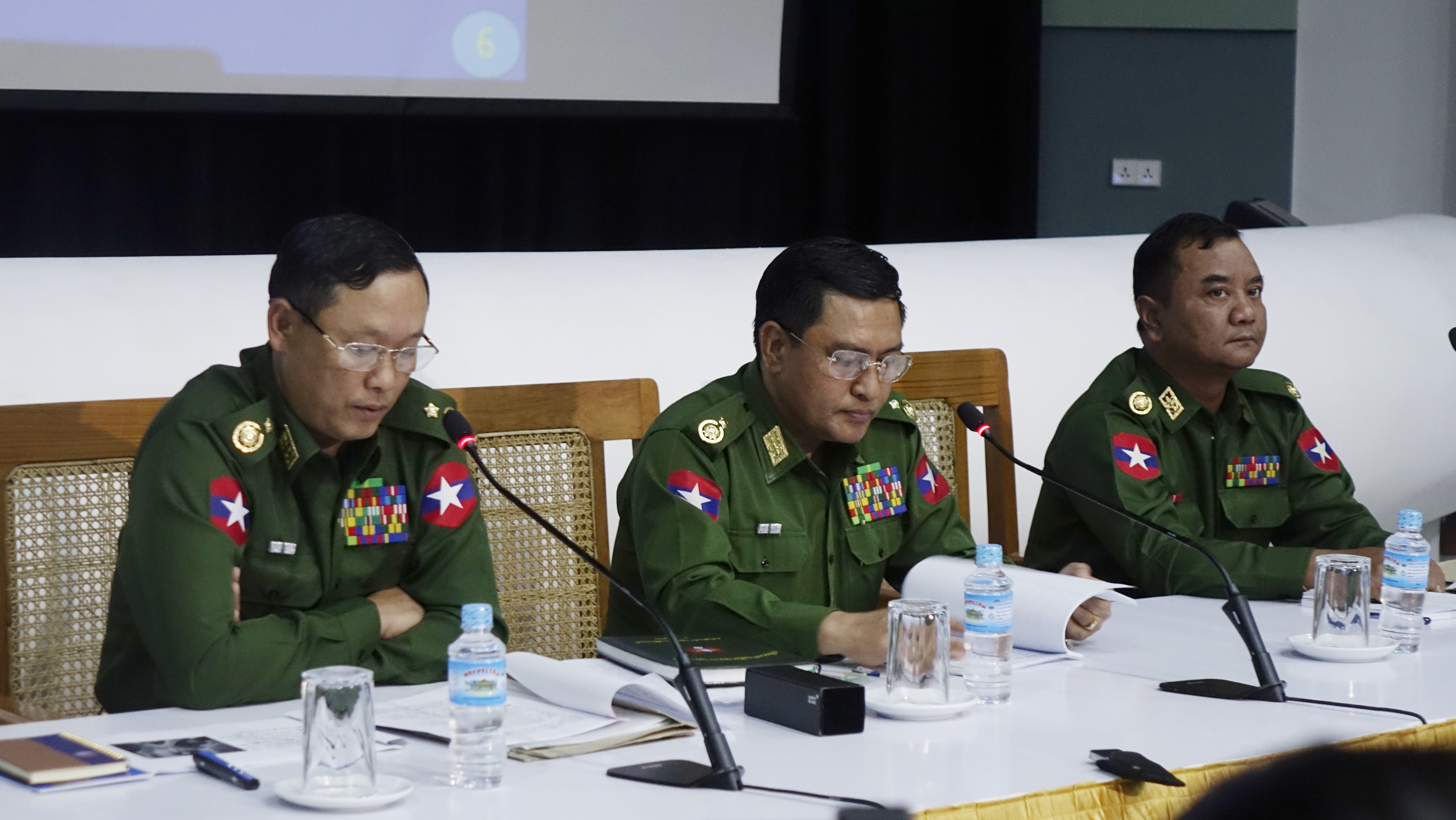
- Tatmadaw True News Information Team during a press conference in 2019 (General Zaw Min Tun (far right), General Soe Naing Oo (in the middle), General Tun Tun Nyi (on the left)
- Formation: 2018
- Type: Military information unit
- Legal status: Defunct
- Headquarters: Naypyidaw, Myanmar (Burma)
- Region served: Myanmar
- Spokesperson: Major General Zaw Min Tun
- Parent organization: Tatmadaw

The Tatmadaw True News Information Team (Burmese: တပ်မတော်သတင်းမှန်ပြန်ကြား‌ရေးအဖွဲ့; IPA: [taʔmədò tədɛ́ɰ̃m̥àɰ̃ pjɪ̀ɰ̃tɕájʔɛ́ ʔəpʰwḛ]) was the official public relations and information unit of the Tatmadaw, the armed forces of Myanmar. The team played a key role in disseminating military statements, countering allegations, and managing the military's communication with the media and the public.

== Establishment and purpose ==
The team was established around 2018 as part of the Tatmadaw's effort to modernize its public relations strategy. Its stated main objective was to provide accurate and timely information about military affairs, counter misinformation, and clarify the army's stance on political and security developments in the country.

== Leadership ==
The team was most prominently led by Major General Zaw Min Tun, a senior Burmese army officer who served as its chief spokesperson. Following the 2021 military coup, he also became the spokesperson for the State Administration Council and Deputy Minister of Information.

== Activities ==
The Tatmadaw True News Information Team regularly organized press conferences, issued public statements, and participated in television interviews to address topics ranging from national security to international criticism. It was seen as the primary channel through which the military communicated with the public.

== Facebook ban ==
On 21 February 2021, Facebook removed the Tatmadaw True News Information Team's official page for repeated violations of its policies, including those against incitement of violence and misinformation.

== Dissolution ==
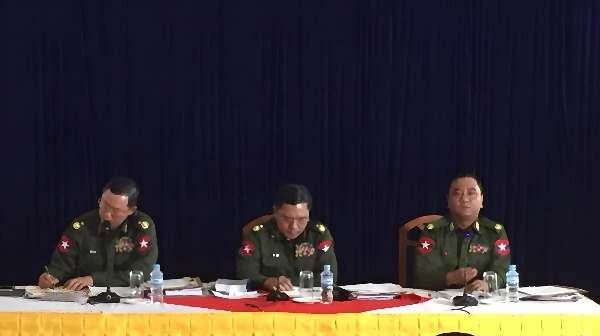
Tatmadaw True News Information Team press conference on 23 February 2019 (from right to left), Brigadier General Zaw Min Tun, Major General Soe Naing Oo, and Major General Tun Tun Nyi.

Following the 2021 military coup and the formation of the State Administration Council, the team became inactive and its functions were absorbed into the SAC's broader information operations. The Tatmadaw True News Information Team has not operated as a distinct entity since then.

== See also ==
- Tatmadaw
- State Administration Council
- Zaw Min Tun
