= Pale Township =

- Township
- Location in Yinmabin district

- Location in Sagaing region

- Location in Myanmar
- Coordinates: 21°56′N 94°53′E
- Country: Myanmar
- Region: Sagaing Region
- District: Yinmabin District
- Capital: Pale
- Time zone: UTC+6.30 (MST)

Pale Township is a township in Yinmabin District in the Sagaing Division of Myanmar. The principal town is Pale.
