= Zaw Min Tun (general) =

Former Burmese army major general and senior government spokesperson

His Excellency Pyidaungsu Sithu Thingaha (Sithu) Zaw Min Tun
- ဇော်မင်းထွန်း
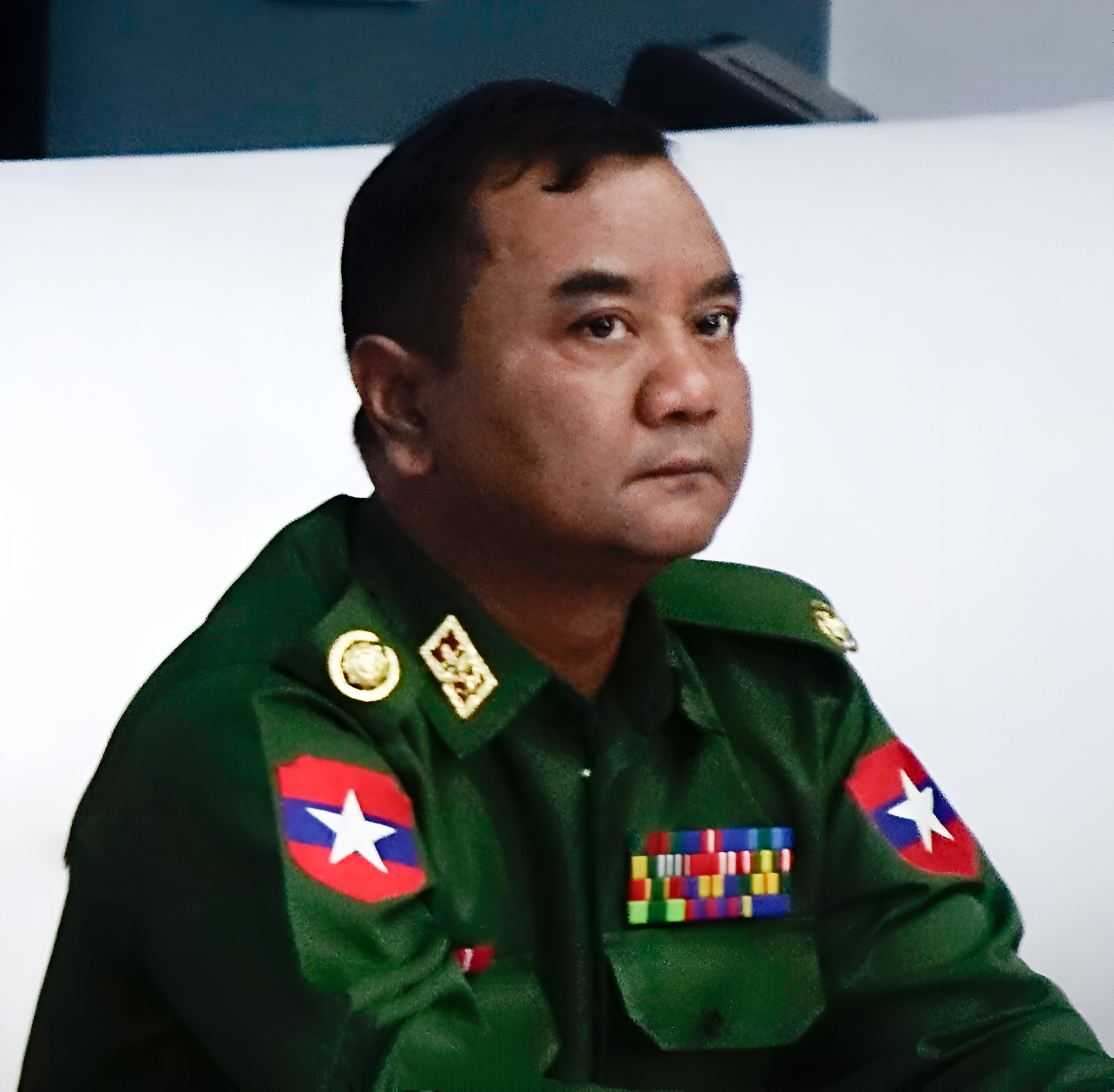
- Zaw Min Tun at a Tatmadaw True News Information Team press conference in January 2019

Deputy Minister of Information of Myanmar
- In office 7 February 2021 – 27 March 2026
- Appointed by: National Defence and Security Council
- President: Min Aung Hlaing (acting); Myint Swe
- Prime Minister: Nyo Saw; Min Aung Hlaing
- Preceded by: Aung Hla Tun

Head of the Press Team of the State Administration Council
- In office 5 February 2021 – 31 July 2025
- Leader: Senior General Min Aung Hlaing
- Preceded by: Position established
- Succeeded by: Position abolished

Chief of the Tatmadaw True News Information Team
- In office 5 February 2021 – 27 March 2026
- Preceded by: Major General Soe Naing Oo

Director of Public Relations and Psychological Warfare of the Myanmar Army
- In office February 2021 – 27 March 2026
- Preceded by: Major General Tun Tun Nyi
- Succeeded by: Brigadier General Ye Yint Aung

Information Team Leader of the National Defence and Security Council
- In office 3 September 2025 – 27 March 2026
- Leader: Senior General Min Aung Hlaing
- Preceded by: Position established

Personal details
- Born: Yenanchaung, Magway Region, Myanmar (Burma)
- Citizenship: Myanmar
- Spouse: Thin Thin Aung
- Children: Thar Htet Htun
- Education: Defence Services Academy (37th intake)
- Occupation: Army general, senior spokesperson, government minister
- Awards: Pyidaungsu Sithu Thingaha (Sithu)
- Website: Ministry of Information (Myanmar)

Military service
- Allegiance: Tatmadaw
- Branch/service: Myanmar Army
- Years of service: 1990–2026
- Rank: Major General
- Battles/wars: Myanmar conflict; 2021 Myanmar coup d'état; Myanmar civil war (2021–present); Operation 1027; Battle of Sain Taung; Battle of Lashio; Rohingya conflict

Zaw Min Tun (Note: Burmese: ဇော်မင်းထွန်း, pronounced [zɔ̀ mɪ́ɰ̃ tʰʊ̀ɴ]) (born in Yenangyaung, Magway Region, Myanmar) is a Burmese army general and government official and he has served as a senior spokesperson for the Myanmar Army. He has served as Deputy Minister of Information of Myanmar since 7 February 2021 and as Information Team Leader of the National Defence and Security Council (NDSC) since 3 September 2025, until his removal from all office positions on 27 March 2026 following an investigation by military leader Senior General Min Aung Hlaing. When the Myanmar military took power in a 2021 coup d'état, Zaw Min Tun became active in official government communications where he regularly appears on public and news conferences. In his official positions, he provides updates and information to local and international media to convey state policies and rules.

He has held many military communications roles, including Director of Public Relations and Psychological Warfare of the Myanmar Army since February 2021, Head of the Press Team of the State Administration Council, and Chief of the Tatmadaw True News Information Team since 5 February 2021. He was officially stripped off from all of his duties and positions on 27 March 2026 and he was replaced by Brigadier General Ye Yint Aung. Zaw Min Tun's sudden purge of all of his positions has been associated with his handling of the military chief Min Aung Hlaing's emergency spinal health injury, fuel related issues caused by the Iran-American-Israel war in the Middle East, and for his involvement in procuring restricted Chinese drones.

== Early life and education ==
Zaw Min Tun was born in Yenangyaung, Magway Region, Myanmar. He attended the Defence Services Academy (DSA) and he graduated as part of the 37th intake. Among his classmates was Zaw Htay, who later served as a spokesperson for both the Presidential Office under Thein Sein and the National League for Democracy (NLD) government.

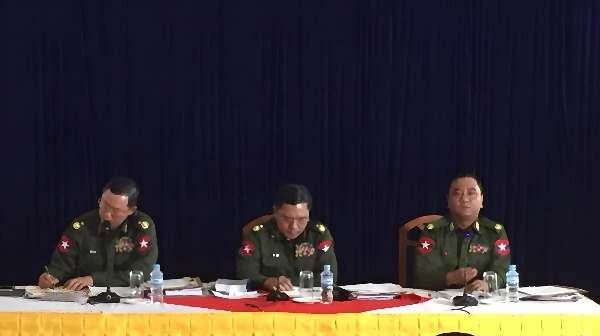
Zaw Min Tun at a Tatmadaw True News Information Team meeting on 23 February 2019

== Military career ==
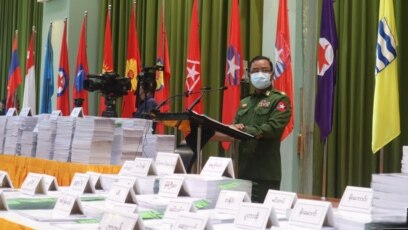
Zaw Min Tun at a Tatmadaw True News Information Team press briefing on 26 January 2021

Zaw Min Tun started his military career after graduating from the Defence Services Academy as part of the 37th intake. He became a spokesperson for the Tatmadaw and represents the military in public and press news conferences.

He enlisted in the Tatmadaw True News Information Team in 2018 when it was established. Serving along his military career, he began to gain experience in public messaging and media coordination.

On 5 February 2021, he was appointed head of the information team, and he succeeded Major General Soe Naing Oo. In the Tatmadaw True News Information Team, Zaw Min Tun worked alongside Major General Soe Naing Oo and Major General Tun Tun Nyi, and regularly holds press briefings, conferences, and meetings to provide updates, respond to inquiries, and clarify official positions to the media and the public.

On 3 September 2025, he was appointed as Information Team Leader of the National Defence and Security Council. In all of these positions, Zaw Min Tun manages official communications, public statements, and media engagements for the council under Senior General Min Aung Hlaing and Prime Minister Nyo Saw.

Zaw Min Tun also served as Director of Public Relations and Psychological Warfare of the Myanmar Army from February 2021, and he succeeded Major General Tun Tun Nyi as the chief. He was serving in this position—until on 27 March 2026, he was removed and purged from the position due to his handling of the Commander-in-chief Senior General Min Aung Hlaing's health spinal injury reporting. As reported in news media, he was replaced with Brigadier General Ye Yint Aung, who served as deputy director of the army director division.

Zaw Min Tun was absent from the 81st Myanmar Armed Forces Day parade on 27 March 2026 and related pre-ceremony events. His resignation is said to be linked to an upcoming cabinet reshuffle in April 2026, in which he is expected to be appointed Minister of Information of Myanmar or as the spokesperson of the President Office of Myanmar. He was promoted from brigadier general to major general in 2020.

Zaw Min Tun became the latest senior high-ranking Burmese army general and officer to be excluded from all official positions and duties.

The Irrawaddy also reported on the fact that his fall came after Senior General Min Aung Hlaing had handpicked him as his new military information minister, as reward for his tireless defending of the 2021 Myanmar coup d'état carried out by the Tatmadaw—Myanmar's armed forces, after alleging of fraud election in the 2020 Myanmar general election, and arrested well-known leaders and politicians of Myanmar, such as State Counsellor Daw Aung San Suu Kyi, the former leader of the NLD party, and the former President of Myanmar U Win Myint.

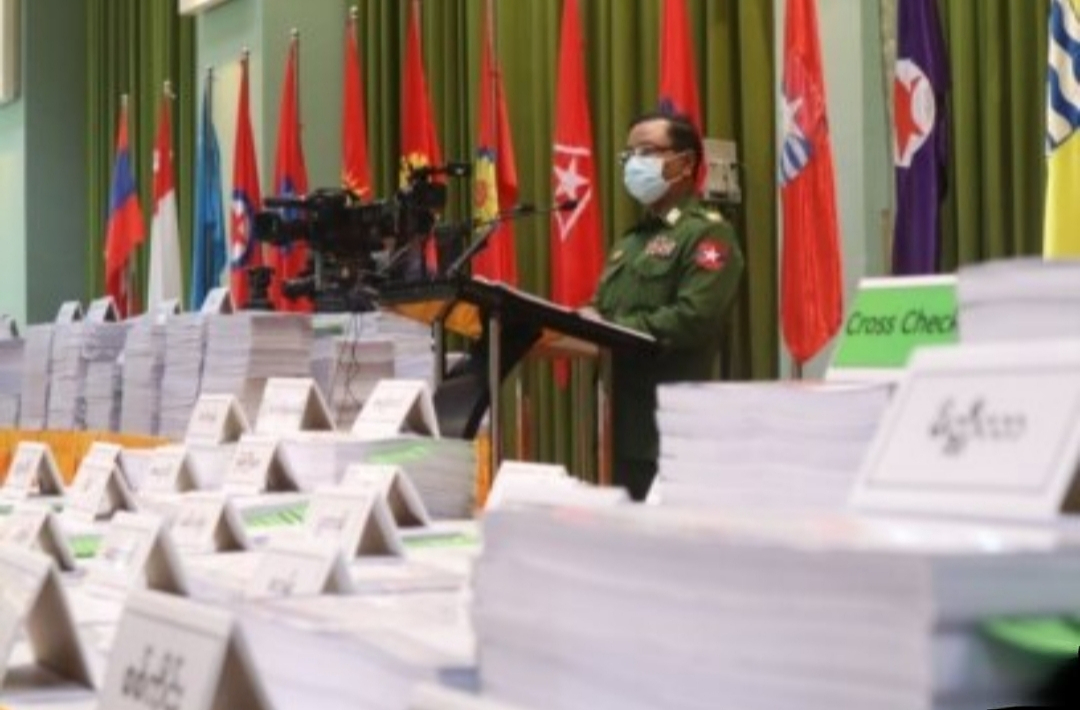
Zaw Min Tun at a Tatmadaw True News Information Team press conference on 26 January 2021

== Public communication and government roles ==
Zaw Min Tun remains as an important spokesperson in the Tatmadaw. He regularly mentions about the civil war in Myanmar, conflicts and war. He has represented the Tatmadaw in local and international media.

He also provides information and updates on the Tatmadaw's operations and the situation in ground.

He regularly appears on public until his position as the Director of Public Relations and Psychological Warfare of the Myanmar Army, military spokesperson, and all official roles were removed on 27 March 2026. Since then, The Irrawaddy reported that he has not appeared in public—and that he had undergone an interrogation following his involvement in procuring restricted Chinese drones.

In 2024, the death of Ashin Munindabhivamsa drew public attention and widespread scrutiny. The Tatmadaw reported that the incident may have been caused by mines laid by the People's Defence Forces. On 21 June 2024, Zaw Min Tun stated that action would be taken against those responsible.

In October 2024, Zaw Min Tun's cousin, Lieutenant Colonel Thet Paing Tun, was killed by resistance forces across Myanmar after he was captured during fighting near the Lucky Men Hotel in Hpakant, Kachin State.

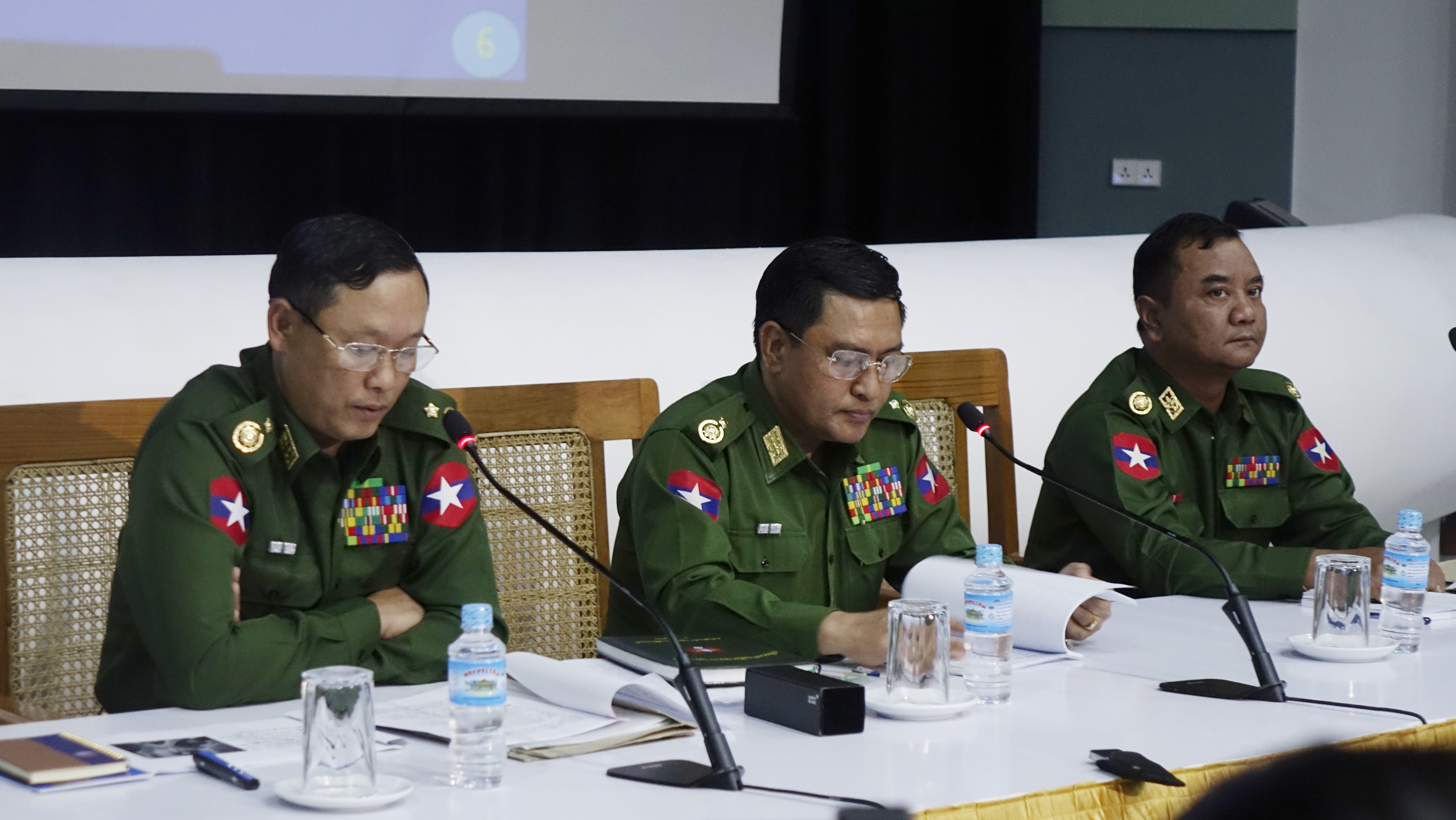
Zaw Min Tun at a Tatmadaw True News Information Team press conference on 18 January 2019

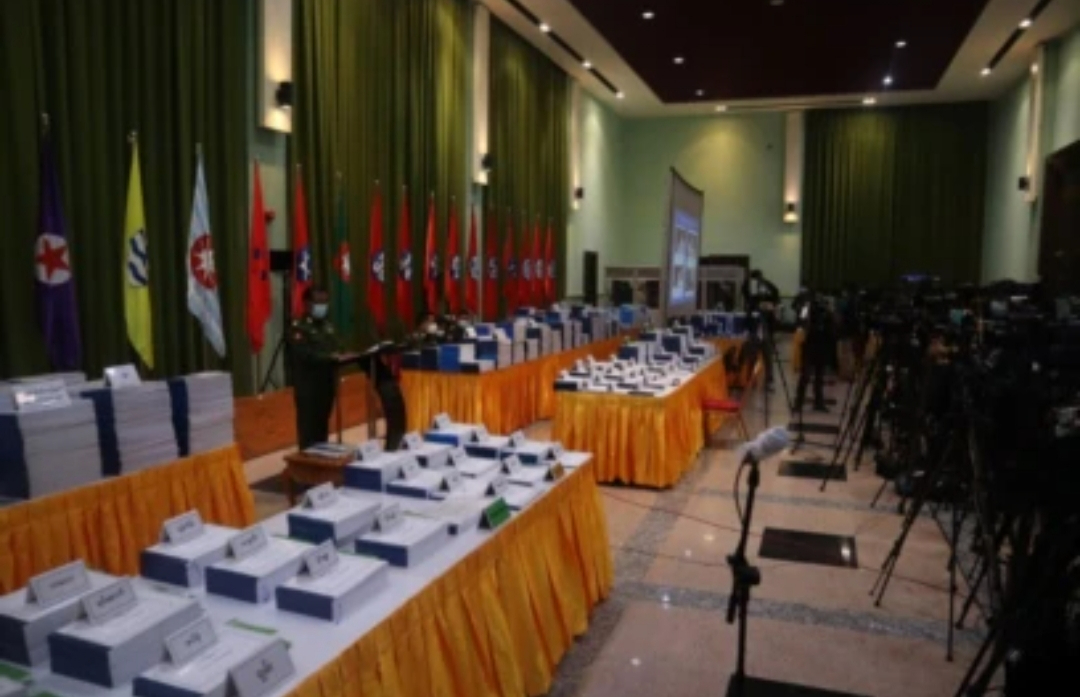
Zaw Min Tun at a Tatmadaw True News Information Team special press conference on 26 January 2021

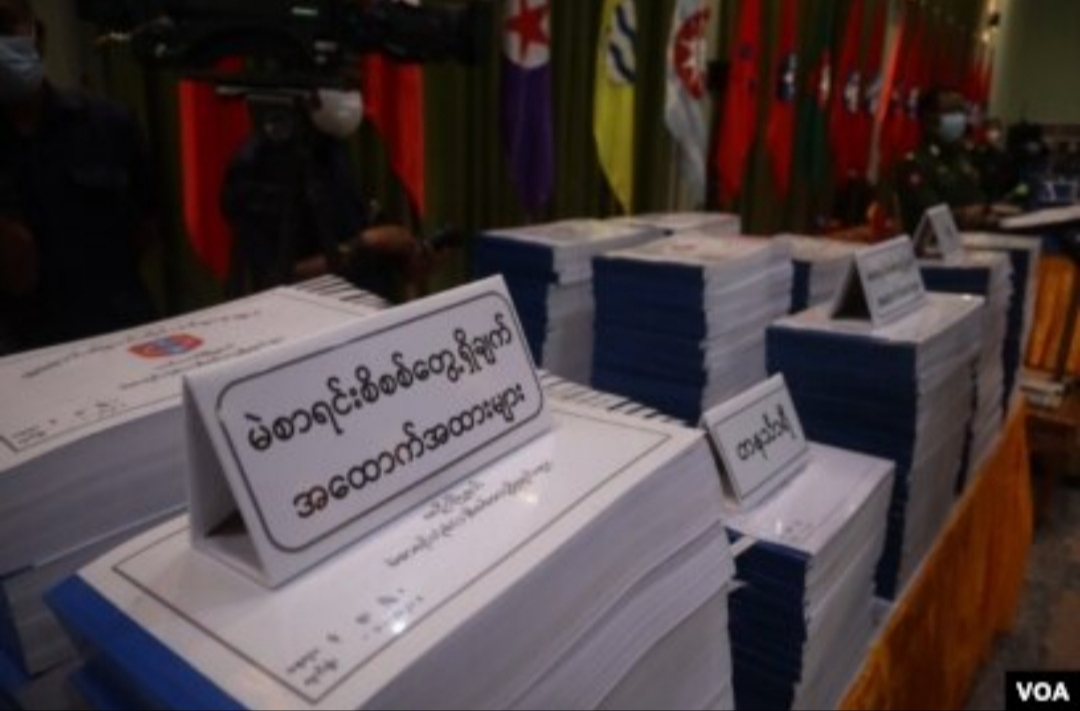
Zaw Min Tun at a Tatmadaw True News Information Team press conference on 26 January 2021

== Awards and honours ==
On 4 January 2026, Zaw Min Tun received awards and honours of the Pyidaungsu Sithu Thingaha (Order of the Union of Burma) and the Sithu honor, two of Myanmar's highest national civilian honors, during Myanmar's Independence Day. He was given those awards in recognition of his public service and contributions in the Myanmar Army.

== Personal life and family ==
Zaw Min Tun is married to Thin Thin Aung, and the couple has one child, Thar Htet Htun. The family generally maintains a low public profile, while they also appear at some official military and government events.

Since removal from all of his duties, he has not appeared in the public, and he was absent in major military events, such as the Myanmar Armed Forces Day parade on 27 March 2026, the same date that all of his positions were stripped off of from him. It is said that he is currently undergoing an investigation following his case.

== See also ==
- State Administration Council
- Ministry of Information (Myanmar)
- National Defence and Security Council
- Tatmadaw True News Information Team

Military offices
Preceded by Major General Tun Tun Nyi	Director of Public Relations and Psychological Warfare of the Myanmar Army; February 2021–27 March 2026	Succeeded by Brigadier General Ye Yint Aung
Preceded by Major General Soe Naing Oo	Chief of the Tatmadaw True News Information Team; February 2021–27 March 2026	Office abolished
Political offices
Preceded by Aung Hla Tun	Deputy Minister of Information of Myanmar; 7 February 2021–27 March 2026	Succeeded by Brigadier General Ye Yint Aung
Preceded by Position established	Head of the Press Team of the State Administration Council; 5 February 2021–31 July 2025	Succeeded by Position abolished
Preceded by Position established	Information Team Leader of the National Defence and Security Council; 3 September 2025–27 March 2026	Succeeded by Brigadier General Ye Yint Aung
