= Kani Township =

- Township
- Location in Yinmabin district

- Location in Sagaing region

- Location in Myanmar
- Coordinates: 22°26′N 94°51′E
- Country: Myanmar
- Region: Sagaing Region
- District: Yinmabin District
- Capital: Kani

Area
  - Total: 1,294.55 sq mi (3,352.9 km^{2})
- Elevation: 265 ft (81 m)

Population (2019)
  - Total: 152,087
  - Density: 117.483/sq mi (45.3603/km^{2})
  - Ethnicities: Bamar
  - Religions: Buddhism
- Time zone: UTC+6.30 (MMT)

Kani Township (Burmese: ကနီမြို့နယ်) is a township in Yinmabin District, Sagaing Region, Myanmar. The township is subdivided into 188 villages grouped into 45 village tract and 1 town, the principal town of Kani, which contains 3 urban wards.

Natural spirulina is available from Twinma and Taung Pauk but their combined yield is a lot less than the yield of Twintaung of Budalin Township.

The township borders Mingin Township in the north and Budalin Township in the east. There are Pone Taung Hills in the west of the township. There are also many streams in the township. At the age of Myanmar dynasties, its area was wider.

== 2021 unrest ==
In December 2021, BBC News reported the Myanmar military carried out four mass killings in July 2021 following the country's February 2021 coup d'etat. The BBC's investigation, which characterized Kani Township as "an opposition stronghold", interviewed 11 alleged witnesses to the killings, and compared them to cellphone videos and photographs collected by Myanmar Witness, a UK-based NGO. The investigation concluded that over 40 people in Kani Township were killed by the military, including at least 14 in one incident in the village of Yin.
