= Yinmabin =

Yinmabin ယင်းမာပင် Yin Mar Bin, Yinmábin
- Town
- Location in Burma
- Coordinates: 22°04′47″N 94°54′08″E
- Country: Myanmar
- Region: Sagaing Region
- District: Monywa District
- Township: Yinmabin Township
- Elevation: 419 m (1,375 ft)
- Time zone: UTC+6.30 (MST)

Yinmabin (Burmese: ယင်းမာပင်မြို့) is a town and seat of the Yinmabin Township in the Sagaing Division in central Myanmar some 100 kilometres (62 mi) west of Mandalay.
