= Yinmabin District =

- District
- Coordinates: 22.173°N 94.747°E
- Country: Myanmar
- Region: Sagaing Region
- No. of Townships: 4
- Capital: Yinmabin
- Time zone: UTC+6.30 (MMT)

Yinmabin District (Burmese: ယင်းမာပင်ခရိုင်) is a newly created district in southern Sagaing Division, Burma (Myanmar); which was formerly part of Monywa District. Its administrative center is the city of Yinmabin.

== Administrative divisions ==
Townships of Yinmabin district

Yinmabin
Salingyi
Pale
Kani

Yinmabin District consists of the following townships:

- Kani Township
- Pale Township
- Salingyi Township
- Yinmabin Township
