= Directorate of Medical Services =

Office of the Commander-in-Chief (Army), Directorate of Medical Services
- ကာကွယ်ရေးဦးစီးချုပ်ရုံး(ကြည်း)၊ ဆေးဝန်ထမ်းညွှန်ကြားရေးမှူးရုံး (Burmese)
- Emblem of the Myanmar Army Medical Corps
- Country: Myanmar
- Branch: Myanmar Army
- Type: Directorate

Commanders
- Director: Maj. Gen. Ko Ko Lwin
- Deputy Director: Brig. Gen. Kyaw Zay Ya

Insignia
- Unit shoulder badge insignia: left and right shoulder of uniform dress

The Directorate of Medical Services (DMS) commands the Myanmar Army Medical Corps. The DMS also commands some military academies jointly with other directorates. Currently the Director of DMS is Maj Gen Soe Win. There are one Director, one deputy director, two Staff Officers (Grade 1) and two Staff Officers (Grade 2) in DMS.

== History ==
At the time of independence in 1948, the army medical corps had two 300-bed military hospitals in Mingaladon and Pyin Oo Lwin, a medical supply depot in Yangon, a dental unit and six camp reception stations located in Myitkyina, Sittwe, Taungoo, Pyinmana, Bago and Meikhtila. Between 1958 and 1962, the medical corps was restructured and all camp reception stations were reorganized into medical battalions.

In the 1990s, the size of DMS was significantly expanded along with the increase in the size of the infantry. In 2007, the DMS had under its administration two 1000-bed Defence Services General Hospitals (Mingaladon and Naypyitaw), two 700-bed Military Hospitals in Pyin Oo Lwin and Aung Ban, two 500-bed military hospitals in Meikhtila and Yangon, one 500-bed Defence Services Orthopedic Hospital in Mingaladon, two 300-bed Defence Services Obstetric, Gynecological and Children hospital (Mingaladon and Naypyitaw), one 300-bed Rehabilitation Hospital (Mingaladon), one 300-bed Defence Services Liver Hospital (Mingaladon), three 300-bed Military Hospital (Myitkyina, Ann and Kengtung), twenty 100-bed Military Hospitals (Mongphyet, Hpa-an, Indaing, Bahtoo, Myeik, Pyay, Loikaw, Namsam, Lashio, Kalay, Mongsat, Dawai, Kawthaung, Laukai, Thandaung, Magway, Sittwe, Hommalin, Bokpyin and Thabeikkyin), one 25-bed Military Hospital (Warzi), fourteen field medical battalions attached to various Regional Military Commands throughout the country. Each field medical battalion consists of a specialist team, three Field Medical Companies with three Field Hospital Units (each with 80 beds). Each field medical company consists of five mobile medical platoons. The Health and Disease Control Unit (HDCU), located in Mingaladon, is responsible for prevention, control and eradication of diseases. The DMS also had a medical depot in Yangon and a forward medical depot in Mandalay.

== Units ==
- Directorate of Medical Services (Nay Pyi Taw)
- 1st DSGH (1000 bedded) (Mingaladon)
- 2nd DSGH (1000 bedded) (Nay Pyi Taw)
- 1st MH (700 bedded) (Pyin Oo Lwin)
- 2nd MH (700 bedded) (Aungban)
- 1st MH (500 bedded) (Meikhtila)
- 2nd MH (500 bedded) (Yangon)
- DSOH (500 bedded) (Mingaladon)
- DSMs (Hmawbi)
- 1st DSOGCH (300 bedded) (Mingaladon)
- 2nd DSOGCH (300 bedded) (Nay Pyi Taw)
- DSLH (300 bedded) (Mingaladon)
- DSRH (300 bedded) (Mingaladon)
- 1st MH (300 bedded) (Myitkyina)
- 2nd MH (300 bedded) (Ann)
- 3rd MH (300 bedded) (Kengtung)
- Medical Depot (Yangon)
- Forward Medical Depot (Mandalay)
- 1st MB (Mandalay)
- 2nd MB (Taunggyi)
- 3rd MB (Taungoo)
- 4th MB (Pathein)
- 5th MB (Mawlamyaing)
- 6th MB (Hmawbi)
- 7th MB (Monywa)
- 8th MB (Sittwe)
- 9th MB (Mohnyin)
- 10th MB (Lashio)
- 11th MB (Bamaw)
- 12th MB (Kengtung)
- 13th MB (Myeik)
- 14th MB (Taikkyi)
- Health and Disease Control Unit (Mingaladon)
- Defence Services Medical Research Unit (Yangon)
- 1st MH (100 bedded) (Mong Hpayak)
- 2nd MH (100 bedded) (Hpa-An)
- 3rd MH (100 bedded) (Inndine)
- 4th MH (100 bedded) (Fort Ba Htoo)
- 5th MH (100 bedded) (Myeik)
- 6th MH (100 bedded) (Pyay)
- 7th MH (100 bedded) (Loikaw)
- 8th MH (100 bedded) (Nansang)
- 9th MH (100 bedded) (Lashio)
- 10th MH (100 bedded) (Kalay)
- 11th MH (100 bedded) (Mong Hsat)
- 12th MH (100 bedded) (Dawei)
- 13th MH (100 bedded) (Kawthaung)
- 14th MH (100 bedded) (Laukkaing)
- 15th MH (100 bedded) (Thandaunggyi)
- 16th MH (100 bedded) (Magway)
- 17th MH (100 bedded) (Sittwe)
- 18th MH (100 bedded) (Boke Pyin)
- 19th MH (100 bedded) (Hommalin)
- 20th MH (100 bedded) (Thabeikkyin)
- 21st MH (100 bedded) (Hpar Pon)
- Workshop Unit (Medical Corps) (Mingaladon) (the commandant of this unit is always engineering officer)
- 1st MH (25 bedded) (Lam Ywar)
- 2nd MH (25 bedded) (Putao)
- 3rd MH (25 bedded) (TanYan)
- 4th MH (25 bedded) (Pan Tawn)
- 5th MH (25 bedded) (Hai Gyi Kyun)
- 6th MH (25 bedded) (Buu Thee Taung)
- 7th MH (25 bedded) (Thin Gan Nyi Naung)
- 8th MH (25 bedded) (Shwe Kyin)
- 9th MH (25 bedded) (Kutkai)
- 10th MH (25 bedded) (Tanai)
- 11th MH (25 bedded) (Mai Pan)
- 12th MH (25 bedded) (Baw Lakei)
- 13th MH (25 bedded) (Kalain Aung)
- 14th MH (25 bedded) (Khamti)
- 15th MH (25 bedded) (Mai Yao)
- 16th MH (25 bedded) (Kyauk Tanaung)
- 17th MH (25 bedded) (Kyauk Taw)
- 18th MH (25 bedded) (MoMeik)
- 19th MH (25 bedded) (Mai Kat)
- 20th MH (25 bedded) (Kon Hein)
- 21st MH (25 bedded) (Kyar Inn)
- 22nd MH (25 bedded) (Matupi)
- 23rd MH (25 bedded) (Taung Nyo)
- MH (25 bedded) (Warzi)

== Affiliations ==
DMS jointly commands these units with C-in-C (Navy)'s office_

- Naval Hospital (Yangon)
- Department of Naval Medicine (Mingalardon)

DMS jointly commands these units with C-in-C (Air)'s office_

- Aviation Physiology Unit (Mingaladon)
- Department of Aviation Medicine (Mingaladon)

DMS jointly operates these academies with Chief of Armed Forces Training's office_

- Defence Services Medical Academy (DSMA) (Mingaladon, Yangon)
- Defence Services Institute of Nursing and Paramedical Science (Mingaladon, Yangon)
- (Defence services medical school ) Hmawbi yangon
