= Defence Services Medical Academy =

Myanmar Armed Forced medical school

Coordinates: 16.9351°N 96.1249°E

Defence Services Medical Academy (DSMA)
- တပ်မတော် ဆေးတက္ကသိုလ်
- Academic logo of DSMA
- Other name: DSMA
- Former name: Defence Services Institute of Medicine (DSIM)
- Motto: Victorious medical practitioner soldiers သမားဇာနည် အောင်စစ်သည်
- Type: Public
- Established: 19 November 1992; 33 years ago
- Academic affiliations: Directorate of Medical Services (Burma), Ministry of Health, Universities Central Council, the Government of the Union of Myanmar[Burma]
- Rector: Khin Aung Htun
- Principal: Aung Myint Oo
- Postgraduates: 242 (2010)
- Location: Yangon, Yangon Region, Myanmar
- Campus: Mingaladon
- Colors: Red, green, white, yellow, orange, blue
- Emblem (CoA) and SSI of DSMA

The Defense Services Medical Academy (DSMA) (Burmese: တပ်မတော် ဆေး တက္ကသိုလ်, pronounced [taʔmədɔ̀ sʰé tɛʔkəθò]), located in Mingaladon, Yangon, is the University of Medicine of the Myanmar Armed Forces. One of the most selective universities in the country, the academy offers M.B.B.S. (equivalent to the M.D.) degree programs. Upon graduation, most DSMA cadets are commissioned with the rank of lieutenant in the Myanmar Army Medical Corps. The military physicians are to serve the healthcare needs of rural people when they are assigned to the country's remote regions where access to healthcare is poor.

== History ==
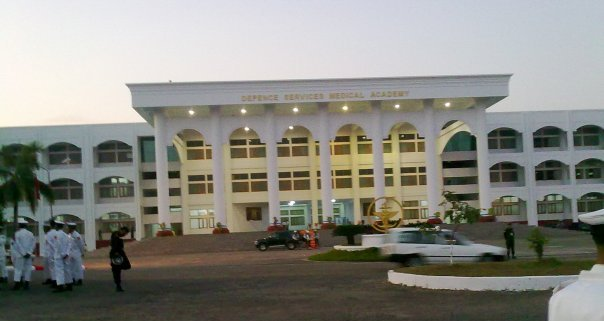
Defense Services Medical Academy

The DSMA was founded in 1992 as the Defence Services Institute of Medicine (DSIM) to develop physicians to serve in the Myanmar Armed Forces. Prior to the founding of the academy, the Tatmadaw had recruited its medical and dental officers from civilian medical school graduates, who had to undergo a month-long basic military training program at the Medical Corps Center. While the medical corps of the Tatmadaw had always been short of physicians, by the early 1990s, the shortage became more pronounced as the military government, fearing student unrest, had shut down most civilian universities, following the 8888 Uprising in 1988. Most civilian universities were closed off and on for much of the 1990s. The military run universities essentially became the only venue for those who wished to continue university education inside the country.

The DSIM was operated by the Ministry of Health and the Directorate of Medical Services. The purported "aim of the DSMA is to produce good medical officers endowed with brilliant physical and mental ability to safeguard The Three Main National Causes" espoused by the military government.

The 47 cadets from the first batch of DSIM were commissioned as lieutenants on 17 December 1999, after six years of study and a year as house-surgeons. Through nine intakes, the DSMA produced a total of 1525 medical officers. As of 2008, the DSMA had produced seven Doctor of Medical Science degree holders. The academy is only source of medical officers for the DMS. In terms of Master of Medical Science, by the early 2008, the DSMA had produced 335 specialists, including 48 physicians and 41 surgeons.

Nowadays, many army doctors' clinics can be seen in Yangon and specialists of army hospital are also practicing at many private hospitals and clinics. Army doctors are serving the country both in rural and urban regions in the form of private and public practice.

== Admissions ==
The academy accepts approximately 400 students annually. Unlike at the country's other four civilian medical schools, the selection process goes beyond high University Entrance Examination scores. All prospective candidates must be male and must have high enough college matriculation exam scores to enter any civilian medical university. In addition, the prospective student must sit for another entrance exam as well as physical and psychological exams. After 2010, the matriculation examination marks are not considered for entrance. Personal interview becomes the most important step for entrance. The academy has accepted fewer than 100 students a year since 2010, and only 40 students are accepted to DSMA in 2012.

The selection criteria are:

- Males/Females not more than 18years of age
- DSMA entrance exams on 1. biology, botany and zoology and 2. English
- Physical fitness
- Teamwork and comradeship screening
- Psychometric assessment
- General interviews
- Medical checkups

The entrance selection including physical fitness tests, teamwork and comradeship screening, psychometric assessments and general interviews process takes about five to seven days at Officer Testing Team. Only those who pass all the tests and steps above are admitted to the DSMA. Students are eligible for state scholarship programs.

The benefit of being a student at DSMA is to get a stipend after acceptance to the school and faster career development than civilian medical doctors. The salary is higher than civilian doctors.

== Programs ==
The DSMA offers courses for both basic and advanced degrees in medicine and surgery, and runs 20 graduate programs in medical sciences.

- Bachelor of Medicine and Surgery (M.B., B.S.)
- Diploma in Medical Science (Dip.Med.Sc.)
- Master of Medical Science (M.Med.Sc.); Physiology, Anatomy, Biochemistry, Microbiology, Pharmacology, Pathology, Public Health, Forensic Medicine, Internal Medicine, Surgery, Obstetrics and Gynaecology, Pediatrics, Orthopedics, Anaesthesiology, Radiology, Otorhinolaryngology, Ophthalmology, Mental Health, Rehabilitation medicine, Radiation oncology.
- Doctor of Medical Science (Dr.Med.Sc.); Medicine, Surgery, Obstetrics and Gynaecology, Pediatrics, Orthopedics, Cardiac surgery, Cardiology, Neurology, Neurosurgery, Radiology, Anaesthesiology. Ophthalmology, Otorhinolaryngology, Urology, Renal Medicine, Forensic Medicine, Gastroenterology, Paediatric surgery, Rehabilitation Medicine.
- Ph.D.
- Diploma in Medical Education

Nowadays, many army doctors are studying in public health master's degree locally as well as internationally. The new generation army doctors are likely to take the duty at Ministry of Health and influence the Myanmar health system set up.

The DSMA is equipped with lab materials, modern textbooks, and training resources. As intern surgeons, the students must take a field practical tour of duty at military hospitals, where they get field training from professional surgeons. The academy is open year-round, and is in session for eleven months of study in an academic year—ten months of medical science coursework plus a month of military science and military leadership. Some DSMA graduates continue their post-graduate education in the UK, India, Thailand, Russia, United States, Germany, Belgium and Singapore.

== Coursework ==
The M.B., B.S. coursework extends for 7 years and is the same as the major coursework of civilian medical schools such as the University of Medicine 1, Yangon and the University of Medicine 2, Yangon.

=== Subjects ===
==== First M.B., B.S. ====
Language & Communication

- Myanmar
- English
- Mathematics & statistics
- Physics
- Chemistry
- Basic Computer Science
- Biology (Botany and Zoology)
- Behavior Sciences
- Introduction of Human Anatomy, Physiology and Biochemistry

==== Second M.B., B.S. ====
- Anatomy
- Physiology
- Biochemistry

==== Third M.B., B.S. ====
- General Human Pathology
- Medical Microbiology
- Clinical Pharmacology

All cadets are posted for 18 weeks each to the medical and surgical wards for clinical training at the school's teaching hospitals in Yangon.

==== Final M.B., B.S. Part I ====
- Forensic Medicine
- Preventive and Social Medicine (with three weeks residential field training in the rural areas)
- Systemic Pathology and Haematology

Students attend lectures and clinics in medicine, surgery, child health, obstetrics and gynaecology and are posted to teaching hospitals, including urban health facilities as part of preventive and social medicine teaching.

==== Final M.B., B.S. Part II ====
- Child Health
- Medicine
- Obstetrics & Gynaecology
- Surgery

Students study the allied specialties: eye, ear, nose and throat diseases, urology, neurology, tuberculosis, venereal diseases, orthopaedics and traumatology, skin diseases, mental health and psychiatry, oro-maxillo-facial surgery, radiology, radiotherapy, nuclear medicine, anaesthesiology, thoracic surgery, and paediatric surgery.

A summative examination is held at the end of the final M.B., B.S. Part II course. Problem based learning, task based learning, community based learning, and behavioural science are incorporated, as relevant.

==== House surgeon training ====
All students, after a successful completion of Final Part 2 MBBS Examination, continue on to hands-on training for one year as house surgeons in the recognized teaching hospitals in Yangon and/or the state and division hospitals.

Only after the completion of house-surgeonship is the student awarded the M.B., B.S. degree.

Every DSMA cadet also studies military science and military leadership for one to two months per year from First M.B., B.S. to Final M.B., B.S. Part I. After graduation, every medical officer has been trained as a platoon commander.

Medical Officers are trained in military hospitals for one-year duration.

After studying one year as a medical officer, they become a regimental medical officer and serve for the country. There is one and half year refresher course at military hospitals every three years.

=== Teaching environment ===
- Defence Services General Hospital, Yangon (1000 bed, Mingaladon)
- Defence Services General Hospital, Naypyitaw (1000 bed, Naypyitaw)
- Defence Services Obstetric, Gynaecological and Children's Hospital, Mingaladon, Yangon (300 bed)
- Defence Services Orthopaedic Hospital, Mingaladon, Yangon (500 bed)
- Defence Services Liver Hospital (500 bed, Mingaladon, Yangon)
- No. 2 Military Hospital (500 bed, Myoma Street, Dagon, Yangon)
- Defence Services Obstetric, Gynaecological and Children's Hospital, Naypyidaw (300 bed)
- Defence Services General Hospital, Pyinoolwin (700 bed)
- Defence Services General Hospital, Meitila (500 bed)
- Defence Services General Hospital, Aungban (700 bed)
- National Health laboratory
- Directorate of Medical Research (lower Myanmar)

== See also ==
- List of universities in Myanmar
- Medical Universities (Myanmar)
