= Thanlyin Township =

Thanlyin Township သန်လျင်မြို့နယ်
- Township
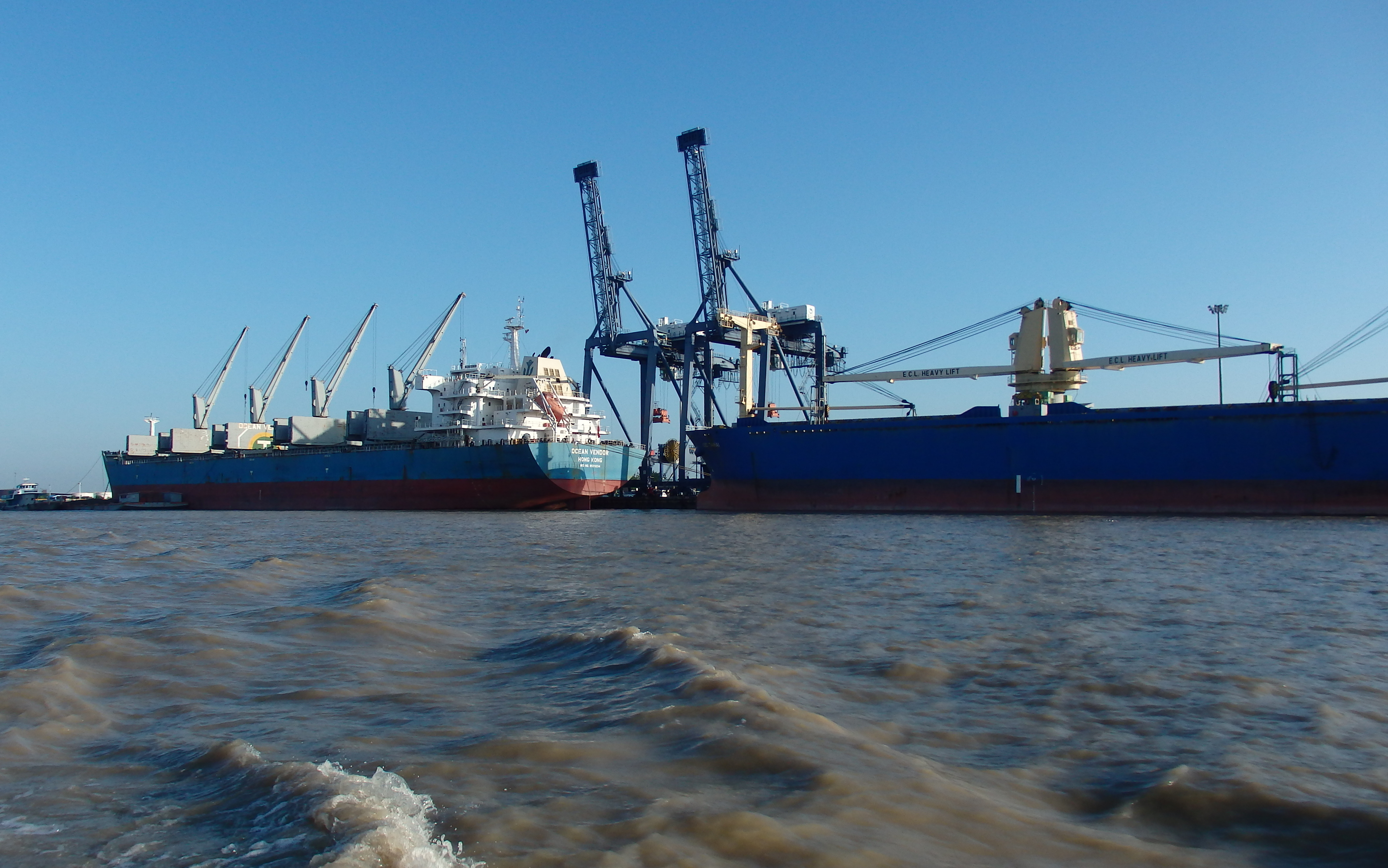
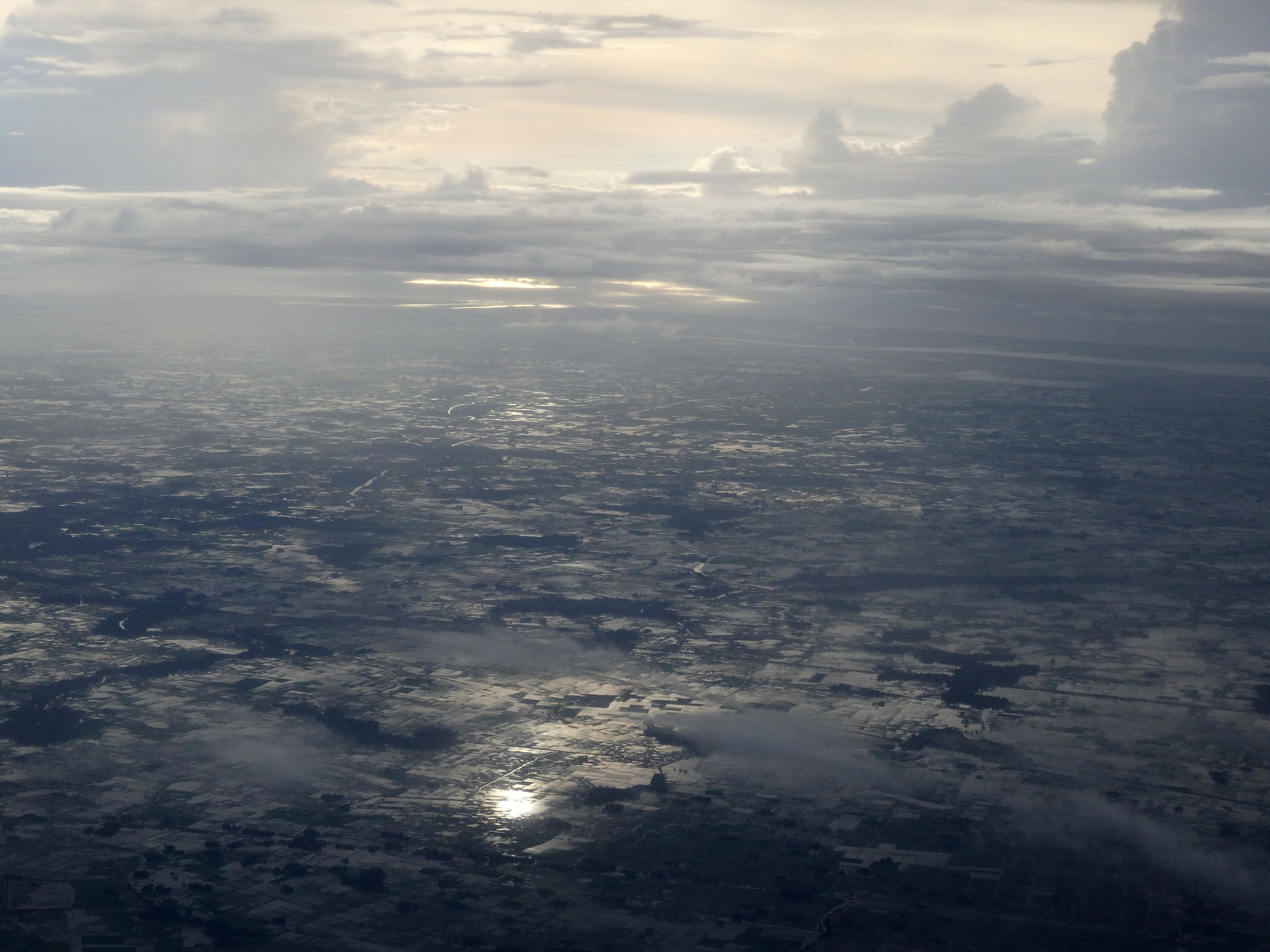
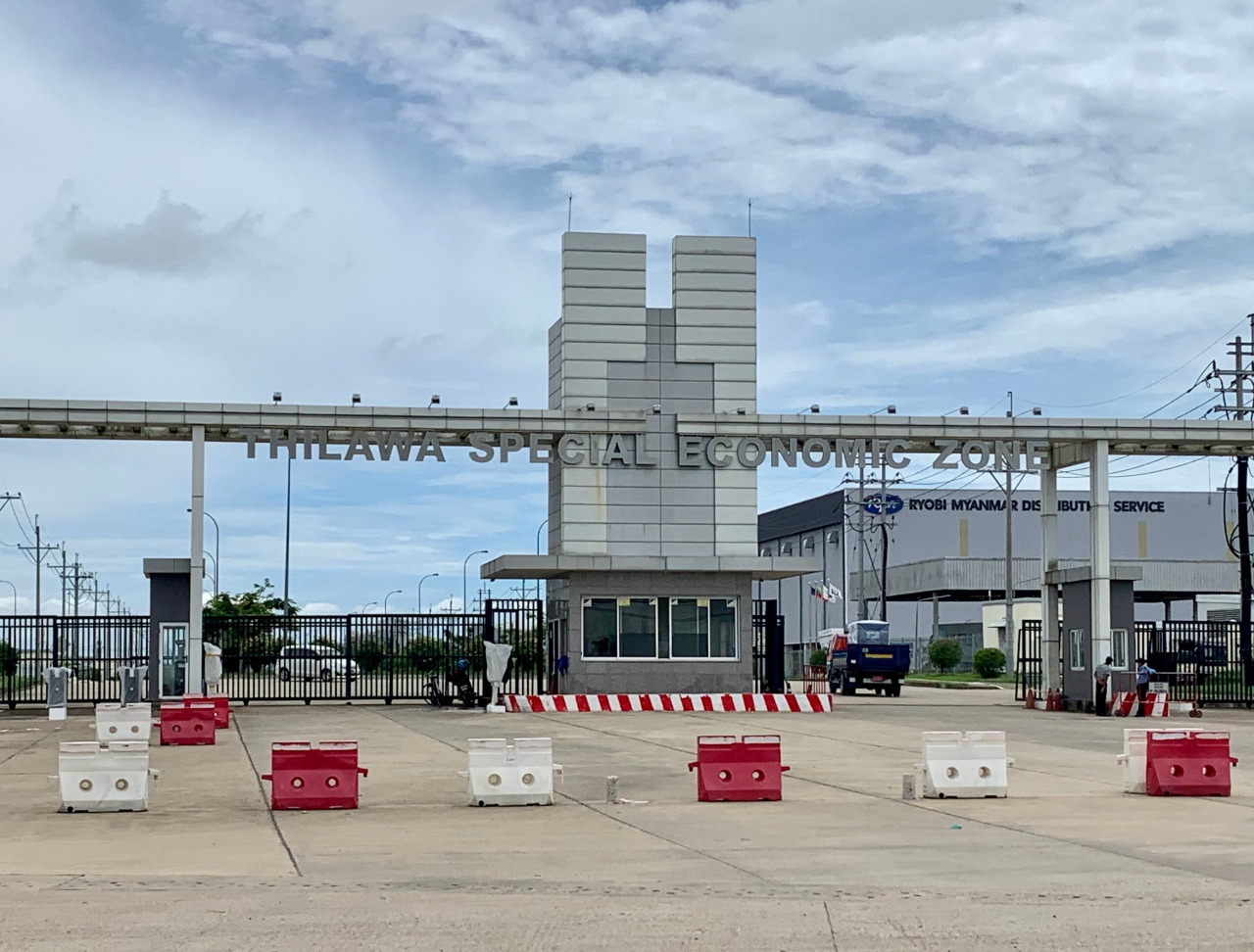
- Ships at Thilawa Port Aerial view of farms in eastern Thanlyin Entrance to the Thilawa Special Economic Zone

- Location of Thanlyin Township in Thanlyin District
- Coordinates: 16.753°N 96.328°E
- Country: Myanmar
- Region: Yangon Region
- District: Thanlyin District

Area
  - Total: 143.98 sq mi (372.9 km^{2})
- Elevation: 10 ft (3.0 m)

Population
  - Total: 282,943
  - Ethnicities: Bamar
  - Religions: Buddhism; Hinduism
- Time zone: UTC+6.30 (MMT)

Thanlyin Township (Burmese: သန်လျင်မြို့နယ်) is a township in Thanlyin District, southeast Yangon Region, Myanmar. The township has only one town- the principal town of Thanlyin, which has seventeen urban wards. The township also has 57 villages grouped into 28 village tracts. The township located across the Bago River from the city of Yangon and is home to Thilawa Port, the largest port terminal in Myanmar.

== History ==
Thanlyin became a prominent port city during the Hanthawaddy kingdom when the port of Bago became silted in the 15th century. In 1599, the city was conquered by the Kingdom of Mrauk U's Portuguese mercenaries. The leader of the mercenaries Filipe de Brito e Nicote was made governor of the city. However, in 1603, De Brito declared independence with the help of Goa and, after the 1605 Syriam battles, successfully established Portuguese rule over Syriam. He was declared King of Sirião. 10 years later, Anaukpetlun of the restored Taungoo Dynasty retook the city, and executed de Brito by impalement. In 1613, Burmese king Anaukpetlun recaptured the city, and executed Brito by impalement, a punishment reserved for defilers of Buddhist temples.

Thanlyin remained the major port of the Taungoo kingdom until the mid-18th century. In the 1740s, Thanlyin was made the base of the French East India Company for their help in the Mon's reestablishment of Hanthawaddy Kingdom. The arrangement lasted until 1756, when King Alaungpaya of Konbaung dynasty captured the city. From then on, the importance has shifted to Yangon across the river.

In 1990, the township saw renewed development as Thanlyin was identified as a location for a new deep-water port to replace the overcrowded ports in Yangon. The new Thilawa Port was built, becoming the country's largest port, with special economic zones and industrial parks planned nearby.

== Education ==
Thanlyin also has several universities, all located just outside the limits of Thanlyin town. It is home to Myanmar Maritime University, one of the most selective universities in Burma. Since the early 2000s, students from Thanlyin and surrounding suburbs have had to attend local universities: the University of East Yangon for liberal arts and sciences, Technological University, Thanlyin for engineering and Co-operative University, Thanlyin for business.
