= Hmawbi District =

District in Yangon Region, Myanmar

Hmawbi District မှော်ဘီ ခရိုင်
- District
- Hmawbi District
- Hmawbi District in Yangon region
- Coordinates (District in Myanmar): 17.10°N 96.03°E
- Country: Myanmar
- Region: Yangon Region
- Area code: +951
- Geocode: Hmawbi
- ISO 3166 code: MM-06

Hmawbi District (Burmese: မှော်ဘီ ခရိုင်) is a district in Yangon Region, Myanmar. It is north of the city of Yangon and contains Hmawbi Township and Htantabin Township.

== Background ==
The district was created alongside a larger reorganization of Yangon Region's subdivisions on 30 April 2022. The former North Yangon District along with the other three districts were expanded to 14 districts by the provisional government. To its north, it borders Taikkyi District, to its east it borders Hlegu District. To its south it borders parts of Yangon city, including Insein District and Mingaladon District.

The principal town of the district is Hmawbi and Hmawbi airport is at Indan, 4 kilometres (2.5 mi) northeast of the town of Hmawbi.

== See also ==
- List of districts and neighborhoods of Yangon
