= Paunglin Dam =

- Interactive map of Paunglin Dam
- Official name: ပေါင်းလင်းဆည်
- Country: Myanmar
- Location: Hlegu Township, Yangon Region, Myanmar
- Coordinates: 17.508646714524172°N 96.09513965531147°E
- Purpose: Irrigation, Water supply
- Status: Operational
- Opening date: March 2003; 23 years ago

Paunglin Dam (Burmese: ပေါင်းလင်းဆည်) is a dam in Yangon Division, Burma. It is located near the city of Hlegu, northeast of Yangon. The dam and the Ngamoeyeik Reservoir supply irrigation water to over 28,300 hectares (70,000 acres) of farmland between Hlegu and Yangon, and nearly 340 million liters (90 million gallons) of water a day to the people living in Yangon. The dam was opened in March 2004.
