= Hlawga =

Hlawga may refer to:

- Hlawga National Park, a national park in Myanmar
- Hlawga Lake, a water reservoir in Yangon Division, Myanmar
