= Kyaikkhauk Pagoda =

Buddhist Pagoda in Yangon, Myanmar

- ကျိုက်ခေါက်စေတီတော်
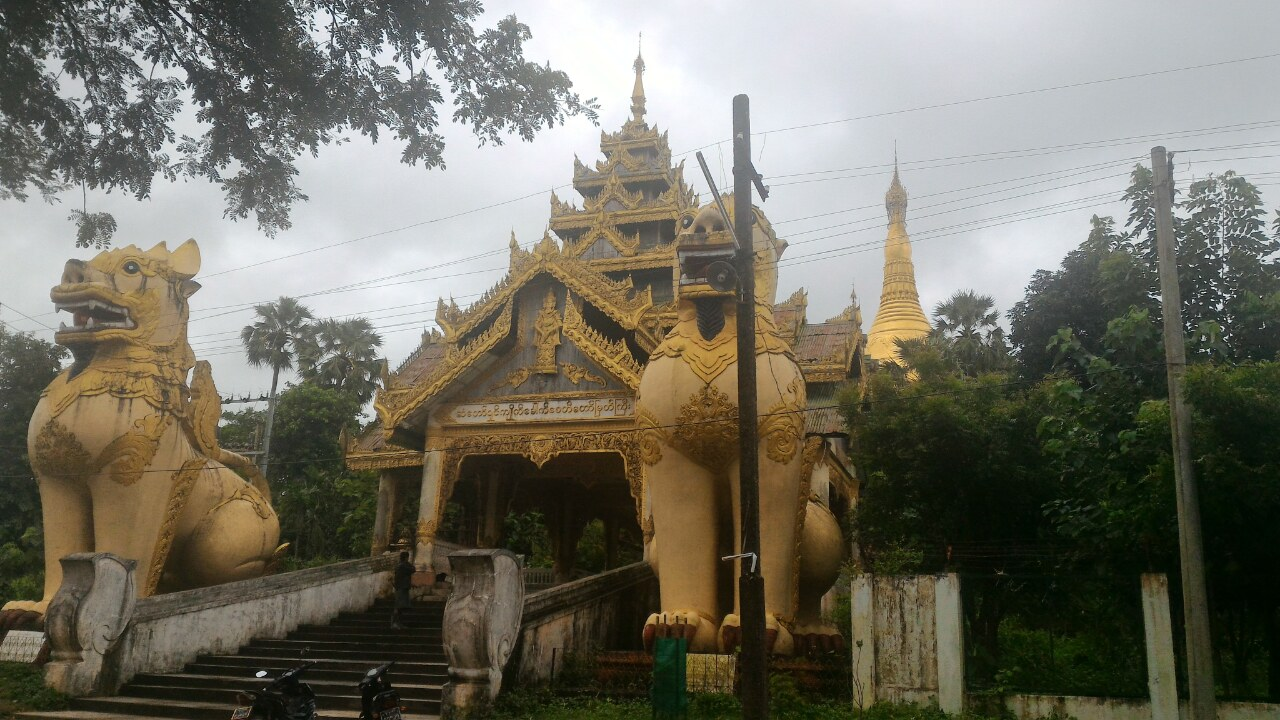
- Kyaikkhauk Pagoda
- Interactive map of the Kyaikkhauk Pagoda area

General information
- Type: Buddhist pilgrims and missionaries
- Location: Thanlyin Township, Myanmar
- Coordinates: 16.730321°N 96.270943°E

Design and construction
- Architect: King Sulathrim

Kyaikkhauk Pagoda (Burmese: ကျိုက်ခေါက်စေတီတော်) is a Buddhist pagoda located in Thanlyin Township, in southern Yangon Region, Myanmar. It is a popular tourist destination and also pilgrimage site for Buddhists. It is believed that the pagoda was built on Hlaingpotkon Hill about 2000 years ago by King Sulathrima of Thaton. There are four stairways and the pagoda resembles a Mon-style stupa. A pagoda festival is held in February each year (the 1st waxing to full moon of the Burmese month of Tabodwe) . During Cyclone Nargis, the pagoda, which was located on higher elevation, served as a storm shelter for local villagers.

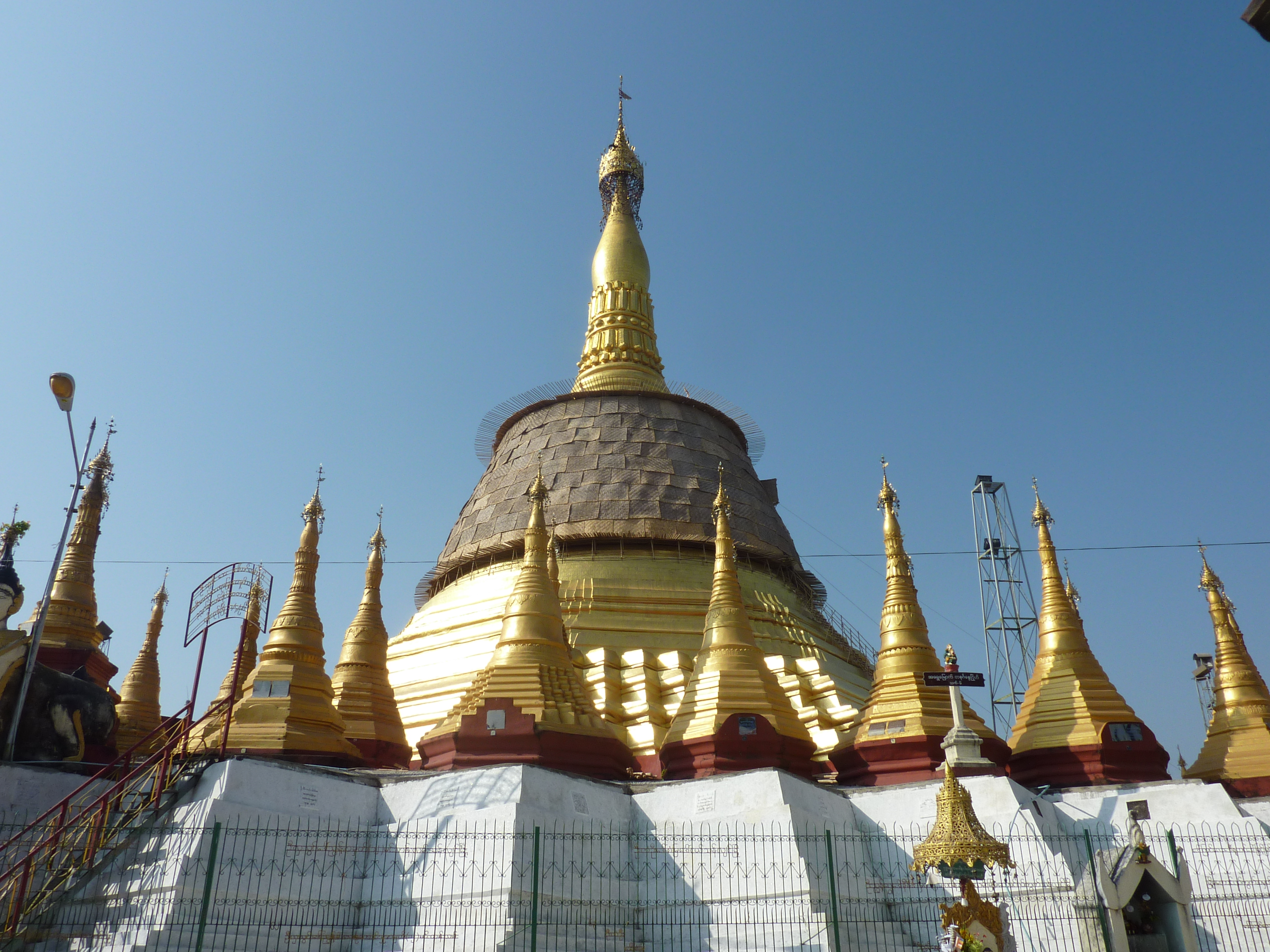

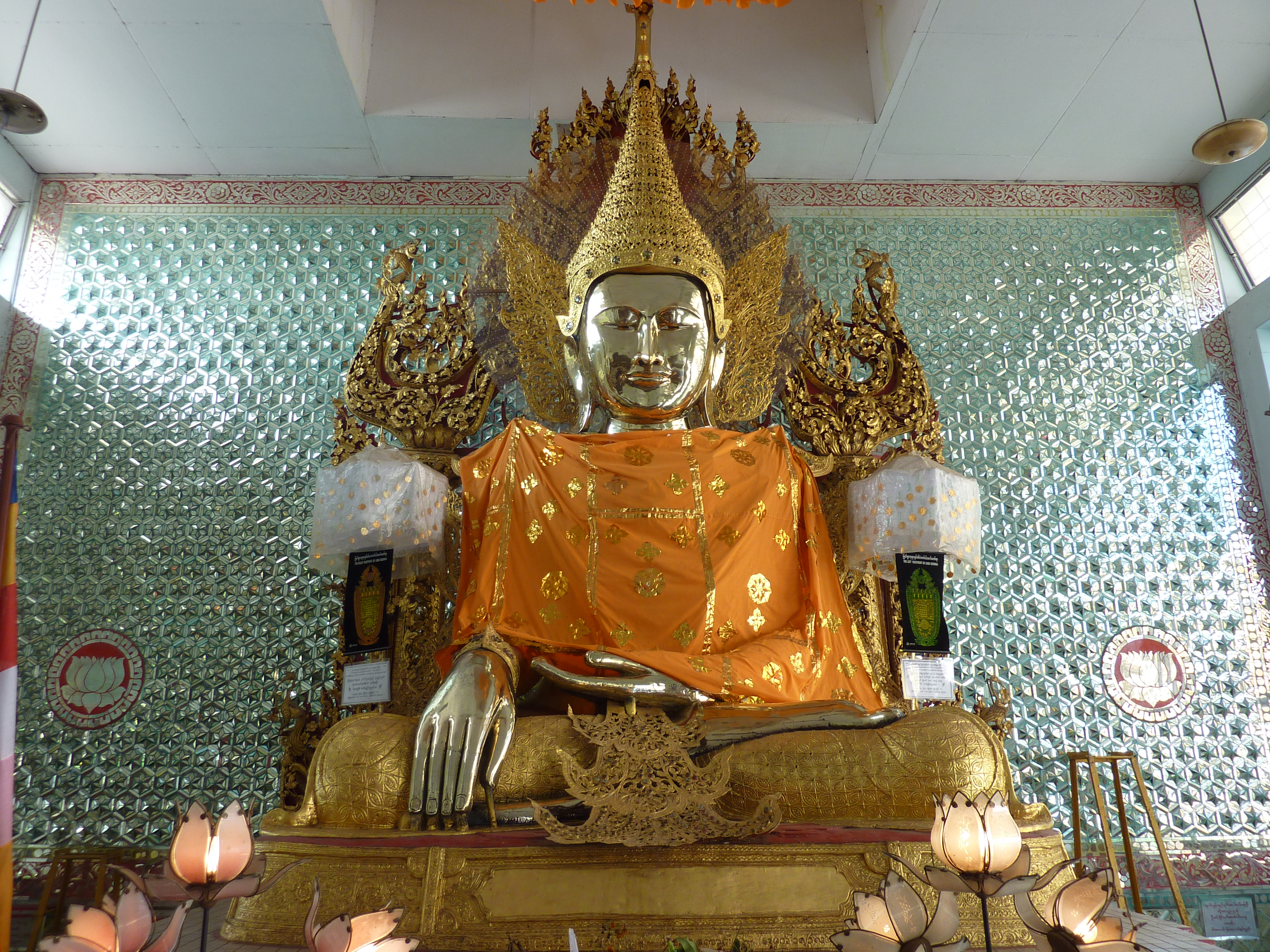
