= Htantabin, Yangon =

Town in Yangon Region, Myanmar

Htantabin ထန်းတပင်မြို့
- Town
- Interactive map of Htantabin
- Coordinates: 17.020°N 95.981°E
- Country: Myanmar
- Region: Yangon Region
- District: Hmawbi District
- Township: Htantabin Township

Area
  - Total: 0.77 sq mi (2.0 km^{2})

Population (2023)
  - Total: 10,977
  - Density: 14,000/sq mi (5,500/km^{2})
- Time zone: UTC+6:30 (MMT)

Htantabin (Burmese: ထန်းတပင်မြို့) is a town in northwest Yangon Region, southern Myanmar. It is the seat of the Htantabin Township in the Hmawbi District. The town is located near the confluence of the Myitmakha and Hlaing River distributaries of the Ayeyarwady River. It is located 20 miles from the centre of Yangon and has 5 urban wards. Although the township was defined in Section 4 of the 1907 Burma Cities Act, the town was only promoted to town status in 1910 with the first town offices opening in 1915.

In 2023, a teenager drowned in Htantabin during a construction accident.
