= Thanlyin Bridge =

Thanlyin Bridge သန်လျင် တံတား
- Coordinates: 16°47′29″N 96°13′57″E
- Carries: 2 lanes, 1 rail track, 2 pedestrian walk lanes
- Crosses: Bago River
- Locale: Yangon and Thanlyin
- Official name: Thanlyin Bridge
- Maintained by: Ministry of Transportation

Characteristics
- Design: Truss Bridge
- Total length: 2.2 km
- Width: 2 traffic lanes, single rail track, 2 pedestrian walk lanes

History
- Construction start: 1985
- Construction end: 1993
- Opened: 31 July 1993

Statistics
- Daily traffic: heavy
- Toll: No

Thanlyin Bridge (Burmese: သန်လျင် တံတား), also spelled Thanhlyin Bridge or Than Hl Yin Bridge, is a bridge that links the cities of Thanlyin and Yangon in Myanmar. The bridge crosses the 1-km wide Bago river, and is situated about 42 km northeast from the river's confluence with Yangon river. The bridge has a single rail track in the middle, surrounded by a motorcycle roadway on each side.

Highway 6 goes over the bridge and connects Yangon with the Thilawa port and Thanlyin Industrial Zone.

The bridge will soon be joined by the Thanlyin Bridge 2, which has been under construction since the mid-2000s with assistance from Japan.

== History ==
The bridge was built with Chinese financial and technical assistance. Construction of the bridge began in 1985 but was suspended for about eight months from August 1988 to April 1989 due to unstable political conditions following the uprising of 1988. The total cost of the bridge was Ks.1.65 billion, including a ¥207 million interest free loan from China.
