= Htantabin Township =

Htantabin Township ထန်းတပင် မြို့နယ်
- Township
- Htantabin Township in Hmawbi District
- Coordinates: 17°8′0″N 95°55′0″E
- Country: Myanmar
- Region: Yangon
- District: Hmawbi
- Capital: Htantabin

Population (2014)
  - Total: 145,792
- Time zone: UTC6:30 (MST)
- Area codes: 1 (mobile: 80, 99)

Htantabin Township (Burmese: ထန်းတပင် မြို့နယ်, pronounced [tʰáɰ̃dəbɪ̀ɰ̃ mjo̰nɛ̀]) is a township in Hmawbi District located on the western border of central Yangon Region, Myanmar. Its administrative seat is Htantabin which is located in the southeastern part of the township on the western bank of the Hlaing River just south of its confluence with the Kokkowa River.

The township is partially urbanized, although it is not part of the city of Yangon. The majority of the land is still in agriculture. In addition to agricultural work on the farms, the main sources of employment are as factory workers, temporary manual labor, as civil servants, and work in a variety of small to medium-size businesses. Htantabin township is home to the University of West Yangon.

The township will be home to a 270 megawatt coal-fired power plant built by Htoo Trading, which will supply electricity to Yangon's industrial zones.

== Communities ==
There are 59 Village Tracts in the township consisting of 230 villages.

== Human Rights Violations in the Region ==
On 29 December 1994 at 11:00 p.m., SLORC troops from IB 73 threw a grenade into a crowd while they were holding a religious ceremony in In Gyin Koe Village, Htantabin Township, Pegu Division, causing the deaths of 10 villagers and wounding 24 others. [PDC]

On February 5, 1998, Burmese Army troops tortured, shot and killed a pastor, Maung Ohn Kyi, and his son-in-law in Kawtupoe village of Htantabin township.

== Borders ==
The township's eastern border is formed by the Hlaing River. Its southwestern boundary is formed by the Panhlaing River and part of its western border is formed by the Bawle River. Htantabin Township borders:

- Zalun Township, Ayeyarwady Region, to the northwest;
- Taikkyi Township to the northeast and east;
- Hmawbi Township and Shwepyitha Township to the east;
- Hlaingthaya Township to the southeast;
- Twante Township to the southwest; and
- Nyaungdon Township and Danubyu Township of Ayeyarwady Region, to the west.
