= Myanmar Army Medical Corps =

- Emblem (Note: Also use as shoulder sleeve insignia (SSI).)
- Active: 1 October 1947 (77 years ago) – current
- Country: Myanmar
- Branch: Army
- Size: 20,000
- Part of: Myanmar Armed Forces
- Motto(s): Make fit to fight

Commanders
- Director of Medical Services: Major General Ko Ko Lwin
- Deputy Director of Medical Services: Brigadier general Kyaw Zay Ya

Insignia
- Flag

The Myanmar Army Medical Corps (MAMC) is a specialist corps in the Myanmar Army which provides medical services to all Myanmar Army personnel and their families. The MAMC forms the Myanmar Armed Forces' essential military medical services under the command of the Directorate of Medical Services.

== Units ==
- Defence Services Medical Research Centre (Nay Pyi Taw)
- Medical Corps Centre (Hmawbi, Yangon Command)
- No.(1) Field Medical Battalion (Mandalay, Central Command)
- No.(2) Field Medical Battalion (Taunggyi, Eastern Command)
- No.(3) Field Medical Battalion (Taungoo, Southern Command)
- No.(4) Field Medical Battalion (Pathein, South-west Command)
- No.(5) Field Medical Battalion (Mawlamyine, South-east Command)
- No.(6) Field Medical Battalion (Hmawbi, Yangon Command)
- No.(7) Field Medical Battalion (Monywa, North-west Command)
- No.(8) Field Medical Battalion (Sittwe, Western Command)
- No.(9) Field Medical Battalion (Mohnyin, Northern Command)
- No.(10) Field Medical Battalion (Lashio, North-east Command)
- No.(11) Field Medical Battalion (Bhamo, Northern Command)
- No.(12) Field Medical Battalion (Kengtung, Triangle Region Command)
- No.(13) Field Medical Battalion (Myeik, Coastal Region Command)
- No.(14) Field Medical Battalion (Taikkyi, Yangon Command)
- Health and Disease Control Unit (Naypyidaw, Naypyidaw Command)

The Medical Corps Centre, located in Hmawbi, is responsible for training and research. Fourteen field medical battalions are deployed in strategic locations throughout the country. Each battalion consists of three field medical companies, three field hospital units and a specialist team. The Health and Disease Control Unit (HDCU) is responsible for prevention, control and eradication of diseases.
