= Thanlyin District =

District in Yangon Region, Myanmar

Thanlyin District သန်လျင်ခရိုင်
- District
- Thanlyin District in Yangon region
- Coordinates (District in Myanmar): 16.728°N 96.537°E
- Country: Myanmar
- Region: Yangon Region
- Area code: +951
- Geocode: Thanlyin
- ISO 3166 code: MM|MM-06

Thanlyin District (Burmese: သန်လျင်ခရိုင်) is a district in southern Yangon Region, Myanmar. It lies across the Bago River from the city of Yangon and contains five townships.

== Background ==
The district was created alongside a larger reorganization of Yangon Region's subdivisions on 30 April 2022. The former South Yangon District along with the other three districts were expanded to 14 districts by the provisional government. To its north, it borders Dagon Myothit District and Hlegu District, to its east it borders Bago Region and its west Twante District. To its south lies the Andaman Sea. Although most of the districts lie on the mainland, the small Cocokyun Township was also incorporated into the district. The principal town of the district is Thanlyin.

The District contains the Thilawa Port, the country's largest port.
