= Myaing Hay Wun Elephant Park =

Wildlife park in Burma

- Interactive map of Myaing Hay Wun Elephant Park
- Location: Taikkyi Township, Yangon Division, Burma
- Coordinates: 17.491764°N 96.004191°E
- Area: 10 acres (40,000 m^{2})
- Established: 1986

Myaing Hay Wun Elephant Park is a small wildlife park of Burma. It is located in Taikkyi Township in Yangon Division. It occupies an area of 10 acres (40,000 m^{2}) and was established in 1986.
