= Hmawbi Township =

Township in Yangon Region, Myanmar

Hmawbi Township မှော်ဘီမြို့နယ်
- Township
- Hmawbi Township
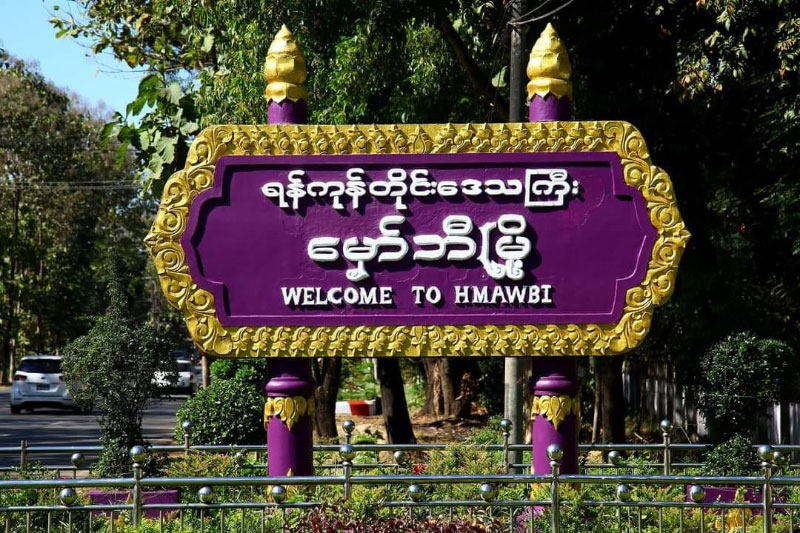
- Hmawbi Township

- Coordinates: 17.10°N 96.03°E
- Country: Myanmar
- State: Yangon Region
- District: Hmawbi District
- Capital: Hmawbi

Area
  - Total: 200 sq mi (520 km^{2})

Population (2023)
  - Total: 242,628
  - Density: 1,200/sq mi (470/km^{2})
- Time zone: UTC+6:30

Hmawbi Township (မှော်ဘီ မြို့နယ်) is located in Hmawbi District, northwest of Yangon City. The principal town and administrative seat is Hmawbi.

The Hmawbi airport is at Indan, 4 kilometres (2.5 mi) northeast of the town of Hmawbi.

In 2014, the township had 244,607 people.

== Borders ==
The Hlaing River forms the western border of Hmawbi Township, which borders on:

- Taikkyi Township to the north;
- Hlegu Township to the east;
- Mingaladon Township to the southeast;
- Shwepyitha Township to the south; and
- Htantabin Township to the southwest, west and northwest.
