= Thongwa Township =

Thongwa Township သုံးခွ မြို့နယ်
- Township

- Location within Myanmar
- Country: Myanmar
- Region: Yangon Region
- District: Thanlyin District
- Capital: Thongwa

Population (2014)
  - Total: 157,876
- Time zone: UTC6:30 (MMT)
- Area code: 056

Thongwa Township (Burmese: သုံးခွ မြို့နယ်) is a township of the Thanlyin District in Yangon Region, Myanmar. It is located by the Gulf of Martaban in the southeastern part of the region.
