= UWY =

UWY may refer to:

- University of Wyoming, United States
- University of West Yangon, Myanmar
- the student center at University of Washington Tacoma
