= Mingaladon District =

District in Yangon Region, Myanmar

Mingaladon District မင်္ဂလာဒုံခရိုင်
- District
- Mingaladon District in Yangon Region
- Coordinates: 16.984°N 96.116°E
- Country: Myanmar
- Region: Yangon Region
- City: Yangon
- Area code: +951

Mingaladon District (Burmese: မင်္ဂလာဒုံခရိုင်) is a district in northern Yangon Region, Myanmar. It the northernmost district of Yangon and contains Mingaladon Township and Shwepyitha Township. The district was created in 2022, being one of the new districts created from the former North Yangon District.

== Geography ==
Mingaladon District is home to the Yangon International Airport.

The open zoo Hlawga Park, which protects evergreen, mixed deciduous and swamp forest for environmental education, and the adjoining Hlawga Lake is located within the district.

It also has the Shwepyitha Industrial Zone, Yangon's first industrial park first developed in 1990.

== See also ==
- List of districts and neighborhoods of Yangon
