= University of Co-operative and Management, Thanlyin =

Public university in Yangon Division, Burma

Coordinates: 16°45′35.2″N 96°16′06.2″E

- သမဝါယမနှင့်စီမံခန့်ခွဲမှုပညာတက္ကသိုလ်(သန်လျင်)
- Other name: Yangon Co-operative University
- Motto: "Youth Co-operators today, Leaders in Future."
- Type: Public
- Rector: Yi Yi Win
- Location: Thanlyin, Yangon, Myanmar
- Website: www.tcu.edu.mm

The University of Co-operative and Management, Thanlyin is a public university in the Thanlyin township of Yangon Division, Myanmar.

The university offers a Bachelor of Business Science (B.B.Sc.) with five specializations, postgraduate diplomas (PGDip) and master's programmes. The university accepts 300 students annually for their four-year degree programmes.

The campus is eight miles (13 km) from the Yangon city center.

== Affiliations ==
The university is a part of the Southeast Asian Social Innovative Network (SEASIN), a European Commission-funded project that seeks to promote social innovation in consortium with 15 partners, including University of Alicante, Glasgow Caledonian University, University of Aveiro, Thammasat University, Ashoka Thailand, Mith Samlanh, and Social Innovation Exchange, amongst others.

== History ==
On May 19, 1994, the government of Myanmar established the Yangon Co-operative Regional College by virtue of Notification Number 10/94. The college opened its doors on June 21, 1994. It was renamed Yangon Co-operative Degree College on June 32, 1996. During the academic year of 2012–2013, it was upgraded to a Co-operative University (Thanlyin).

== Academic departments ==
- Department of Economics
- Department of Commerce
- Department of Statistics
- Department of Management Studies
- Department of Co-operative Studies
- Department of ICT
- Department of Burmese
- Department of English
- Department of Mathematics
- Department of Law
- Department of Economic Geography

== Degrees and diplomas ==
The university offers a bachelor's programme for Business Science (B.B.Sc.) with five specialisations:

- B.B.Sc. (Accounting & Finance)
- B.B.Sc. (Applied Statistics)
- B.B.Sc. (Marketing Management)
- B.B.Sc. (Regional Development)
- B.B.Sc. (Social Enterprise Management)

The university also offers postgraduate diploma courses in these specialisations. Additionally, the following master's programmes are offered by the university:

- Master of Accounting and Finance
- Master of Applied Statistics
- Master of Marketing Management
- Master of Regional Development
- Master of Social Enterprise Management
