= Bago River =

River in Lower Burma

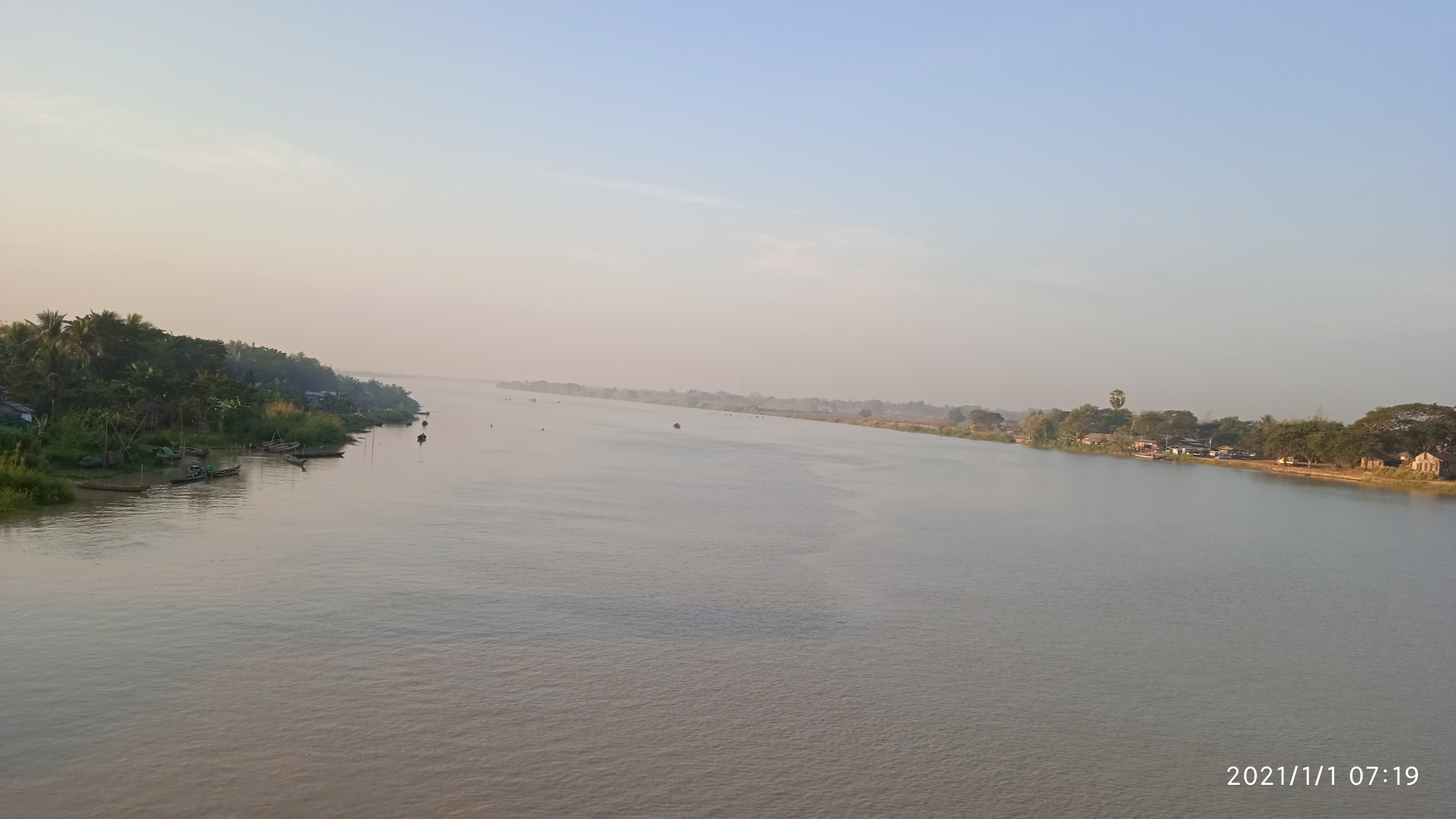
- Native name: Burmese: ပဲခူးမြစ်

Location
- Country: Myanmar
- Region: Bago; Yangon
- Townships: Gyobingauk; Kyauktaga; Letpadan; Bago; Kawa; Hlegu; Thanlyin; Dagon Seikkan; Thaketa; Dawbon; Botahtaung
- Cities: Bago; Yangon; Thanlyin

Physical characteristics
- Source: Sinhnamaung Mountain, Gyobingauk Township, Bago, Myanmar
  - coordinates: 18°23′50″N 95°55′1″E
  - elevation: 800 m (2,600 ft) (approximately)
- 2nd source: Dawe Dam and Reservoir, Letpadan Township, Bago, Myanmar
  - coordinates: 17°45′20″N 96°11′46″E
  - elevation: 80 m (260 ft) (approximately)
- Mouth: Yangon River
  - location: Monkey Point, Yangon, Myanmar
  - coordinates: 16°45′57″N 96°11′48″E
  - elevation: 1 m (3.3 ft)
- Length: 331 km (206 mi)
- Basin size: 3,220 km^{2} (1,240 sq mi)
- Width
  - average: 150 m (490 ft)
  - maximum: 1,200 m (3,900 ft)
- Discharge
  - location: Yangon River

Basin features
- Progression: Bago River→ Yangon River→ Andaman Sea
- Tributaries
  - left: Zalataw Creek; Pazundaung Creek
  - right: Bago-Sittaung Canal

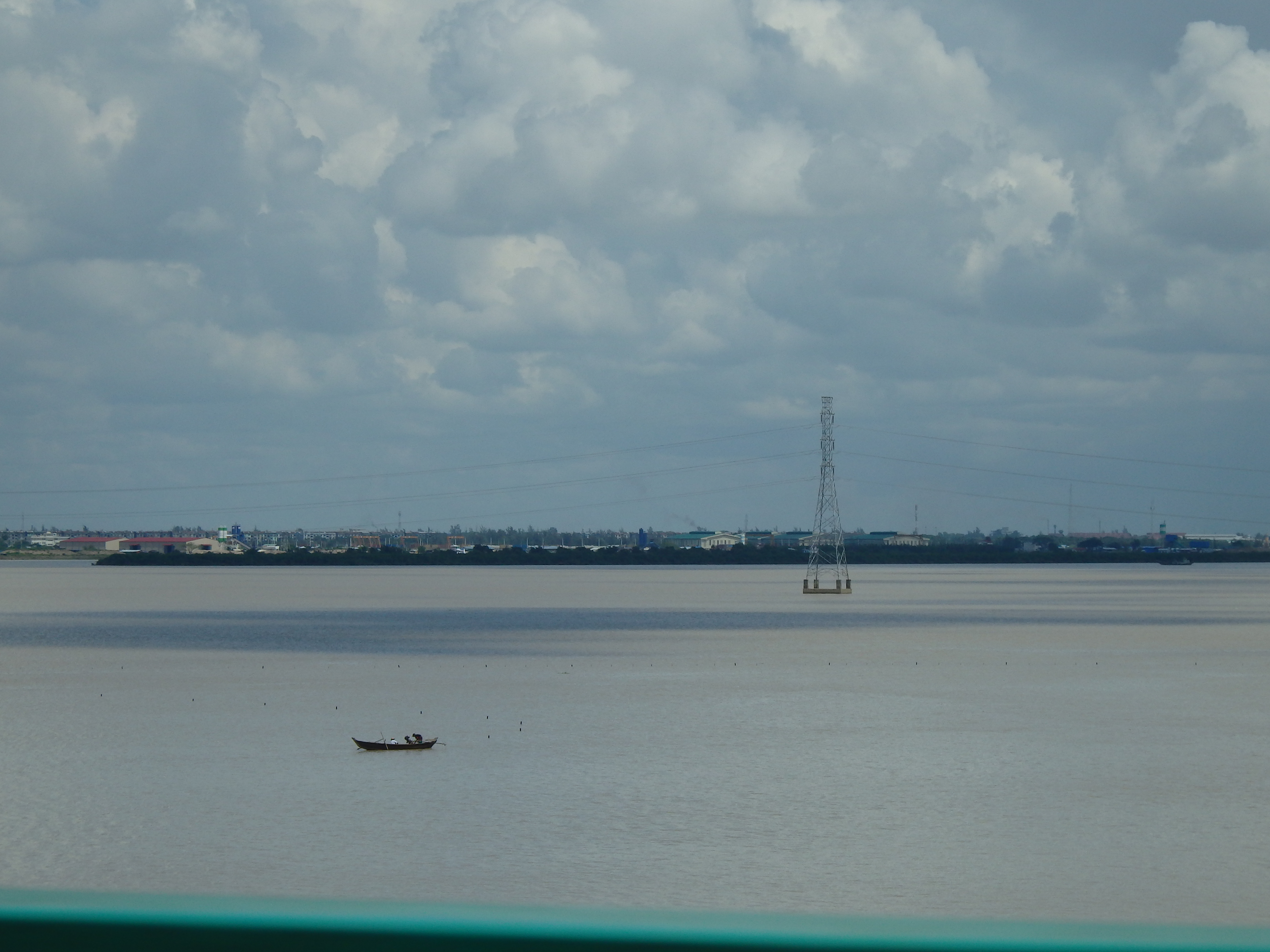
Bago River as seen from the Thanlyin Bridge

Bago River (Burmese: ပဲခူးမြစ်; Pegu River) is a river of southern Myanmar. It flows through Bago and Yangon, joining the Yangon River south of downtown Yangon.

The source of the Bago river comes from many streams in the hills of the Pegu Range with the traditional choice for the source being Sinhnamaung Mountain in Letpadan Township. Modern hydrological surveys find streams further north in Phyu Township that feed into the Bago River Basin. The Bago River flows into Yangon Region meeting the Yangon River at Monkey Point, Botahtaung Township, below which the river is called the Yangon River.

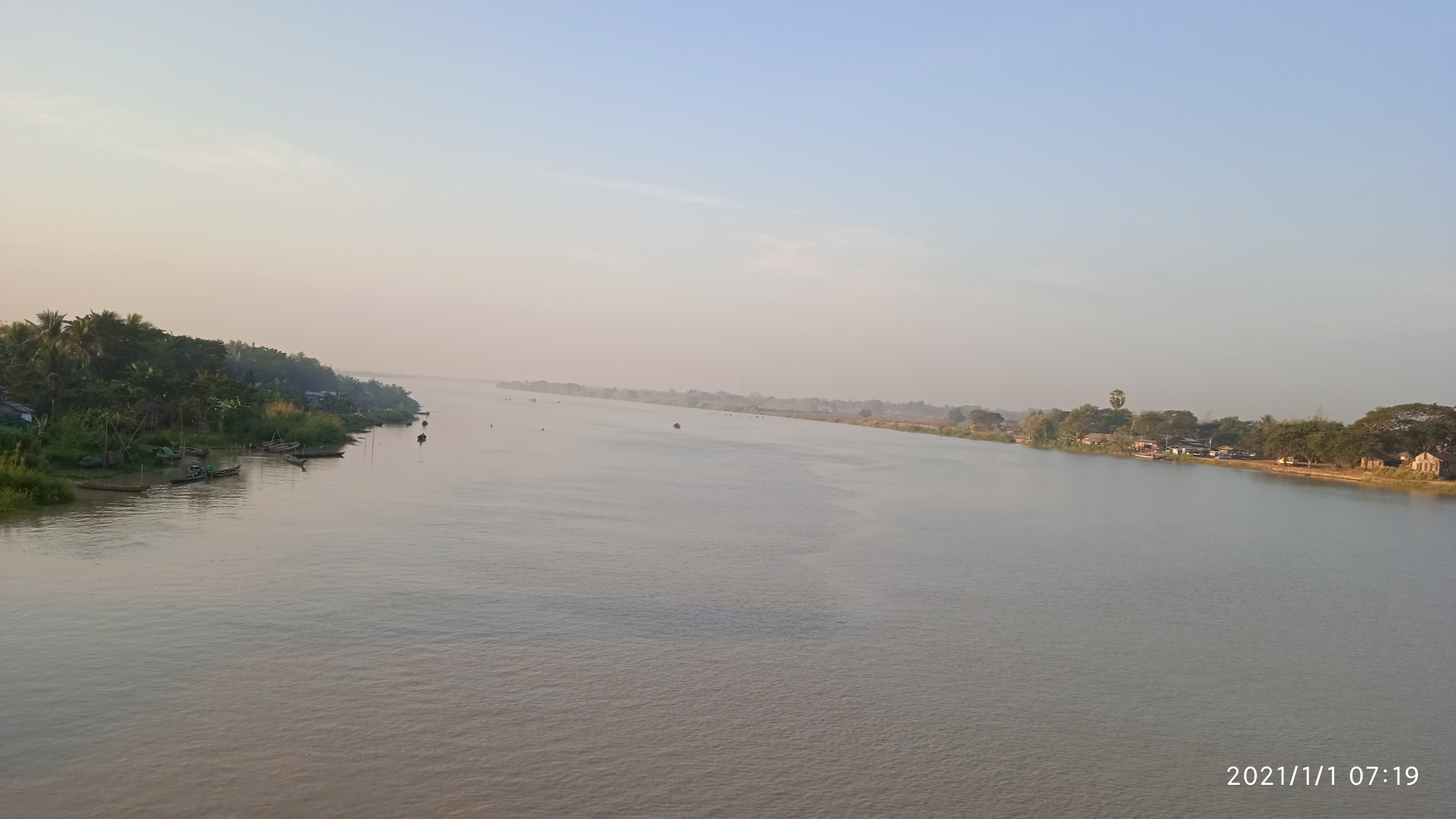
Bago River further upstream

In 1608, the Portuguese mercenary Filipe de Brito e Nicote, known as Nga Zinka to the Burmese, plundered the Shwedagon Pagoda. His men took the 300-ton Great Bell of Dhammazedi using elephants and forced labour. De Brito's intention was to take the bell across the Bago river to melt it down to make cannons. But the bell's weight proved too heavy for the raft, which broke and the bell went to the bottom of the river.

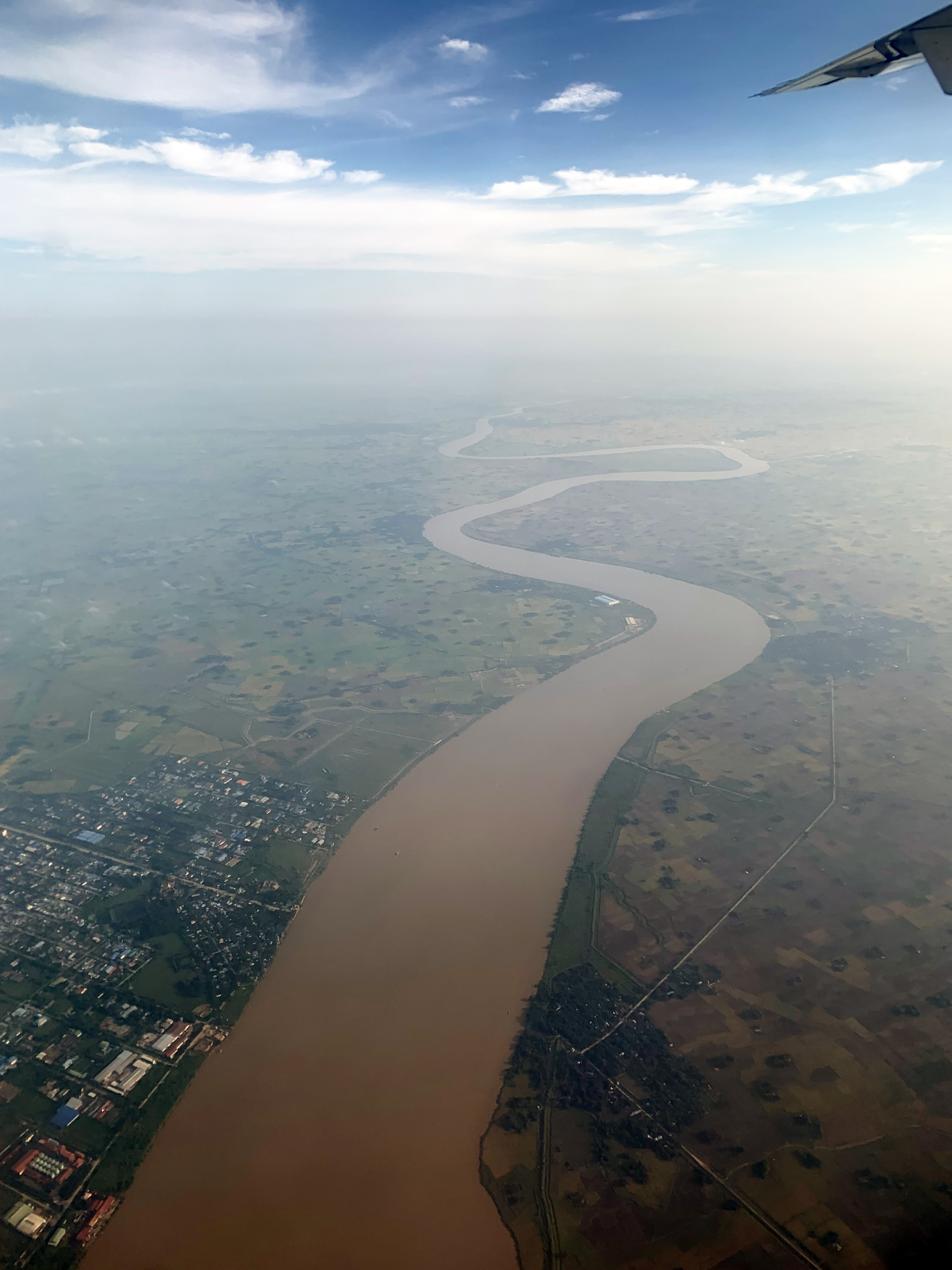
Aerial image of Bago River near Thayet Pin Chaung

Many people have tried to find the bell in the murky waters of the river, so far without success. Professional deep sea diver James Blunt has made 115 exploratory dives, using sonar images of objects in the area for guidance. To this date, it has not been recovered. Several Myanmar divers have died looking for it, including two navy divers who were trapped in a nearby wreck. The bell has since become an object of national superstition believing the search to be cursed and the bell's retrieval to be the key to the nation's rise out of poverty
