= Thanlyin Bridge 2 =

Thanlyin Bridge သန်လျင် တံတား အမှတ် (၂)
- Coordinates: 16°49′25″N 96°16′59″E
- Carries: 2 lanes, 2 pedestrian walk lanes
- Crosses: Bago River
- Locale: Yangon and Thanlyin
- Official name: Thanlyin Bridge
- Maintained by: Ministry of Transportation

Characteristics
- Total length: 4,540 ft (1,380 m)
- Width: 84 ft (26 m)
- Clearance above: 130 ft (40 m)

History
- Construction start: 2003

Statistics
- Daily traffic: unknown
- Toll: unknown

Thanlyin Bridge No. 2 (Burmese: သန်လျင် တံတား အမှတ် (၂) is a bridge that link the cities of Thanlyin and Yangon in Myanmar. The 1.38 km (0.86 mi) bridge link the Dagon Seikkan township on the Yangon side and the Kalawe village on the Thanlyin side. The motorway on it is 22 metres (72 ft) wide, flanked by 1.83 m (6 ft 0 in) pedestrian lanes. The clearance is 39.6 metres (130 ft) wide and 5.5 metres (18 ft) high. Its maximum loading capacity is 75 tons.

The bridge will extend Highway 2 to Thanlyin.
