= Hlegu =

Hlegu လှည်းကူး
- Town
- Location within Myanmar
- Coordinates: 17°05′43″N 96°13′16″E
- Country: Myanmar
- Region: Yangon Region
- District: Hlegu District
- Township: Hlegu Township

Area
  - Total: 1.78 sq mi (4.6 km^{2})

Population (2023)
  - Total: 9,933
  - Density: 5,580/sq mi (2,150/km^{2})
- Time zone: UTC6:30 (MMT)
- Area code: 1

Hlegu (Burmese: လှည်းကူး, pronounced [l̥ɛ́ɡú]) is the capital of Hlegu District in northern Yangon Region, Myanmar about 45 km north-east of Yangon city. It is located on both sides of the Ngamoyeik River. Hlegu is also the administrative seat of Hlegu Township and has five urban wards.
