= Letpadan =

Letpadan (လက်ပံတန်း)
- Town
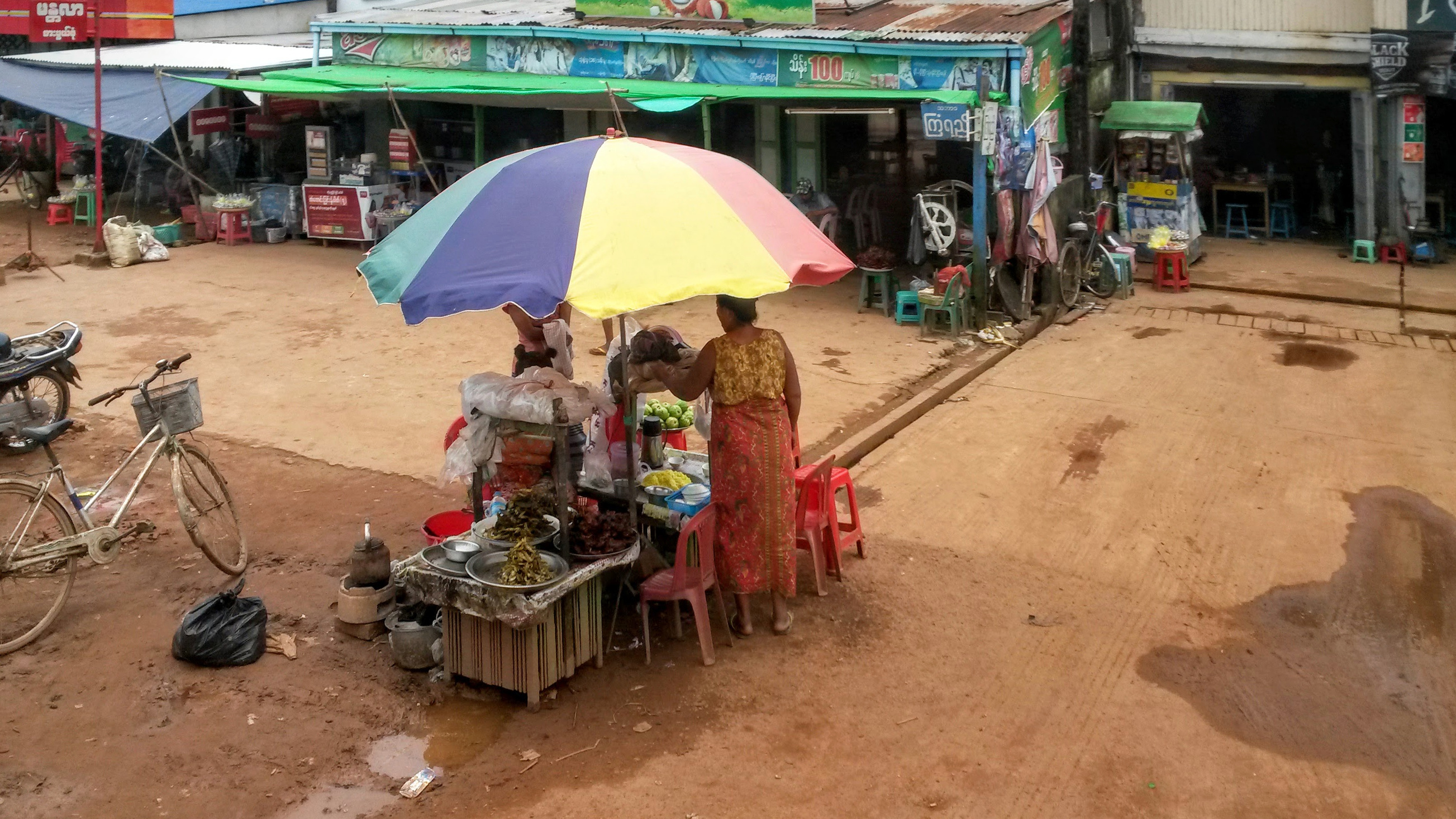
- Letpadan market

- Location in Burma
- Coordinates: 17°47′11.9″N 95°45′02.7″E
- Country: Myanmar
- Region: Bago Region
- District: Tharrawaddy
- Township: Letpadan
- Time zone: UTC+6.30 (MST)
- Area code: 54

Letpatan or Letpadan is a town in Tharrawaddy District, Bago Region in Myanmar. It is the administrative seat of Letpadan Township.
