= Thanlyin =

Thanlyin သန်လျင်မြို့
- City
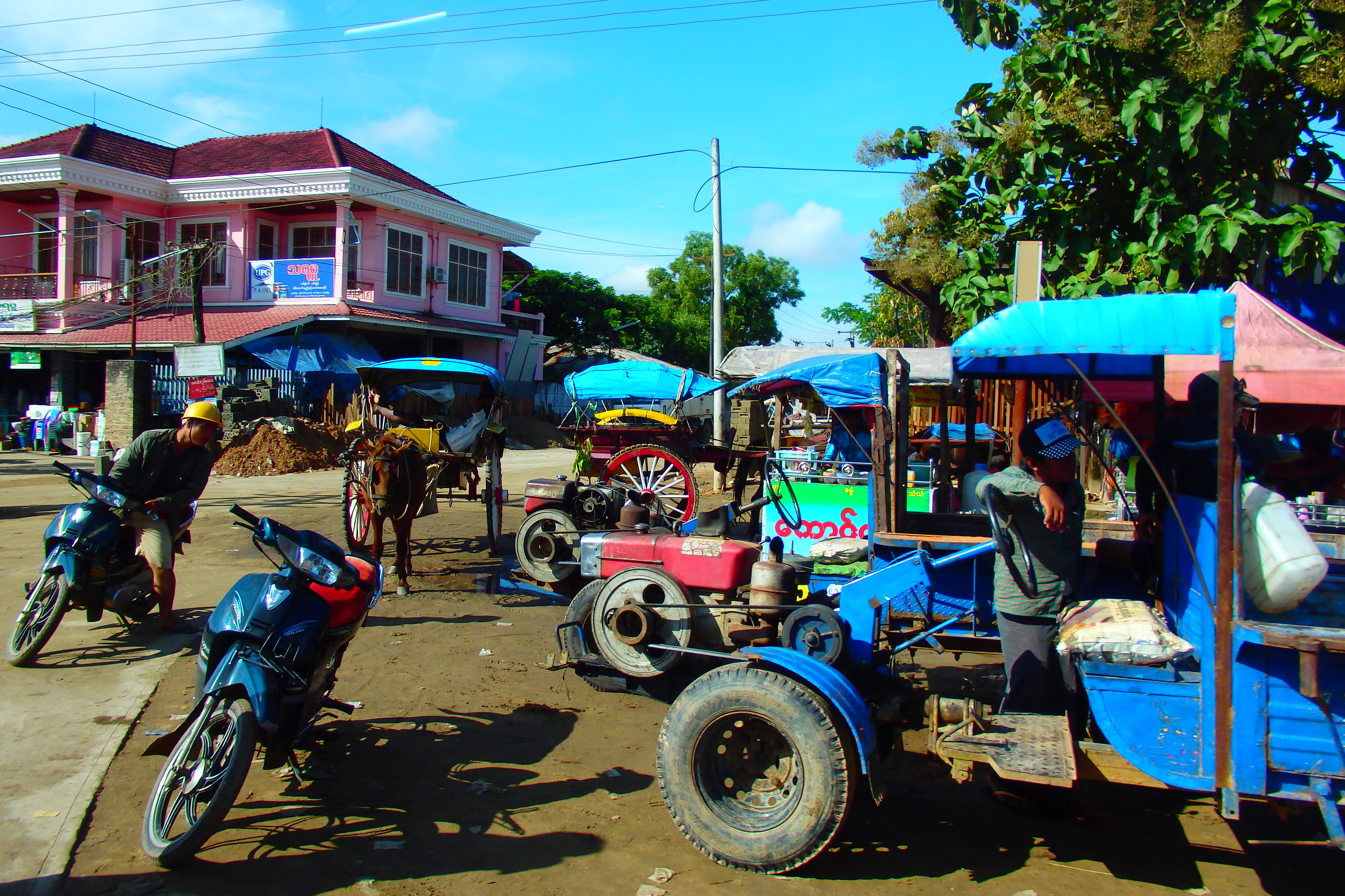
- Street in downtown Thanlyin

- Location within Myanmar
- Coordinates: 16°44′0″N 96°15′0″E
- Country: Myanmar
- Region: Yangon Region
- District: Thanlyin District
- Township: Thanlyin Township

Area
  - Total: 350.49 km^{2} (135.324 sq mi)

Population (2023)
  - Total: 78,667
  - Density: 224.45/km^{2} (581.32/sq mi)
- Time zone: UTC6:30 (MST)
- Postal codes: 11291-11293
- Area codes: 1 (mobile: 80, 99)

Thanlyin (Burmese: သန်လျင်မြို့, MLCTS: san lyang mrui.; pronounced [təɲɪ̀ɰ̃ mjo̰] or [θàɰ̃ljɪ̀ɰ̃ mjo̰]; Mon: ဍုၚ်သြေၚ်, [seaŋ]; formerly Syriam) is a major port city of Myanmar, located across Bago River from the city of Yangon. Thanlyin comprises 17 quarters and the surrounding Thanlyin Township is home to the largest port in the country, Thilawa Port, as well as the Thilawa Special Economic Zone and various prominent universities. Thanlyin is an urban area of Yangon Region, Myanmar, and a special economic center.

== History ==
Thanlyin became a prominent port city during the Hanthawaddy Kingdom when the port of Bago became silted in the 15th century. In 1599, the city was conquered by the Kingdom of Mrauk U's Portuguese mercenaries. The leader of the mercenaries Filipe de Brito e Nicote was made governor of the city. However, in 1603, De Brito declared independence, and after defeating the invading Arakanese navy in 1604 and 1605, successfully established Portuguese rule over Syriam (or Sirião in Portuguese) under the Portuguese viceroy of Goa. Ten years later, Anaukpetlun of the restored Taungoo dynasty retook the city, and executed de Brito by impalement.

Thanlyin remained the major port of the Taungoo kingdom until the mid-18th century. In the 1740s, Thanlyin was made the base of the French East India Company for their help in the Mon's reestablishment of Hanthawaddy Kingdom. The arrangement lasted until 1756 when King Alaungpaya of Konbaung dynasty captured the city. From then on, the importance has shifted to Yangon across the river, which Alaungpaya founded just a year earlier.

Thanlyin became part of the British Empire in 1852 after the Second Anglo-Burmese War. The British made the city into the oil refinery center of the country in the early 20th century to process the oil shipped from central Burma. The refinery was destroyed during World War II. The Thanlyin refinery was rebuilt in 1957, and underwent expansion in 1979 with Japanese assistance. In 1979 a pipeline was completed between Syriam and the Mann oilfield.

Since the 1990s, the city has undergone major changes. Thanlyin was finally connected to Yangon by road in 1993 when the Thanlyin Bridge was built. In the late 1990s, Thilawa Port was built to handle the container ships away from Yangon's ports. The city's population has increased from 43,000 in 1983 to 123,000 in 1996. As of 2023, the town had a population of 78,667 people.

== Transport ==
Thanlyin is connected to the country's highway network. The Thanlyin Bridge carries Highway 6, which links Yangon with the Thilawa port and the Thanlyin Industrial Zone. The Thanlyin Bridge 2, under construction since 2003, will link Thanlyin to Highway 2, the Yangon-Mandalay highway. River ferries to the Irrawaddy delta over the Twante Canal are available from Yangon's passenger ports.

== Economy ==
Thilawa Port, located just 8 miles (13 km) from the town's centre. is the largest deep water sea port in the country, and handles the majority of the shipped imports and exports to/from the country.

== Education ==
Thanlyin's metro area is home to Myanmar Maritime University, one of the most selective universities in Burma. Since the early 2000s, students from Thanlyin and surrounding suburbs have to attend local universities: the University of East Yangon for liberal arts and sciences, Technological University, Thanlyin for engineering and Co-operative University, Thanlyin for business. All four universities are located just outside the boundaries of Thanlyin town itself.

== Points of interest ==
- Kyaik Khauk Pagoda

== See also ==
- Almandine
