= Letpadan Township =

Township in Bago Region, Myanmar

Coordinates: 17°47′05″N 95°44′53″E

Letpadan လက်ပတန်းမြို့
- Township
- Location in Thayarwaddy district
- Country: Myanmar
- Region: Bago Region
- District: Tharrawaddy District
- Capital: Letpadan

Population (2014)
  - Total: 177,407
- Time zone: UTC+6.30 (MMT)

Letpatan Township (Burmese: လက်ပတန်းမြို့နယ်) is a township in Tharrawaddy District in the Bago Region of Myanmar. The principal town is Letpadan.

About 200 students and supporters of the movement against Education Law were crushed down by police at Letpadan on 10 March 2015 after they had been blocked on their way to Yangon for nine days by police. Over 100 were arrested after being attacked brutally by police force.
