= Taikkyi =

Town in Yangon Region, Myanmar

Taikkyi တိုက်ကြီးမြို့
- Town
- Location within Myanmar
- Coordinates: 17.3137°N 95.964°E
- Country: Myanmar
- Region: Yangon Region
- District: Taikkyi District
- Township: Taikkyi Township
- Established: 29 December 1908

Area
  - Total: 10.68 sq mi (27.7 km^{2})

Population (2023)
  - Total: 86,697
  - Density: 8,118/sq mi (3,134/km^{2})
- Time zone: UTC+6:30 (MMT)

Taikkyi (Burmese: တိုက်ကြီးမြို့) is the capital town of Taikkyi District in northern Yangon Region, southern Myanmar. On 30 April 2022, it became the capital of its own district when the North Yangon District was reorganised.

The town was first recognised as a city during British Burma on 29 December 1908. Taikkyi is made of eight wards and grew as a station on the Yangon–Pyay Railway. The town's tourist attractions include the Kyeik Pun Thar Lun Pagoda, the Min Kyaung monastery and a large goldfish pond.

Taikkyi is made of eight quarters: Inngalar, Shanzu, Oakponezu, Bawdhigone, Mingalar, Bootar, Odann, Zay. The two main high schools in Taikkyi are BEHS-Taikkyi and BEHS (Myoma)-Taikkyi.
