= Hmawbi =

Town in Yangon Region, Myanmar

Hmawbi Township မှော်ဘီ
- Town
- Hmawbi
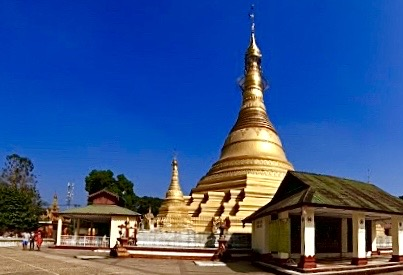
- Shwe Maw Tin Pagoda in Hmawbi

- Location in Myanmar
- Coordinates: 17.10°N 96.03°E
- Country: Myanmar
- Region: Yangon Region
- District: Hmawbi District
- Township: Hmawbi Township

Area
  - Total: 6.09 sq mi (15.8 km^{2})

Population (2023)
  - Total: 25,713
  - Density: 4,220/sq mi (1,630/km^{2})
- Time zone: UTC+6:30 (Myanmar Standard Time)

Hmawbi (Burmese: မှော်ဘီ) is the principal town of Hmawbi Township near the Yangon River in northern Yangon Region, southern Myanmar. On 30 April 2022, it became the capital of the new Hmawbi District when the North Yangon District was reorganised.

The town has four urban wards.

Hmawbi Air Base is nearby.

== Climate ==
Climate data for Hmawbi (2000–2024)
Month	Jan	Feb	Mar	Apr	May	Jun	Jul	Aug	Sep	Oct	Nov	Dec	Year
Mean daily maximum °C (°F)	32.8 (91.0)	35.0 (95.0)	37.0 (98.6)	38.0 (100.4)	34.6 (94.3)	31.0 (87.8)	30.3 (86.5)	30.1 (86.2)	31.2 (88.2)	32.7 (90.9)	33.5 (92.3)	32.4 (90.3)	33.2 (91.8)
Daily mean °C (°F)	24.3 (75.7)	26.1 (79.0)	28.7 (83.7)	30.8 (87.4)	29.6 (85.3)	27.7 (81.9)	27.2 (81.0)	27.1 (80.8)	27.6 (81.7)	28.1 (82.6)	27.3 (81.1)	25.0 (77.0)	27.5 (81.5)
Mean daily minimum °C (°F)	15.9 (60.6)	17.2 (63.0)	20.5 (68.9)	23.5 (74.3)	24.5 (76.1)	24.3 (75.7)	24.1 (75.4)	24.0 (75.2)	24.0 (75.2)	23.5 (74.3)	21.2 (70.2)	17.5 (63.5)	21.7 (71.1)
Average precipitation mm (inches)	6.3 (0.25)	3.7 (0.15)	11.0 (0.43)	28.6 (1.13)	275.2 (10.83)	502.1 (19.77)	570.7 (22.47)	527.1 (20.75)	371.8 (14.64)	164.9 (6.49)	51.4 (2.02)	5.2 (0.20)	2,518 (99.1)
Average precipitation days (≥ 1.0 mm)	0.5	0.4	0.8	1.8	13.5	24.7	26.2	25.7	21.4	11.9	2.9	0.4	130.2
Source: World Meteorological Organization
