= Hlegu District =

Hlegu Township Hlegu District လှည်းကူးမြို့နယ် လှည်းကူးခရိုင်
- Township and District
- Hlegu District in Yangon Region
- Coordinates: 17°14′0″N 96°14′0″E
- Country: Myanmar
- Region: Yangon Region
- District: Hlegu District
- Capital: Hlegu

Area
  - Total: 222.749 sq mi (576.918 km^{2})

Population (2023)
  - Total: 269,377
  - Density: 1,209.33/sq mi (466.924/km^{2})
- Time zone: UTC6:30 (MMT)
- Area code: 1

Hlegu Township (Burmese: လှည်းကူး မြို့နယ်, pronounced [l̥ɛ́ɡú mjo̰nɛ̀]) is the only township in Hlegu District (Burmese: လှည်းကူးခရိုင်) in northern Yangon Region, Myanmar. It is northeast of the city Yangon and is largely rural. The township only has one town: the principal town of Hlegu, which has five urban wards. The rural portion of the township contains 168 villages grouped into 57 village tracts. In April 2022, the township was promoted to become its own district, splitting off from North Yangon District.

The township's Paunglin Dam and Ngamoeyeik Reservoir supply water to over 28,300 hectares (70,000 acres) of farmland between Hlegu and Mingaladon, and nearly 340 million liters (90 million gallons) of water a day to the people living in Yangon. The township is prone to flooding from the Ngamoeyeik River and Bago River. In 2014, floods affected 3000 people in the villages of Ngwenanthar, Malit, Sinhpon, Sitpinmyauk and Yaekyaw villages. Blockages in drainage systems also caused severe flooding in Tadagyi village in rural Hlegu Towsnhip.

The new Yangon–Mandalay Expressway cuts through the township.

== Borders ==
Hlegu township shares borders with Hmawbi Township and Taikkyi Township in the west, Bago Township of Bago Region in the north and east, North Okkalapa Township, North Dagon Township and East Dagon Township in the south.
