= University of West Yangon =

Liberal arts and sciences university in Myanmar

Coordinates: 16°56′50″N 96°00′54″E

West Yangon University (WYU)
- ရန်ကုန် အနောက်ပိုင်း တက္ကသိုလ်
- Motto: To develop the knowledge for benefit of the country
- Type: Government
- Established: 27 June 2002; 24 years ago
- Rector: Khin Thider
- Students: 22,448 (2019)
- Undergraduates: BA, BSc, BA (Hons;), BSc (Hons;)
- Postgraduates: MA, MSc, MRes
- Location: Htantabin 11393; Yangon Division, Myanmar
- Website: www.wyu.edu.mm

The West Yangon University (Burmese: ရန်ကုန် အနောက်ပိုင်း တက္ကသိုလ် [jàɰ̃ɡòʊɰ̃ ʔənaʊʔpáɪɰ̃ tɛʔkəθò]), located in Htantabin, Yangon Division, is a liberal arts and sciences public university in Myanmar. The university offers bachelor's and master's degrees in liberal arts and science. Students who wish to pursue post-graduate (especially PhD) studies typically go to Yangon University.

== Degrees ==
Classified as an Arts and Science university in the Burmese university education system, West Yangon University offers bachelor's and master's degree in common liberal arts and sciences disciplines. Its ordinary Bachelor of Arts (BA) and Bachelor of Science (BSc) take four years to complete, honours degrees BA (Hons) and BSc (Hons) take five years and master's degrees MA, MSc and MRes take seven and eight years.

Program	Bachelor's	Master's	Doctorate	Head of the Department
Myanmar	BA, BA (Hons;)	MA, MRes		Daw Khin Pale
English	BA, BA (Hons;)	MA	PhD	Mi Mi Gyee
Geography	BA, BA (Hons;)	MA		Daw Khin Mya Thway
History	BA, BA (Hons;)	MA, MRes		Thida Myint
Philosophy	BA, BA (Hons;)	MA, MRes		Thet Thet Naing
Oriental Studies	BA, BA (Hons;)	MA, MRes		Kyu Kyu Hla
Geology	BSc, BSc (Hons;)	MSc		Myo Thant
Botany	BSc, BSc (Hons;)	MSc, MRes		Myat Thida
Chemistry	BSc, BSc (Hons;)	MSc, MRes		Hlaing Hlaing Oo
Mathematics	BSc, BSc (Hons;)	MSc, MRes	PhD	Dr. Moe Thuzar
Physics	BSc, BSc (Hons;)	MSc, MRes		Dr Tin Tin Win
Zoology	BSc, BSc (Hons;)	MSc,		Thet Thet Win
Industrial Chemistry	BSc, BSc (Hons;)	MSc, MRes		Khin Htwe Nyunt
Law	LLB (UDE)			
