= Shwepyitha Township =

Township in Yangon, Myanmar

Shwepyitha Township ရွှေပြည်သာ မြို့နယ်
- Township
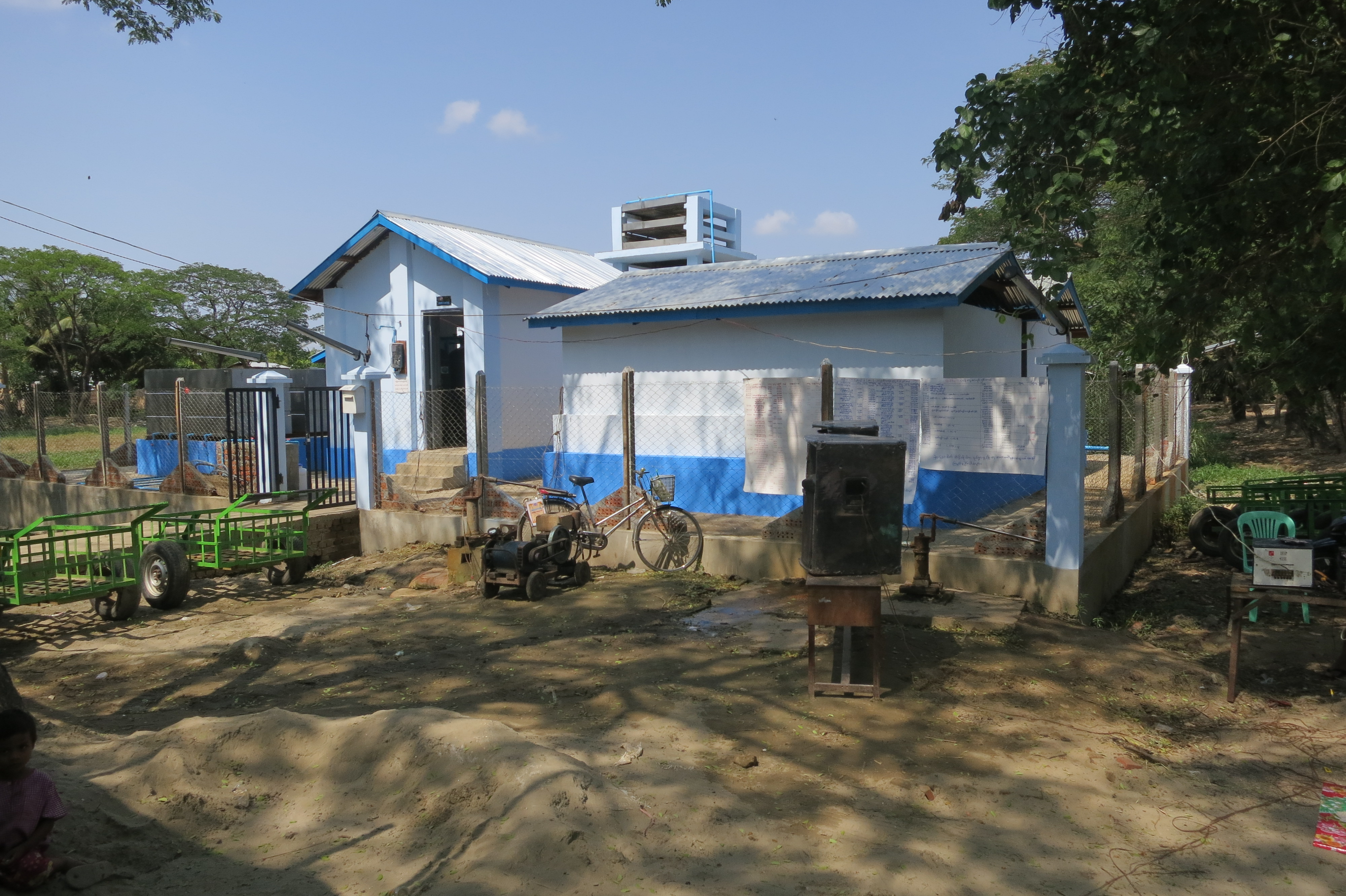
- A water treatment facility in Shwepyitha

- Location within Myanmar
- Coordinates: 16°58′10″N 96°4′41″E
- Country: Myanmar
- Region: Yangon Region
- City: Yangon
- District: Mingaladon District
- Settled: 1986

Area
  - Total: 25.76 sq mi (66.7 km^{2})

Population (2019)
  - Total: 284,922
  - Ethnic groups: Bamar:93.896%; Rakhine:2.026%; Kayin:1.994%; Chin:0.609%; Mon:0.543%; Shan:0.176%; Kachin:0.119%; Kayah:0.022%; Foreigners:0.612%
- Time zone: UTC6:30 (MMT)
- Postal codes: 11411
- Area codes: 1 (mobile: 80, 99)

Shwepyitha Township (Burmese: ရွှေပြည်သာ မြို့နယ်; pronounced [ʃwèpjìθà mjo̰nɛ̀]) is located in the northwestern part of Yangon, Myanmar. The township comprises 27 wards and 3 village tracts, and shares borders with Htantabin Township to the north, Mingaladon Township to the east, the Yangon river to the west, and Insein Township to the south.

== Geography ==
Incorporated into the city of Yangon in 1986, Shwepyitha is now developing and has basic municipal services. Improvements include tidy and broad main roads and many streets form a grid. Hlaing River separates Shwepyitha and Hlaingtharyar. Shwepyitha Bridge was built in 1996, and now it is a useful bridge in Yangon and is also the start of the Yangon-Pathein-Chaungthar Highway. Htan Chauk Pin Junction is regarded as the centre of Shwepyitha and many well-known places are there. Bogyoke Aungsan Road, Bayint Naung Road, and No. 4 Highway are the most popular roads in the town. The Yangon Circular Railway passes through the township. Its railway station is also at the Yangon-Pyay-Mandalay Railway.

== Economy ==
The township has the Shwepyitha Industrial Zone, Yangon's first industrial park, first developed in 1990. The Industrial Zone was expanded in 1999 to Zone 2 and Zone 3. As of 2001, all 306.9 acres (124.2 ha) of Zone 1 was sold and developed. Zone 2 remained at 35% developed, while Zone 3's 194 acres (79 ha) were also all sold out. In 2022, the Shwepyitha Industrial Zone 1 employed about 50,000 workers at 200 factories. By then it was only one of 29 total indsturial zones in the Yangon metropolitan area.

== Education ==
The township has 50 primary schools, 20 middle schools, and 7 high schools. The most famous high schools are B.E.H.S. No. 1 and B.E.H.S No. 3. There are nearly 30 middle (branch) schools and 10 high (branch) schools. Private schools include Kaung Su San, Aung Thukha, New Life, Myint Mo Yape, Education Palace, etc. University of Computer Studies, Yangon and Government Technical Institute ( Shwepyitha) are located there, too.

Many Language Centres teach English, Korean, Japanese, and Chinese.

== Demographics ==
Ethnic composition of Shwepyitha Township
Ethnic group	Percentage
Bamar	93.826%
Rakhine	2.026%
Karen	1.994%
Chin	0.609%
Mon	0.544%
Shan	0.176%
Kachin, Kayah, Others	0.825%
Source: 2019 GAD township report

The Bamar make up the vast majority of the township's population, while the Rakhine and Karen are notable minority groups.
