= Hlawga Park =

Open zoo in Myanmar

Hlawga National Park
- Burmese: လှော်ကားအမျိုးသားဥယျာဉ်
- IUCN category IV (habitat/species management area)
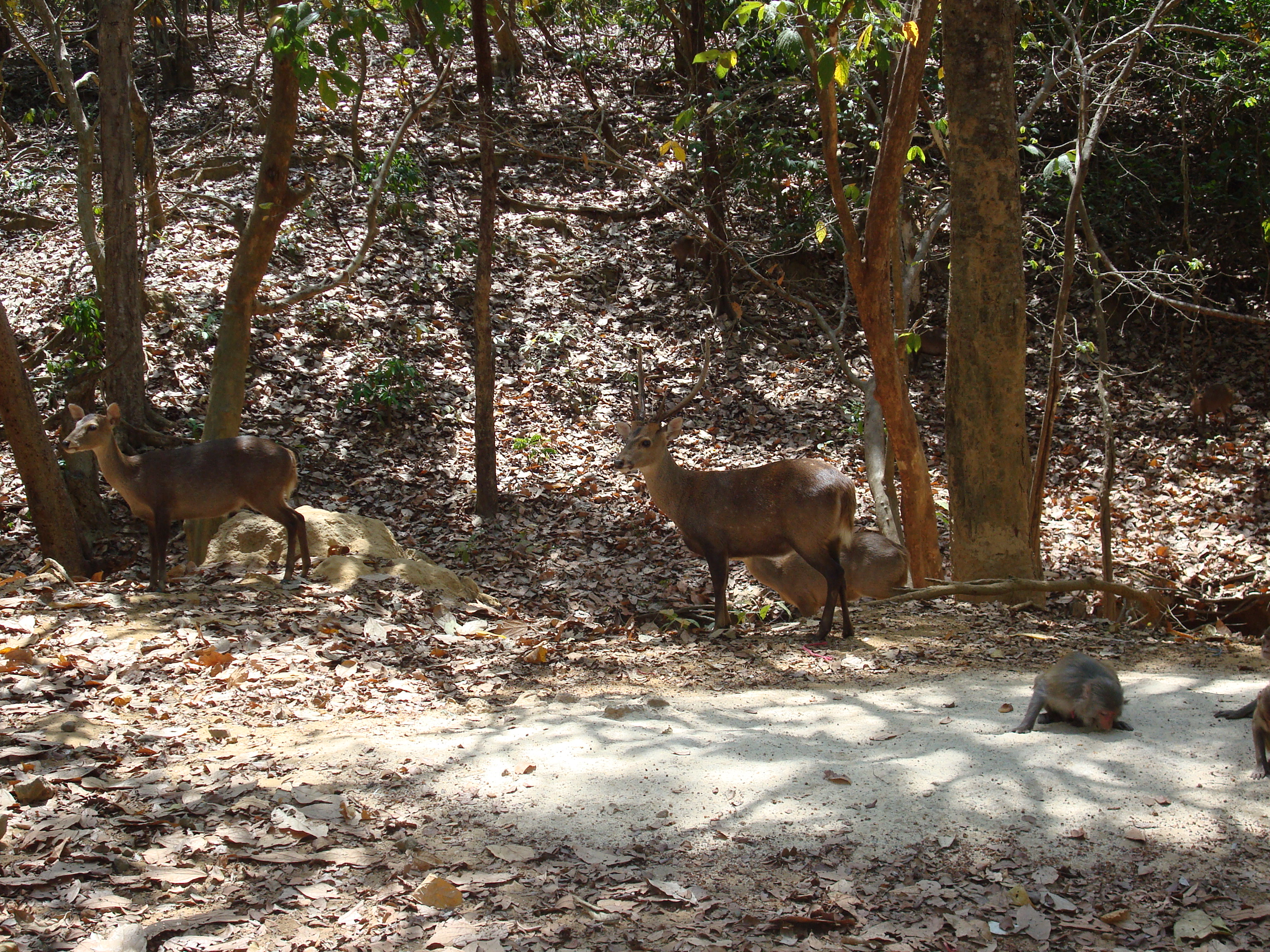

- Location within Myanmar
- Location: Mingaladon Township, Yangon, Myanmar
- Nearest city: Yangon
- Coordinates: 17°00′17″N 96°06′44″E
- Area: 6.23 km^{2} (2.41 sq mi)
- Established: 1982
- Governing body: Ministry of Environmental Conservation and Forestry
- Website: www.hlawgapark.com

Hlawga Park is an open zoo covering 6.23 km^{2} (2.41 sq mi) that was established in 1982. It was created to protect evergreen, mixed deciduous and swamp forest and for environmental education. Located in Mingaladon Township, it is jointly managed by the Nature and Wildlife Conservation Division and private enterprises. The nature park is located on the outskirts of Yangon and includes an 818-acre (3.31 km^{2}) wildlife park, a 62-acre (0.25 km^{2}) mini-zoo and a 660-acre (2.7 km^{2}) buffer zone.

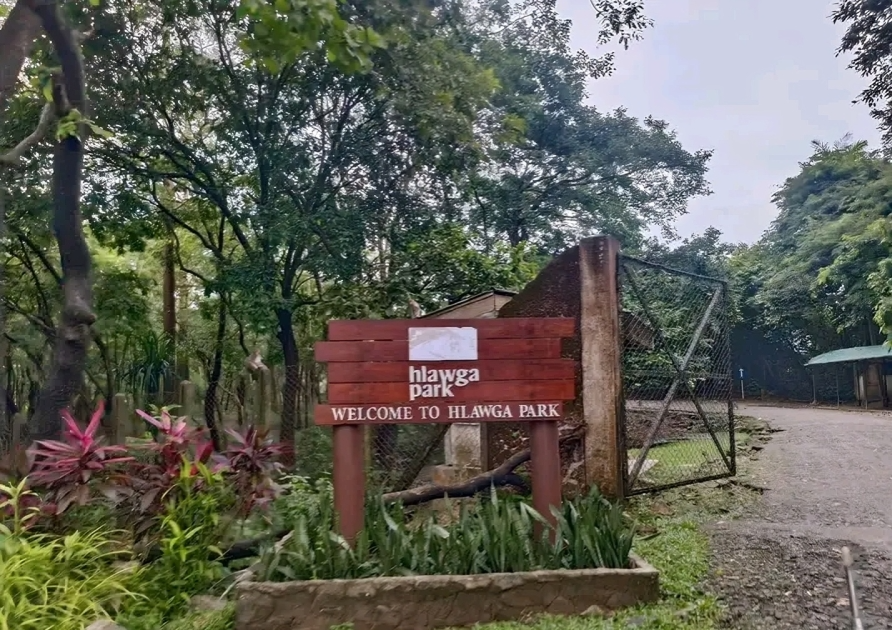
Entry to the Hlawga Park

== History ==
The park embraces the catchment area of the Zokanabe Lake, an extension dam built in 1921–24 to reinforce the greater Hlawga Lake which has supplied water to Yangon since 1904. The park was established in 1982 with joint funding by the UNDP and the Burmese government in order to protect the forests and vegetative cover in the catchment of Hlawga Lake, and to establish a representative collection of Burmese indigenous wildlife species of mammals, reptiles and birds, in their natural habitats.

== Wildlife ==
=== Flora ===
The evergreen forest contains at least 295 species of plants. Common species are dipterocarps and Lagerstroemia speciosa. Also found are deciduous species such as teak (Tectona grandis) and binga (Mitragyna rotundifolia), and medicinal plants such as sindonma-nwe (Tinospora cordifolia).

=== Mammals ===
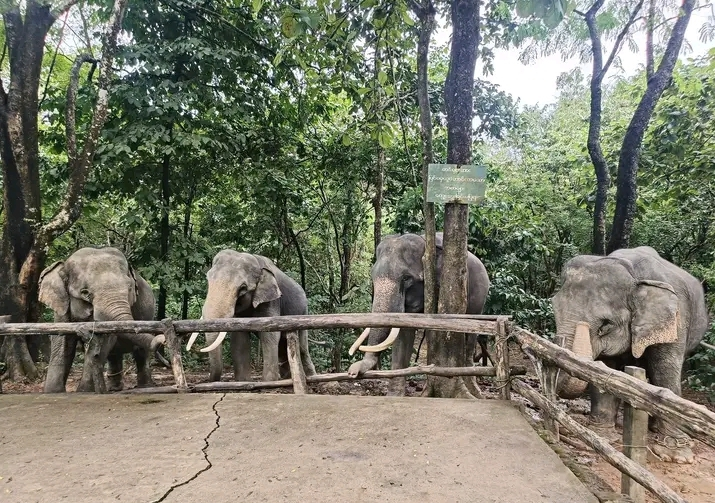
Asiatic elephants in the park

The 818-acre (3.31 km^{2}) wildlife park is home to eld's deer, hog deer, barking deer, sambar deer, and rhesus macaque, pythons, and pangolin. Their natural habitats consists of semi-evergreen forests, mixed deciduous forests, and swamp forests. According to a 1992 survey, the park was home to at least 21 species of mammals, 145 species of birds and 8 species of reptiles. Barking deer, hog deer and wild boar are the most common mammal species. Slow lores, pangolin and a few species of jungle cats used to roam the park at night feeding on figs, which is abundantly found in the park. The semi-evergreen type of vegetation creates ideal habitats for a variety of reptiles from monitor lizards to cobra, and krait (Bungarus fasciatus) to pythons (Python reticulatus).

=== Birds ===
Resident and migratory birds are abundant inside the park. Identified species include: the jungle fowl (Gallus gallus), red-vented bulbul (Pycnonotus cafer), lesser whistling duck (Dendrocygna javanica), Asian openbill stork (Anastomus oscitans), black-crowned night heron (Nycticonax nycticorax) and white-throated babbler (Turdoides gularis).

== Activities ==
Visitors can go on a safari-style bus ride or an elephant ride through the park, hiking on jungle trails, boating on the lake, and/or bird watching. However, most local visitors use the park's picnic areas.

The park is divided into three zones: a rest and retreat zone, an adventure and recreation zone, and an education and hobby zone. The rest and retreat zone features forest eco-lodges, boat houses and a health spa resort. The adventure and recreation zone has facilities for jungle trekking, bird watching and wildlife safaris, as well as a camping ground and training areas for mountain climbing and parachuting. The education and hobby zone includes a timber species display center, a butterfly park, an insect kingdom, a reptile park and fishing spots.

== Climate ==
Located in coastal Yangon Division, the park has a monsoonal climate. Annual average rainfall is about 95 inches (2,400 mm) most of which is received between late May and October. The coolest months are from November to February (average high: 32 °C (90 °F) and average low: 18 °C (64 °F)) and the hottest months are from March to May (average high: 37 °C (99 °F) and average min: 24 °C (75 °F)). The mean relative humidity is 87%.
