= Mingaladon Township =

Township of Yangon, Myanmar

Mingaladon Township မင်္ဂလာဒုံ မြို့နယ် Mon: ဍုၚ်ဒြဲာမ္ၚဵု Mingalardon Township
- Township of Yangon
- Mingaladon Township
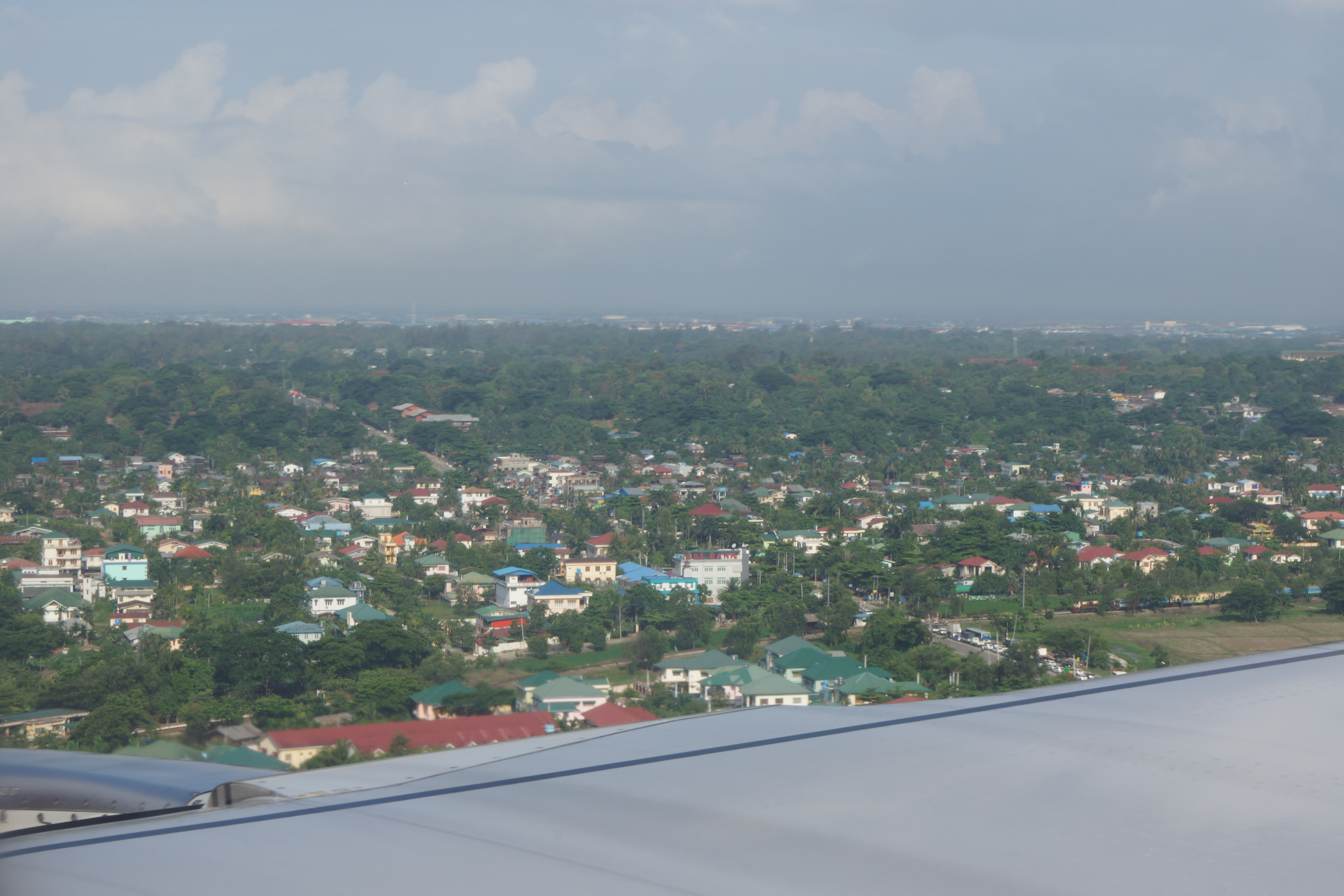
- Mingaladon from an aeroplane near Yangon Airport

- Location within Myanmar
- Coordinates: 16°54′26″N 96°08′0″E
- Country: Myanmar
- Region: Yangon Region
- City: Yangon
- District: Mingaladon District

Area
  - Total: 106.6 km^{2} (41.14 sq mi)
- Elevation: 9.1 m (30 ft)

Population (2000)
  - Total: 136,000
  - Density: 1,280/km^{2} (3,310/sq mi)
- Time zone: UTC6:30 (MMT)
- Postal codes: 11021
- Area code: 1 (mobile: n/a)

Mingaladon Township (Burmese: မင်္ဂလာဒုံ မြို့နယ် [mɪ̀ɰ̃ɡəlàdòʊɰ̃ mjo̰nɛ̀] Mon: ဍုၚ်ဒြဲာမ္ၚဵု) is located in the northernmost part of Yangon, Myanmar. The township comprises 31 wards, and shares borders with Hmawbi Township in the north, North Okkalapa Township in the east, Insein Township and Shwepyitha Township in the west, and Mayangon Township in the south. Mingaladon is still relatively undeveloped and lacks basic municipal services.

Mingaladon is home to the Yangon International Airport and the Hlawga National Park

== Etymology ==
The Burmese place name Mingaladon (မင်္ဂလာဒုံ) is a portmanteau of two words: Pali mangala ("blessed") and Mon ဍုၚ် ([dɜŋ], "town").

== Climate ==
Climate data for Mingaladon (1991–2020)
Month	Jan	Feb	Mar	Apr	May	Jun	Jul	Aug	Sep	Oct	Nov	Dec	Year
Mean daily maximum °C (°F)	32.6 (90.7)	34.7 (94.5)	36.5 (97.7)	37.4 (99.3)	34.2 (93.6)	31.0 (87.8)	30.4 (86.7)	30.1 (86.2)	31.0 (87.8)	32.3 (90.1)	33.0 (91.4)	32.2 (90.0)	32.9 (91.2)
Daily mean °C (°F)	25.2 (77.4)	27.0 (80.6)	29.1 (84.4)	30.8 (87.4)	29.5 (85.1)	27.7 (81.9)	27.3 (81.1)	27.1 (80.8)	27.5 (81.5)	28.1 (82.6)	27.7 (81.9)	25.7 (78.3)	27.7 (81.9)
Mean daily minimum °C (°F)	17.9 (64.2)	19.2 (66.6)	21.7 (71.1)	24.1 (75.4)	24.9 (76.8)	24.4 (75.9)	24.2 (75.6)	24.1 (75.4)	24.1 (75.4)	24.0 (75.2)	22.4 (72.3)	19.2 (66.6)	22.5 (72.5)
Average precipitation mm (inches)	4.7 (0.19)	2.5 (0.10)	11.8 (0.46)	39.6 (1.56)	283.8 (11.17)	512.9 (20.19)	579.1 (22.80)	519.8 (20.46)	389.4 (15.33)	195.4 (7.69)	57.4 (2.26)	3.5 (0.14)	2,599.9 (102.36)
Average precipitation days (≥ 1.0 mm)	0.4	0.2	0.8	2.4	14.5	25.9	26.7	26.5	21.4	14.0	3.4	0.4	136.6
Source: World Meteorological Organization

== Transport ==
Mingaladon's Aung Mingala Bus Terminal serves all the highway buses to all major cities and towns in the country, except for those in the Ayeyarwady Division.

== Mingaladon Air Base ==
Mingaladon is home to an air base (ICAO: VYHB) of the Myanmar Air Force, formerly called 502 Air Base.

== Education ==
The University of Computer Studies, Yangon, one of the country's best universities, is located in the western part of the township on the west bank of Hlawga National Park. The township is also home to the Defence Services Institute of Nursing and Paramedical Science.
