= Taikkyi District =

Taikkyi Township Taikkyi District တိုက်ကြီးမြို့နယ် တိုက်ကြီးခရိုင်
- Township and District
- Taikkyi District in Yangon Region
- Coordinates: 17°30′0″N 96°2′0″E
- Country: Myanmar
- Region: Yangon Region
- Districts of Myanmar: Taikkyi District
- Township: Taikkyi

Area
  - Total: 1,832.5 km^{2} (707.5 sq mi)

Population (2023)
  - Total: 288,214
  - Density: 157.28/km^{2} (407.35/sq mi)
  - Ethnicities: Bamar; Karen
  - Religions: Buddhism; Christianity; Islam; Hinduism
- Time zone: UTC6:30 (MMT)
- Area codes: 1 (mobile: 80, 99)

Taikkyi Township (Burmese: တိုက်ကြီး မြို့နယ် [taɪʔtɕí mjo̰nɛ̀]) is the northernmost township of Yangon Region and the only township of Taikkyi District (Burmese: တိုက်ကြီးခရိုင်). The township was split off from North Yangon District on 30 April 2022 to form its own district.

The township has 3 towns, the principal town of Taikkyi as well as Oakkan and Aphauk, which altogether have 20 urban wards. The rural portion of the township has 476 villages grouped into 75 village tracts.

Taikkyi grew due to its location on the Yangon-Pyay railway. Outside of the town of Taikkyi is the Gyobyu Reservoir, which has a capacity of 27 million gallons and is one of the major reservoirs providing the water supply for the city of Yangon. Near the reservoir is the natural Phugyi Lake, with a capacity of 54 million gallons, which forms part of the city's reservoir system. Myaing Hay Wun Elephant Park is also in this township.
