= Thilawa Port =

Largest port terminal in Myanmar

Myanmar International Terminals Thilawa
- Interactive map of Myanmar International Terminals Thilawa
- Location within Myanmar
- Native name: မြန်မာ အပြည်ပြည်ဆိုင်ရာ ဆိပ်ကမ်း သီလဝါ (Burmese)

Location
- Country: Myanmar (Burma)
- Location: Yangon
- Coordinates: 16°39′41″N 96°15′27″E

Details
- Operated by: Myanmar International Terminals Thilawa
- Owned by: Hutchison Port Holdings
- Draft depth: 10 meters

Statistics
- Website www.mitt.com.mm

Myanmar International Terminals Thilawa (Burmese: မြန်မာ အပြည်ပြည်ဆိုင်ရာ ဆိပ်ကမ်း သီလဝါ, abbreviated MITT), also known as the Yangon Port International Terminal or Thilawa Port, is a deep river port on the Yangon River, 16 kilometres (9.9 mi) south of downtown Yangon in Myanmar. Thilawa Port is the largest port terminal in Myanmar and, alongside the Port of Yangon, is one of the two main ports of Yangon.

== Geography ==
The facility is adjacent to the Thilawa Special Economic Zone in Thanlyin-Kyauktan area immediately south of Yangon.

== Operating capacity ==
The international multi-purpose container port can operate 24 hours a day, seven days a week. The port can handle up to 7,300 ships per year.

Thilawa Port has a draft of 10 meters and can handle ships of up to 20,000 tons with up to 2,000 TEUs. The port was expanded in early 2020, with a lower previous draft of 9 meters and a capacity of ships weighing up to 15,000 tons with up to 1,500 TEUs.

== Management ==
Thilawa Port is wholly owned by Hutchison Port Holdings and is operated by the private Hong Kong–based Myanmar International Terminal Thilawa company.

== See also ==
- Transport in Myanmar
