= Yangon Region =

Administrative region of Myanmar

Yangon Region ရန်ကုန်တိုင်းဒေသကြီး Rangoon Region
- Region
- Yangon Region
- Flag Seal
- Nickname: YGN
- Location of Yangon Region
- Coordinates: 17°0′N 96°10′E
- Country: Myanmar
- Region: Lower Myanmar
- Financial capital: Yangon

Government
  - Chief Minister: Aung Naing Thu
  - Cabinet: Yangon Region Government
  - Legislature: Yangon Region Hluttaw
  - Judiciary: Yangon Region High Court

Area
  - Total: 10,276.7 km^{2} (3,967.9 sq mi)
  - Rank: 14th
- Highest elevation (Aukchin Taung): 484 m (1,588 ft)

Population (2019 Census)
  - Total: 7,360,703
  - Rank: 1st
  - Density: 716.252/km^{2} (1,855.08/sq mi)
- Demonym: Yangonite

Demographics
  - Ethnicities: Bamar, Kayin, Rakhine, Chinese, Indians, Mon
  - Religions: Buddhism, Christianity, Hinduism, Islam
- Time zone: UTC+6:30 (MST)
- ‘Area code(s)': 01
- ISO 3166 code: MM
- Literacy rate (2019): ▲99.98%
- HDI (2022): ▲0.802; Very high · 1st
- Website: yangon.gov.mm

Yangon Region (Burmese: ရန်ကုန်တိုင်းဒေသကြီး, MLCTS: rankun tuing desa. kri:, pronounced [jàɰ̃ɡòʊɰ̃ táɪɰ̃ dèθa̰ dʑí]; formerly Rangoon Division and Yangon Division) is a first-level administrative division of Myanmar. Located in lower Myanmar, the region is bordered by Bago Region to the north and east, the Gulf of Martaban to the south, and Ayeyarwady Region to the west. Yangon Region is dominated by its capital city of Yangon, the former national capital city and the largest city in the country. Other important cities are Thanlyin and Twante. The region is the most developed region of the country and the main international gateway. The division measures 10,170 km^{2} (3,930 sq mi).

== History ==
The region was historically populated by the Mon. Politically, the area was controlled by Mon kingdoms prior to 1057, and after 1057, with few exceptions, by Burman kingdoms from the north. The control of the region reverted to Pegu-based Mon kingdoms in the 13th to 16th centuries (1287–1539) and briefly in the 18th century (1740–57). The Portuguese were in control of Thanlyin (Syriam) and the surrounding area from 1599 to 1613.

For centuries, Thanlyin was the most important port city in Lower Myanmar until the mid-18th century when King Alaungpaya chose to enlarge a small village across the river near the great Shwedagon Pagoda named Dagon.

The British first captured Yangon in the First Anglo-Burmese War (1824–26) but returned it to Burmese administration after the war. The British seized Yangon and all of Lower Burma in the Second Anglo-Burmese War of 1852, and subsequently transformed Yangon into the commercial and political hub of British Burma. Yangon was the capital of British Burma and Hanthawaddy Province, which covered today's Yangon and Bago divisions. The British brought in many Indians to serve as workers and civil servants. By the 1930s, the Indians made up half of Yangon city, and only one-third was Burmese.

Between World War I and World War II, Yangon was the center of the Burmese nationalist movement. Many future Burmese political figures such as Aung San, U Nu, U Thant and Ne Win were all one-time Rangoon University students. Yangon Region was under Japanese occupation between April 1942 and May 1945.

After Myanmar gained independence from the United Kingdom in January 1948, the Hanthawaddy Province was renamed Pegu (Bago) Division, with Yangon as its capital. In 1964, the Rangoon Division was split from the Pegu Division. The capital of Pegu Division was changed from Rangoon to Pegu. In June 1974, Hanthawaddy (Hongsavatoi) and Hmawbi townships were transferred from Pegu Division to Rangoon Division.

Post-war Yangon grew tremendously. Successive Burmese governments built satellite towns near Yangon. Today, Yangon Region is essentially the Greater Yangon metropolitan area surrounded by a hollow rural hinterland.

== Administrative divisions ==
There were only four districts in Yangon Region. On 30 April 2022, the provisional government expanded the number of districts to 14. Of the 45 townships in the region, the city of Yangon now encompasses 33 townships.

Districts of Yangon as of 2022

District	Townships
Taikkyi District	Taikkyi Township
Hlegu District	Hlegu Township
Hmawbi District	Hmawbi Township • Htantabin Township
Mingaladon District	Mingaladon Township • Shwepyitha Township
Insein District	Insein Township • Hlaingthaya Township (East) • Hlaingthaya Township (West)
Thanlyin District	Thanlyin Township • Thongwa Township • Kyauktan Township • Kayan Township • Cocokyun Township
Twantay District	Twante Township • Kungyangon Township • Kawhmu Township • Seikkyi Kanaungto Township • Dala Township
Kyauktada District	Kyauktada Township • Pabedan Township • Lanmadaw Township • Latha Township • Dagon Township
Ahlon District	Ahlon Township • Kyeemyindaing Township • Sanchaung Township
Mayangon District	Mayangon Township • Hlaing Township • North Okkalapa Township
Thingangyun District	Thingangyun Township • South Okkalapa Township • Tamwe Township • Yankin Township
Botahtaung District	Botataung Township • Dawbon Township • Mingala Taungnyunt Township • Pazundaung Township • Thaketa Township
Dagon Myothit District	Dagon Seikkan Township • South Dagon Township • North Dagon Township • East Dagon Township
Kamayut District	Kamayut Township • Bahan Township

== Government ==
=== Executive ===
The Yangon Region Government is the regional government, led by the Chief Minister of Yangon Region. It is responsible for administering and governing Yangon Region. Until 2026, the region government was not in operation with the region instead being governed by the SAC, following the 2021 coup d'état .

=== Legislative ===
The Yangon Region Hluttaw is the region's legislature, responsible for local governance, passing regional laws, approving localized budgets, and overseeing the region cabinet. It has 123 seats and is unicameral. The latest election for the Yangon Region Hluttaw concluded in 2026.

=== Judiciary ===
The Yangon Region High Court is the region's highest-level court.

== Demographics ==
Historical population
Year	Pop.	±%
1973	3,190,359	—
1983	3,973,626	+24.6%
2014	7,360,703	+85.2%
Source: 2014 Myanmar Census

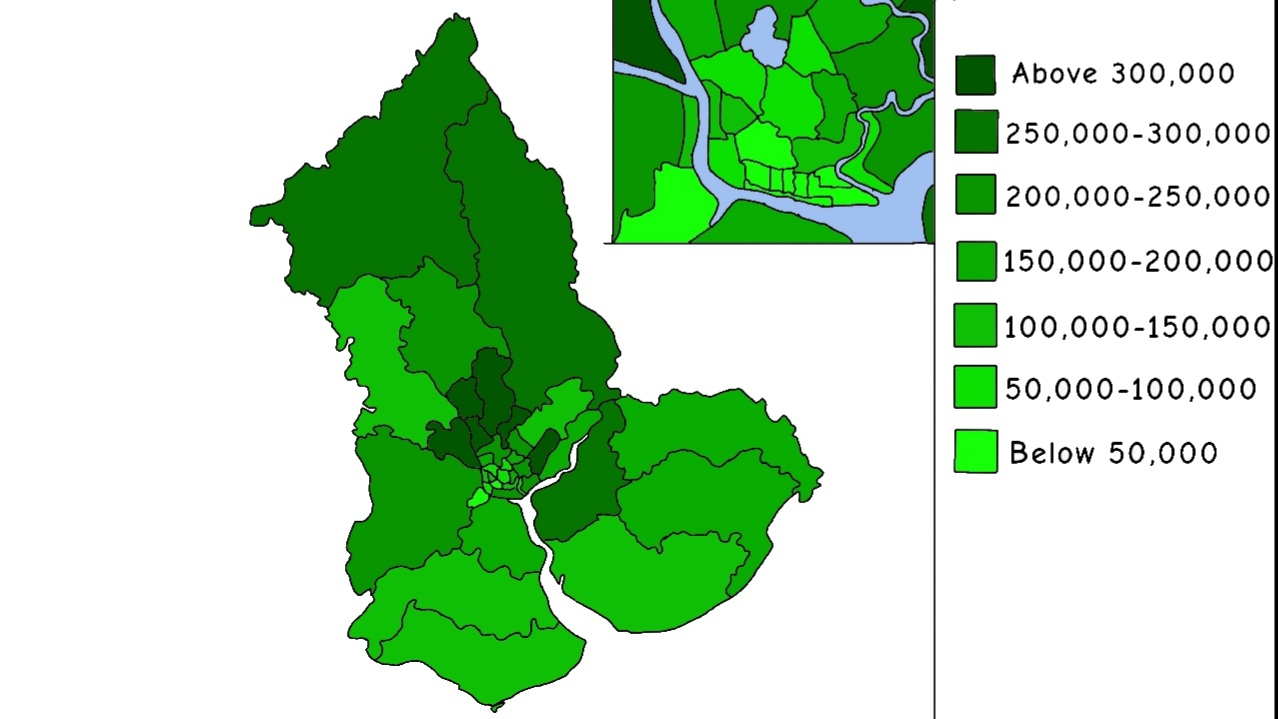
Population of each township as of 2014

According to the 2014 census report, the population of Yangon Region is 7.36 million. Burmese is the primary language used by Burmese of all ethnic backgrounds. English is the main second language among the urban elite of Yangon.

=== Ethnicity ===
Ethnic composition of Yangon Region
Ethnic group	Percentage
Bamar	89.0%
Other	5.8%
Karen	3.9%
Rakhine	1.3%
Source: 2019 GAD township reports

The Bamar make up the majority of the region's population. The region is also home to a large number of South Asians (mainly Indians) and Burmese Chinese, in addition to Karen and Rakhine communities.

After the 2014 Census in Myanmar, the Burmese government indefinitely withheld release of detailed ethnicity data, citing concerns around political and social concerns surrounding the issue of ethnicity in Myanmar. In 2022, researchers published an analysis of the General Administration Department's nationwide 2018-2019 township reports to tabulate the ethnic makeup of the region.

=== Religion ===
Religion in Yangon Region (2014)
1. Buddhism (91.0%)
2. Islam (4.70%)
3. Christianity (3.20%)
4. Hinduism (1.00%)
5. Other religion (0.10%)

According to the 2014 Myanmar Census, Buddhists make up 91% of Yangon Region's population, forming the largest religious community there. Minority religious communities include Muslims (4.7%), Christians (3.2%) and Hindus (1%). 0.1% of the population listed no religion, other religions, or were otherwise not enumerated.

According to the State Sangha Maha Nayaka Committee's 2016 statistics, 88,442 Buddhist monks were registered in Yangon Region, comprising 16.5% of Myanmar's total Sangha membership, which includes both novice samanera and fully-ordained bhikkhu. The majority of monks belong to the Thudhamma Nikaya (81.2%), followed by Shwegyin Nikaya (13.6%), with the remainder of monks belonging to other small monastic orders. 16,960 thilashin were registered in Yangon Region, comprising 28.1% of Myanmar's total thilashin community, the largest in Myanmar.

== Economy ==
Yangon Region is the most developed region in the country. According to the government's official statistics for FY 2010–2011, the size of the economy of Yangon Region was 8.93 trillion kyat, or 23% of the national GDP. Greater Yangon is Lower Myanmar's main trading hub for all kinds of merchandise – from basic food stuffs to used cars. Bayinnaung Market is the largest wholesale center in the country for rice, beans and pulses, and other agricultural commodities. Much of the country's legal imports and exports go through Thanlyin's Thilawa port, the largest and busiest port in Myanmar. At least 14 light industrial zones ring Yangon, employing thousands of workers. Outside Greater Yangon, rice farming remains predominant. Other important crops include jute, pulses, rubber, sugarcane, and groundnut.

== Transport ==
Yangon Region has the best transportation infrastructure in the country. All transport to and from the rest of the country (and the world) goes through Yangon. Five "highways" link Yangon to the rest of the country. (To be sure, the definition of highway is loosely used. Most highways are no more than two-lane roads.) Yangon International Airport is the main international gateway of the country. Yangon Central Railway Station is a major hub of the 5,068-kilometre (3,149 mi) Myanmar Railways system. Twante Canal, which links Yangon to Ayeyarwady Region, is also widely used for both transport and commerce.

As motor transportation is highly expensive for most people, buses are the main mode of transportation within the division or regions nearby. In January 2008, Yangon Region had nearly 182,000 motor vehicles, 17.7% of the country's total.

== Education ==
Although the city of Yangon has the best education facilities in the country, the educational facilities and opportunities available in the rest of Yangon Region are extremely poor. Many students in rural and poor districts do not finish middle school. According to official statistics, only about 23% of primary school students make it to high school. Most students are enrolled in the public school system. Private schools, which cost at least $8,000 a year in tuition per student, are strictly the preserve of the elite.

AY 2002-2003	Primary	Middle	High
Schools	2,245	240	158
Teachers	15,600	10,100	3600
Students	540,000	302,000	123,000

Nearly all of the division's universities are in Greater Yangon. Dagon University in North Dagon and the University of East Yangon in Thanlyin are among the largest undergraduate universities in the country. Yangon's University of Medicine 1, Yangon, University of Medicine 2, Yangon, Yangon Technological University and University of Computer Studies, Yangon are among the most selective universities in Myanmar.

The University of West Yangon in Htantabin and the Officers Training School in Hmawbi are two major institutions of higher education outside Greater Yangon.

== Health care ==
The general state of health care in Myanmar is poor. The military government spends anywhere from 0.5% to 3% of the country's GDP on health care, consistently ranking among the lowest in the world. Although health care is nominally free, in reality, patients have to pay for medicine and treatment, even in public clinics and hospitals. Public hospitals lack many of the basic facilities and equipment. Despite this, Yangon Region has the best medical facilities and personnel available in the country. The following is a summary of the public health system in the division, in the fiscal year 2002-2003.

2002–2003	# Hospitals	# Beds
Specialist hospitals	9	3,800
General hospitals with specialist services	8	3,220
General hospitals	26	1,055
Health clinics	24	384
Total	67	8,459
