= Kyaikthanlan Pagoda =

Tallest Buddhist Pagoda in Mon, Myanmar

- ကျိုက်သလ္လံစေတီ
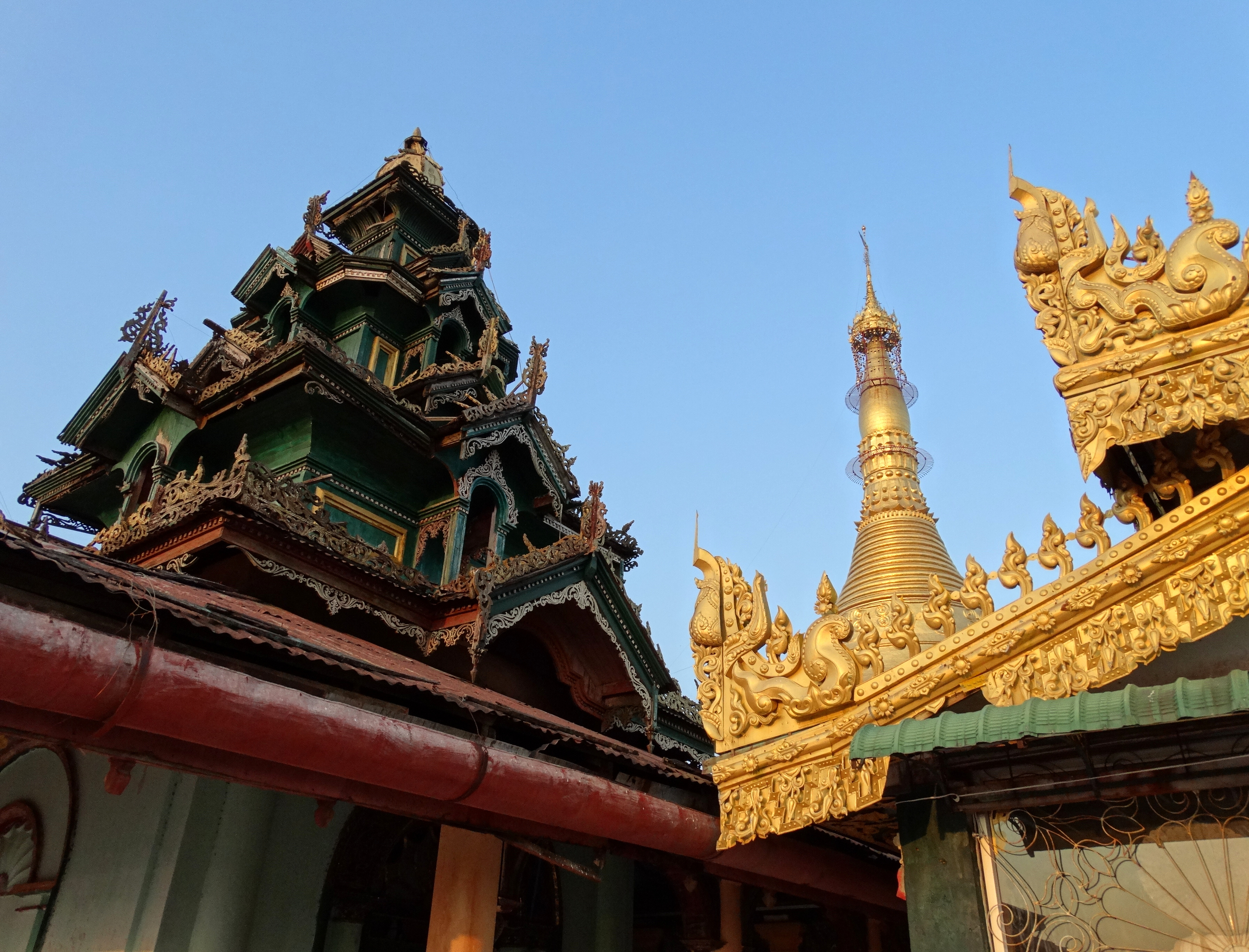

Religion
- Affiliation: Theravada Buddhism

Location
- Country: Mawlamyine, Mon State, Myanmar
- Interactive map of Kyaikthanlan Pagoda
- Coordinates: 16.489315°N 97.628556°E

The Kyaikthanlan Pagoda (Mon: ကျာ်သြင်လာန်; Burmese: ကျိုက်သလ္လံ စေတီ) is the tallest Buddhist pagoda in Mawlamyine, Mon State, Myanmar, standing at a height of 150 feet (46 metres).

Built in 875 AD during the reign of Mon King Mutpi Raja, the pagoda was raised from its original height of 56 feet (17 metres) to the present 150 feet (46 metres) by successive kings including Wareru, founder of the Hanthawaddy kingdom. In 1764 (1125 ME), General Maha Nawrahta of the Royal Burmese Army repaired the pagoda but couldn't finish it. In 1831, to prevent Moulmein's identity from fading away, Sitke Maung Htaw Lay, who later served as Magistrate of Moulmein, restored the pagoda with the funds raised by public subscriptions. Situated on a ridge of hills, the pagoda commands views of the city, nearby islands, Gulf of Martaban, surrounding rivers and the limestone mountains of Kayin State in the east. Rudyard Kipling is believed to have written his famous "Lookin' lazy at the sea" line from his poem "Mandalay" at this pagoda.

== See also ==
- Buddhism in Myanmar
- Kaylartha Pagoda
- Kyaikhtisaung Pagoda
- Kyaik Ne Yay Lae Pagoda
- Kyaiktiyo Pagoda
- Pa-Auk Forest Monastery
- Yadanabonmyint Monastery
- Zinkyaik Pagoda
