= Seindon Mibaya =

Seindon Mibaya Siripubbāratanadevī
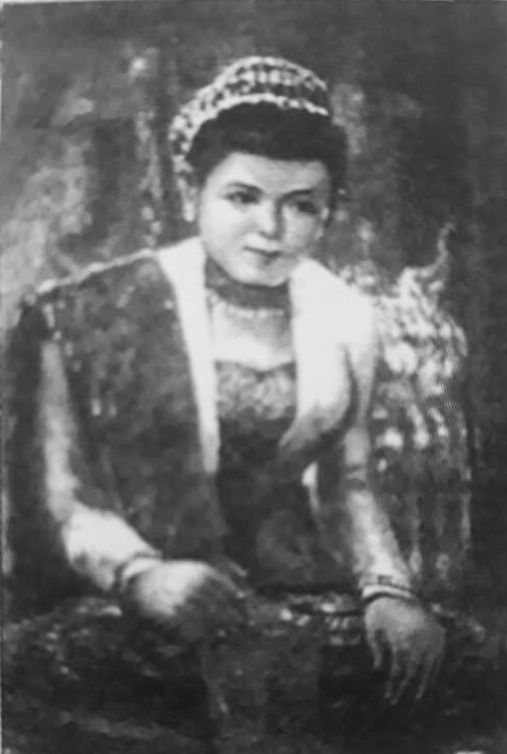

Mibaya of Seindon, Sale and Talok
- Tenure: ? – 1878
- Born: Shin Thet; 1840
- Died: 15 May 1905 (aged 64–65); Moulmein, British Burma
- Spouse: Mindon Min
- Issue: None
Regnal name
- Siripubbāratanadevī (သီရိပုဗ္ဗာရတနာဒေဝီ)
- House: Konbaung
- Religion: Theravada Buddhism

Seindon Mibaya (Burmese: စိန်တုံးမိဖုရား; 1840 – 15 May 1905), known by her royal title, Thiri Pobba Yadana Dewi (Pali: Siripubbāratanadevī), was a senior queen consort of King Mindon during the Konbaung dynasty of Burma. Being a cousin of King Mindon, she was promoted to a Nanzwe Mibaya (Note: King Mindon created a special position called Nanzwe Mibaya for his four queens– Yinge Mibaya, Laungshe Mibaya, Magway Mibaya and Seindon Mibaya. It's between Nanya Mibaya (first rank) and Ahsaungya Mibaya (second rank).) and received the appanage of Seindon (Note: Seindon was a viscountcy-level territory, present-day it's near Sagaing Bridge.) when he ascended the throne.

== Life ==
Seindon Mibaya was born as Shin Thet in 1840. She was the eldest daughter of Le-bo U Sai and Duchess of Ahrlarkatpa, the younger sister of Chandra Mata Mahe, Queen of the South Royal Chamber, who was the mother of King Mindon. Therefore, she was a maternal cousin of King Mindon. She had a younger sibling, Tabe Prince. She was granted the appanages of Sale and Ta Lok Myo when she became the queen consort. She did not bear any issue.

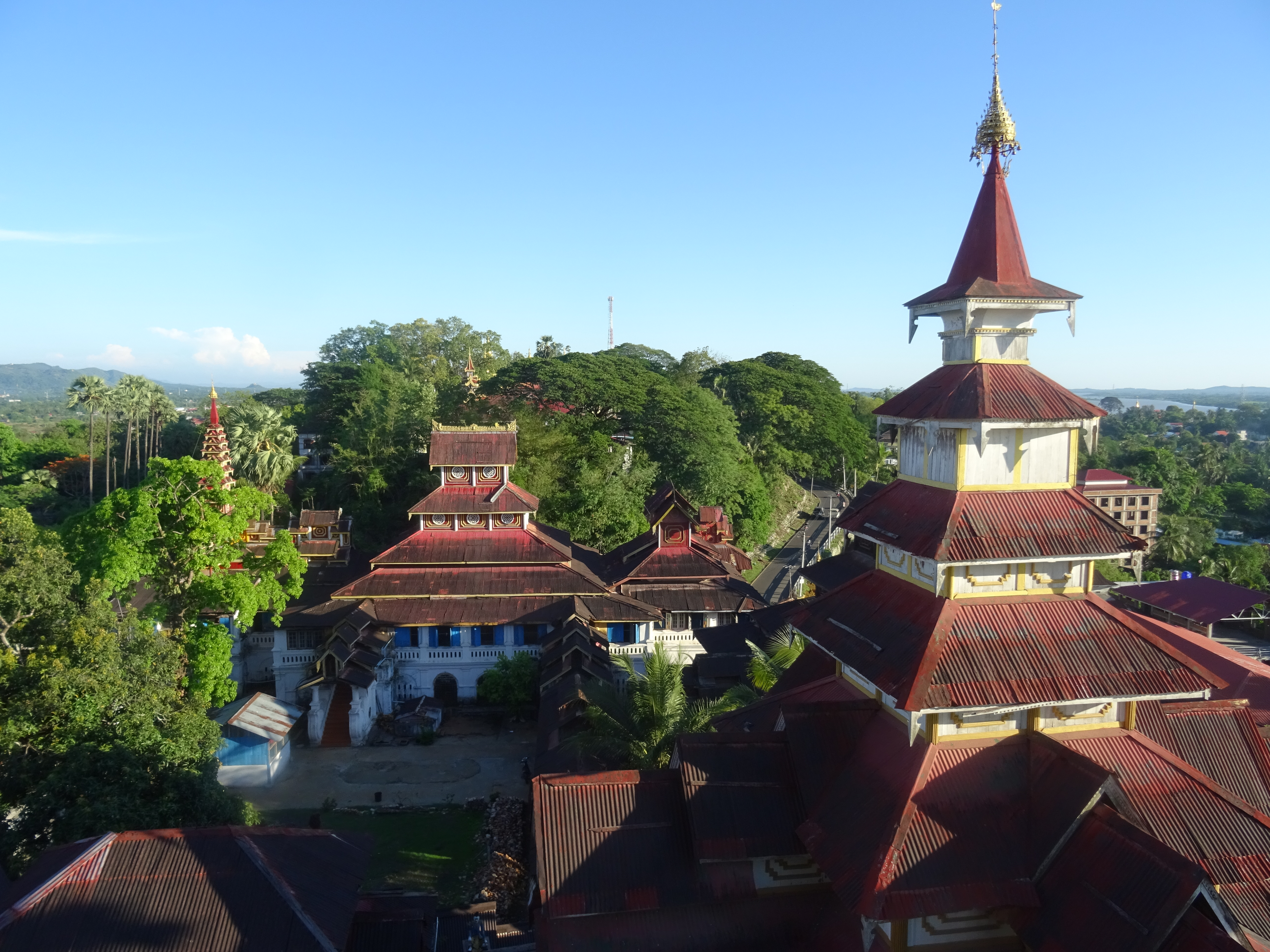
Yadanabonmyint Monastery

In 1878, after the death of King Mindon, she was imprisoned for failing to provide a list of the gold, silver, and other royal gifts he had given her. After the passing of King Mindon, to avoid the beset caused by Queen Hsinbyumashin faction in Upper Burma, she took refuge in Moulmein (now Mawlamyine), then British owned Lower Burma. There, she established the Yadanabonmyint Monastery (ရတနာဘုံမြင့်ကျောင်း). Later, she joined the Buddhist order of nun in Moulmein before she died on 15 May 1905.

== See also ==
- Konbaung dynasty
- List of Burmese consorts
