= Uzina Pagoda =

Buddhist temple in Myanmar

- ဦးဇိနစေတီတော်
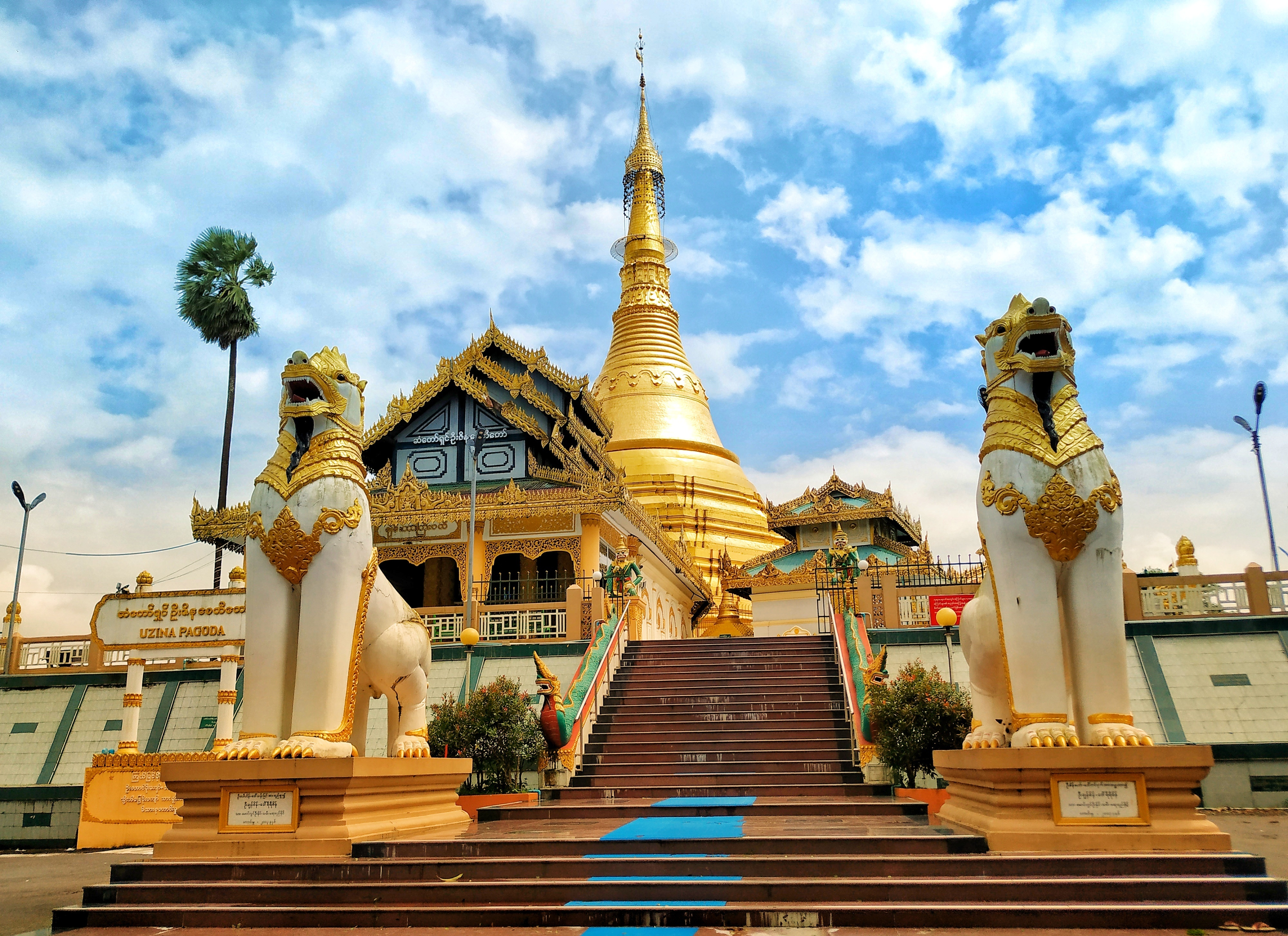

- Location within Myanmar

Religion
- Affiliation: Buddhism
- Region: Mon State
- Status: active

Location
- Country: Myanmar
- Coordinates: 16.4731674°N 97.6294996°E

Architecture
- Established: 19th century

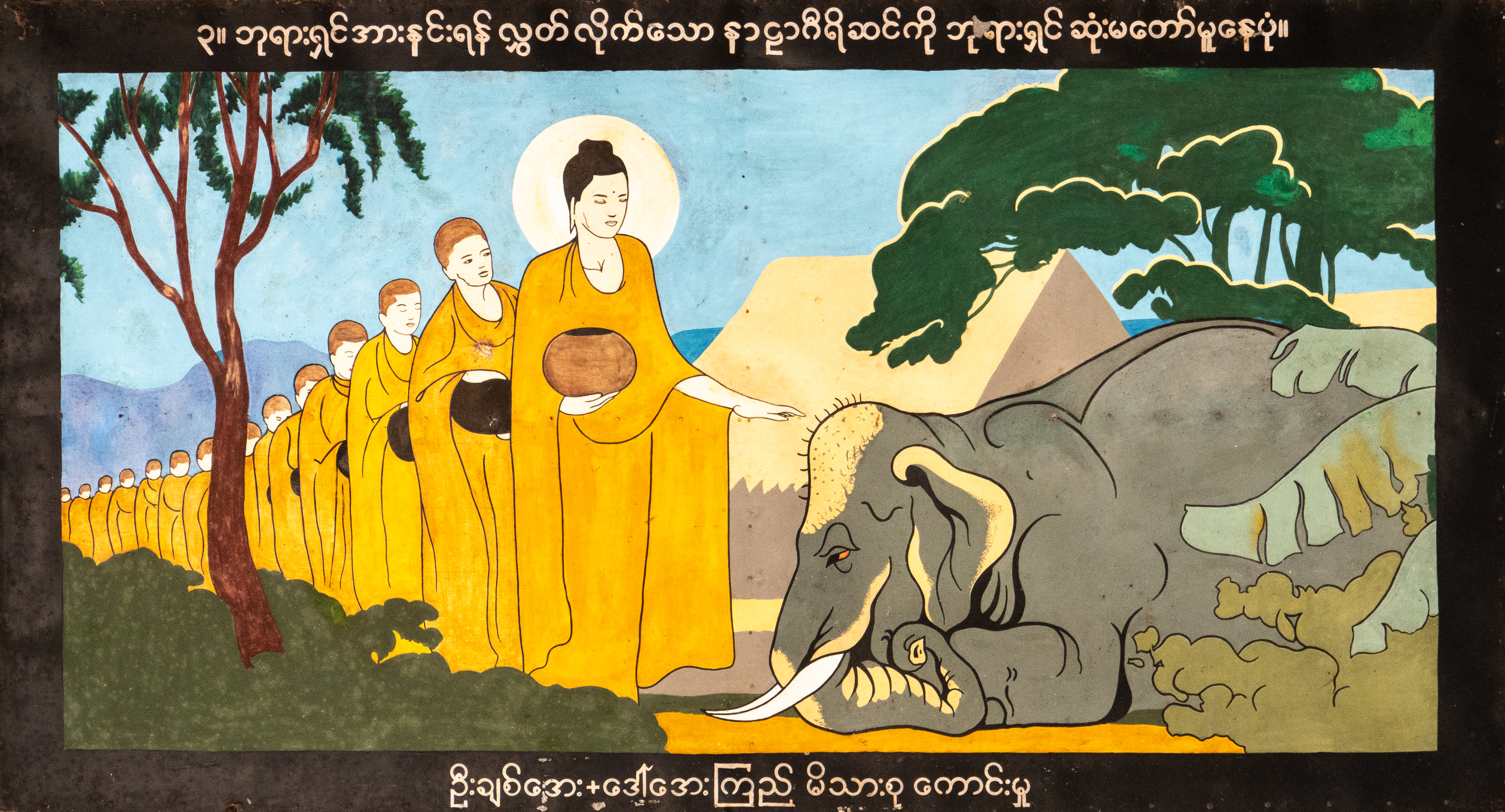
Artwork Above South Walkway Entrance to Uzina Pagoda (one of several)

The Uzina Pagoda, also known as the U Zina Pagaoda, is a Buddhist pagoda in Mawlamyine, Mon State, Myanmar. Built in the 19th century, the pagoda contains strands of hairs allegedly from the Buddha, and contains several sculptures symbolizing scenes from the Buddha's life. The temple itself is often associated with gemstones and wish fulfillment.
