= Mawlamyine =

Capital of Mon State, Myanmar

Mawlamyine မော်လမြိုင် မတ်မလီု Moulmein
- City
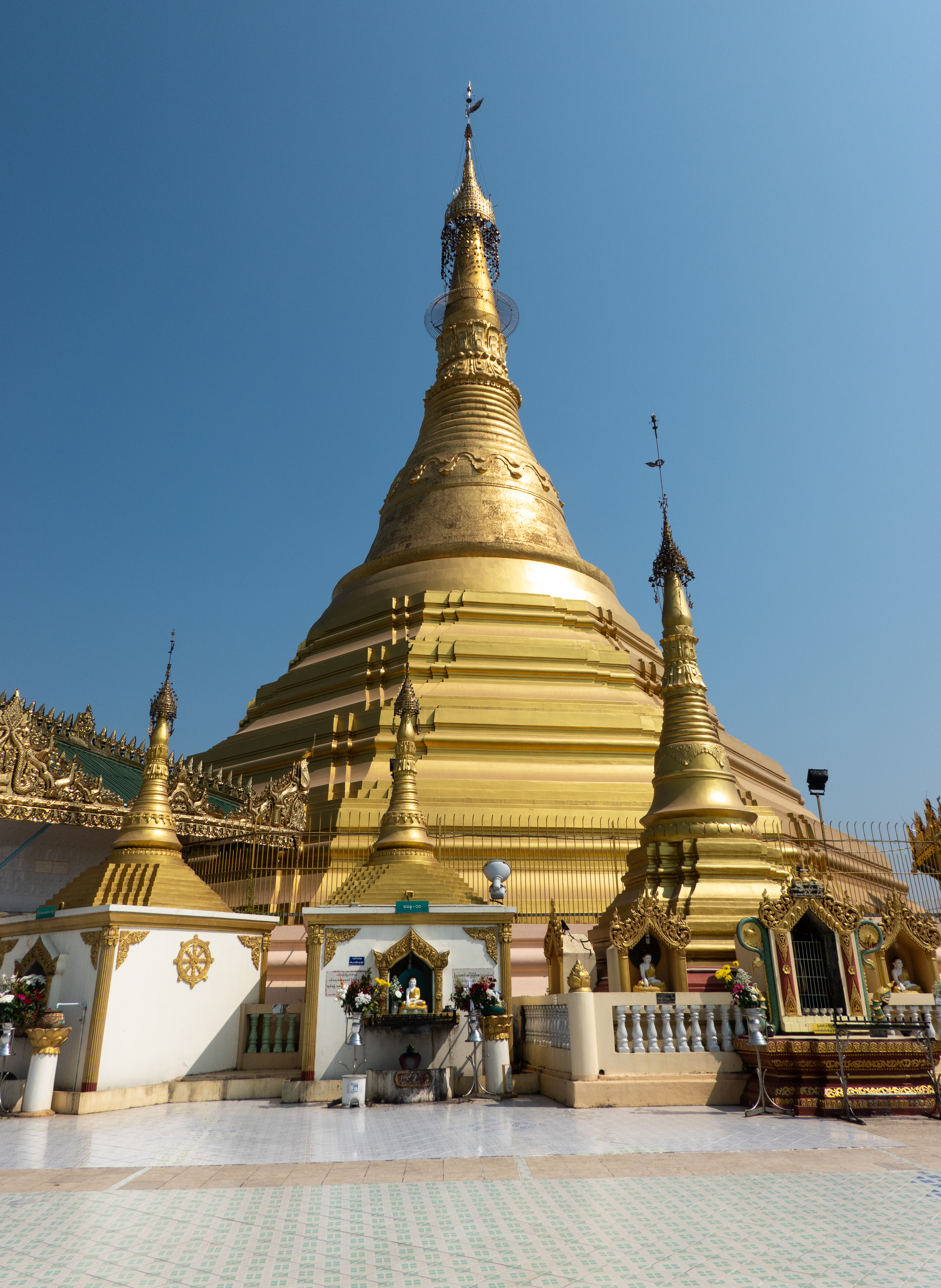
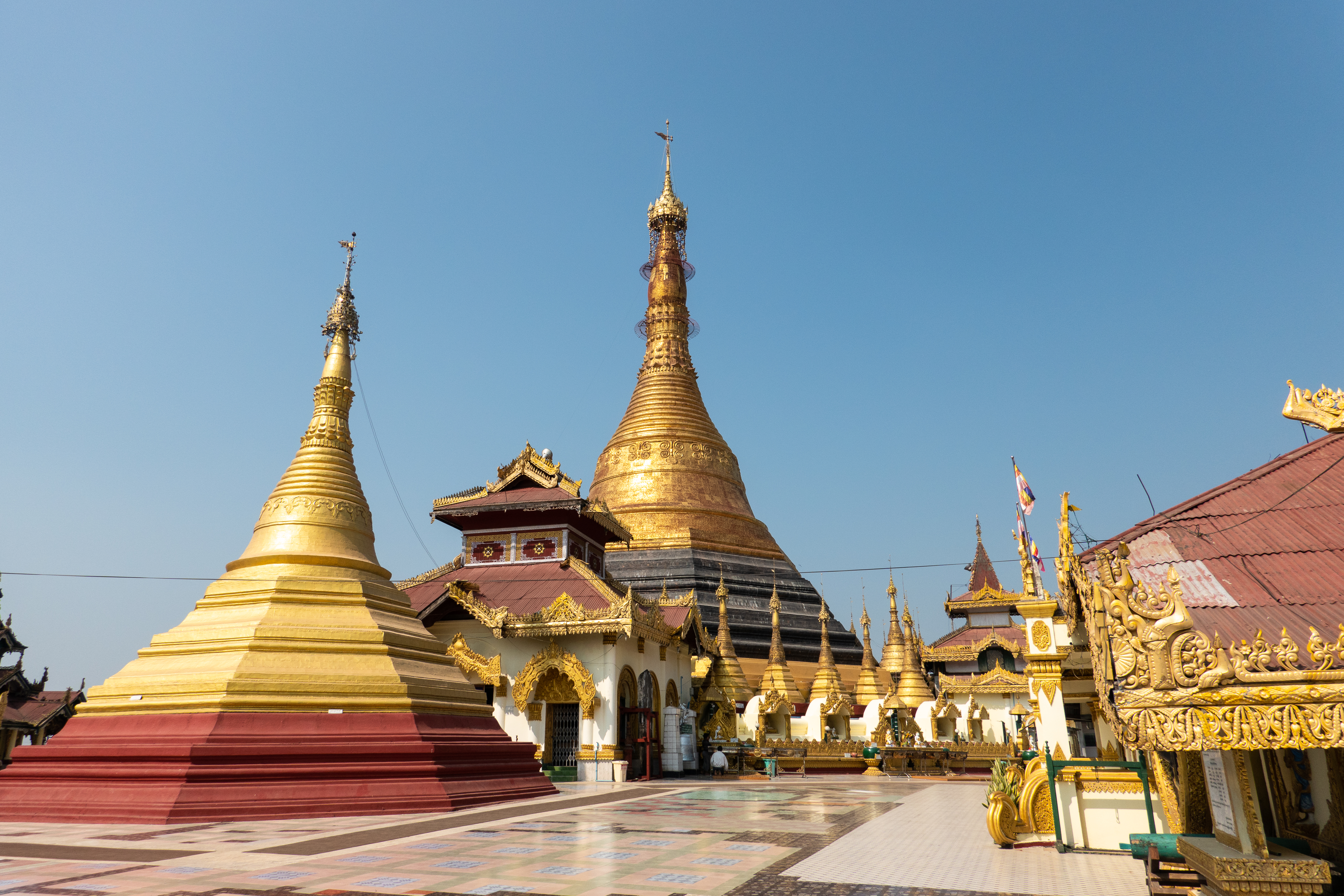
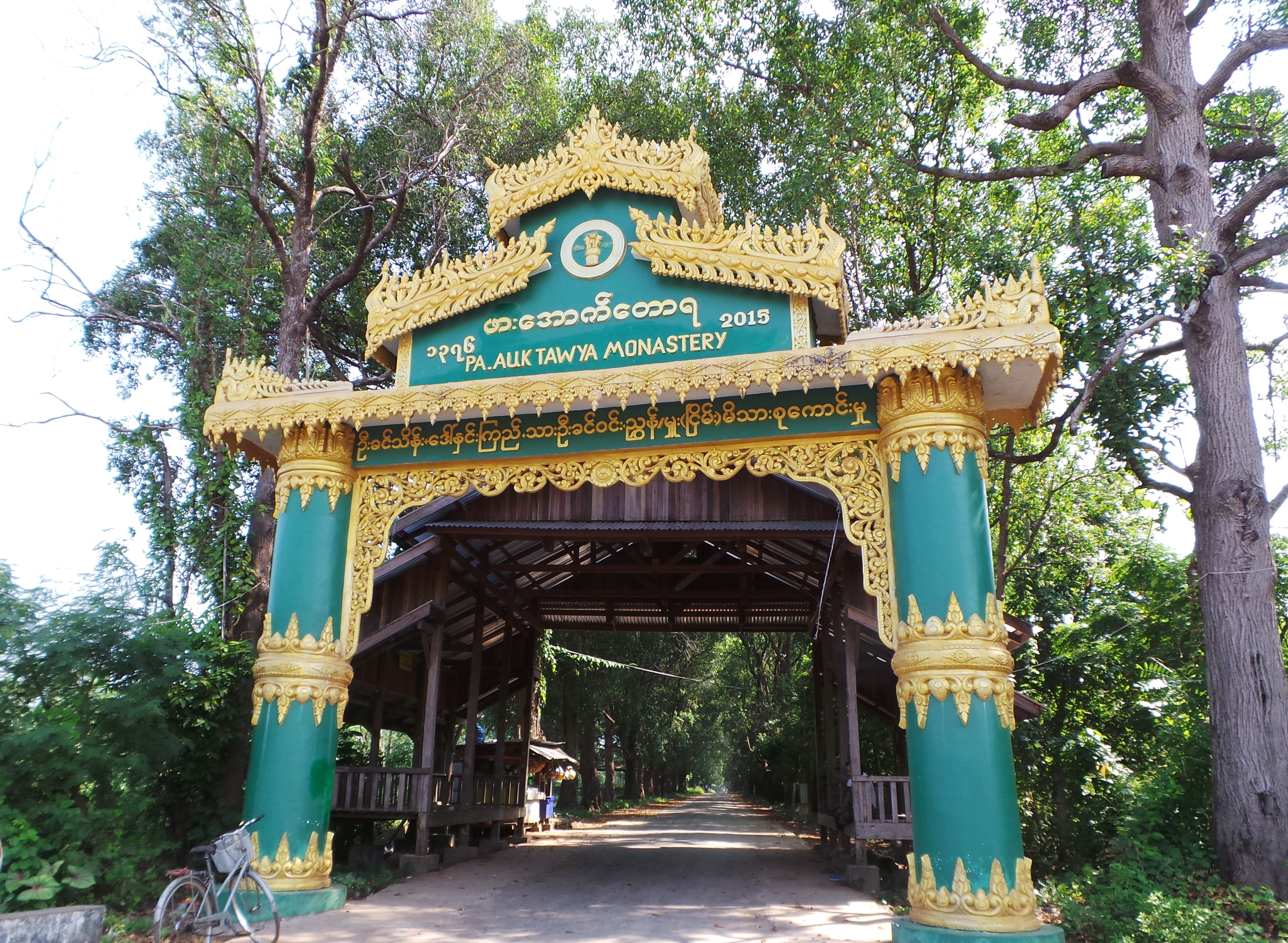
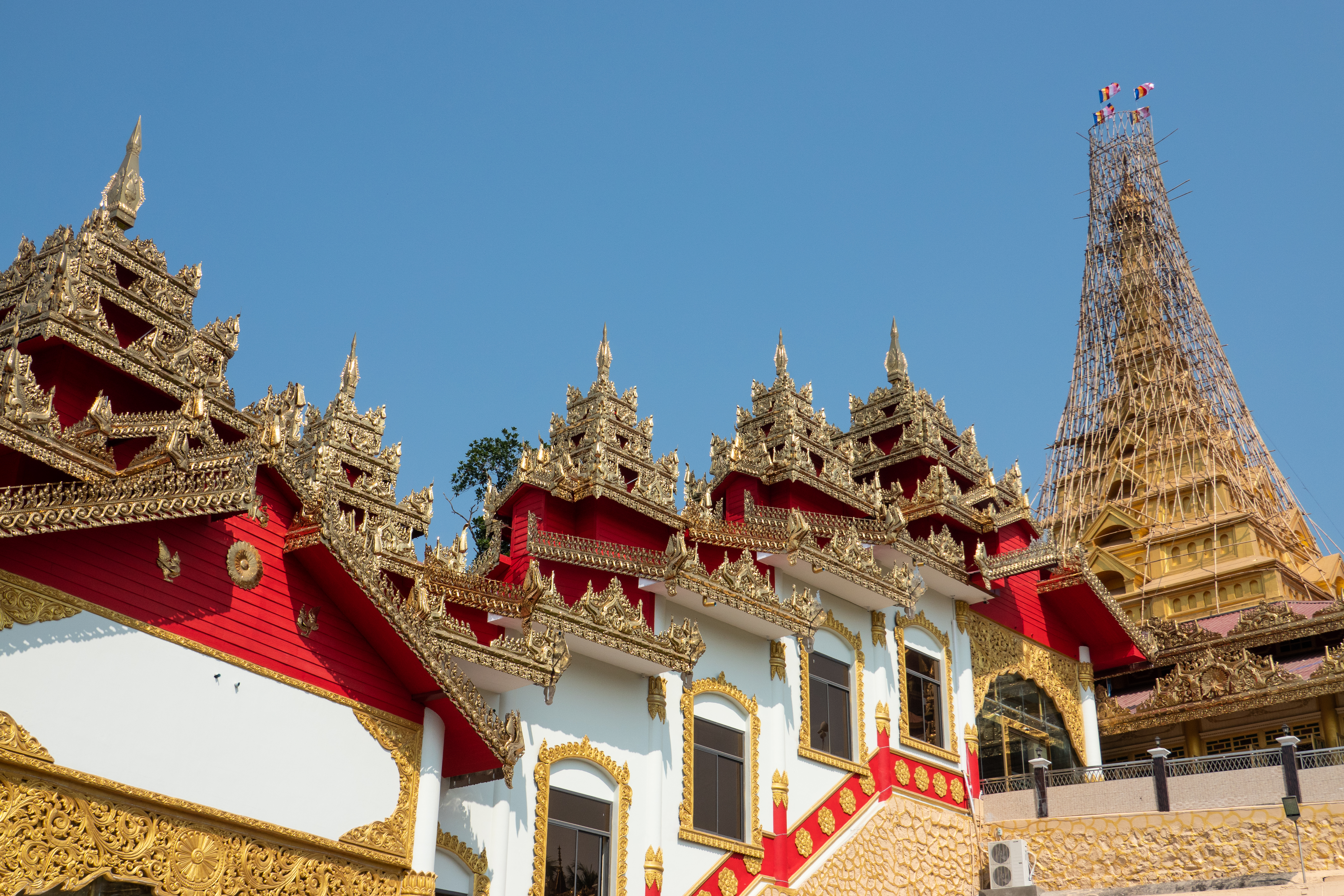
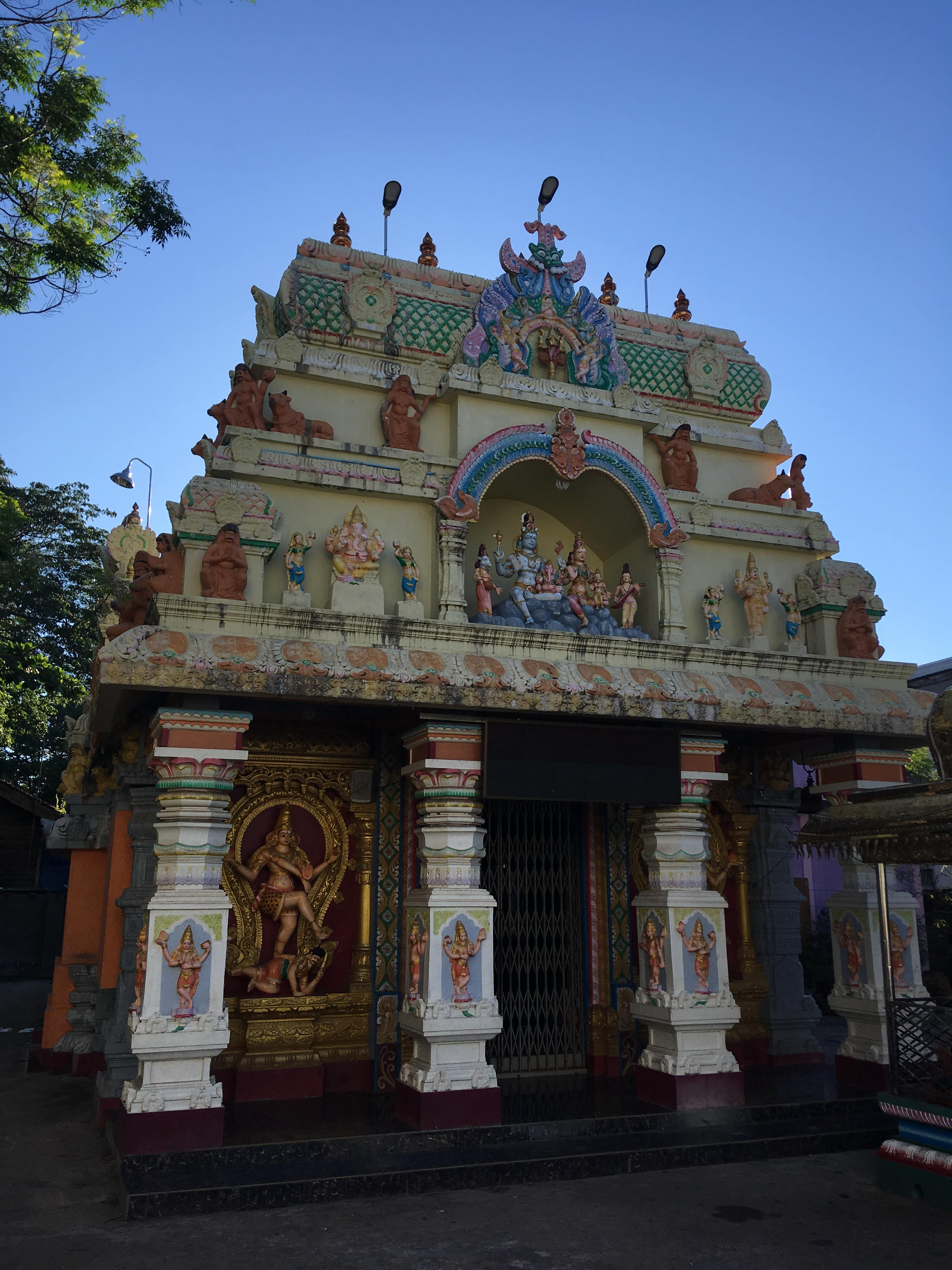
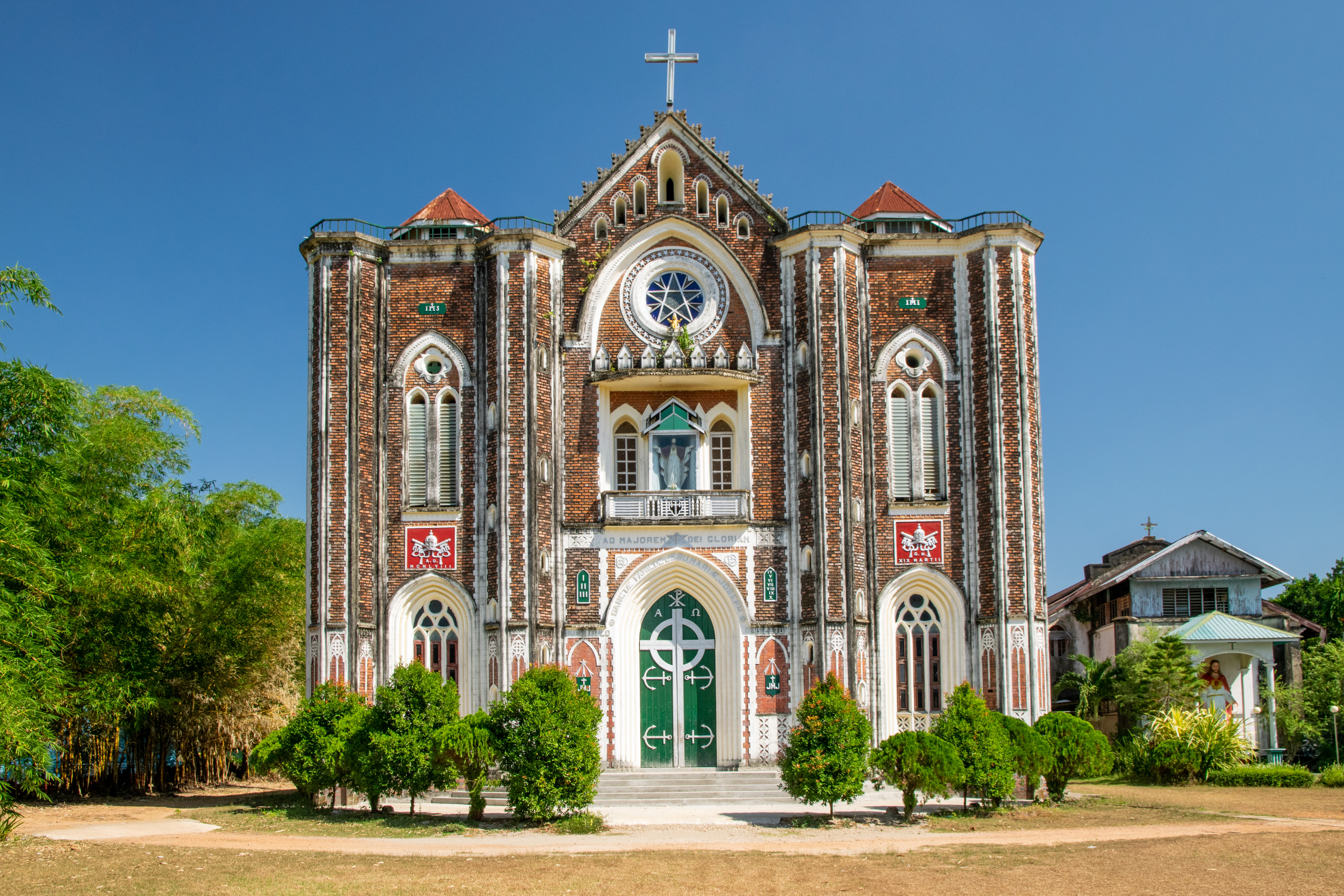
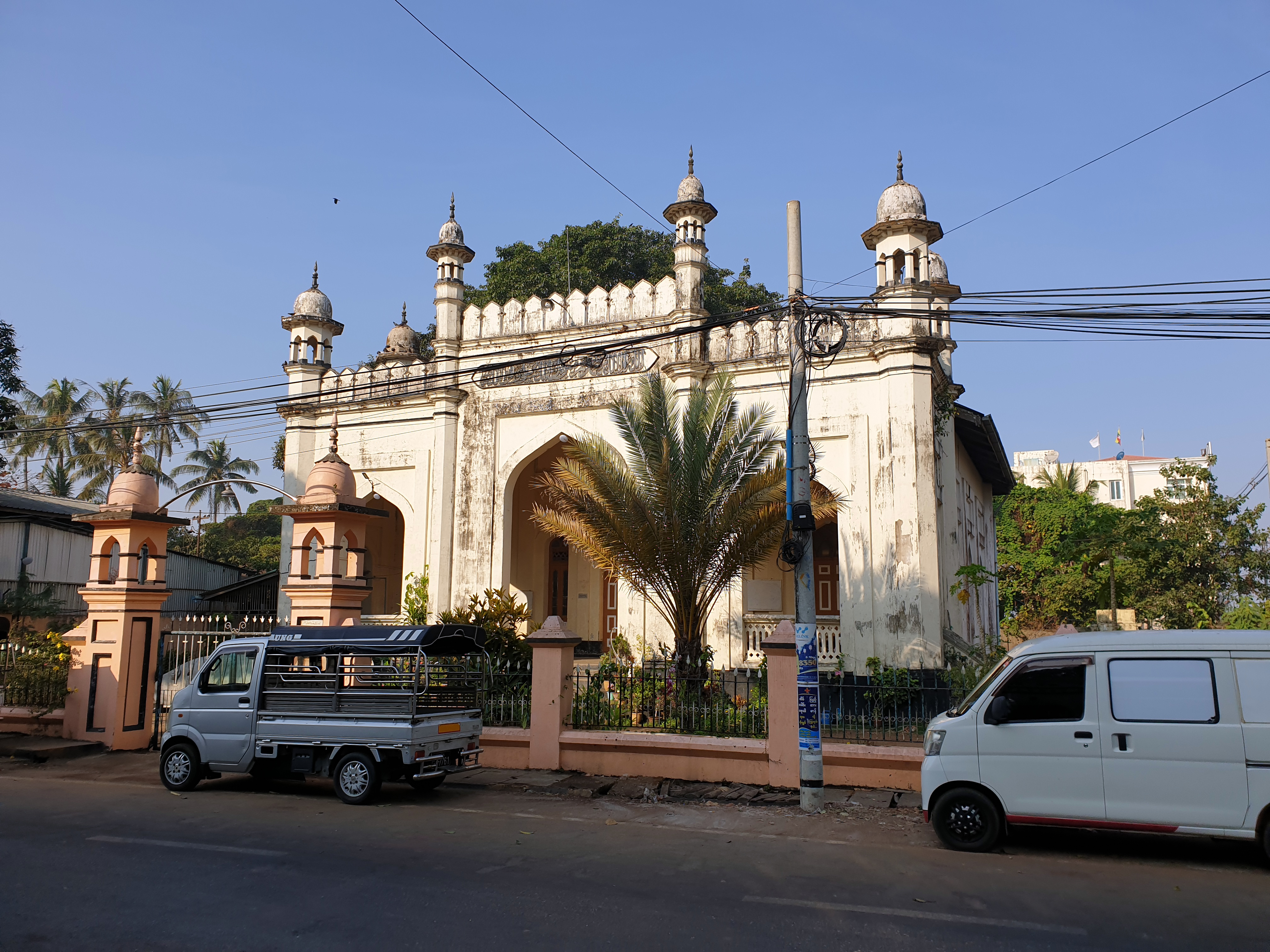
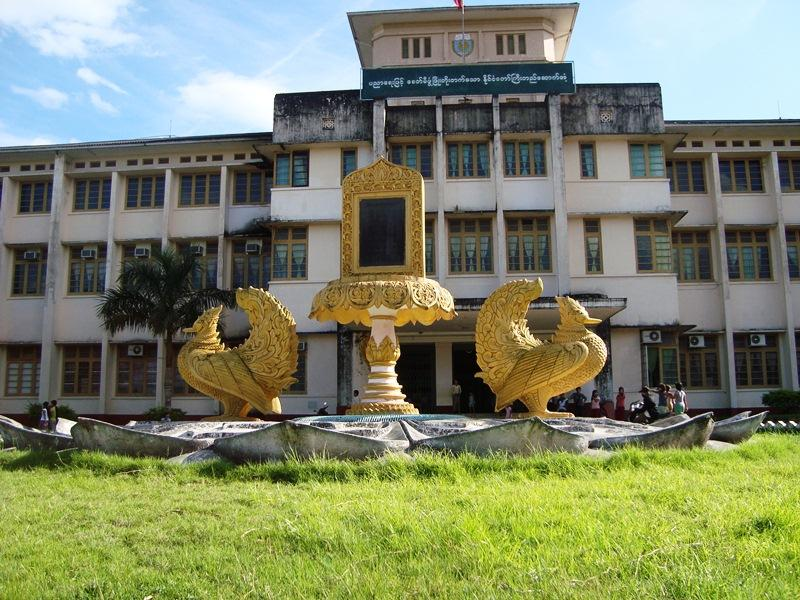
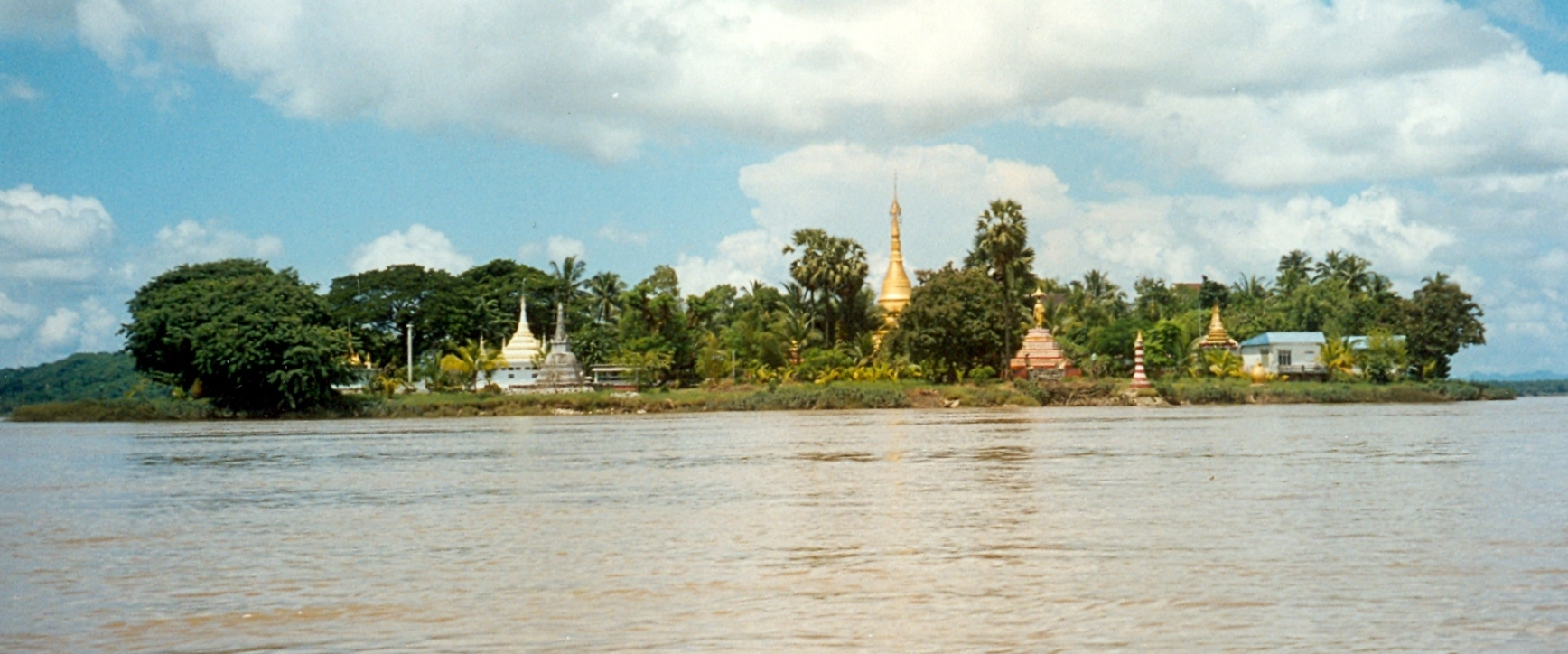
- Top to bottom and left to right: Uzina Pagoda, Kyaikthanlan Pagoda, Pa-Auk Forest Monastery, Mahar Myat Muni Pagoda, Shri Shiva Lokanathan Temple, Cathedral of the Holy Family, Moghul Shiah Mosque, Mawlamyine University, Shampoo Island on the Salween

- Location of Mawlamyine, Myanmar (Burma)
- Coordinates: 16°29′N 97°37′E
- Country: Myanmar
- State: Mon State
- District: Mawlamyine District
- Township: Mawlamyine Township

Government
  - Mayor: Dr. Aung Myat Kyaw Sein (I)

Population (2014 Census)
  - City: 289,388
  - Urban: 253,734
  - Rural: 35,654
  - Ethnicities: Mons; Burmans; Chinese; Indians; Karens; Rakhines; Shan
  - Religions: Theravada Buddhism; Christianity; Islam; Hinduism
- Demonym: Moulmeinian
- Time zone: UTC+6.30 (MST)
- Postal code: 12011
- Area code: 57

Mawlamyine (also spelled Mawlamyaing; Burmese: မော်လမြိုင်မြို့, MLCTS: mau la. mruing mrui., Burmese pronunciation: [mɔ̀ləmjàɪ̯ɰ̃ mjo̰]; Thai: เมาะลำเลิง; Mon: မတ်မလီု, Mon pronunciation: [mo̤t məlɜ̤m]), formerly Moulmein, is the fourth-largest city in Myanmar (Burma), 300 kilometres (190 mi) southeast of Yangon and 70 kilometres (43 mi) south of Thaton, at the mouth of Thanlwin (Salween) River. Mawlamyine was an ancient city and the first capital of British Burma. It also serves as the capital of Mon State.

== Etymology and legend ==
The Mon name which was previously used for Mawlamyine, Moulmein (မတ်မလီု; [mòt məlɜ̀m]) means "damaged eye" or "one-eyed man." According to legend, a Mon king had a powerful third eye in the centre of his forehead, able to see what was happening in neighbouring kingdoms. The daughter of one of the neighbouring kings was given in marriage to the three-eyed king and managed to destroy the third eye. The Burmese name "Mawlamyine" is believed to be a corruption of the Mon name.

Moulmein was also spelled as Maulmain or Moulmain or Maulmein in some records of the 19th century. The people of Moulmein were referred to as Moulmeinian.

== History ==
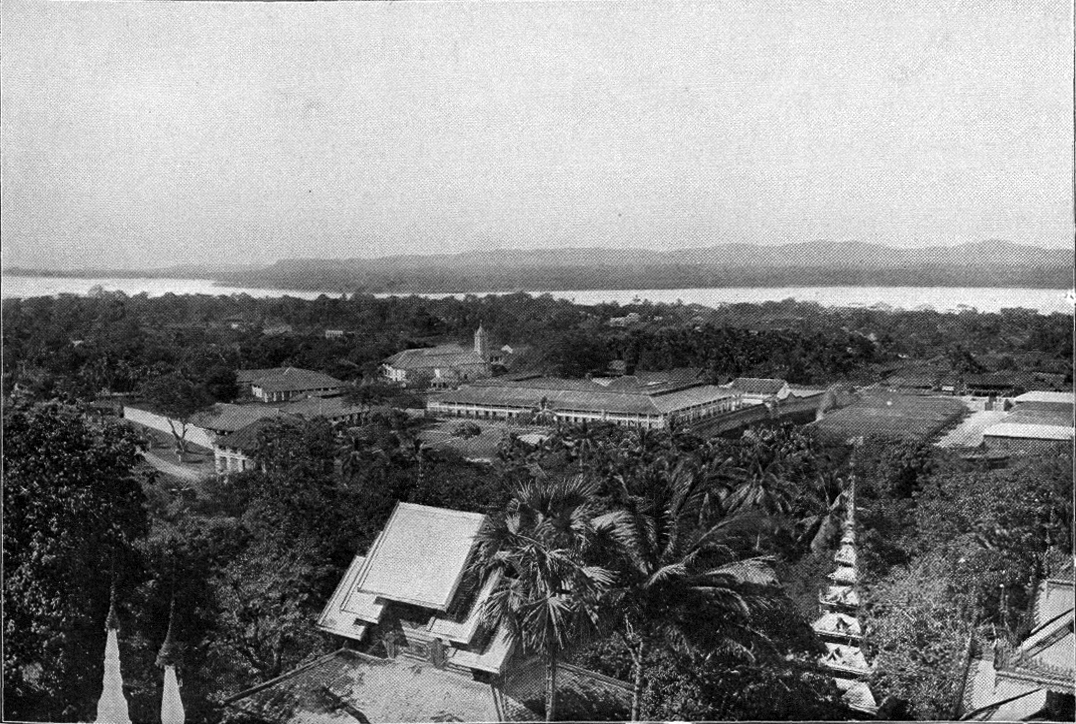
Moulmein and the mouth of the Thanlwin River in the early 1900s

=== Early history ===
==== Early Mon reigns ====
According to Kalyani Inscriptions erected by King Dhammazedi of Hanthawaddy Pegu in 1479, Mawlamyine was mentioned among the '32 myo' or thirty-two Mon cities within the Martaban division. Binnya U, a deputy of Viceroy Saw Binnya, was one of the notable governors of Mawlamyine in the early history of the city.

==== Toungoo dynasty ====
In May 1541, King Tabinshwehti and his deputy Bayinnaung captured Mawlamyine. During the reign of Bayinnaung, Toungoo Empire became the largest empire in the history of Southeast Asia. After his passing in 1581, his son Nanda Bayin and successors faced with rebellion by Lan Na, Siam, Lan Xang and renewed Portuguese incursions. In 1594, the governor of Mawlamyine who being in league with Siamese King Naresuan revolted against Toungoo court. Since then, the city became under the control of Siam (present-day Thailand) until 1614.

==== Konbaung dynasty ====
In 1760, General Minkhaung Nawrahta of the Royal Burmese Army repaired Mawlamyine on his way back from Burmese–Siamese War in Ayutthaya (former capital of Thailand). Kyaikthanlan Pagoda Inscription hinted that in 1764 (1125 ME), General Maha Nawrahta repaired Kyaikthanlan Pagoda on his way to capture Tavoy, and before finishing the repairment, Mawlamyine faced utter destruction.

=== Colonial Moulmein (1824–1948) ===
Mawlamyine was the first capital of British Burma between 1826 and 1852 after the Tanintharyi (Tenassarim) coast, along with Arakan, was ceded to Britain under the Treaty of Yandabo at the end of the First Anglo-Burmese War. After the first Anglo-Burmese war, the British made it their capital between 1826 and 1852, building government offices, churches and a massive prison. In 1829, the Moulmein Bar Association was founded by the Barristers in Mawlamyine. They started business enterprises and the country's first newspaper, The Maulmain Chronicle. Between 1826 and 1862, colonial Mawlamyine was the center of British Burma and the first port city that became a strategically important area and a geographical nodal point for the newly occupied British territory in Southeast Asia. Ever since the first British occupation in 1824, the growth and prosperity of Mawlamyine had steadily increased due to timber trade. Nevertheless, the decline in prosperity of Mawlamyine began when the supply of marketable timber from Salween Valley started to decrease in the 1890s.

During British colonial times, Germany, Siam, Persia, Denmark, Norway and Sweden opened and maintained consulates in Mawlamyine led by either consuls or vice-consuls while Italy and the United States placed consular agencies in Mawlamyine. German explorer Johann Wilhelm Helfer's landing at Moulmein shore on 8 February 1837 made him the first German to arrive in Burma in the history.

Mawlamyine was the setting of George Orwell's famous 1936 essay Shooting an Elephant, which was inspired by Orwell's posting to the city as a police officer in 1926. The story, which is most likely a mixture of fact and fiction, opens with the striking words:

"In Moulmein, in Lower Burma, I was hated by large numbers of people—the only time in my life that I have been important enough for this to happen to me."

During colonial times, Moulmein had a substantial Anglo-Burmese population. An area of the city was known as "Little England" due to the large Anglo-Burmese community, many of them running rubber plantations. This has since dwindled to a handful of families as most have left for the UK or Australia.

It was probably best known to English speakers through the opening lines of Rudyard Kipling's poem Mandalay:

"By the old Moulmein pagoda, lookin' lazy at the sea
There's a Burma girl a-settin', and I know she thinks o' me".

During WWII, the city and the Tanintharyi Region were the first objectives during the Japanese invasion of Burma.

==== "The old Moulmein pagoda" - Kyaik Than Lan ====
The "old Moulmein pagoda" Kipling cites is thought to be the Kyaik Than Lan (also spelled Kyaikthanlan) pagoda in Mawlamyine. It stands on a ridge, giving a panoramic view of the city, and is surrounded by 34 smaller temples. Among its sacred treasures is a hair relic of Buddha, received from a hermit in Thaton, as well as a tooth relic conveyed from Sri Lanka by a delegation of monks in ancient times.

=== Contemporary Mawlamyine ===
Soon after Burma's independence in 1948, the city fell into the hands of Karen insurgents. The Myanmar military retook the city with the help of UBS Mayu in 1950. Later, many colonial names of streets and parks of the city were changed to more nationalistic Burmese names. Mawlamyine stood as the third-largest city of Myanmar until the recent rise of Naypyidaw.

== Geography ==
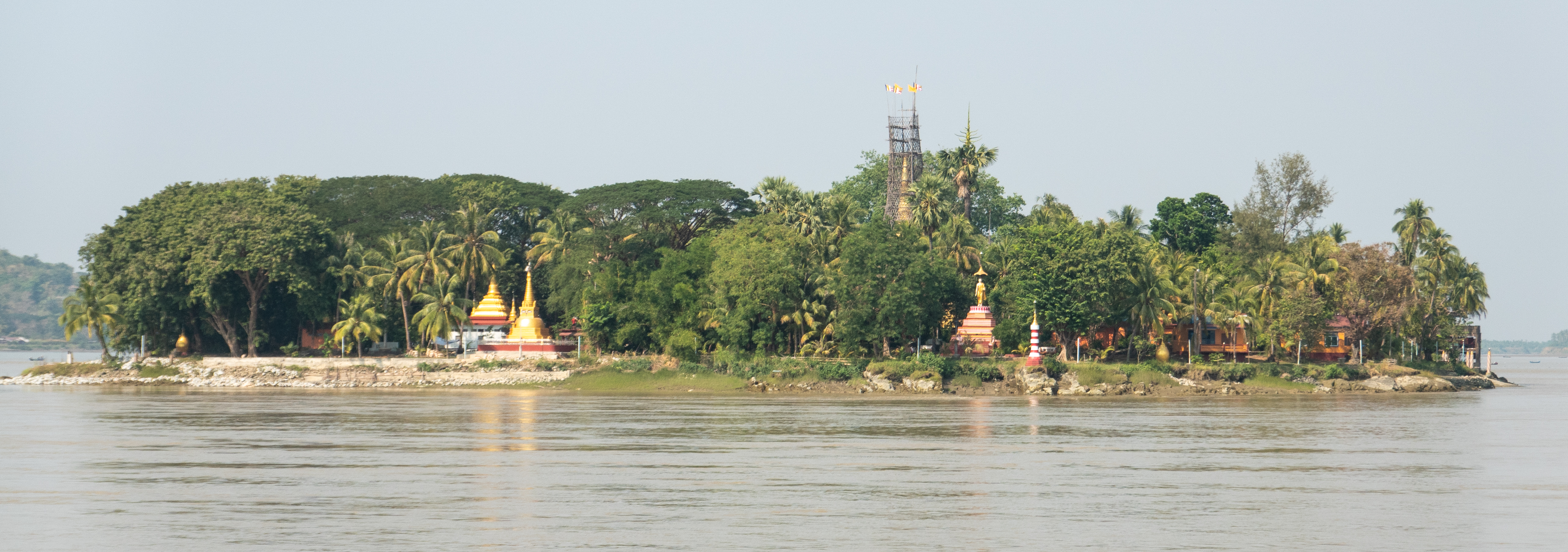
Shampoo Island near Mawlamyine.

Mawlamyine is in the Salween River delta, where the mouth of the Salween is sheltered by Bilugyun Island as it enters the Gulf of Martaban and the Andaman Sea. It is flanked by low hills dotted with ancient pagodas to the east and west.

=== Climate ===
Mawlamyine has a tropical monsoon climate (Köppen: Am) similar to the climates of Dawei and Sittwe. There is a lengthy dry season between mid-November and mid-April, and an extremely wet season due to the southwest monsoon between mid-April and mid-November. Between June and August when the surface westerly winds are strongest and supersaturated air is advected onto the nearby mountains, Mawlamyine averages around 1,100 millimetres or 43 inches of rain per month.

Climate data for Mawlamyine (1991–2020, extremes 1958–1994, 2012–present)
Month	Jan	Feb	Mar	Apr	May	Jun	Jul	Aug	Sep	Oct	Nov	Dec	Year
Record high °C (°F)	37.2 (99.0)	39.1 (102.4)	39.7 (103.5)	40.2 (104.4)	41.2 (106.2)	36.1 (97.0)	35.2 (95.4)	36.7 (98.1)	35.3 (95.5)	37.2 (99.0)	37.2 (99.0)	36.8 (98.2)	41.2 (106.2)
Mean daily maximum °C (°F)	33.0 (91.4)	34.6 (94.3)	35.9 (96.6)	36.2 (97.2)	33.0 (91.4)	30.2 (86.4)	29.2 (84.6)	29.0 (84.2)	30.5 (86.9)	32.9 (91.2)	33.5 (92.3)	32.7 (90.9)	32.5 (90.5)
Daily mean °C (°F)	25.8 (78.4)	27.2 (81.0)	29.1 (84.4)	30.6 (87.1)	28.8 (83.8)	27.2 (81.0)	26.5 (79.7)	26.3 (79.3)	27.2 (81.0)	28.4 (83.1)	27.9 (82.2)	26.2 (79.2)	27.6 (81.7)
Mean daily minimum °C (°F)	18.6 (65.5)	19.9 (67.8)	22.4 (72.3)	24.9 (76.8)	24.6 (76.3)	24.1 (75.4)	23.7 (74.7)	23.7 (74.7)	23.9 (75.0)	23.9 (75.0)	22.3 (72.1)	19.8 (67.6)	22.7 (72.9)
Record low °C (°F)	12.2 (54.0)	12.2 (54.0)	16.7 (62.1)	19.4 (66.9)	16.7 (62.1)	21.1 (70.0)	18.9 (66.0)	18.9 (66.0)	21.1 (70.0)	19.4 (66.9)	15.0 (59.0)	11.1 (52.0)	11.1 (52.0)
Average precipitation mm (inches)	8.8 (0.35)	4.5 (0.18)	19.3 (0.76)	59.5 (2.34)	542.0 (21.34)	953.1 (37.52)	1,240.2 (48.83)	1,224.6 (48.21)	692.2 (27.25)	193.1 (7.60)	27.8 (1.09)	14.2 (0.56)	4,979.2 (196.03)
Average precipitation days (≥ 1.0 mm)	0.7	0.4	1.6	4.0	19.2	26.5	27.9	28.2	23.0	11.8	2.2	0.6	146
Source 1: World Meteorological Organization
Source 2: Sistema de Clasificación Bioclimática Mundial (records), NOAA (extremes)

== Transport ==
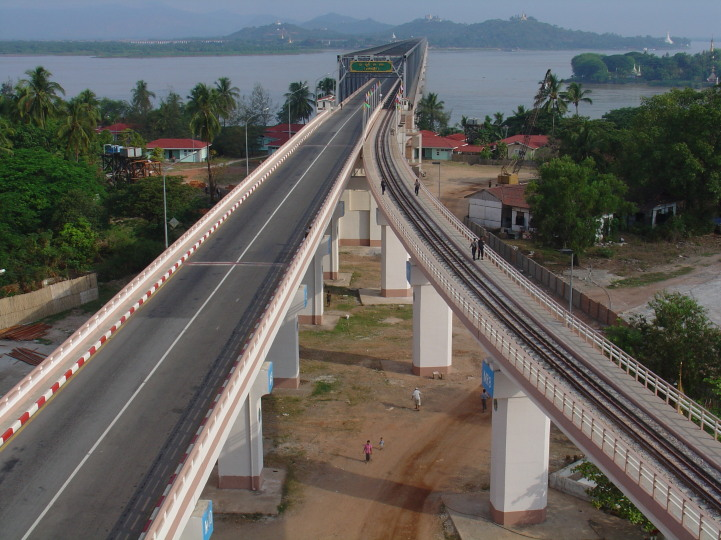
Thanlwin Bridge

=== Airport ===
Mawlamyine Airport has regular flights to Yangon (Rangoon).

=== Bus and taxis ===
Mawlamyine is the main gateway to south eastern Myanmar. Thanlwin Bridge, the longest road and rail bridge in Myanmar is the most prominent landmark in the area. It stretches 11,000 feet (3,400 metres) over the Thanlwin River connecting the country's south eastern region with Yangon. The city has a central highway bus station. The city is connected to Pa-an in Kayin State in the north-east and Dawei and Myeik in Tanintharyi Division in the south by road. Via Kawkareik, the city is also connected with Thai-Myanmar border town Myawaddy. Newly opened Bogyoke Aung San Bridge (Bilu Kyun) connects Mawlamyine with nearby Bilu island, lies about 500 metres west off the shore of Mawlamyine.

In Mawlamyine, motorcycles and tuk-tuk (Thone Bee in Burmese) motorised tricycles cumulatively registered for use as taxis. Mawlamyine is also served by bus networks which radiate mostly from the north to the south.

=== Railways ===
It was the rail head to Ye, linked to Yangon by rail only from Mottama (Martaban) across the river by ferry, but today connected by the Thanlwin Bridge (Mawlamyine) opened in April 2006.

Mawlamyine Railway Station, which was reportedly built to the standards of an "ASEAN railway station", is the terminus of Myanmar Railways' Yangon–Mawlamyine Railway and Tanintharyi Line.

=== Water transport ===
In colonial era, Mawlamyine (then Moulmein) port was served by European shipping companies including Scottish-owned British-India Steam Navigation Company and Irrawaddy Flotilla Company.

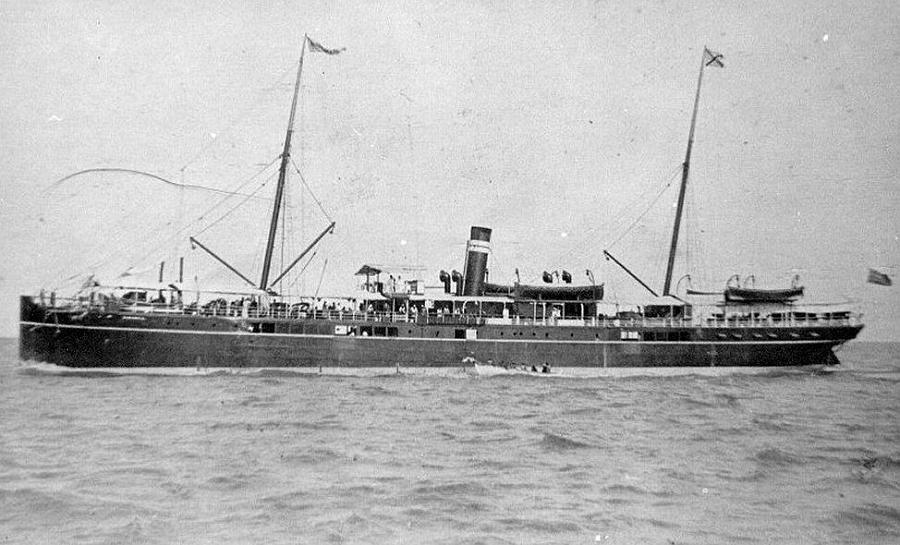
A steamer owned by British-India Steam Navigation Company in 1887

The port was important not only for inland navigation but also for international shipping. Rice and teak from sawmills at Mawlamyine were exported worldwide by those shipping companies. The 1880 handbook of British-India Steam Navigation Company listed:

- Calcutta - Rangoon - Moulmein (started in 1857)
- Moulmein - Penang - Malacca - Singapore (started in 1862)
- Moulmein - Penang - Colombo - Bombay lines in operations.

In 1894, the journey between Barr Street Jetty of Rangoon to the Main Wharf of Moulmein took about nine hours at a fare of 10 Rupees for second class.

Nowadays, although much diminished from its past prominence, water-based transport still plays an important role in connecting between Mawlamyine and the immediate upstream towns. The Port of Mawlamyine is currently under the management of Myanma Port Authority and is located on the Thanlwin River about 28 nautical miles inland from the Kyaikkhame point on the Gulf of Martaban, 2 kilometres from Mawlamyine railway station.

== Cityscape ==
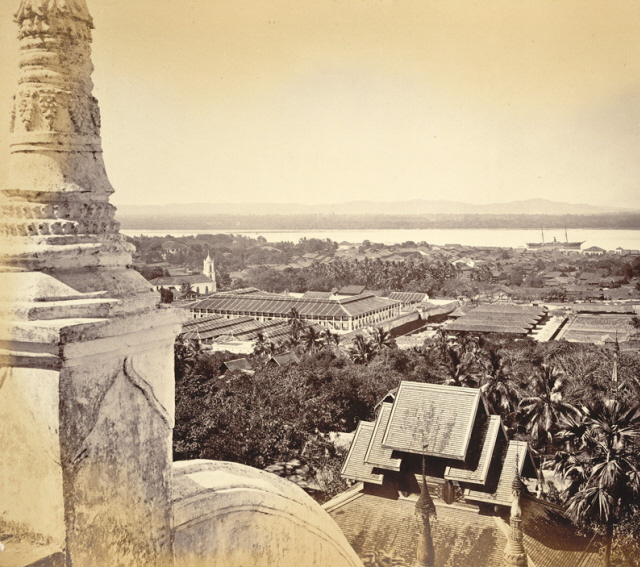
Moulmein (Mawlamyine) in the 1870s by Samuel Bourne (1832–1912)

=== Around the city ===
==== Heritage buildings ====
- Kyaikthanlan Pagoda: It was built in 875 AD during the reign of Mon King Mutpi Raja, it was raised from its original height of 56 feet (17 metres) to the present 150 feet (46 metres) by successive kings including Wareru, founder of the Kingdom of Hanthawaddy Pegu. In 1831, to prevent Moulmein's identity from fading away, Sitke Maung Htaw Lay, who later served as Magistrate of Moulmein restored the pagoda with the funds raised by public subscriptions. Being situated on the range of hill, the pagoda overlooks the city, nearby islands, Gulf of Martaban, surrounding rivers and the limestone mountains of Kayin State in the east. Rudyard Kipling is believed to have written his famous "Lookin' lazy at the sea" line at this pagoda in 1890.
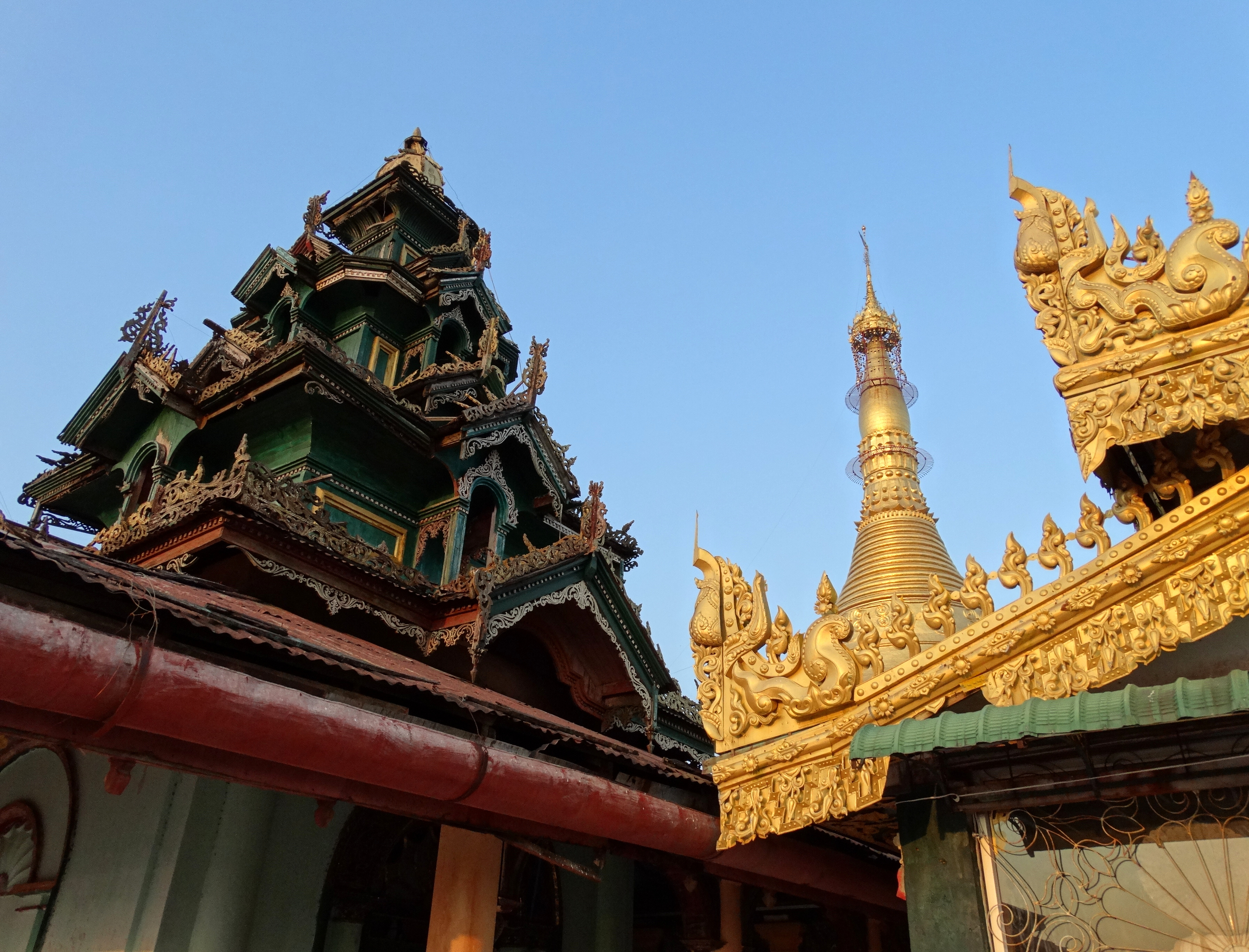
  Architecture at Kyaik Than Lan Pagoda in 2014
- U-zina Pagoda: The pagoda is one of the principal pagodas situated on the range of hill. According to legend, the pagoda contains a hair of Buddha and was built during the reign of King Ashoka, the great protector of Buddhism. The U-zina pagoda was named after the sage, U-zina who restored it in 1838. Prior to this the pagoda had been known as Kyaik Pa-dhan pagoda.
- Princess Ashin Hteik Suhpaya's tomb: Princess Ashin Hteik Suhpaya (also known as Princess Myat Phaya Galay) who was the fourth daughter of King Thibaw, the last king of Konbaung dynasty returned to Burma from exile in 1915 and lived at her mansion on West Cantonment Road, Mawlamyine until her death in 1936. Her tomb is located near Kyaikthanlan Pagoda. The remains of her son, Prince Taw Phaya Nge and her daughter, Princess Hteik Su Phaya Htwe were also buried in the tomb in the later years.
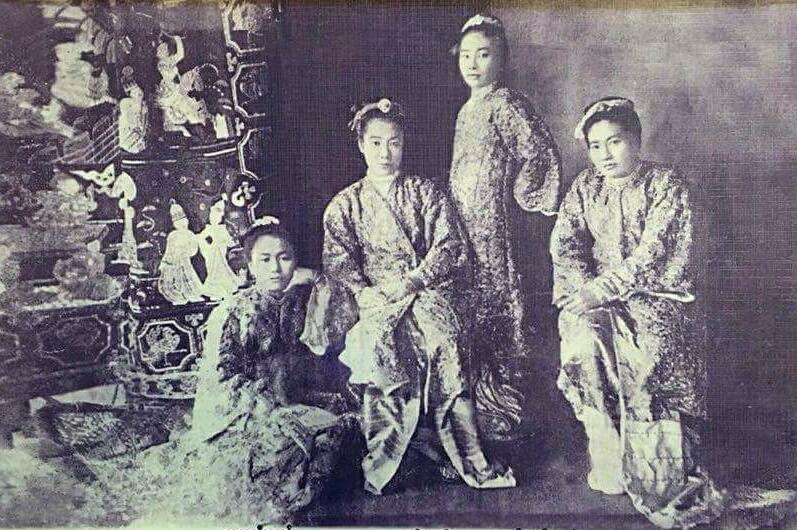
  The four daughters of King Thibaw in 1914 (Princess Myat Phaya Galay on the left)
- First Baptist Church: The church is Myanmar's first Baptist church and it was initially built in 1827 by Adoniram Judson, a 19th-century American missionary who compiled the first Burmese-English dictionary. The church is regarded as a landmark for its significance to the Baptist movement worldwide.
- St Matthew's Church: It was the first English Church (Anglican Church) built in Myanmar. It was initially erected in 1832 and the current handsome structure was rebuilt in 1887. It was designed and restored by the English architects James Piers St Aubyn and Henry J. Wadling of London and the foundation stone was laid by Sir Charles Crosthwaite, then Chief Commissioner of Burma. It is of red brick, the capitals of interior pillars being stone, and is said to be a model of English Church at Dresden. Moulmein was the root of British feminist Ellen Kate Limouzin and Ida Mabel Limouzin (George Orwell's mother), and George Orwell attended the church during his days as Imperial Policeman in Moulmein in 1926 and the church compound has grave stones of his relatives. During the Japanese conquest of Burma in WWII, the Japanese Army stored salt in the church. Though the church is still in use, it is in a state of decay and is in urgent need of conservation.
- St Patrick's Church: The St Patrick's Roman Catholic church was built in 1829; the French people constructed the clock tower of the church around 1854. St Patrick's school in the church compound was once a boarding school for the children of the elite in colonial times. The tragic love story of Thailand's Prince Sukkasem, the heir to the Lanna throne, and a Mon commoner girl started during his time at this school in the 1890s and was immortalised in Thai folk song and Thai literature.
- Police Commissioner Headquarters: Built in 1826 on a hill in Than Lwin Park. The impressive colonial building was the place where George Orwell worked as Assistant District Superintendent in 1926.
- Old Moulmein Prison: The Mawlamyine's colonial-era prison was initially built in the 1830s. Sir Richard Hieram Sankey, an Irish military engineer who is credited with designing much of the infrastructure of the Indian city of Bangalore, used to work at this prison as Superintendent of the jail in 1860. George Orwell was believed to have witnessed hanging there and it is the setting of his short story "A Hanging (1931)". During WWII, following the Fall of Singapore in 1942, Allied soldiers transferred from Changi Prison were held in the Moulmein Prison by the Imperial Japanese Army before they were sent to the notorious death railway construction. In 2015, the prison was closed and relocated to a new facility near Yedwingone village in Kyaikmawyaw township.
- Yadanabonmyint Monastery: It is also known as Queen Seindon Monastery. It is known for its craftsmanship.

==== Islands ====
- Bilu Island (Belu-kyun): The local meaning of the island's name is Ogre Island. The island is famous for handicraft and Mon traditional culture.
- Gaungsay Kyun Island (Shampoo Island): A tiny island lies between Mottama and the north bank of Mawlamyine is called Gaungsay Kyun island, literally: "Head Washing Island". In ancient times, the clear pristine water obtained from a small rocky outcrop of the island was carried to the palace and used by Burmese kings at royal hair-washing ceremonies during Thingyan. In colonial days, the island was known in its European name "Crow Island" for being the home of all the crows in the city.

==== Bridges ====
- Thanlwin Bridge (Mawlamyine)
- Attaran Bridge (Mawlamyine)
- Thanlwin Bridge (Chaungzon)

==== Others ====
- Mon State Cultural Museum (Mon Ethnic Cultural Museum)
- Mottama (formerly Martaban): A small town located opposite to the north bank of Mawlamyine was the first capital of the Hanthawaddy kingdom in the 13th and 14th centuries after the collapse of Pagan (Bagan) Empire in 1287. During Burmese–Siamese wars between the 16th and 18th centuries, Martaban was an important rallying spot for Burmese troops moving from Upper Burma to sack Ayutthaya Kingdom. Between 2nd-century BCE and 15th-century CE, Martaban was a main trading port in the historic Maritime Silk Road that connects Korea, China, Southeast Asia, the Indian subcontinent, Ceylon, Arabian Peninsula, Horn of Africa and all the way to Egypt and eventually Rome or Europe. The Martaban jars were imported and got its namesake from this Martaban port city as early as the fourteenth century.
  The Maritime Silk Road in the 1st century
- Pa-Auk Forest Monastery: The main monastery complex and meditation centre is located in a forest near Pa-Auk village along the Taung Nyo Mountain range 15 kilometres southeast of Mawlamyine. The monastery is known for the practice of meditation. 500–1000 meditators from over 20 countries reside in the monastery.
- Win Sein reclining Buddha: 29 km south of Mawlamyine is the world's largest reclining Buddha at Mudon. It is approached by a roadway with 500 life size statues of Arahant disciples of Buddha and a hall whose chamber walls display scenes of Buddha's lifetime, and the underworld.
- Thanbyuzayat War Cemetery: 64 kilometres south of Mawlamyine is prisoners-of-war cemetery and the notorious death railway connected with the Bridge over the River Kwai. The cemetery contains the graves of 3,770 British, Australian, Dutch and other soldiers. It was formally opened on 10 December 1946 by General Aung San and then Governor Sir Hubert Rance.

== Economy ==
Mawlamyine is famous for its tropical fruits and for its cuisine as indicated in the popular Burmese expression, "Mandalay for the speaking, Yangon for the bragging, and Mawlamyine for the eating." (မန္တလေးစကား ရန်ကုန်အကြွား မော်လမြိုင်အစား) Among its tropical fruits, Mawlamyine pomelo, durian and rambutan are traded countrywide.

Mawlamyine had several sawmills and rice mills as teak and rice were transported down the Salween. It was once a busy shipbuilding center and remains an important port. At least one major British shipping line had some of their ships built here. The teak "country-built" ships generally had a longer service life than those constructed from European hardwoods. The city had a solar-powered plant for extracting salt from seawater and a diesel electric plant. On the night of 1 December 2008, a fire that started from a floating restaurant destroyed the larger of city's two markets called the lower bazaar.

=== Industry ===
The city has two industrial zones. Of two, the newly opened Kyauktan industrial zone features a variety of different business enterprises, including zinc, barbed wire, ready-mix cement, food and drink production, textiles, gold purification, ice factories, shoe production facilities, furniture enterprise, plastic enterprises, cool seafood storage and car accessory businesses.

As a cross-border investment, the state-of-the-art combined-cycle gas power plant in Mawlamyine was constructed by Singapore's United Overseas Bank (UOB) backed Singapore company Asiatech Energy. The Mawlamyine power plant brings a sustainable supply of power to residents and businesses in Mon State.

In July 2017, to make the country's oil and gas industry more efficient, the Myanmar Investment Commission (MIC) granted an approval to a subsidiary of Singapore-based firm to construct an offshore supply base in the 46 acres of river front land of Mawlamyine. It would provide a wide range of services to the operators of oil and gas fields in the waters off the coast in the Bay of Bengal.

=== Transport hub ===
Mawlamyine is the western terminus and an important part of the East-West Economic Corridor. The 1450-kilometre east–west economic corridor links the South China Sea at Da Nang to Mawlamyine through Laos and Thailand. By using the East-West Economic Corridor, the travel time between Bangkok and Yangon is just three days, compared with the two to three weeks needed for conventional marine transportation via the Straits of Malacca. Japan's Nippon Express started land transportation services between Thailand and Myanmar in 2016.

== Flora and fauna ==
Mawlamyine Pomelo

Durian

Rubber plantation

Durian plantation

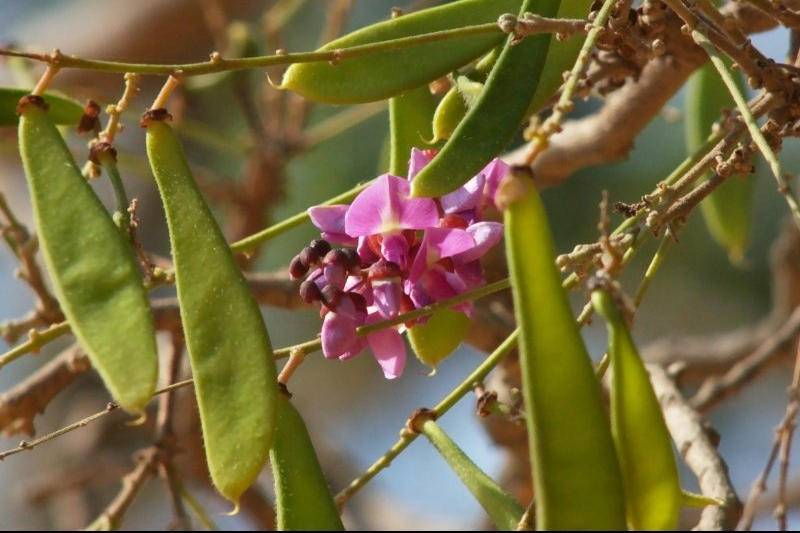
Moulmein Rosewood

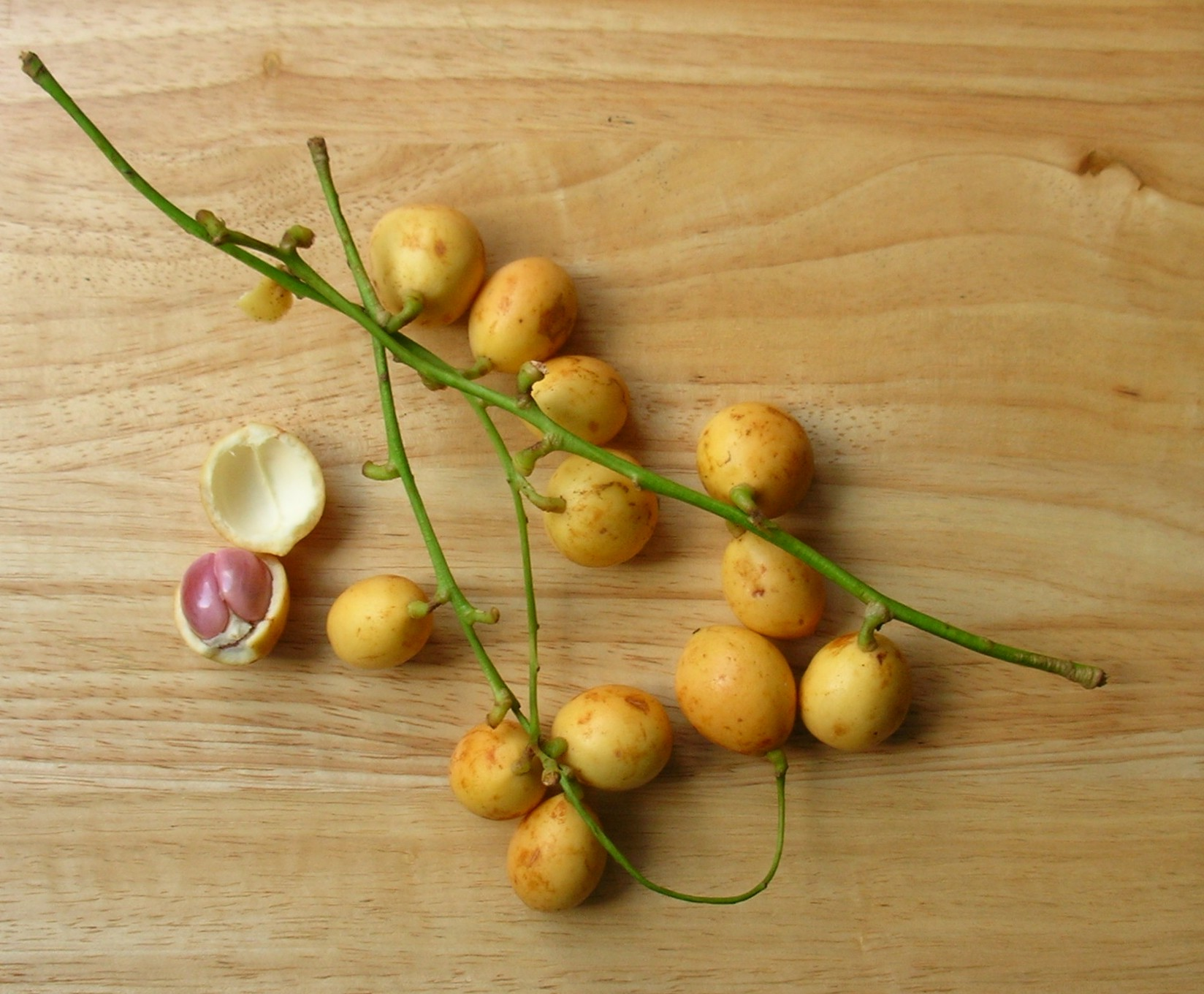
Baccaurea ramiflora

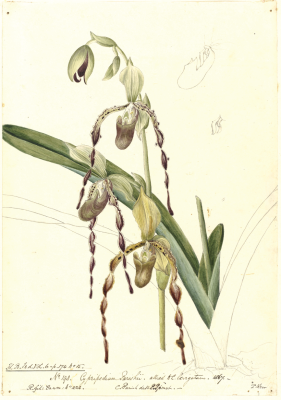
Paphiopedilum parishii, native to Moulmein discovered by Charles Parish and wife in 1867.

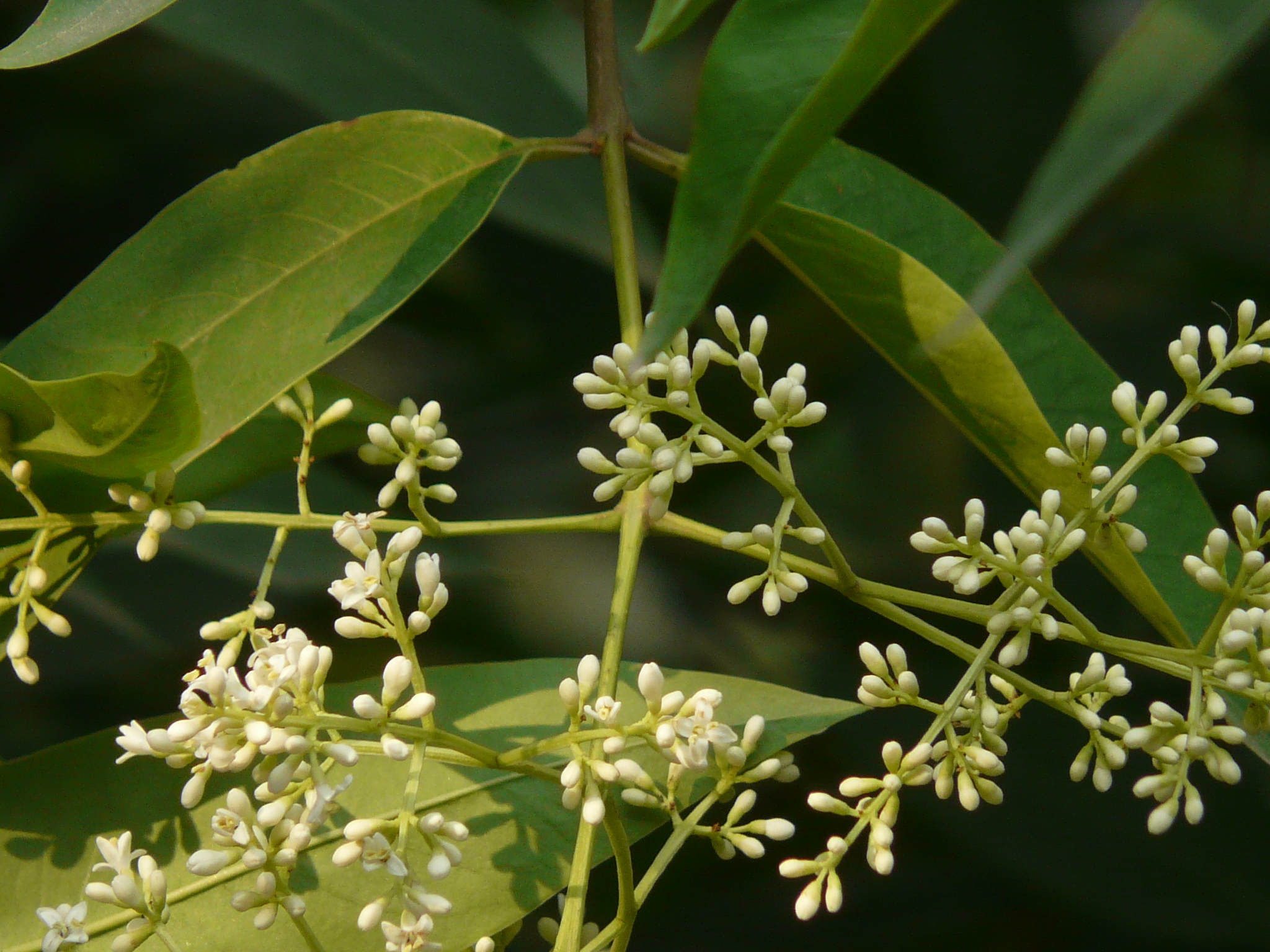
Moulmein Cedar

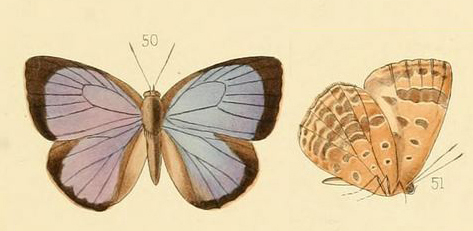
The plain tailless oakblue butterfly discovered by William Hewitson in Moulmein in 1869.

== Culture ==
Mawlamyine provides a multicultural dimension despite a Buddhist Mon majority. Buddhist cultural dominance is as old as Mawlamyine, but the British annexation and American missionaries in the early 19th century introduced Christianity. Many of the relics of the British Raj remain along with Hindu temples, Chinese temples, mosques and even a slice of Americana, reflecting Mawlamyine's great diversity.

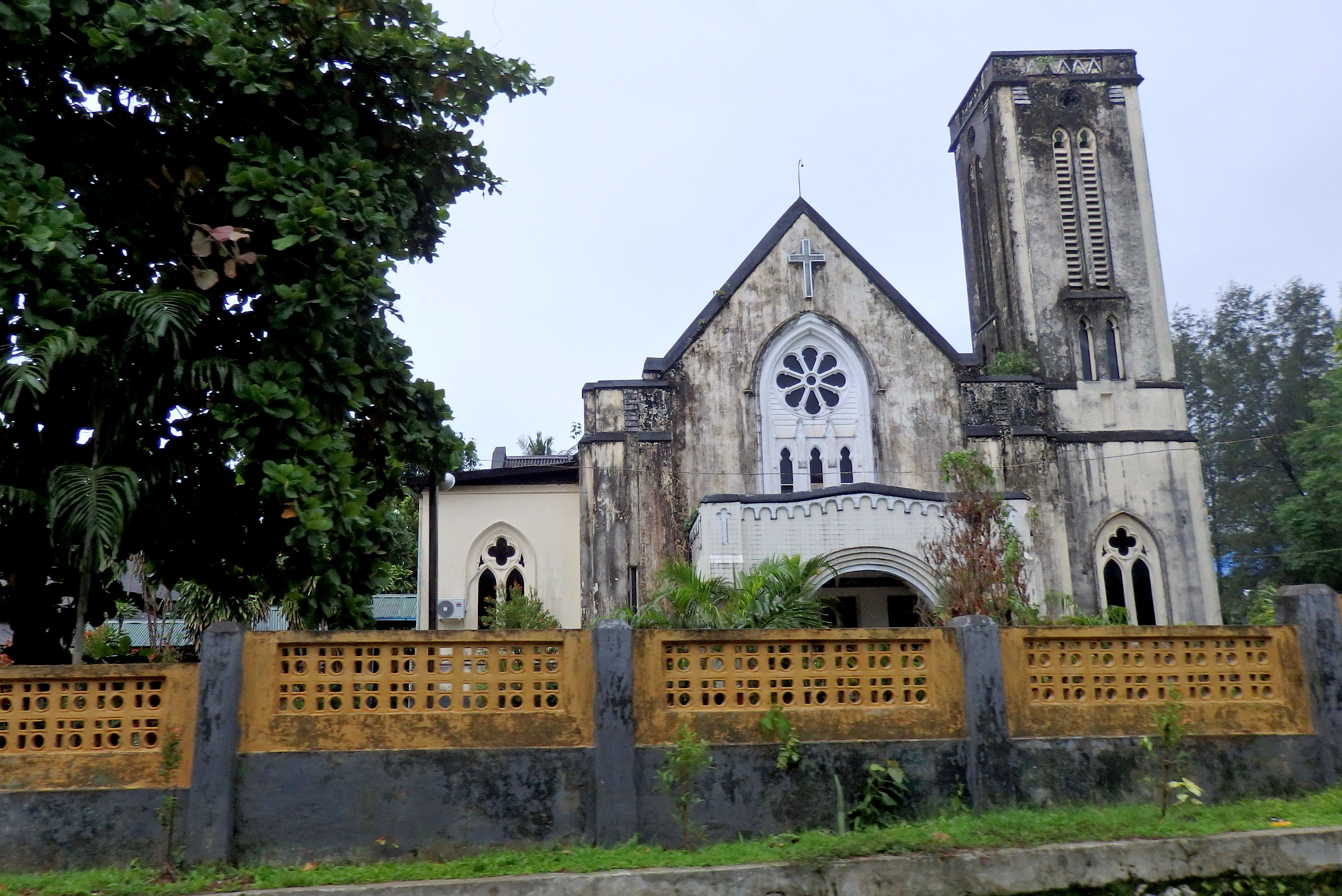
196-year old First Baptist Church

The First Baptist Church in Mawlamyine was constructed in 1827 by the legendary Adoniram Judson, the first Caucasian Protestant missionary sent from North America to Myanmar. The building is a masterful blend of Western and local elements, with the materials and building technology speaking directly to Mon cultural traditions and crafts expertise. In 2015, the US Embassy in Myanmar announced that it gave an award of $125,000 to World Monuments Fund (WMF) to restore the historic First Baptist Church in Mawlamyine through the Ambassadors Fund for Cultural Preservation.

The Mon State Cultural Museum exhibits the ancient cultural relics of Mon people and divans used by a Konbaung princess who resided in Mawlamyine.

== Education ==
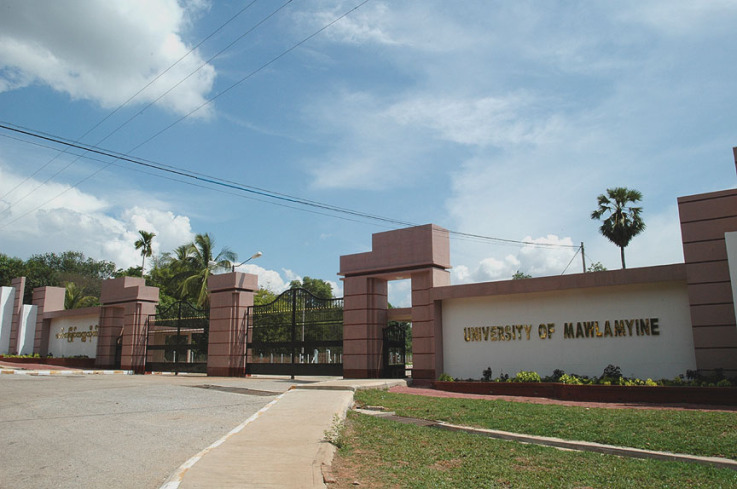
University of Mawlamyine

Mawlamyine has 13 public high schools, two institutes, a college and three universities. The University of Mawlamyine, established in 1953, is the major university for the south eastern region and offers both bachelor's and master's degree programs in liberal arts and sciences. It is the third oldest Arts and Science university in the country after the University of Yangon (established 1878) and the University of Mandalay (established 1925). It is one of the few universities in Myanmar that offers a degree in marine science. Its Marine Science Laboratory in Setse, a coastal town about 83 km south of Mawlamyine, was the first of its kind in Myanmar. Technological University (Mawlamyine) offers technological and engineering courses. The Mawlamyine campus of Yezin Agricultural University, administered by Ministry of Agriculture, Livestock and Irrigation (MOALI), offers agriculture courses. Government Technical Institute (Mawlamyine) offers vocational engineering courses located in outskirts of the city. Mawlamyine Education College and Mawlamyine Institute of Education are also located in the city.

The St. Patrick's School (now B.E.H.S. No. 5), founded by the De La Salle Brothers in 1860; Morton Lane-Judson School (formerly Morton Lane Girls' School, now B.E.H.S No.6), founded in 1867; and Shin Maha Buddhaghosa National School (now B.E.H.S. No.9), founded in 1899, are a few of the oldest public high schools in Myanmar.

The first international student of Bucknell University, class of 1864, Maung Shaw Loo was the first Burmese physician of Western medicine and the first Burmese to study Western medicine in the United States.

== Sports ==
The 10,000-seat Yamanya Stadium is one of the main venues for local and regional football tournaments. The stadium is also a home for Southern Myanmar F.C., a Myanmar National League (MNL) football club.

== Health care ==
=== Public hospitals ===
- Mawlamyine Women and Children Hospital (former Ellen Mitchell Memorial Hospital)
- Mawlamyine General Hospital
- Mawlamyine Christian Leprosy Hospital
- Mawlamyine University Hospital
- Mawlamyine Traditional Medicine Hospital

== International relations ==
=== Sister cities ===
Mawlamyine established a Friendship City agreement with Fort Wayne, Indiana, United States in 2016. A student exchange program between Mawlamyine University and IPFW of Fort Wayne began in 2017.

=== Others ===
A primary road in Novena, Singapore, and a road (Solok Moulmein) in George Town, Malaysia were named after the city's old name, Moulmein.

== Gallery ==
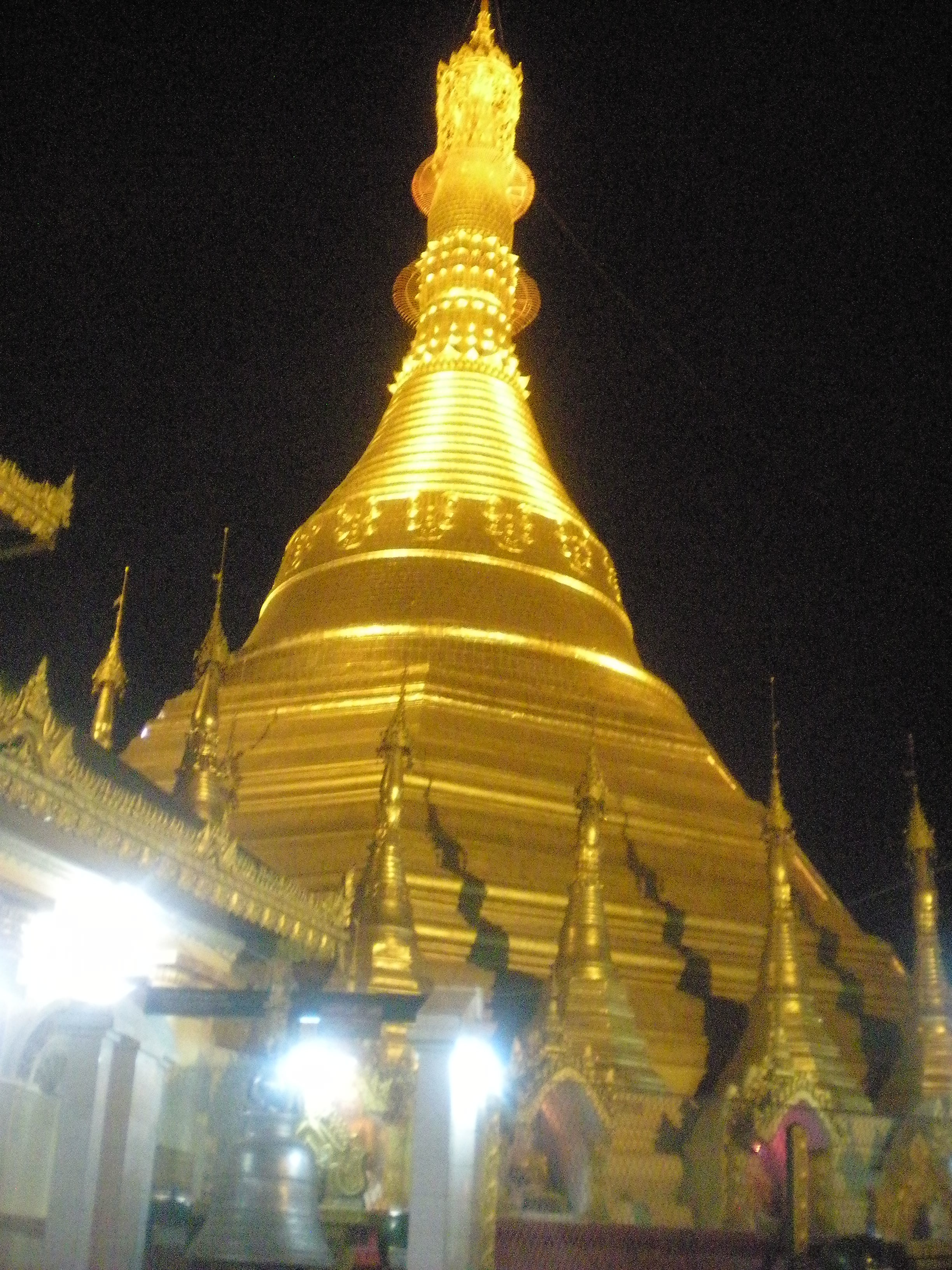
Kyaikthanlan Pagoda at night

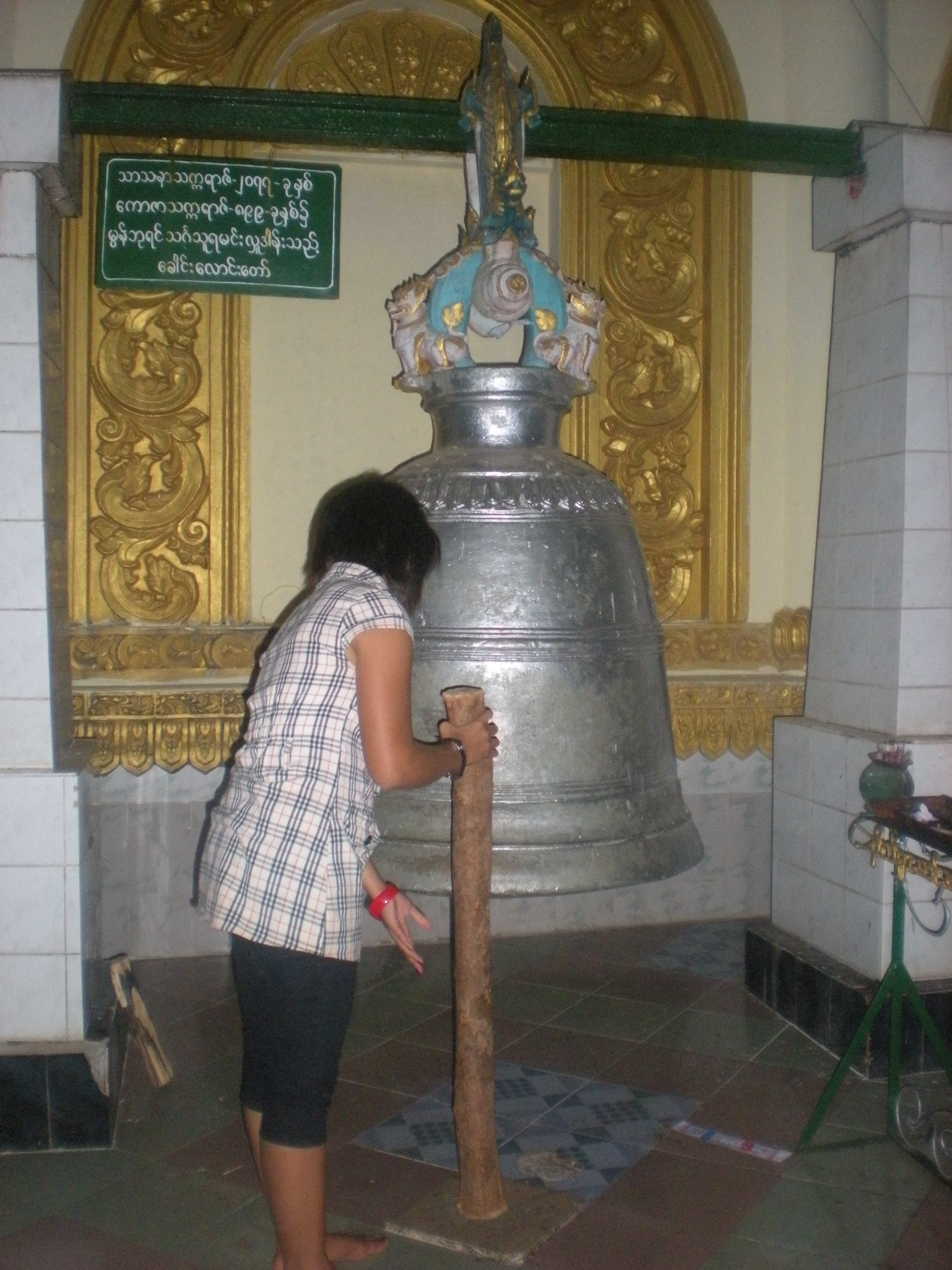
Old bell donated by Mon King in AD 1533

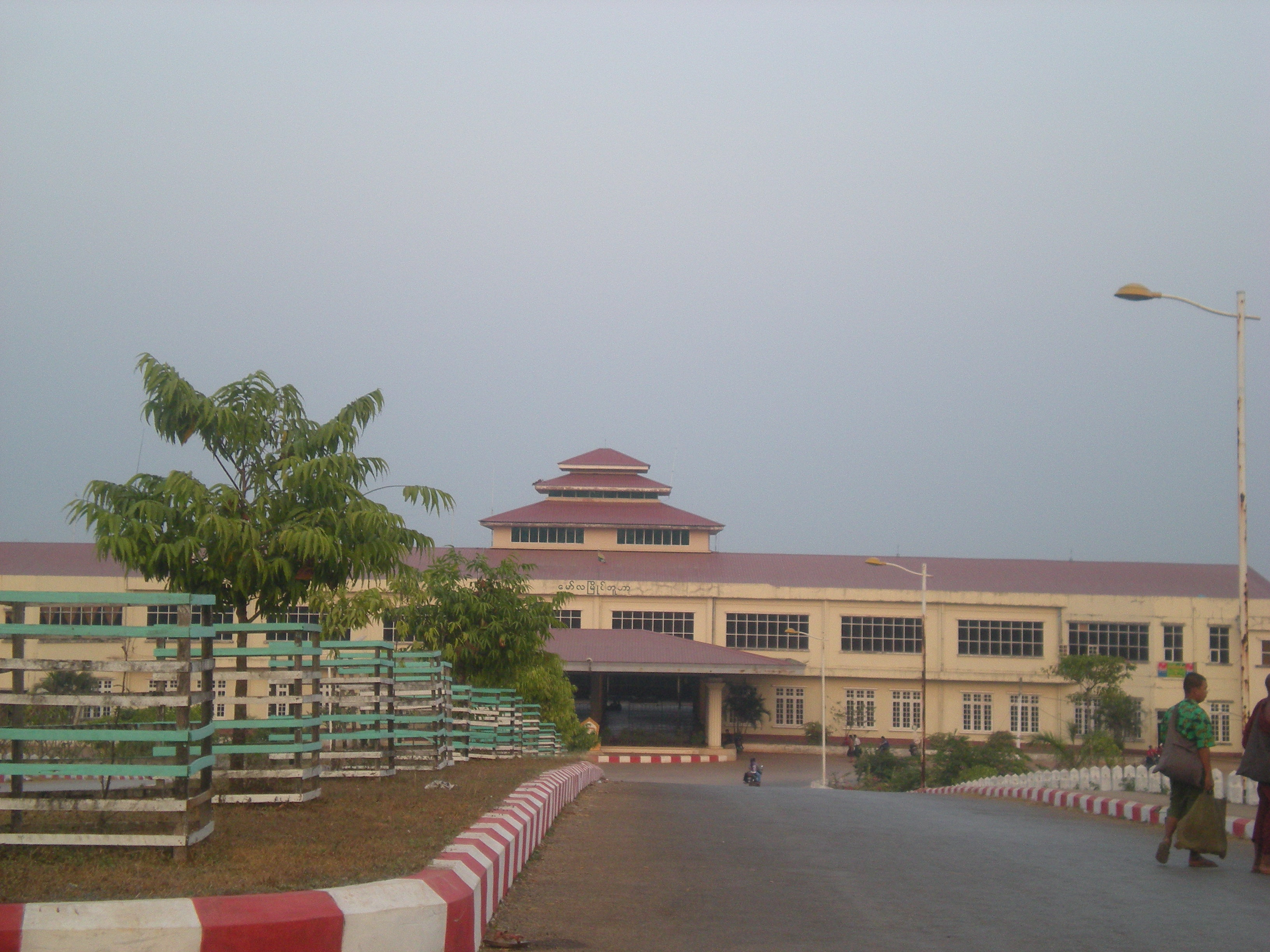
Mawlamyine Railway Station

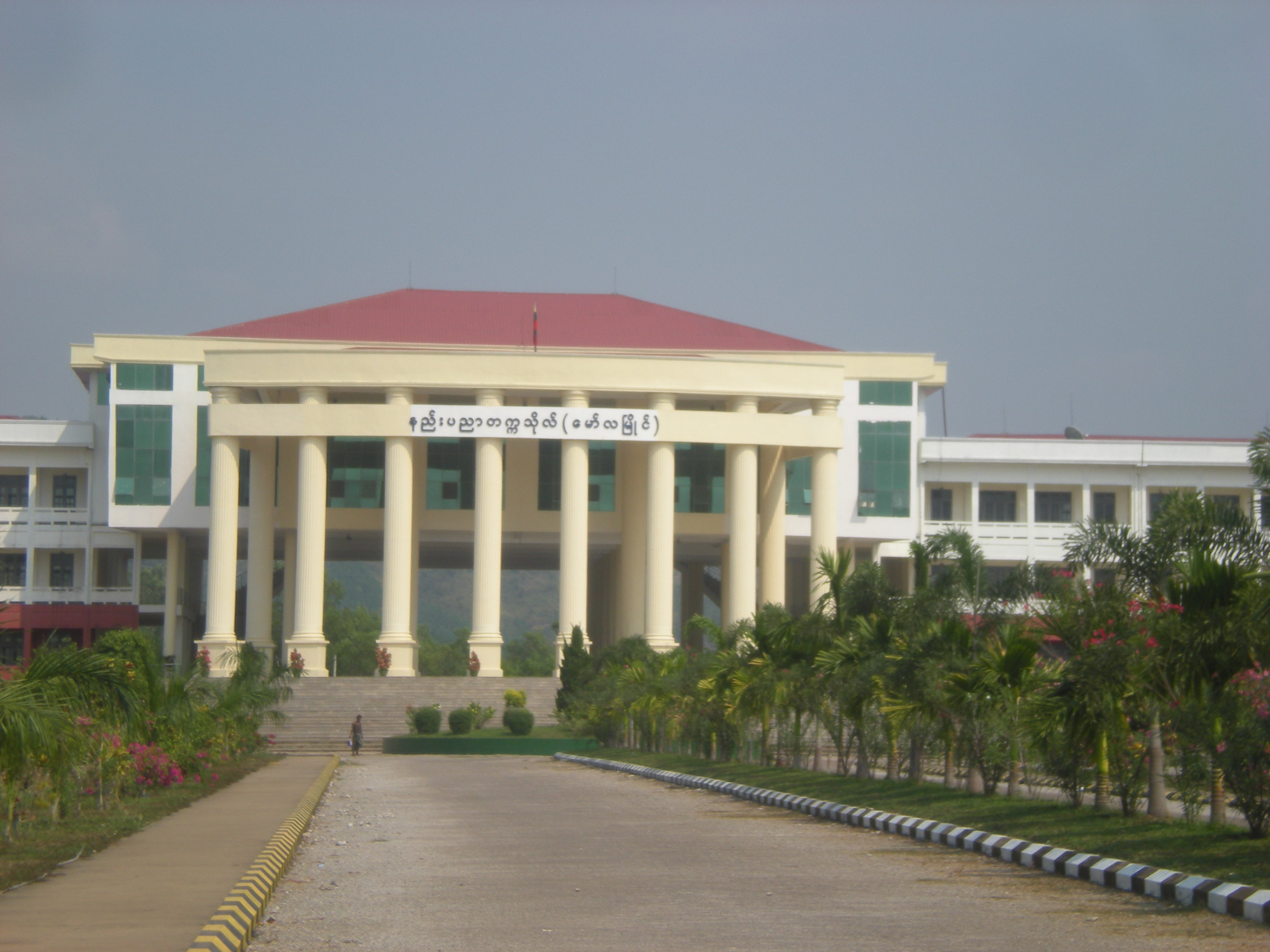
Technological University (Mawlamyine)

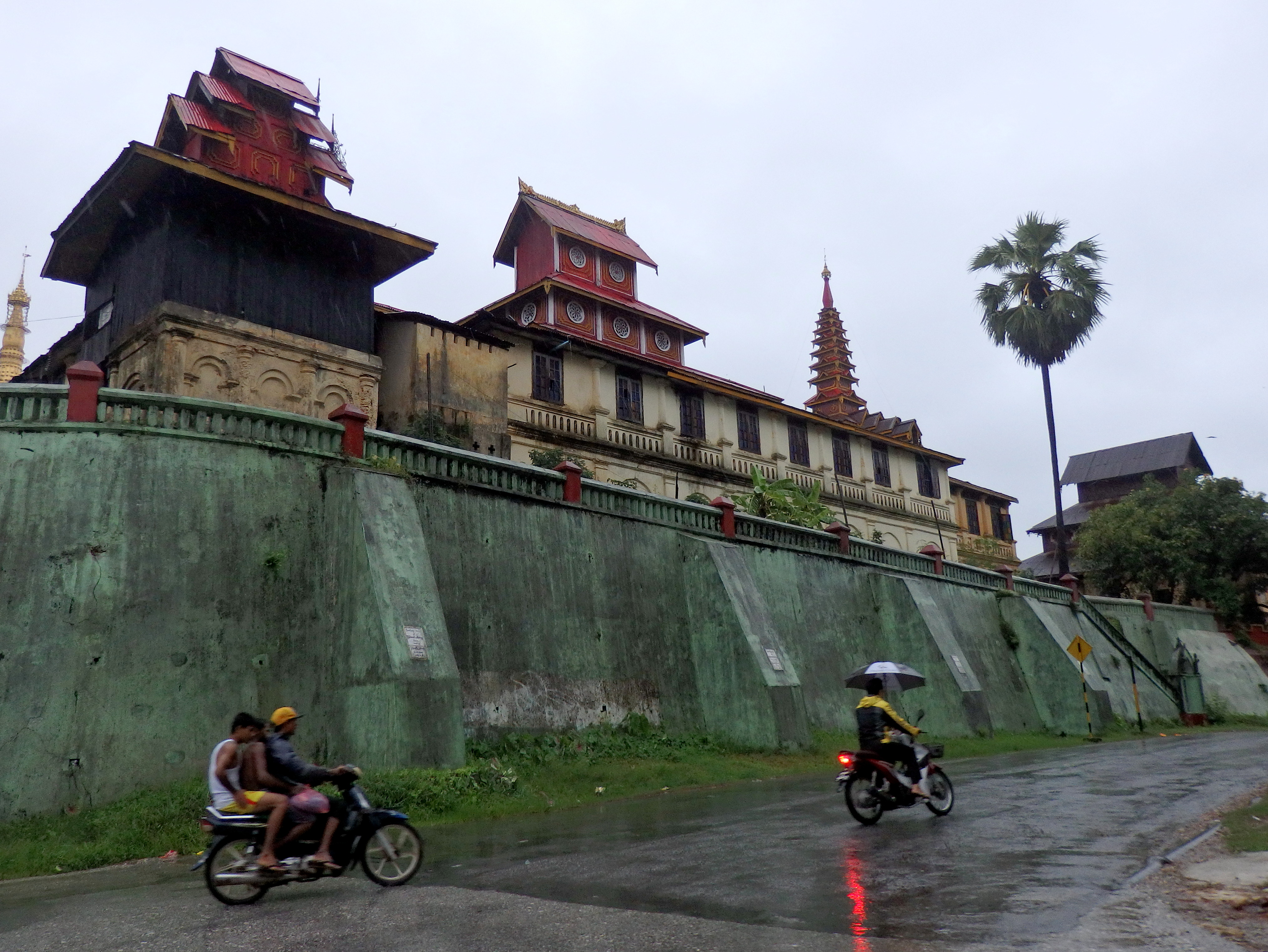
Queen Sein Don Monastery

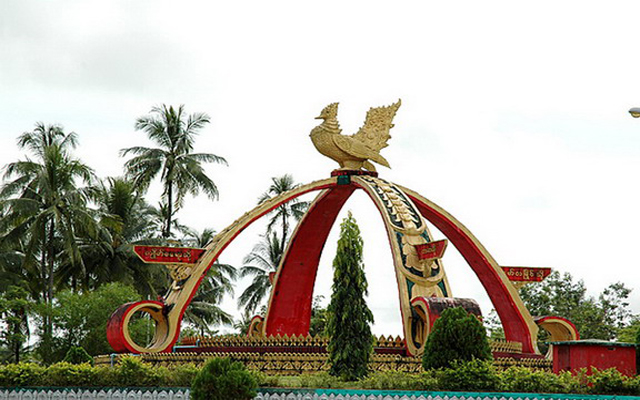
A roundabout in Mawlamyine

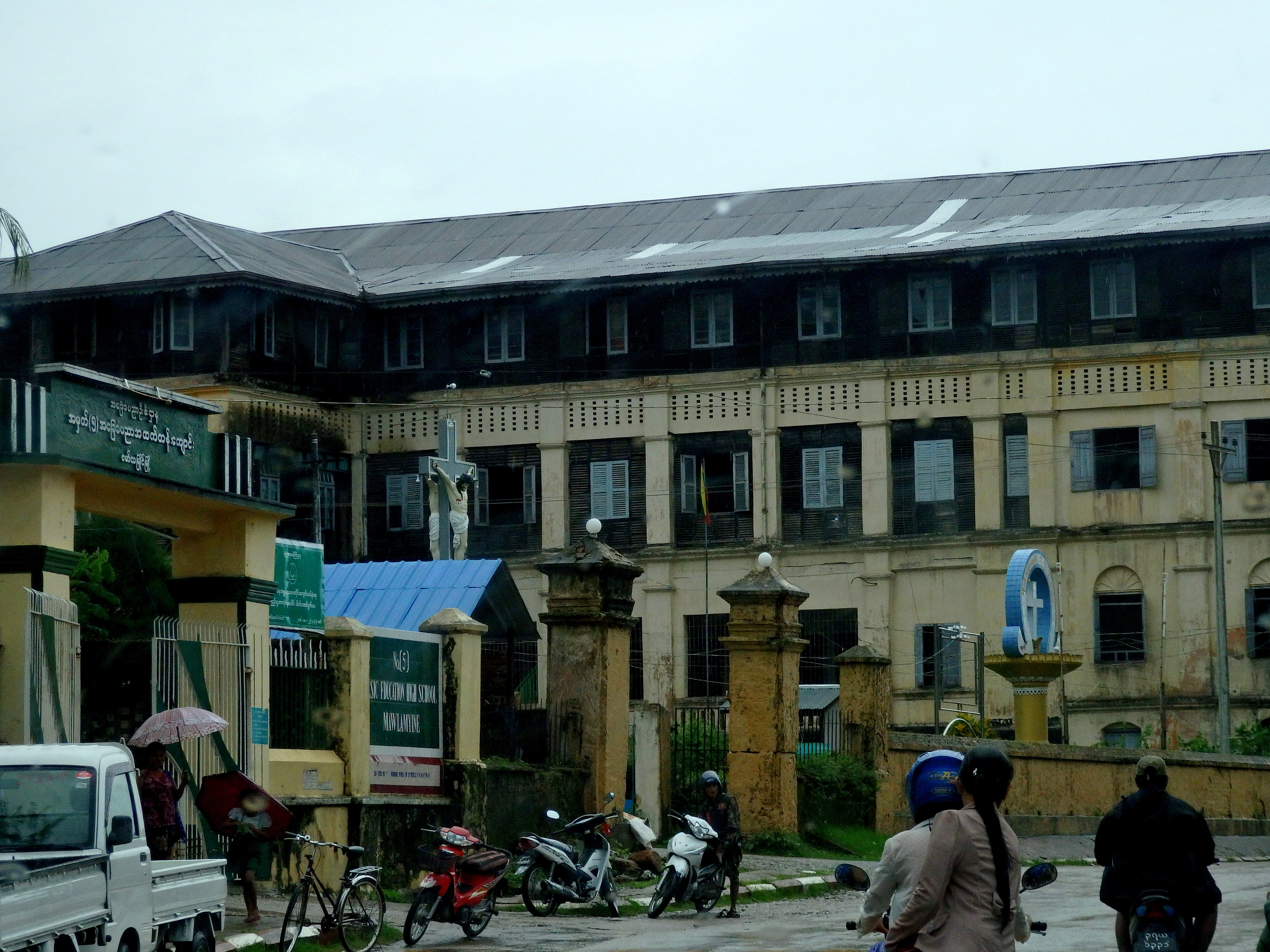
St Patrick's School (now BEHS 5)

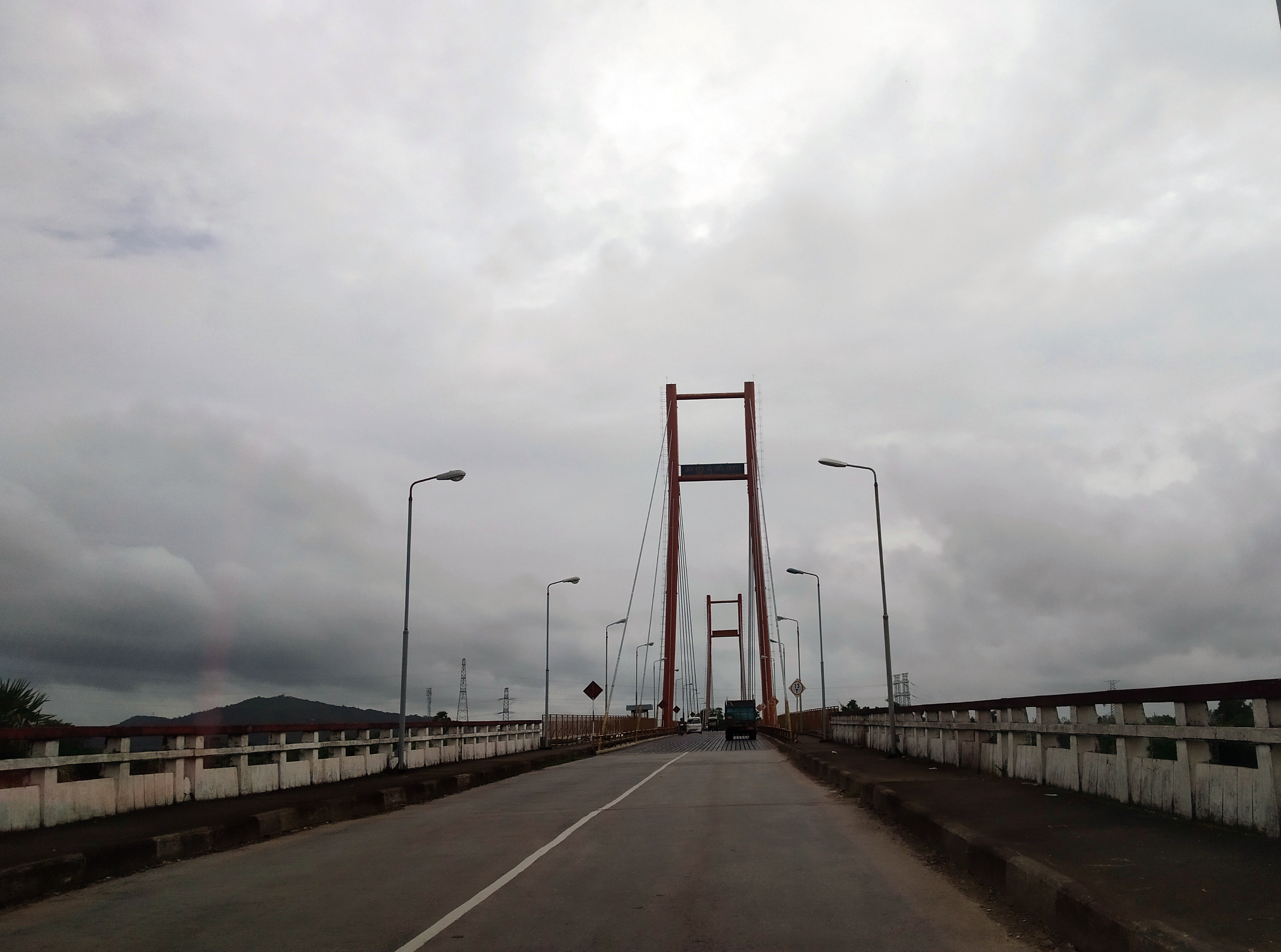
Attaran Suspension Bridge

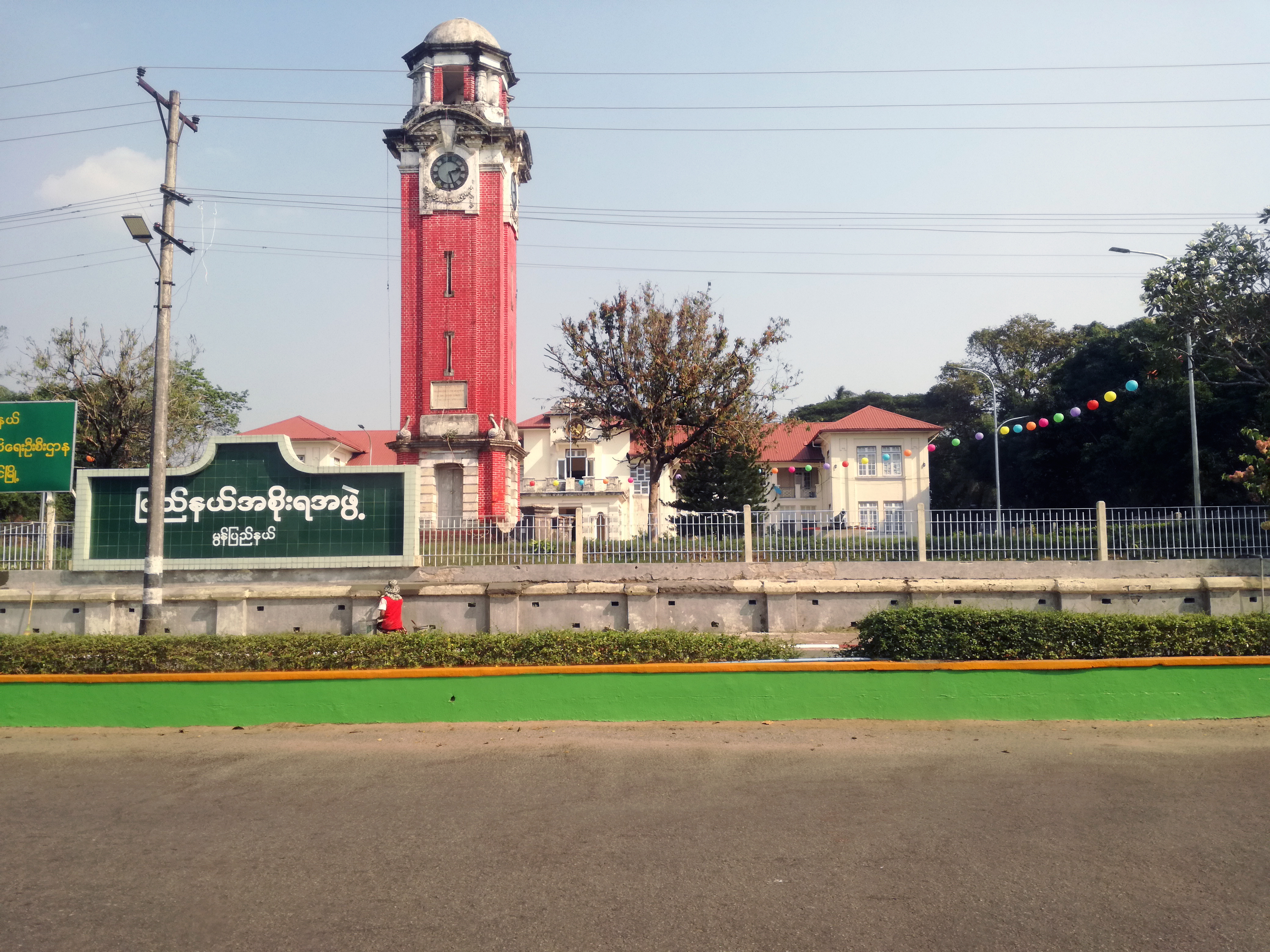
Victorian style clock tower (Mon State Government Office in the distance)

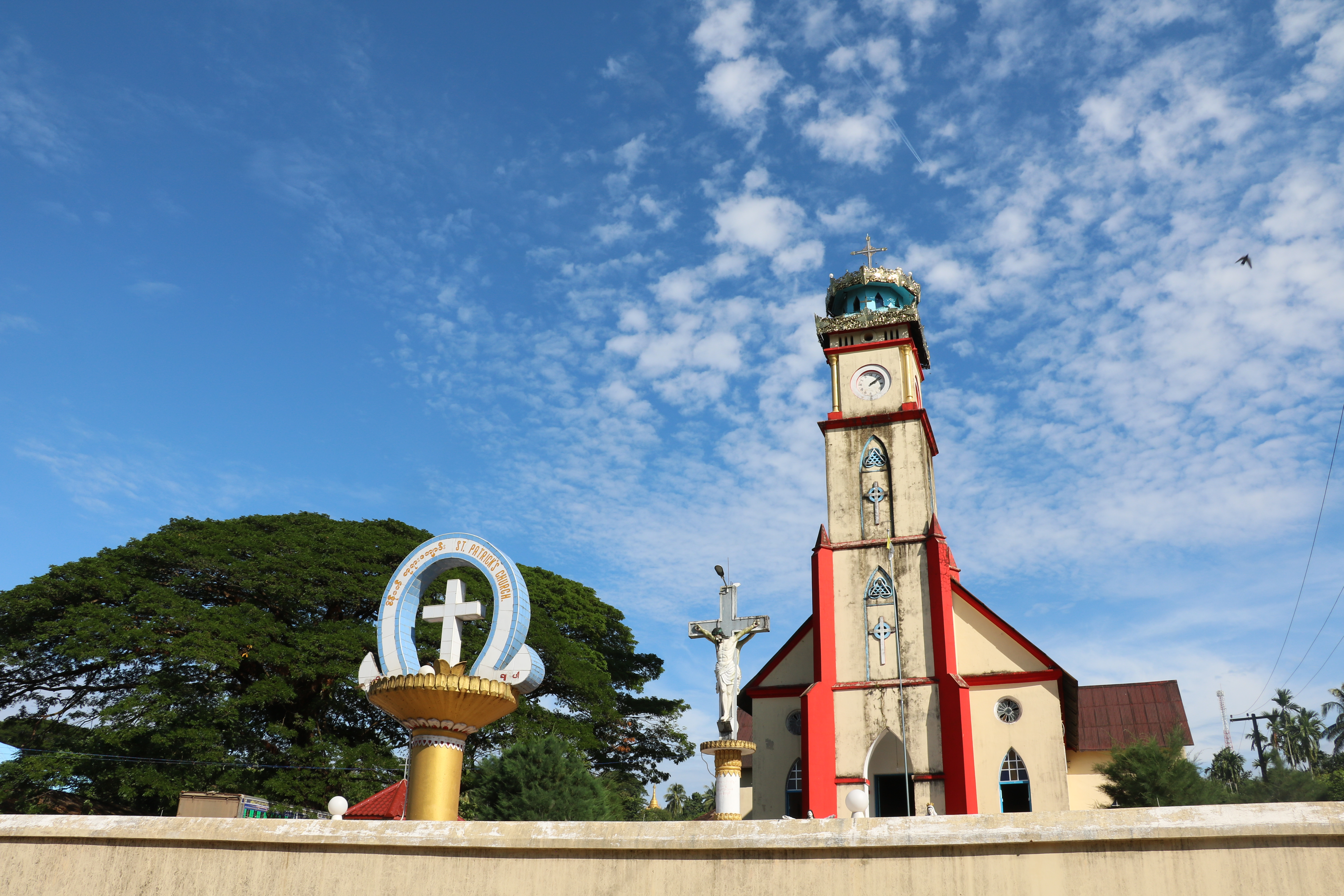
Saint Patrick Church (Mawlamyine)

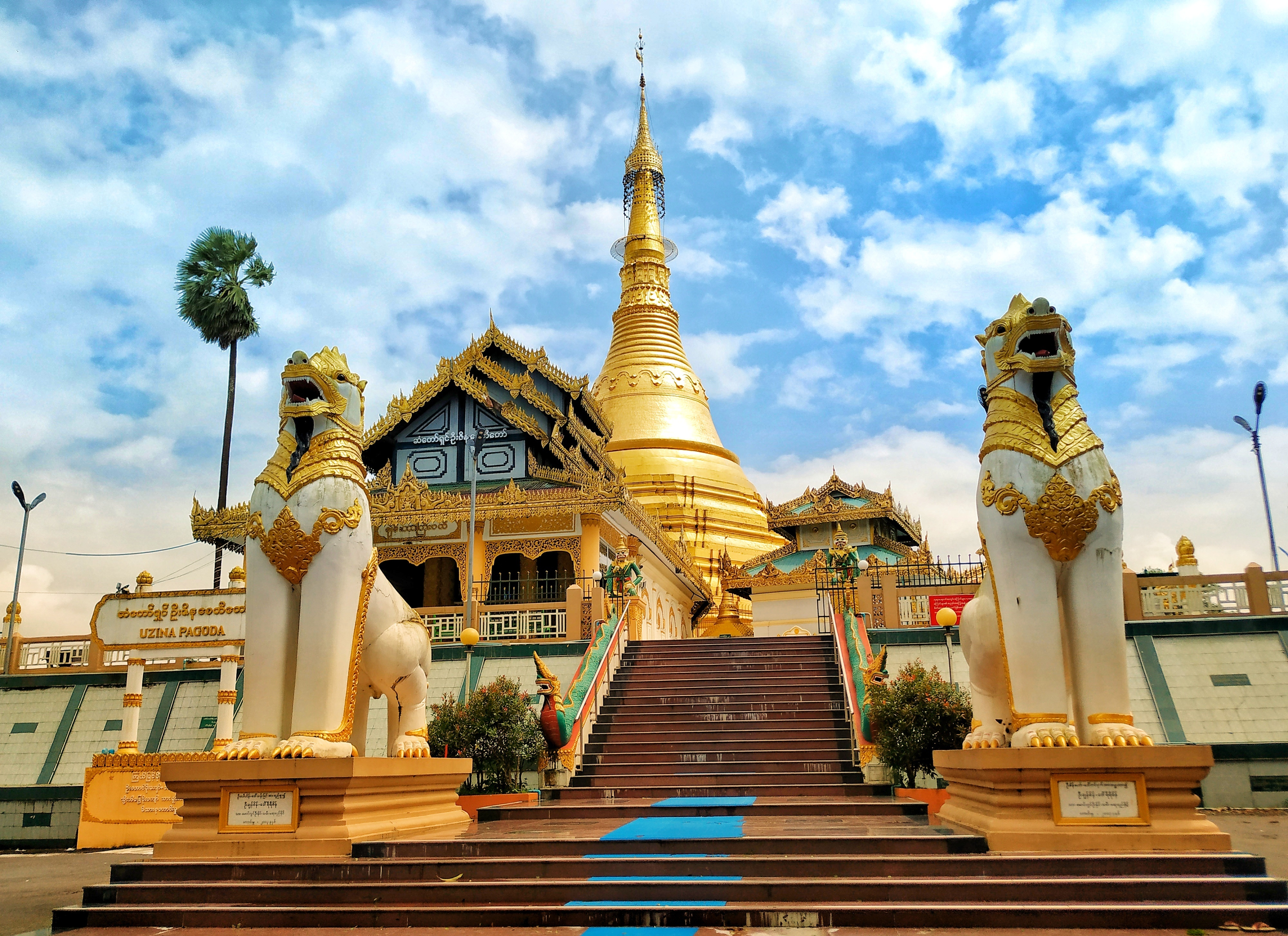
U-zina Pagaoda / Kyaik Pa-dhan pagoda

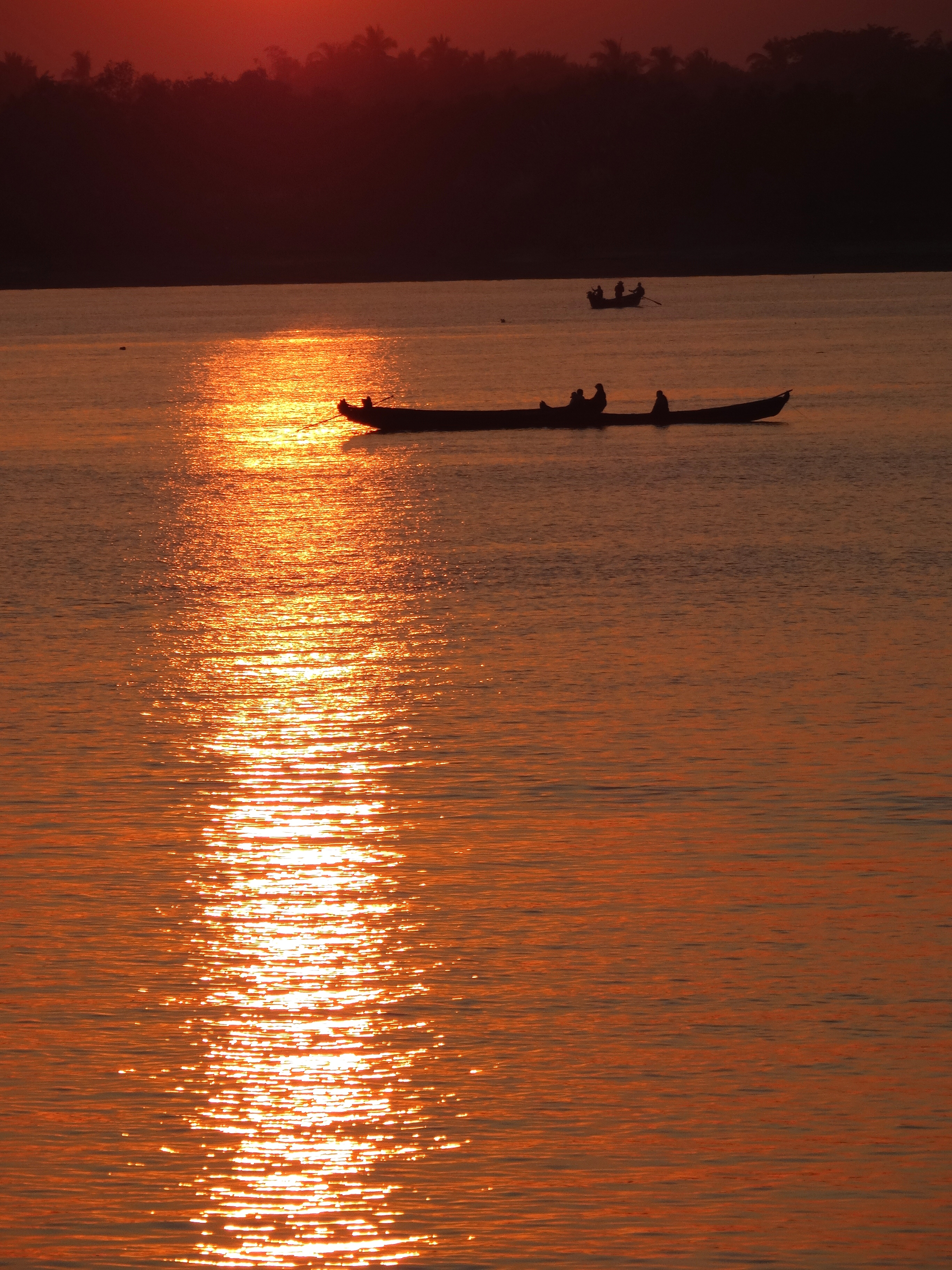
Sunset over Salween (Than Lwin) River

== See also ==
- Administrative divisions of Myanmar

Mawlamyine
Preceded by None	Capital of British Tenasserim; 24 February 1826 – 31 January 1862	Succeeded by Yangon
