= Yadanabonmyint Monastery =

Buddhist monastery in Mawlamyine, Myanmar

- ရတနာဘုံမြင့်ကျောင်း
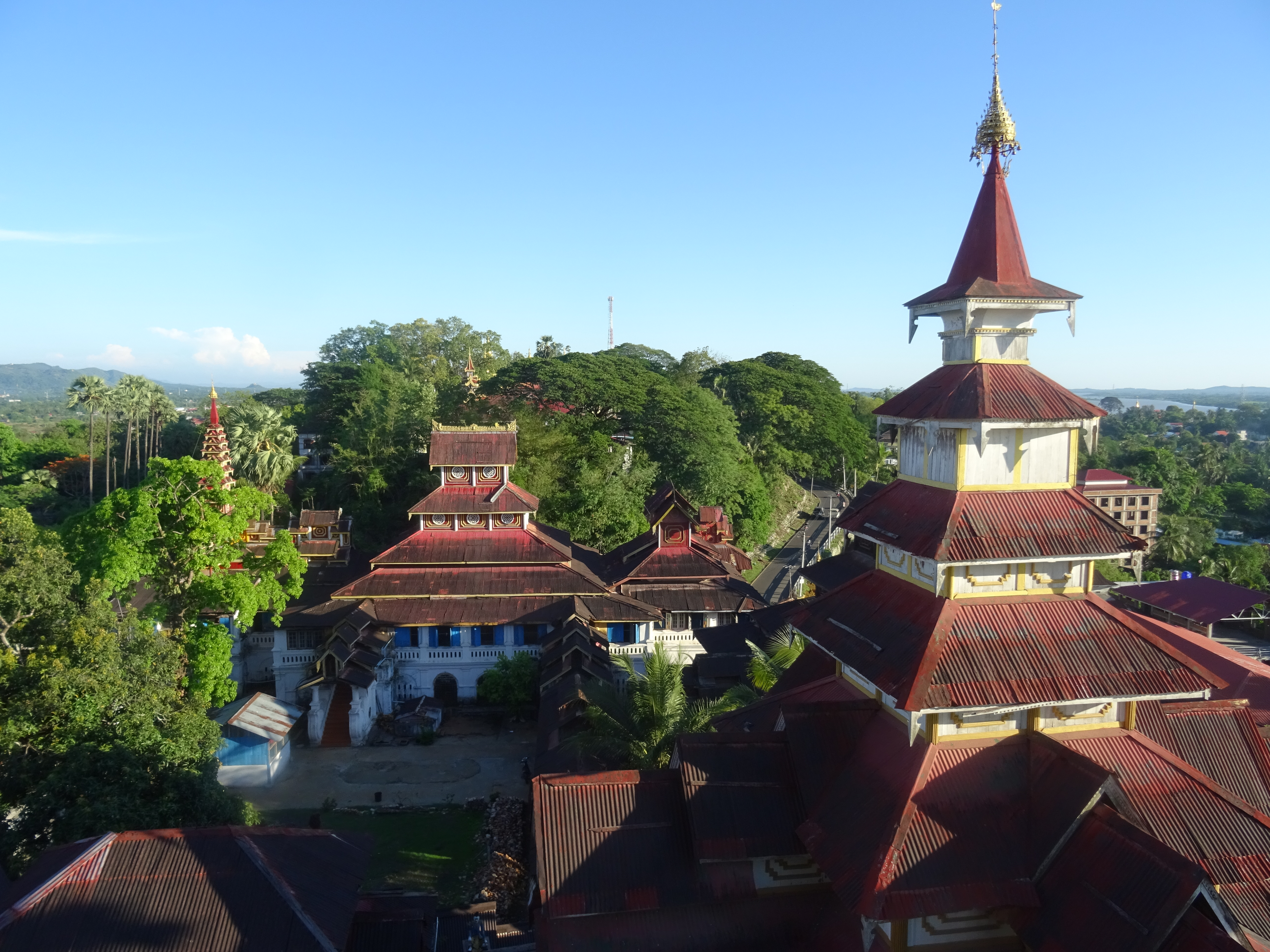

Religion
- Affiliation: Theravada Buddhism

Location
- Country: Mawlamyine, Mon State, Myanmar
- Interactive map of Yadanabonmyint Monastery
- Coordinates: 16.488113°N 97.628499°E

Architecture
- Founder: Seindon Mibaya
- Funded by: Shwe Pwint
- Completed: 1886; 140 years ago

Yadanabonmyint Monastery (Burmese: ရတနာဘုံမြင့်ကျောင်း), also known as the Queen Seindon Monastery (Burmese: စိန်တုံးမိဖုရားကျောင်း), is a historic Buddhist monastery in Mawlamyine, Mon State, Myanmar. The monastery was constructed under the guidance of Seindon Mibaya, a fourth ranking queen of King Mindon Min, and architects from Mandalay. The entire construction was funded by a wealthy lady called Daw Shwe Pwint. The monastery is known for its royal craftsmanship and motifs, and was formally consecrated in 1886 when it was donated to the Rama Sayadaw.

== See also ==
- Buddhism in Myanmar
