= Yangon Urban Mass Rapid Transit =

Metro system in Yangon, Myanmar

Overview
- Locale: Yangon, Myanmar
- Transit type: Rapid transit
- Number of lines: 1 (planned)
- Number of stations: 13

Operation
- Operation will start: 2027

Technical
- System length: 18 km (11.2 mi)
- Track gauge: 1,000 mm (3 ft 3 3/8 in)

The Yangon Urban Mass Rapid Transit (Burmese: ရန်ကုန်မြို့ပြလူထုရထားပို့ဆောင်ရေးစီမံကိန်း; YUMRT) is a proposed rapid transit system for Myanmar's largest city Yangon. The initial line is due for completion in 2027, becoming Myanmar's first rapid transit system.

== Background ==
An initial proposal in 2015 from the Japan International Cooperation Agency (JICA) envisioned two underground rail lines in Yangon along with a light rapid transit network. In April 2019, JICA was announced to be providing assistance to the Burmese Ministry of Transport regarding the project, which was then confirmed to consist of elevated lines.

== Network ==
The first line (လှိုင်သာယာ-ပါရမီလမ်းပိုင်း၌ ရန်ကုန်မိုးပျံရထားလမ်း) will consist of an 18 km (11.2 mi) elevated line from Hlaingthaya Township to Parami railway station. The proposed line will begin at Hlaingthaya station, cross the Hlaing River south of Bayinnaung Bridge, before reaching Okkyin railway station along Parami Road. Eventually the line will reach Toe Gyaung Ga Lay railway station.

== See also ==
- Rail transport in Myanmar
- Yangon Circular Railway
- Yangon Tram
- Yangon BRT
