= Yangon–Mawlamyine Railway =

Railway in Myanmar

Yangon–Mawlamyine Railway ရန်ကုန်-မော်လမြိုင် ရထားလမ်း
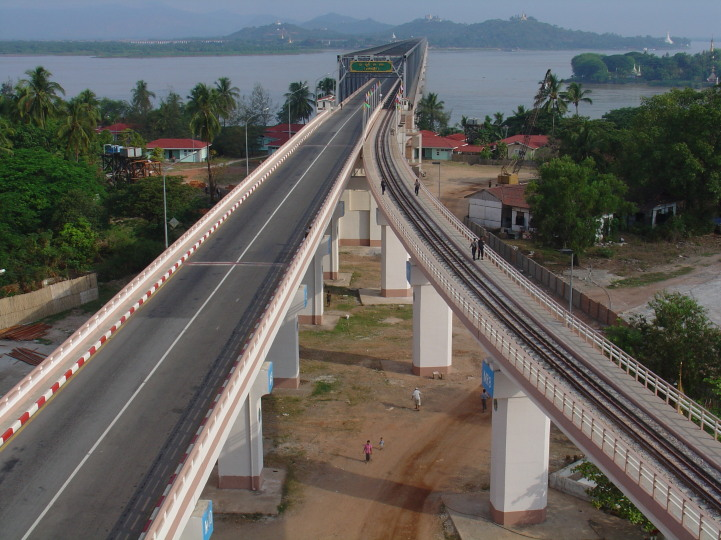

Overview
- Owner: Myanma Railways
- Locale: Yangon Region, Bago Region, Mon State

Operation
- Operator: Myanma Railways

Technical
- System length: 286.7 km (178.1 mi)
- Track gauge: 1,000 mm (3 ft 3 3/8 in)

Yangon–Mawlamyine Railway (Burmese: ရန်ကုန်-မော်လမြိုင် ရထားလမ်း) is a railway line in Myanmar and is operated by Myanma Railways.

== History ==
Between Rangoon and Bago was opened on February 27, 1884, and between Bago - Martaban was opened on October 12, 1907. In this time, the section crossing the Sittang River is the old line which ran via Nyaung Khar Shey. In 1962 the new line crossing the Sittang River was opened further north.

For nearly 80 years Tanintharyi Line remained isolated from the other railway lines in Myanmar due to Salween River. The section between Martaban and Moulmein was operated a ferry until 2006. On April 17, 2006, Thanlwin Bridge was opened crossing Salween River and the isolation was resolved.

Segment	length (km)	Date opened
Yangon - Bago	74.8	February 27, 1884
Bago - Mottama (the section between Ah Byar and Moke Pa Lin is the old line)	203.3	October 12, 1907
Ah Byar - Moke Pa Lin (The new line)		1962
Mottama - Mawlamyine	8.6	April 17, 2006

== Stations ==
- Yangon Central railway station
- Mawlamyine railway station
