= Mawlamyine railway station =

Railway station in Myanmar

Mawlamyine railway station မော်လမြိုင် ဘူတာ
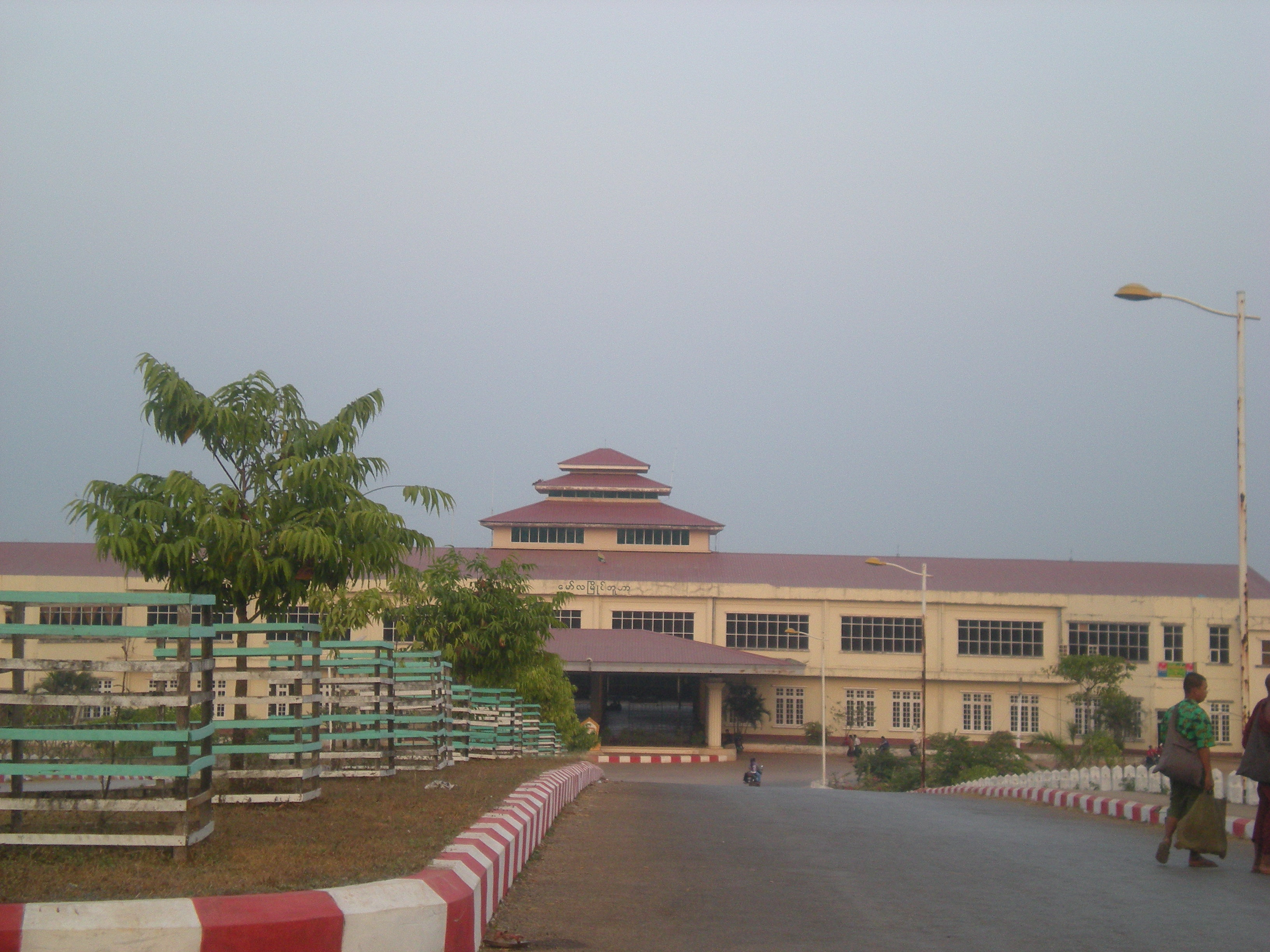
- Mawlamyine railway station

General information
- Location: Myenigon, Mawlamyine; Mon State, Myanmar
- Coordinates: 16°28′17″N 97°38′8″E
- Lines: Yangon–Mawlamyine Railway; Tanintharyi Line

History
- Rebuilt: 2006
Location

Mawlamyine railway station (Burmese: မော်လမြိုင် ဘူတာ) is a railway station located in Mawlamyine, Mon State, Myanmar on Myanmar Railways' Bago-Mawlamyine-Dawei line. The two-story station is 290 feet (88 m) long and 110 feet (34 m) wide, and has a total floor area of 638,000 square feet.

== History ==
During the British colonial era, the Moulmein railway station was the terminus of isolated Mawlamyine-Ye line on the Tanintharyi coast. The line from Yangon stopped at Mottama (Martaban), and passengers had to take a ferry over the Thanlwin River (Salween River) to Mawlamyine. Only in 2006, with the opening of the Thanlwin Bridge, did a direct link to the rest of the national rail network become possible. A new station, reportedly built to the standards of an "ASEAN railway station", was opened on 17 April 2006. The station is located in Myenigon, approximately 3 kilometres (1.9 mi) east of the city's main market, Zegyi.

== Service ==
The station is part of the country's 5,068-kilometre (3,149 mi) national rail network. Myanmar Railways, the country's sole railway operator, offers two trains services per day, the first leaving Yangon at 7:00 am and arriving Mawlamyine at 5:00 pm, and the next service leaving Yangon 10:00 am and arriving Mawlamyine at 9:00 pm. For the return journey back to Yangon, the morning service departs Mawlamyine at 6:00 am and arrives Yangon at 5:00 PM and the next train departs Mawlamyine at 8:30 am and arrives Yangon at 8:00 pm.
