= Pyinmana–Myingyan Railway =

Railway line in Myanmar

Pyinmana–Myingyan Railway ပျဉ်းမနား-မြင်းခြံ ရထားလမ်း

Overview
- Owner: Myanma Railways
- Locale: Naypyidaw Union Territory, Magway Region, Mandalay Region

Operation
- Began operation: 1997
- Operator: Myanma Railways

Technical
- System length: 329.2 km (204.6 mi)
- Track gauge: 1,000 mm (3 ft 3 3/8 in)

Pyinmana–Myingyan Railway (Burmese: ပျဉ်းမနား-မြင်းခြံ ရထားလမ်း) is a railway line in Myanmar. Operated by Myanma Railways.

== History ==
In 1922, the construction began the section between Pyinmana and Satthwa across the Pegu Range, and the section was opened in 1925. The section from Satthwa to Kyaukpadaung via Taungdwingyi was opened in 1930.

During the World War II, the line between Taungdwingyi and Kyaukpadaung was removed by Imperial Japanese Armed Forces. After the independence of Burma, this section was rehabilitated by 1969.

In the 1990s, the military junta began a tourism campaign, and a plan which build a railway connecting between Kyaukpadaung and Myingyan via Nyaung-U (located 8km east of Bagan) was launched at the same time. This section opened in the late 1990s.

On 31 December, 2011, Pakokku Bridge across the Irrawaddy River was opened.

Segment	length (km)	Date opened
Pyinmana - Satthwa	92.9	April, 1925
Satthwa - Taungdwingyi	14.9	December, 1926
Taungdwingyi - Kyaukpadaung	115.6	July 17, 1930
Bagan - Myingyan	55.7	September 18, 1996
Kyaukpadaung - Bagan	50.1	February 11, 1997
