= Hlawga railway station =

Railway station in Yangon, Myanmar

Coordinates: 16°59′55″N 96°04′34″E

Hlawga လှော်ကားဘူတာ
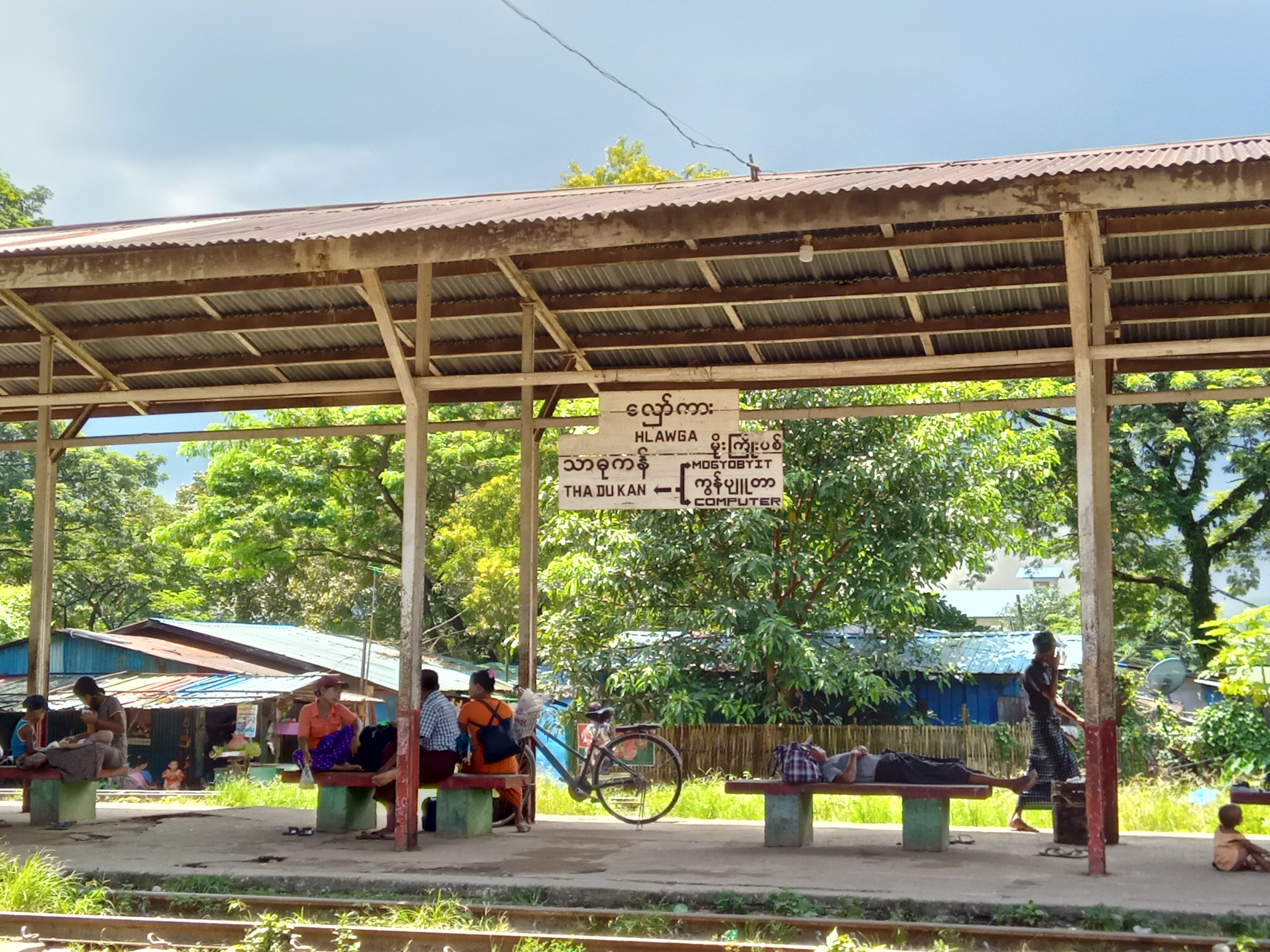
- People waiting at the Hlawga station, 2023

General information
- Location: Yangon, Myanmar
- Operator: Myanmar Railways
- Line: Yangon-Pyay Line
Location

Hlawga railway station is a railway station on the Yangon–Pyay Railway in Yangon, Myanmar.
