= Tanintharyi Line =

Railway line in Myanmar

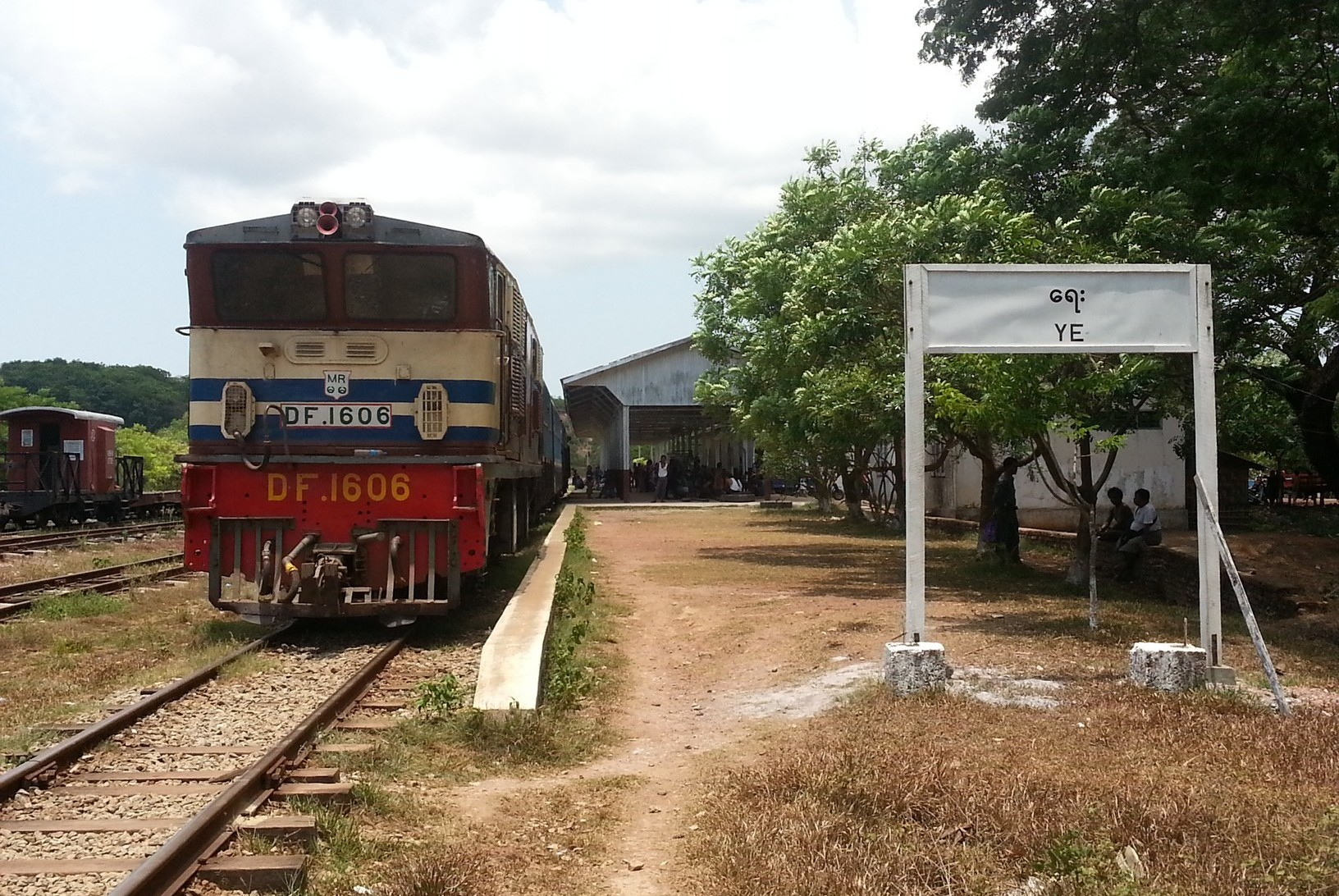
A train at Ye Station

Tanintharyi Line is a 1,000 mm (3 ft 3 3/8 in) gauge railway line in Myanmar's southernmost region, Tanintharyi Region, operated by Myanma Railways. The line runs from Mawlamyine Railway Station (Moulmein) to the Dawei area, with connections to Yangon Central Railway Station, it is under construction extending towards Myeik from the current terminus of Thayetchaung Station, which lies just after Dawei Station. Current section in operation includes the part from Mawlamyaing Station to Dawei. A pair of trains runs daily between Yangon and Dawei. In addition, two pairs of trains operate between Yangon and Mawlamyaing. The journey along the entire route takes approximately 24 hours.

== History ==
1994 saw the start of construction of the initially isolated 160 km (99 mi) Ye-Dawei (Tavoy) railway, completed March 1998. It was built using forced labor, drawn up from surrounding communities. This was later joined to the route north at Ye by the new 250 m (270 yd) road/rail bridge across the Ye River, opened November 2003. In April 2008, the tracks were extended across the 2.4 km (1.5 mi) Thanlwin Bridge, a road/rail bridge located in Moulmein, provision having been made in its design when it was opened a few years earlier. This allowed the long isolated section south to Ye and later Dawei (Tavoy) to receive trains from the north of the country. A 20-mile extension to Thayetchaung Station was opened to traffic in June 2011.

== Stations ==
Thanlwin River Bridge at Mawlamyaing

Mawlamyaing (Moulmein) station

Line at Thanbyuzayat

Ye station

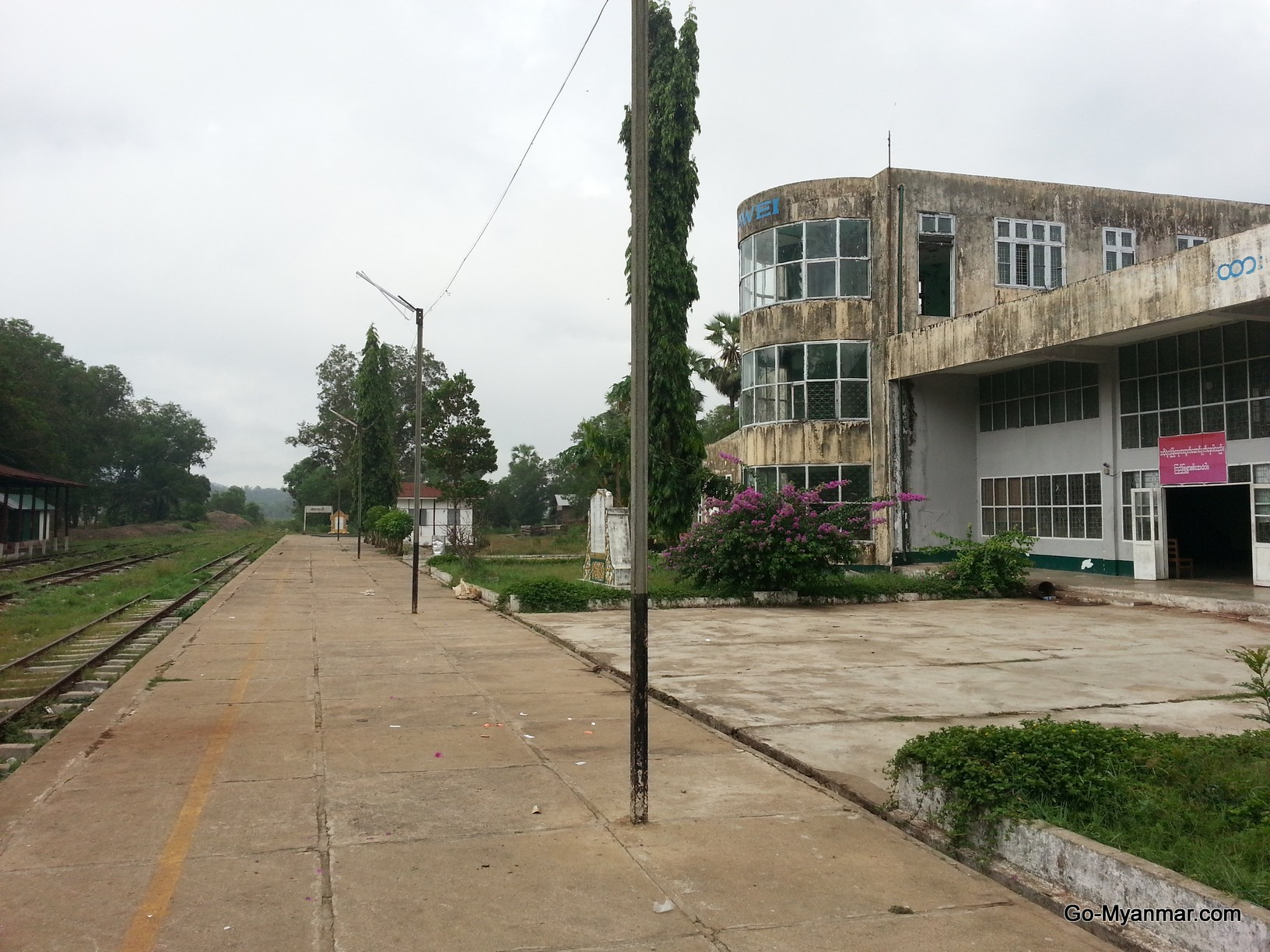
Dawei (Tavoy) station

- Yangon Central Railway Station
- Bago
- Thanlwin River Bridge (Mawlamyaing Bridge)
- (24) Mawlamyaing (Old Station) 178
- (25) Mawlamyaing 182 1/4
- (26) Kawt Kha Ni 185 3/4
- (27) Hpar Auk 189
- (28) Hmein Ga Nein 194
- (29) Mudon 197 1/2
- (30) Taw Ku 202 1/2
- (31) Ka Mar Wet 206
- (32) Ka Lawt Thawt 209
- (33) Kun Hlar 213 1/2
- (34) Thanbyuzayat 217 1/4 (Junction to Payathonzu)
- (35) Pa Nga 223 1/4
- (36) Ka Yoke Pi 226
- (37) An Khe 229 1/2
- (38) Htin Shu 233 1/2
- (39) Ah Nin 239 1/2
- (40) Hnit Kayin 246
- (41) Lamaing 252
- (42) Taung Bon 258
- (43) Paing Wan 261 1/4
- (44) Pa Yan Maw -
- (45) Pa Laing Kee 266 1/4
- (46) Ye 271 1/2
- Ye River Bridge
- (47) Chaung Taung 272/11 (with very small ? Ø 20 feet turntable)
- (48) Kalawt Kyi -
- (49) Koe Maing 279/19
- (50) Pauk Pin Kwin 288/5
- (51) Nat Kyi Zin 296/23
- (52) Sein Bon 299.62
- (53) Yae Ngan Gyi 301.77
- (54) Sin Swei 303.17
- (55) Min Tha 308/22
- (56) Hsin Ku 309.70
- (57) Ein Da Ra Za 318/22
- (58) Gan Gaw Taung 320
- (59) In Hpya -
- (60) Kalein-Aung 333/0
- (61) Yae Pone -
- (62) Hein Ze 341/20
- (63) Tha Ke Kwa 350/6
- (64) Dauk Lauk -
- (65) Yebyu 362/19
- (66) Nyin Htway 365/13
- (67) Maung Mei Shaung 368/?
- (68) Za Har 371/0
- (69) Dawei 373/12

=== Under construction ===
Subsequent plans called for the extension of the line south of Dawei: a 31 km (19 mi) section to Thayetchaung opened on June 4, 2011, and construction continued southward from there before the project was halted in 2014.Today Dawei station is the southernmost operational station on the Myanma Railways network.

- Thayetchaung 393
- Palaw
- Myeik

== Future ==
It is expected to become a part of a pan-Asian railway network, allowing spur connections specifically to Thailand. A connection (95 km as the crow flies) between the SRT railhead at Nam Tok railway station in Kanchanaburi Province to Dawei Station through the mountains underwent preparatory surveying in 2017, funded by the Japan Internation Cooperation Agency.
