= Insein railway station =

Railway station in Yangon, Myanmar

Coordinates: 16°53′06.0″N 96°06′25.4″E

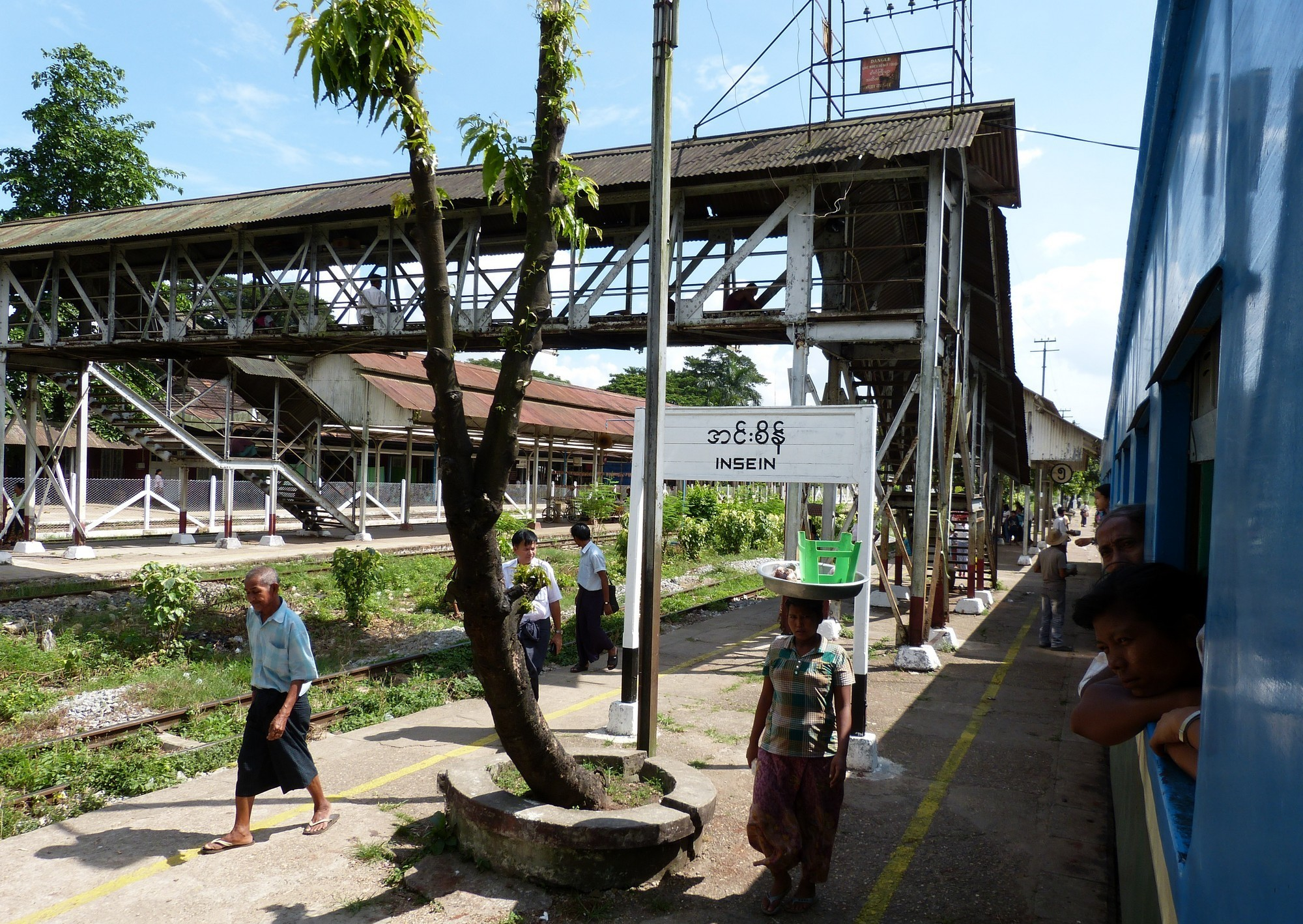
Insein railway station

Insein railway station (Burmese: အင်းစိန်ဘူတာ) is a railway station on the Yangon Circular Railway in Yangon, Burma. It is one of the busiest railway stations in the country and serves as a gateway for commuters traveling to and from Yangon (Lonely Planet, n.d.). The station was built during the British colonial period in the early 20th century and was designed in a typical colonial architectural style (Myanmar Railways, n.d.). The station is located on the main line of the Myanmar Railways network and is an important junction for trains heading to various parts of the country (Lonely Planet, n.d.).

Insein railway station is equipped with modern amenities such as waiting rooms, ticket counters, toilets, and food stalls (Myanmar Railways, n.d.). The station has multiple platforms and can accommodate several trains simultaneously (Lonely Planet, n.d.). The station is also wheelchair accessible, making it easy for passengers with disabilities to travel (Myanmar Railways, n.d.).The station is an important transportation hub in Yangon, and thousands of commuters use it daily to travel to work, school, or other destinations (Lonely Planet, n.d.). The station is particularly busy during the morning and evening rush hours when people are traveling to and from work (Myanmar Railways, n.d.).

Insein railway station also serves as a connection point for travelers heading to other destinations in Myanmar, such as Mandalay, Bagan, and Naypyidaw (Lonely Planet, n.d.). Many long-distance trains stop at Insein on their way to these destinations (Myanmar Railways, n.d.).
