= Satthwa, Magway Region =

Coordinates: 19°52′21″N 95°33′56″E

Satthwa, also known as Sat Thwar, is a village tract in Taungdwingyi Township, Magway Region, Myanmar.

== Transport ==
Since 1999 it has been served by a station on the Myanmar Railways Network.

== See also ==
- Transport in Myanmar
