= Yangon–Pyay Railway =

Rail route of Myanmar

Yangon–Pyay Railway ရန်ကုန်-ပြည် ရထားလမ်း
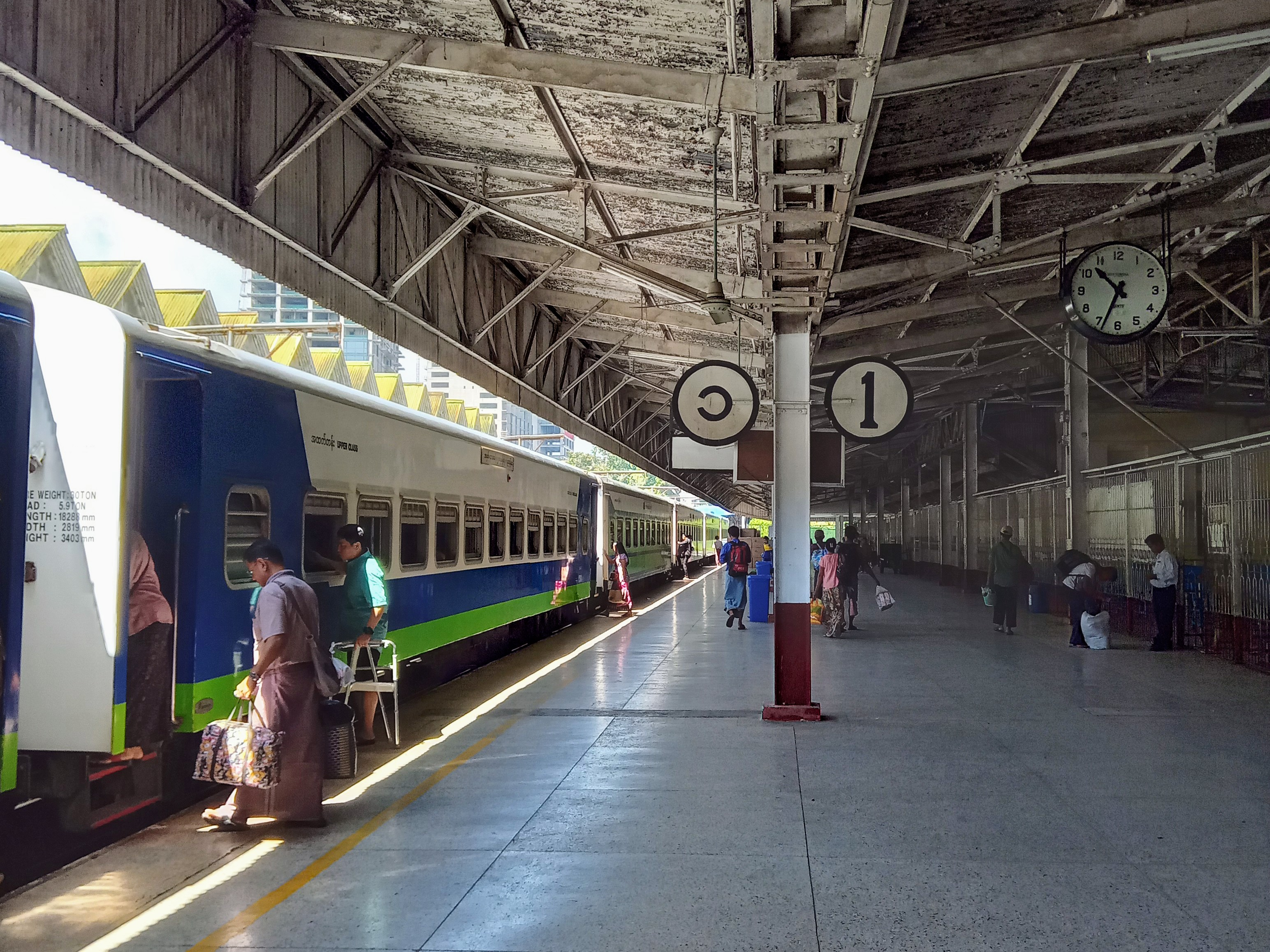

Overview
- Owner: Myanma Railways
- Locale: Yangon Region, Bago Region

Operation
- Began operation: May 1, 1877
- Operator: Myanma Railways

Technical
- System length: 158.9 km (98.7 mi)
- Track gauge: 1,000 mm (3 ft 3 3/8 in)

Yangon–Pyay Railway (Burmese: ရန်ကုန်-ပြည် ရထားလမ်း) is a railway line in Myanmar and is operated by Myanma Railways.

== History ==
Yangon-Pyay Railway Line was the first railway line to be constructed in Myanmar. While some sources suggest that the section between Yangon and Letpadan opened in 1869, most historical records indicate that the entire line was officially inaugurated on May 1, 1877, by the Irrawaddy State Railway. The construction of this line was relatively straightforward due to the flat terrain and the absence of significant gradients or major rivers to cross. Notably, the section from Yangon Station to Danyingon is double-tracked.

Segment	length (km)	Date opened
Yangon - Pyay	258.9	May 1, 1877

== Stations ==
- Yangon Central railway station
- Pyay railway station
