= Paywetseikkon railway station =

Railway station in North Okkalapa, Myanmar

Coordinates: 16°54′02.4″N 96°09′0.8″E

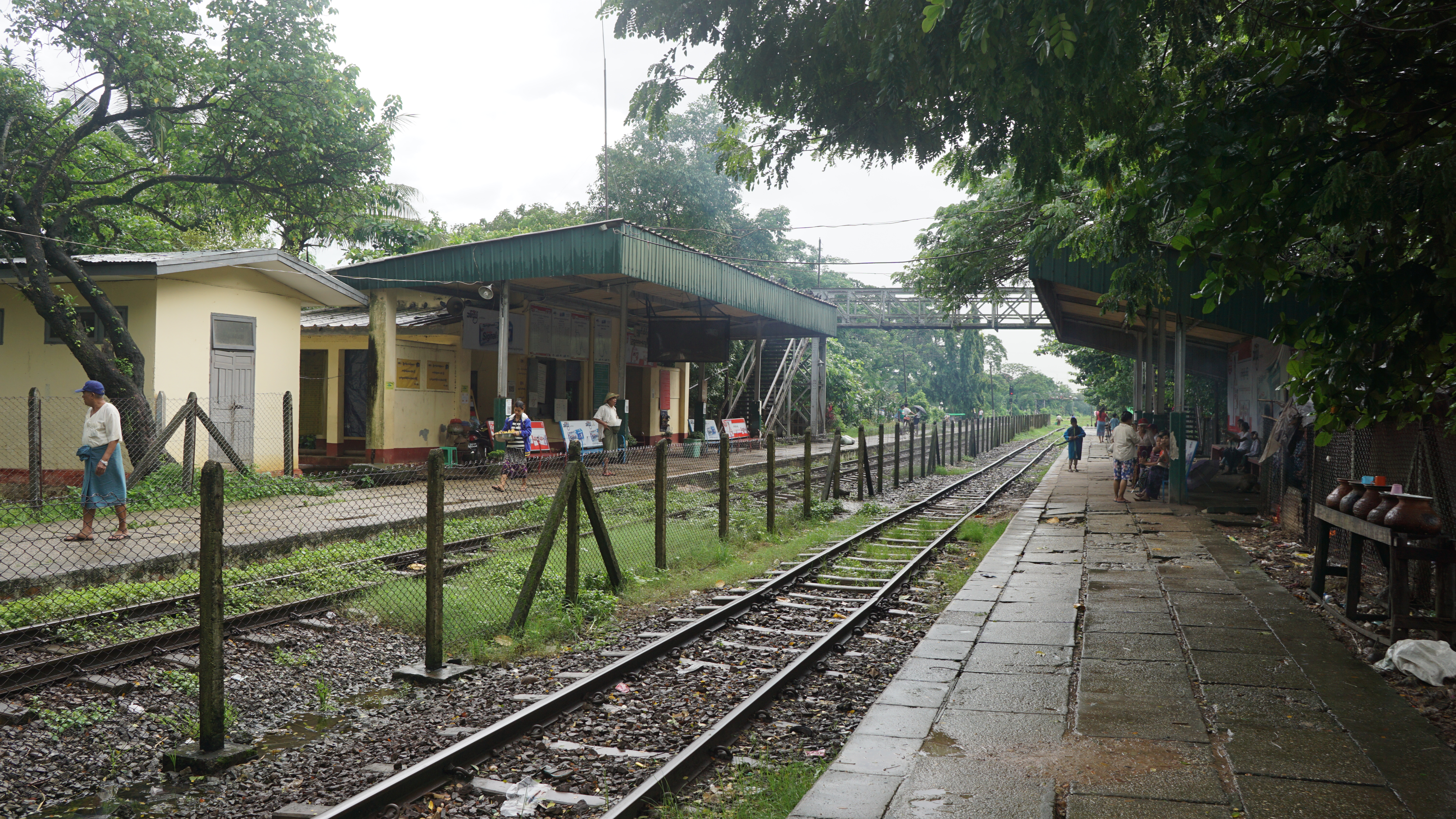
Paywetseikkon railway station

Paywetseikkon railway station (Burmese: ပုရွက်ဆိတ်ကုန်းဘူတာ; lit. "Ant Hill") is a railway station on the Yangon Circular Railway in Yangon, Burma. It is located in North Okkalapa Township.
