= Danyingon railway station =

Railway station in Yangon, Myanmar

Coordinates: 16°55′58.4″N 96°05′37.9″E

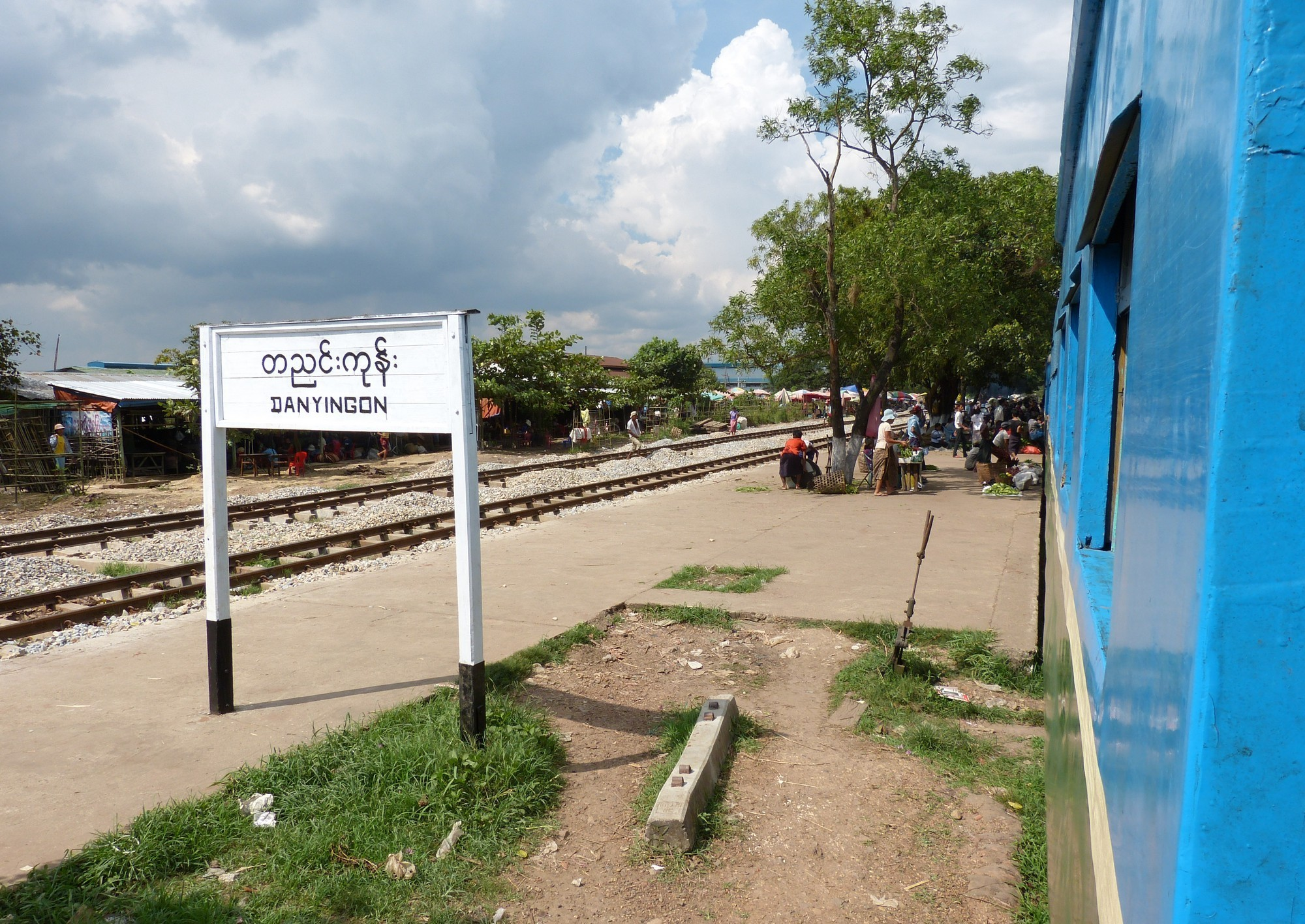
Danyingon railway station

Danyingon railway station (Burmese: တညင်းကုန်းဘူတာ; lit. "Dogfruit Hill") is a railway station on the Yangon Circular Railway in Yangon, Burma. The station has one island platform and one side platform. Track 1 and 2 serve Yangon Circular Railway and tracks 3 and 4 serve the Hlawga railway station branch line and Pyay and Bagan line.
