= Mingaladon railway station =

Railway station in Yangon, Myanmar

Coordinates: 16°55′51″N 96°08′42″E

Mingaladon railway station is a railway station on the Yangon Circular Railway in Yangon, Burma.
