= Yangon Tram =

Defunct tram line in Myanmar

Overview
- Locale: Wardan Jetty - Linsadaung, Botataung Township
- Transit type: Light rail/tram
- Number of lines: 1

Operation
- Began operation: 10 January 2016
- Ended operation: 1 July 2016
- Operator: Myanma Railways

Technical
- System length: 4.8 km (3 mi)
- Track gauge: 1,000 mm (3 ft 3 3/8 in)

Yangon Tram began service on a single tram line on 11 January 2016. Yangon previously had a tramway network which closed down during World War II. Funded by Japanese investment, the tram line service at Strand Road terminates between Wardan Jetty and Linsadaung, Botataung Township, a journey of around 4.8 kilometres (3.0 mi) using a single 50-year old tram from Hiroshima Electric Railway in Hiroshima, Japan.

The rolling stock is a 3-coach tram with a seating capacity of 200 passengers. The tram runs just 6 times each day, from 8:00 am to 4:00 pm with a fare of 100 Myanmar kyats, around US$0.08.

An extension west from Wardan Jetty to Kyeemyindaing, and an extension east from Linsadaung, Botataung Township to Pazundaung Township, would bring the length of the line to 11.3 kilometres (7.0 mi); these extensions are due to be completed later in 2016.

Yangon Tram stopped service on 1 July 2016 after only six months of running.

== Rangoon tram ==
In British Burma, Rangoon's first tramway was built in 1884. The three standard gauge routes of the Rangoon Steam Tramway Company opened on 4th March 1884. It was a steam tramway and ran from the Strand to Shwedagon. Electric trams were introduced by 15 December 1906 and the last of the routes opened on 12 March 1908. The total tramway system consisted of five routes and a total distance of 22 km with 77 cars in operation with tram depots and a generating station at Ahlone. By the 1930s trams provided efficient public transportation all around the city of Rangoon. The tramway system were destroyed during World War II by the retreating British and Japanese air raids especially during the Japanese invasion of Burma in 1942. The generation station was reconstructed to supply electricity but was eventually nationalised in 1953 and the tramway company was dissolved in 1961.

== See also ==
- Yangon BRT
