= Yangon Central railway station =

Principal railway station serving Yangon, Myanmar

Yangon Central ရန်ကုန် ဘူတာကြီး
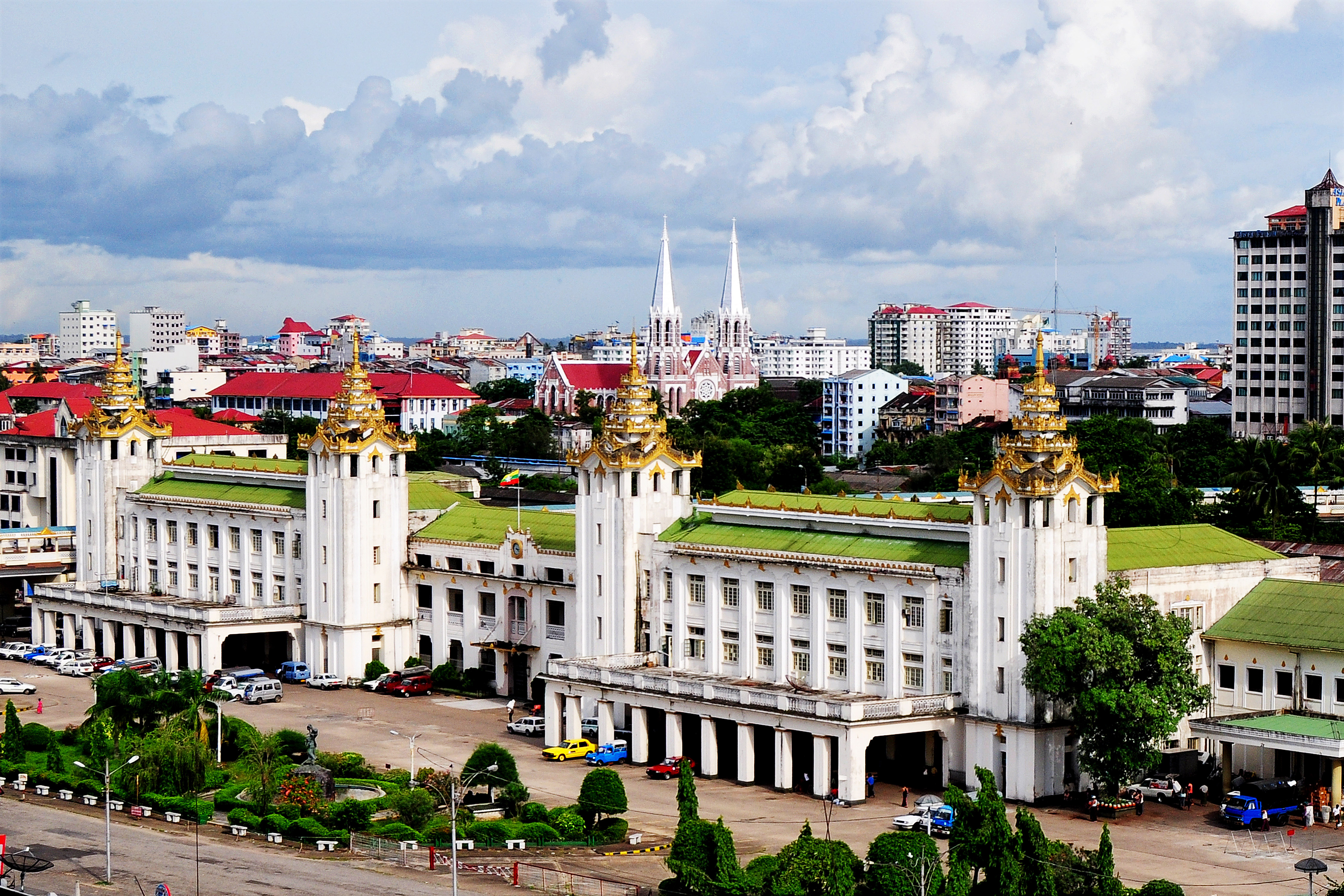
- Yangon Central railway station in July 2011

General information
- Location: Mingala Taungnyunt 11222, Yangon, Yangon Division, Myanmar; Myanmar
- Coordinates: 16°46′54″N 96°9′40″E
- Operator: Myanmar Railways
- Lines: ■ Yangon Circular Line; Yangon–Mandalay Railway; Yangon–Mawlamyine Railway
- Platforms: 7 (3 island platforms, 1 side platform)

Construction
- Structure type: At-grade

Other information
- Status: Staffed
- Website: Official website

History
- Opened: 1877
- Rebuilt: 1st rebuilding: 1911; 2nd rebuilding: 1947 – 5 June 1954

Services
| Preceding station | Myanmar Railways | Following station |
|---|---|---|
| Pagoda Road Next counter-clockwise | Yangon Circular Railway | Pazundaung Next clockwise |
Yangon Central railway station
- Interactive map of Yangon Central railway station
Site notes
- Area: 5,110 m^{2} (55,000 sq ft)
- Architect: Hla Thwin
Yangon City Landmark
- Designated: 1996
Location
- Location within Myanmar

Yangon Central railway station (Burmese: ရန်ကုန် ဘူတာကြီး [jàɰ̃ɡòʊɰ̃ bùdàdʑí]), also known as Yangon Central Station, is the central station of Myanmar. It is located in downtown Yangon, and serves as the gateway to Myanmar Railways' 3,126 mi (5,031 km) rail network whose reach covers Upper Myanmar (Naypyidaw, Mandalay, Shwebo), upcountry (Myitkyina), Shan Hills (Taunggyi, Kalaw), and the Taninthayi coast (Mawlamyine, Ye). With an area of 5110 m^{2} (55,000 sq ft), it is the largest railway station in the country.

The station was built in 1877 by the British and was later demolished and rebuilt in 1911. The station was destroyed by the retreating British in 1943 to prevent it from falling to the advancing Japanese forces during World War II. The current station building, completed on 5 June 1954, was designed by U Tin in traditional Burmese architectural style, making prominent use of indigenous tiered roofs called pyatthat.

It has been designated a landmark building.

== History ==
=== 1877–1954 ===
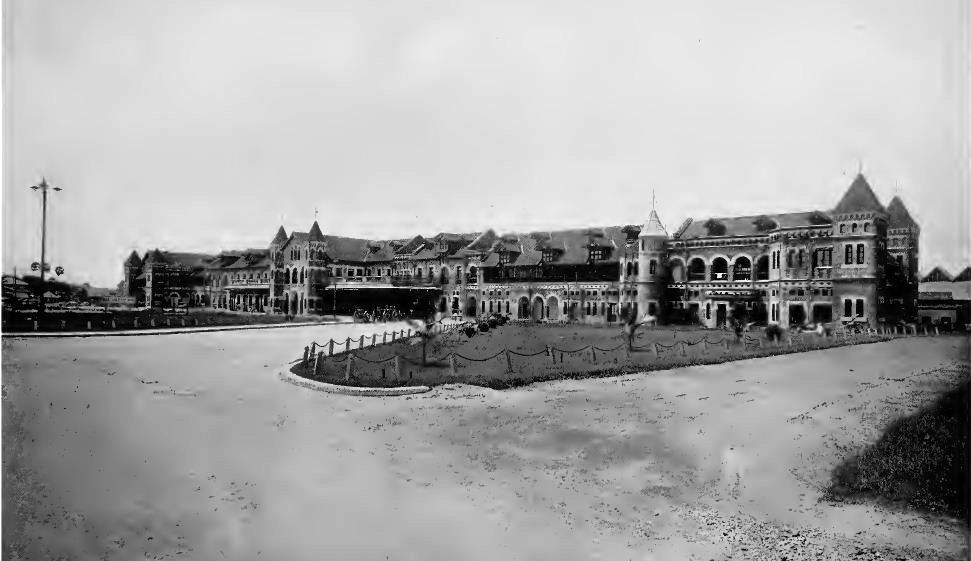
Old Rangoon Central railway station in the 1890s

Yangon Central railway station was first built in 1877 by the British to support Burma's first railway line, from Yangon to Pyay. The station was located on the southern side of the railway compound on the upper block of Phayre Street (now Pansodan Street) in the downtown area. The building was designed in the British Victorian style and the access roads were bordered by grassy lawns. The beauty of the property prompted locals to praise the new structure as the Fairy Station. The station became a prominent target for Japanese bombers during World War II. In 1943, it was destroyed by British forces retreating to India.

The station was rebuilt following the war according to a design based on Burmese traditional architectural styles, drawn by engineer Hla Thwin. The new structure was 5,110 square metres (55,000 sq ft) in size. To the north were grass lawns, gardens and wide access lanes. The new design was approved by the Railway Authority on 7 May 1946. Construction was started in January 1947 by engineer Sithu U Tin and completed in May 1954 at a total cost of K4.75 million. The opening ceremony of the new Yangon Central railway station was held on 5 June 1954.

=== 1954–present ===
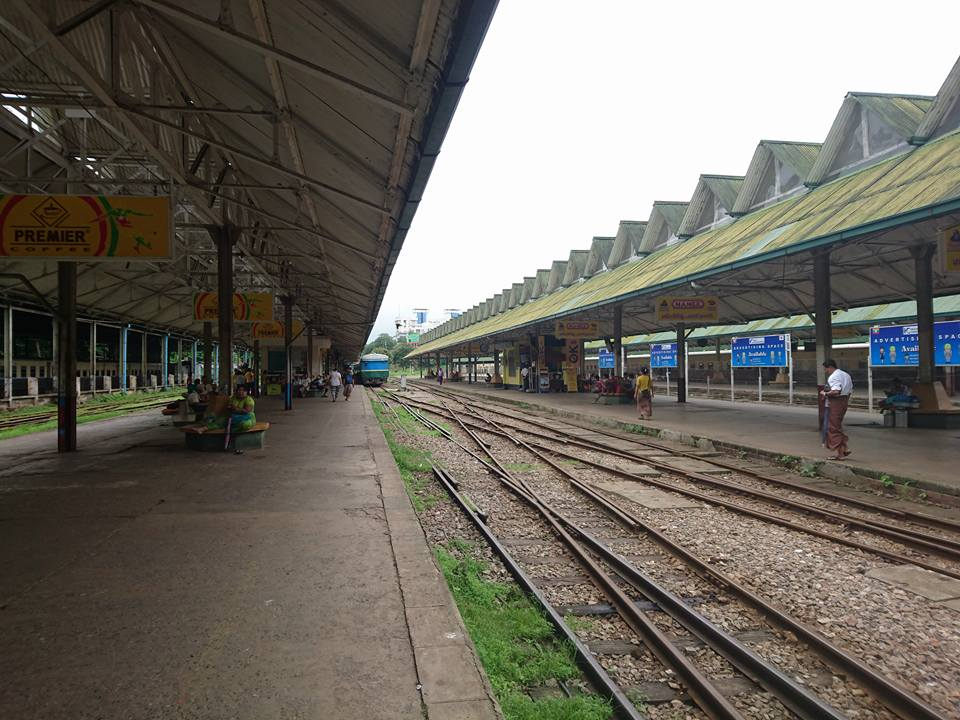
Yangon Central railway station terminal

In December 2007, the Yangon city government announced a master plan that would have resulted in Yangon Central being relocated to a satellite town, East Dagon, 32 kilometres (20 mi) from downtown Yangon at an unspecified date; this did not come to fruition.

In 2016, Al Jazeera featured the station's significant homeless population who have made the railway terminal their permanent residence.

== Railway lines ==
The following lines pass through or terminate at Yangon Central:

- Yangon Circular Railway
- Yangon–Mandalay Railway
- Yangon–Mawlamyine Railway
- Yangon–Bagan Railway
- Yangon–Aunglan–Bagan Railway
- Yangon–Pyay Railway
