= Yangon BRT =

Yangon Bus Rapid Transit

Overview
- Owner: Yangon Bus Public Company Limited
- Locale: Yangon
- Transit type: Bus rapid transit
- Number of lines: 2
- Number of stations: 22
- Daily ridership: 9,000
- Key people: Dr Maung Aung (Chairman)
- Website: Yangon Bus Public Company Limited

Operation
- Began operation: 9 February 2016
- Number of vehicles: 65

Yangon BRT is a bus rapid transit in Yangon, Myanmar, run by joint public-private venture Yangon Bus Public Company Limited (ရန်ကုန်ဘတ်စကား အများနှင့်သက်ဆိုင်သော ကုမ္ပဏီလီမိတက်). It was launched on 7 February 2016, with two circular routes. A prepaid card called Any Pay is available for payment as well as cash. The BRT Lite charges a flat rate of 300 kyats per ride (around US$0.24). The current hours of operation is from 6 a.m. to 7:30 p.m.

== Fleet ==
The YPBC operates a fleet of 65 buses serving in the Downtown Yangon (Myanmar) Area:

- 15 King Long XM6119G
- 15 Higer city-buses
- 15 Daewoo city-buses
- 15 Hyundai city-buses
- 5 Scania Marcopolo

As with any other buses serving in the city, the company name and logo is at the top of the front-end of the bus. The route number is indicated below the company logo. Names of bus-stops served are also shown at the bottom of the windscreen.

The Yangon Bus Public Company is the only bus transit company in Myanmar that operates with an all air-conditioned fleet of buses.

== YBPC BRT Lite Line 1 ==
Bus-stop name	Bus-stop name	Transfer	Location	Remarks
Htauk Kyant Junction (Terminus)			Mingaladon Township	
Nwe Khway			Mingaladon Township	
Bo Chan			Mingaladon Township	
Wireless			Mingaladon Township	
Kha Ye Bin Junction			Mingaladon Township	
Saw Bwar Gyi Kone			Mingaladon Township	
8 Mile Junction				Buses continue southward from Htaukkyant or return northward from Na Wa Day Cinema towards Htaukkyant
Hledan			Hledan	
Myay Ni Kone			Myaynigone	
Corner of Pyay Road and Bogyoke Aung San Road				
Corner of Bogyoke Aung San Road and Sule Pagoda Road				
Bahan 3rd Street				
Shwe Gone Daing				
Kokkine				
Chaw Twin Kone				
Na Wa Day Cinema				Loops back to 8 Mile Junction bus-stop; heading towards Htaukkyant

== See also ==
- Yangon Tram
