= Kyaukhtu =

Kyaukhtu ကျောက်ထု
- Town
- Location within Myanmar
- Coordinates: 21.406°N 94.136°E
- Country: Myanmar
- Region: Magway Region
- District: Gangaw District
- Township: Saw Township

Population (2014)
  - Town: 32,865
  - Urban: 4,611
  - Rural: 28,254
- Time zone: UTC+6.30 (MMT)

Kyaukhtu or Kyaukhtu is a small town in Saw Township, Magway Region, Myanmar near the Chin Hills. Kyauktu (Kyaukhtu) is the second largest town in Saw Township. Kyaukhtu area is known as part of Southern Yaw by local people. It is like a gateway connecting Mindat Township, Chin state with Pakokku, Central Myanmar by mean of Pakokku-Pauk-Tabyin-Kyaukhtu-Mindat road.

An airport built by Directorate of Military Engineers of the Ministry of Defence is located in southwest of Kyaukhtu. Kyauktu is the second largest town in Saw Township.
