= Yangon Circular Railway =

Commuter rail network in Yangon, Myanmar

Yangon Circular Railway ရန်ကုန် မြို့ပတ် ရထား
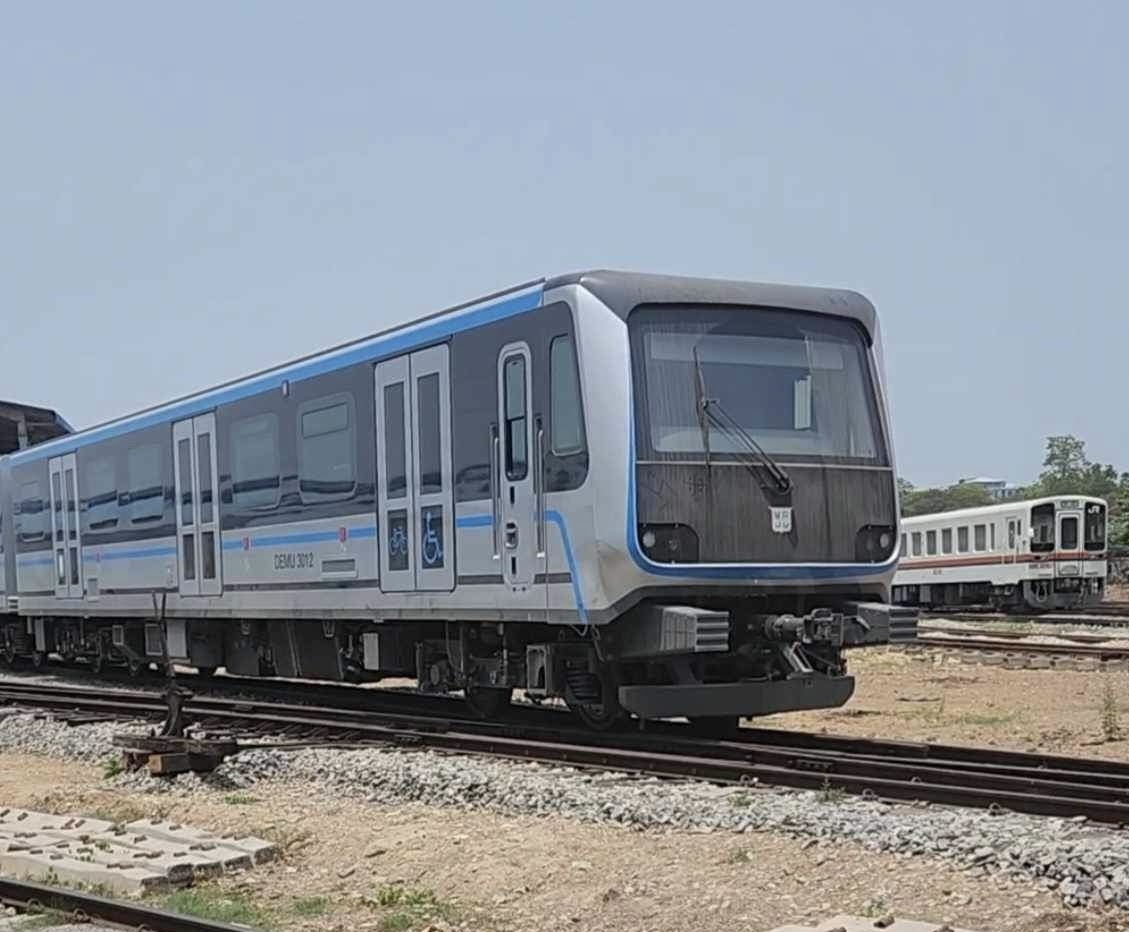

Overview
- Owner: Myanma Railways
- Locale: Yangon
- Transit type: Commuter rail
- Number of stations: 39
- Daily ridership: 7000
- Annual ridership: 2.55 million (2023)
- Headquarters: Yangon

Operation
- Began operation: 1954
- Operator: Myanma Railways
- Number of vehicles: 21
- Headway: Every 30 minutes

Technical
- System length: 45.9 km (28.5 mi)
- No. of tracks: 2
- Track gauge: 1,000 mm (3 ft 3 3/8 in)
- Average speed: 20.3 km/h (12.6 mph)

Yangon Circular Railway (Burmese: ရန်ကုန် မြို့ပတ် ရထား [jàɰ̃ɡòʊɰ̃ mjo̰baʔ jətʰá]) is the local commuter rail network that serves the Yangon metropolitan area. Operated by Myanma Railways, the 45.9-kilometre (28.5 mi) 39-station loop system connects satellite towns and suburban areas to the city. Circa 2008–2010, the railway had about 200 coaches, had 20 daily runs, and sold 100,000 to 150,000 tickets daily. The railway is heavily utilized by lower-income commuters, as it is (along with buses) the cheapest method of transportation in Yangon.

The hours of service have been consistent over the years, from 3:45 am to 10:15 pm daily. In 2011, the cost of a ticket for a distance of 15 miles was two hundred kyats (~eighteen US cents), and that for over 15 miles was four hundred kyats (~37 US cents). In the new currency (introduced in 2012) long distance tickets are 200 kyat (~20 US cents).

== History ==
Yangon Circular Railway was built in the 1930s during the British colonial rule. The line was double tracked in 1954.

In July 2011, the Ministry of Rail Transportation announced that it intended to privatize the Yangon Circular Railway, since the government-run system operates at a loss for the government, with monthly operating costs about 260 million kyats (US$325,000) and monthly revenues about 42 million kyats (US$52,500). Ticket prices have been kept low because of ministry subsidies.

In December 2012, Japan International Cooperation Agency began its collaboration with Yangon City Development Committee to develop a master plan for the Greater Yangon region, including the issue of public transport. In 2015 air conditioned coaches were introduced with a slightly higher ticket cost, but these did not last long, and by mid 2016 air conditioning was no longer available.

Myanma Railways has had plans for a major upgrade for the Circle Line since 2012. It is to be funded in large part by a $212 million loan from Japan's development agency. The hope is for all of the coaches and engines to be replaced by 2020, along with automation of the signaling systems and replacement of the aging tracks. The frequency of trains would be increased from the current two per hour. In December, 2020, a contract was awarded to a consortium of Japan's Mitsubishi and Spain's CAF to provide 11 six-car diesel powered trains with the aim of reducing the travel time of the full loop from 170 to 110 minutes.

In February 2024, the first CAF built train was delivered to Myanmar, and subsequently begun testing.

== Route and stations ==
The loop network consists of 39 stations, linking various parts of Yangon. The entire circular trip takes approximately 3 hours. Map from train is shown to the right, with approximate location of stations.

The loop begins from Yangon Central Railway Station to Mingaladon Railway Station near Yangon International Airport, via Insein to the west and Okkalapa in the east.

The major stations are as follows:

- Yangon Central
- Danyingon
- Insein
- Mingaladon
- Paywetseikkon

== Rolling stock ==
- KiHa 40 series
- KiHa 11
- KiHa 38 (RBE 25101 - RBE 25105)
- CAF DEMU

== Gallery ==
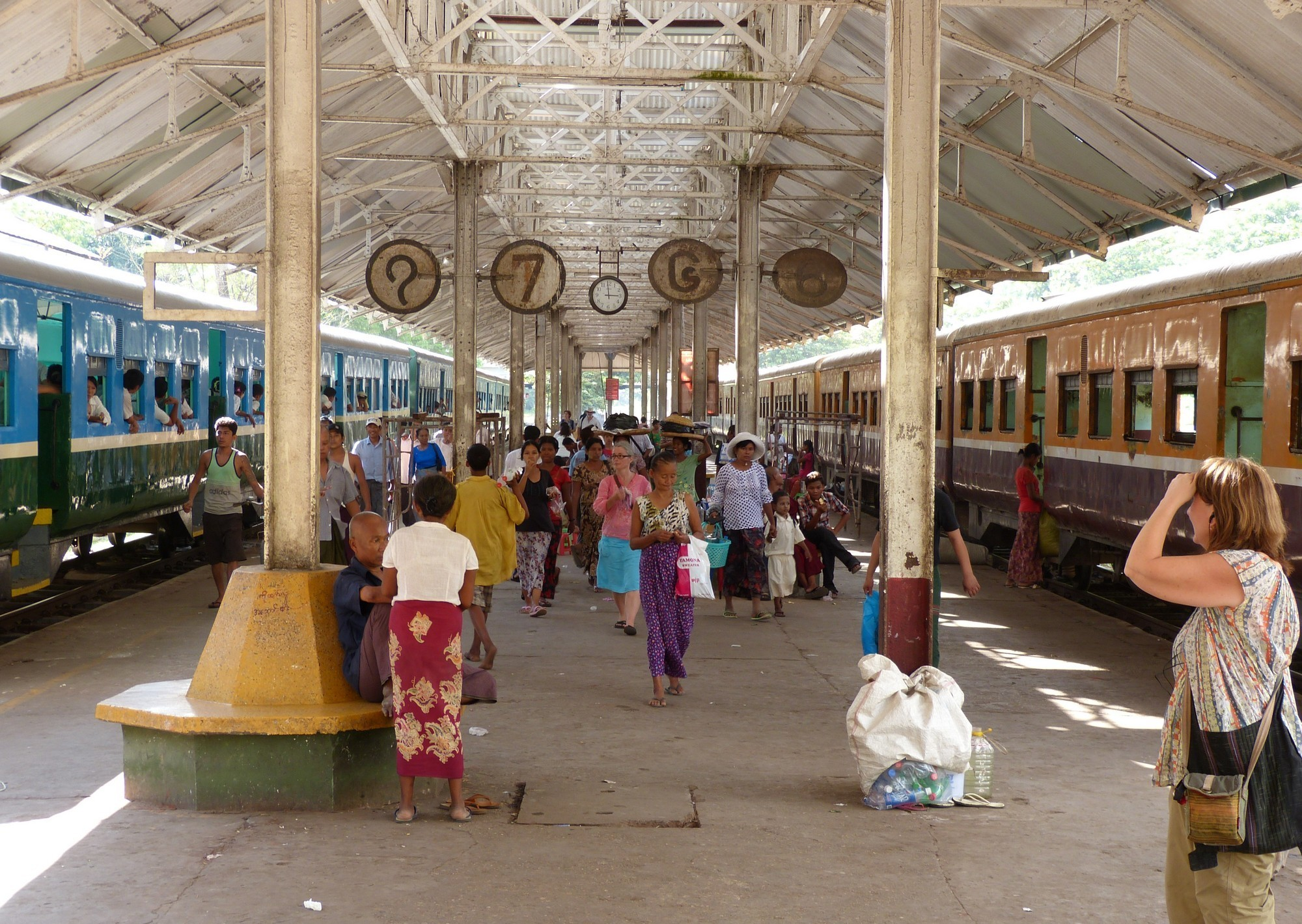
Yangon Central railway station

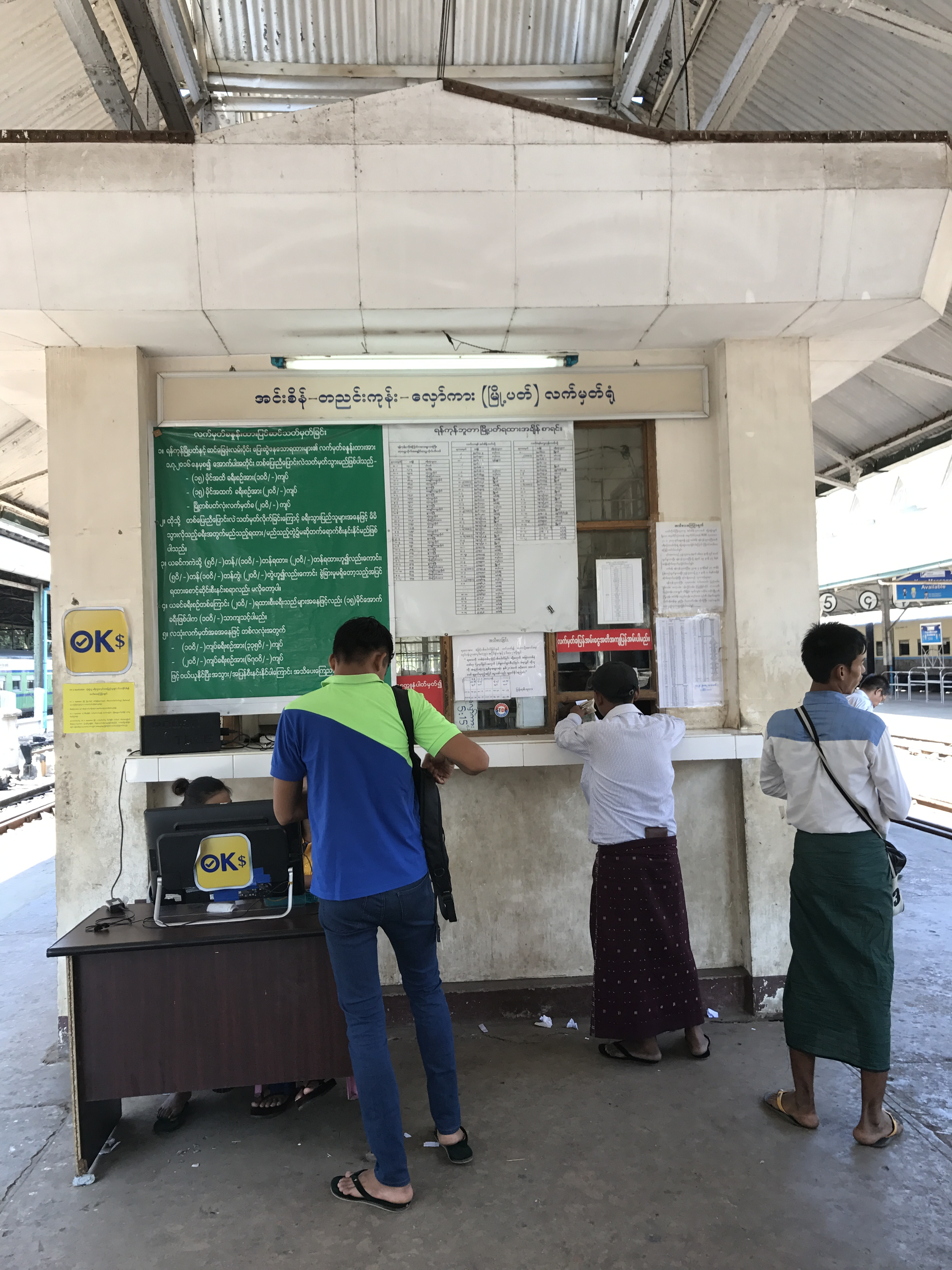
Yangon Central ticket booth for Circular Railway tickets

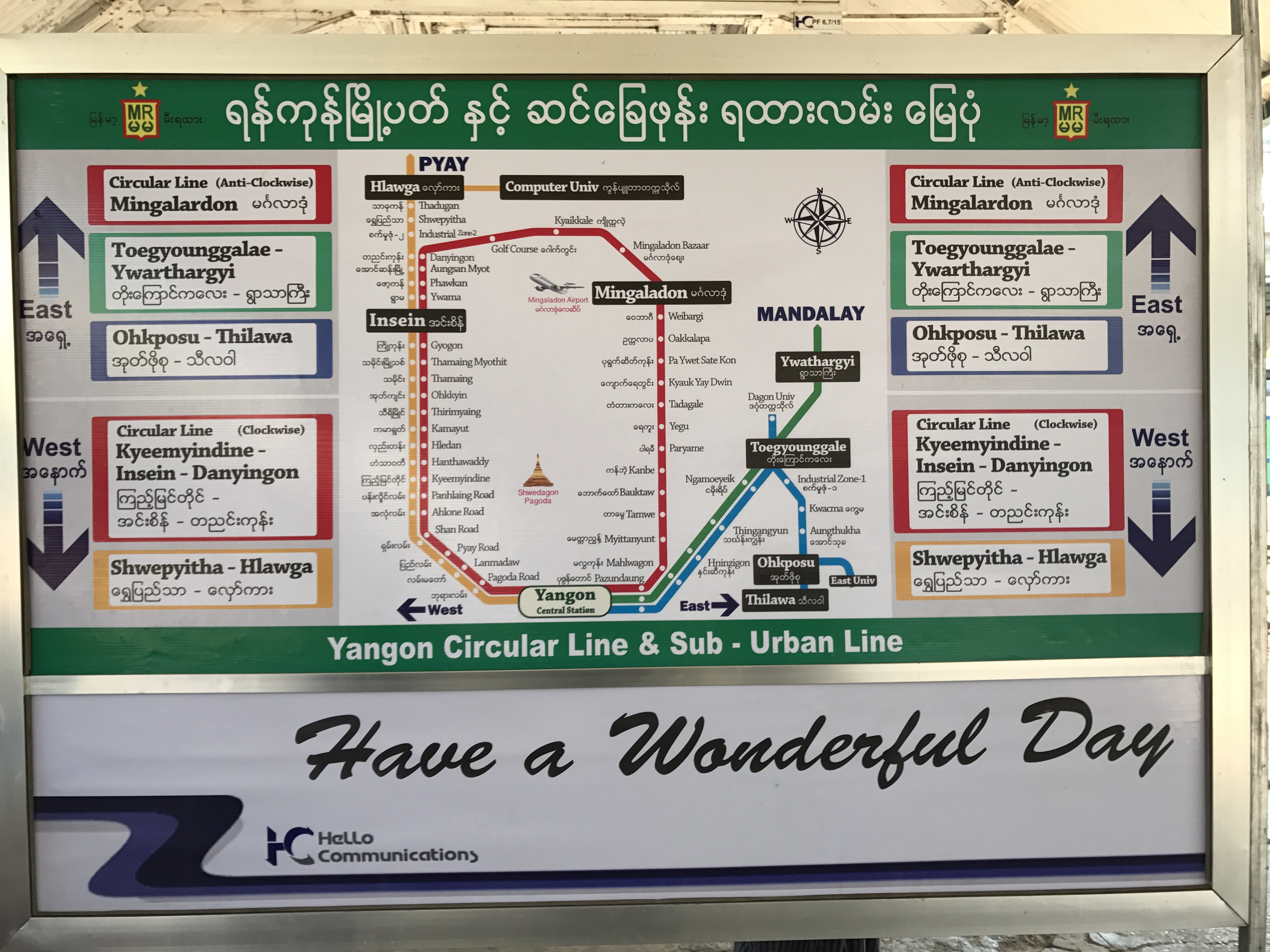
Map on platform, March 2017

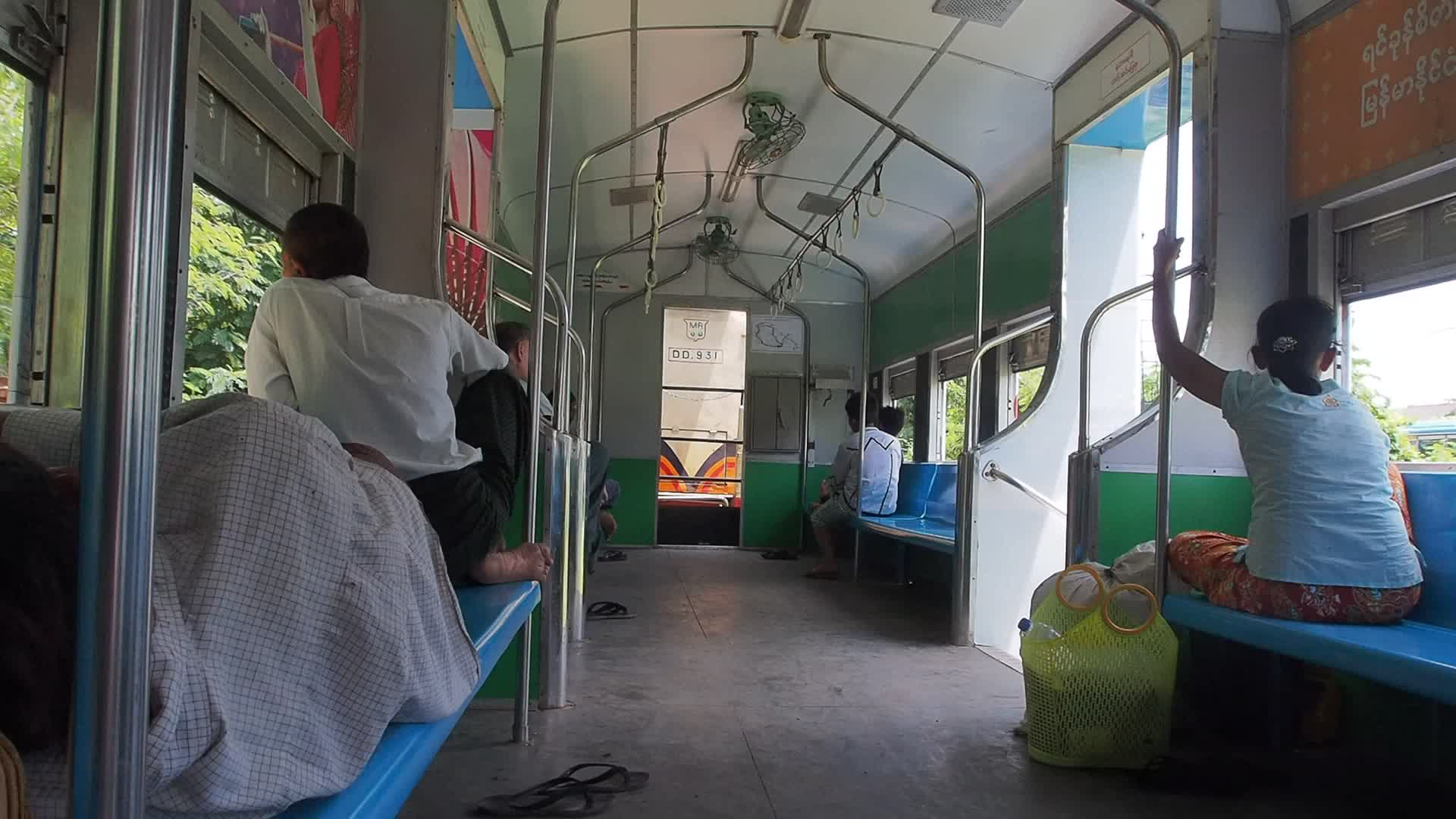
Inside a Yangon circular train

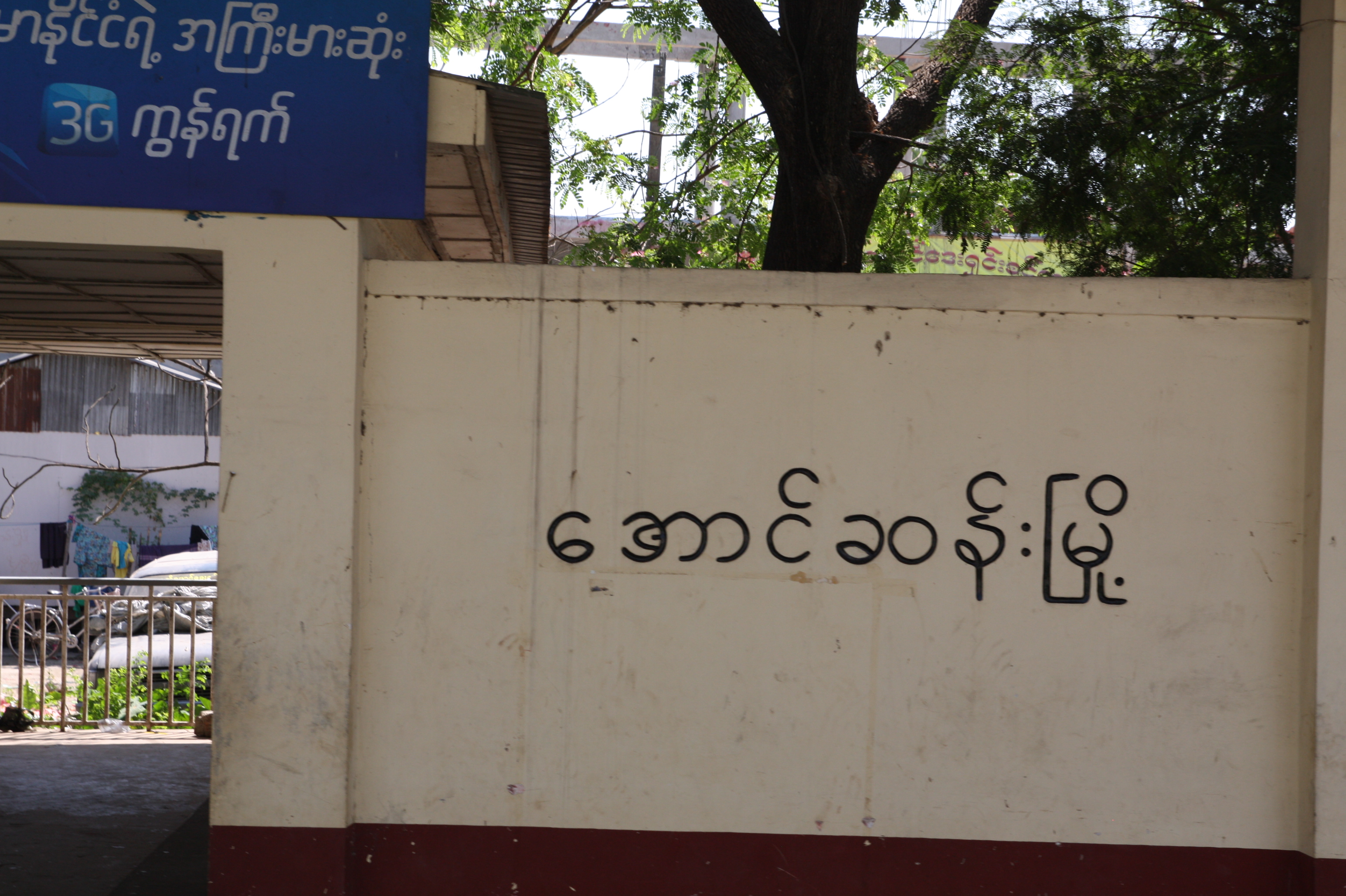
The Aungsan Myo station

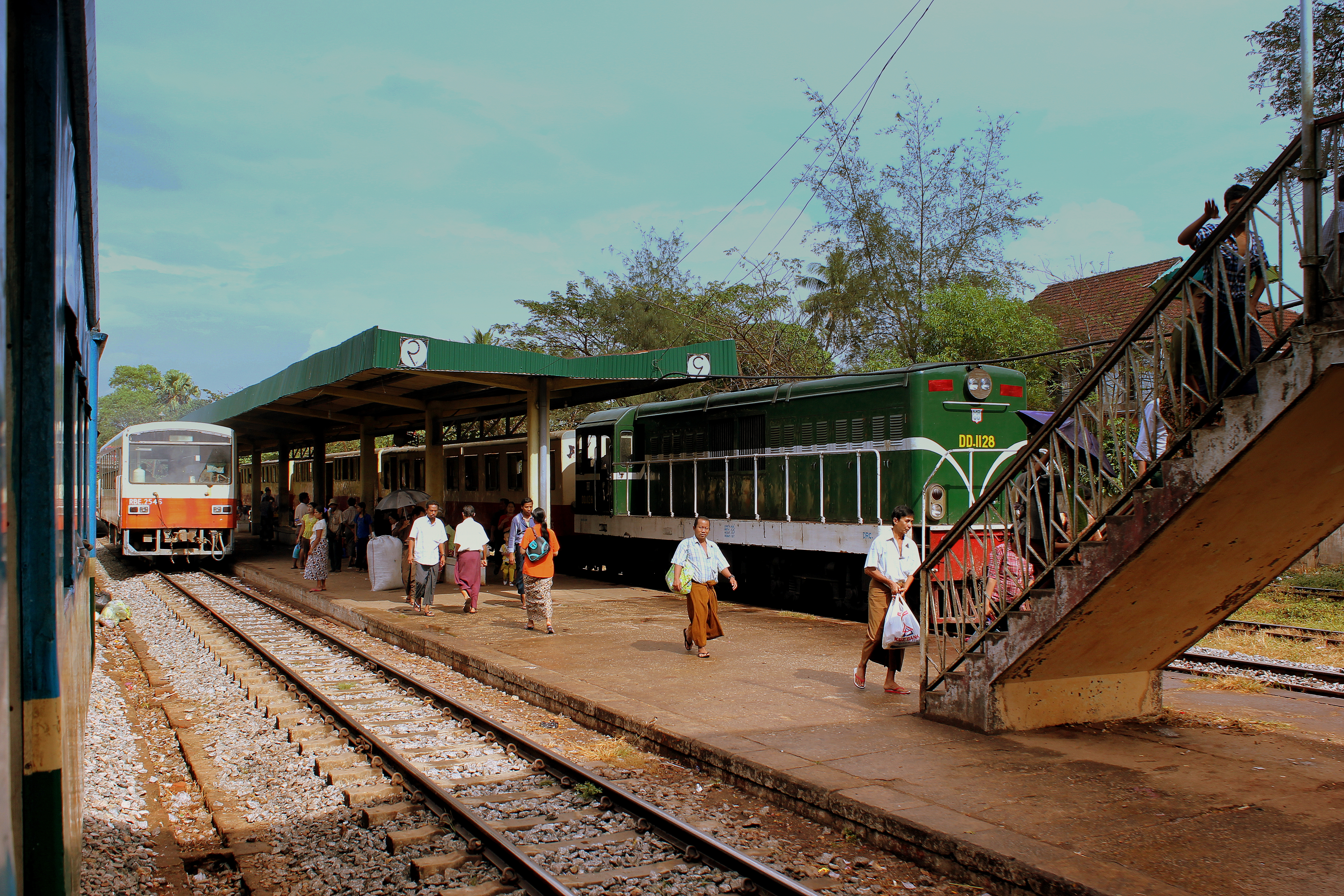
Train, Jan 2013

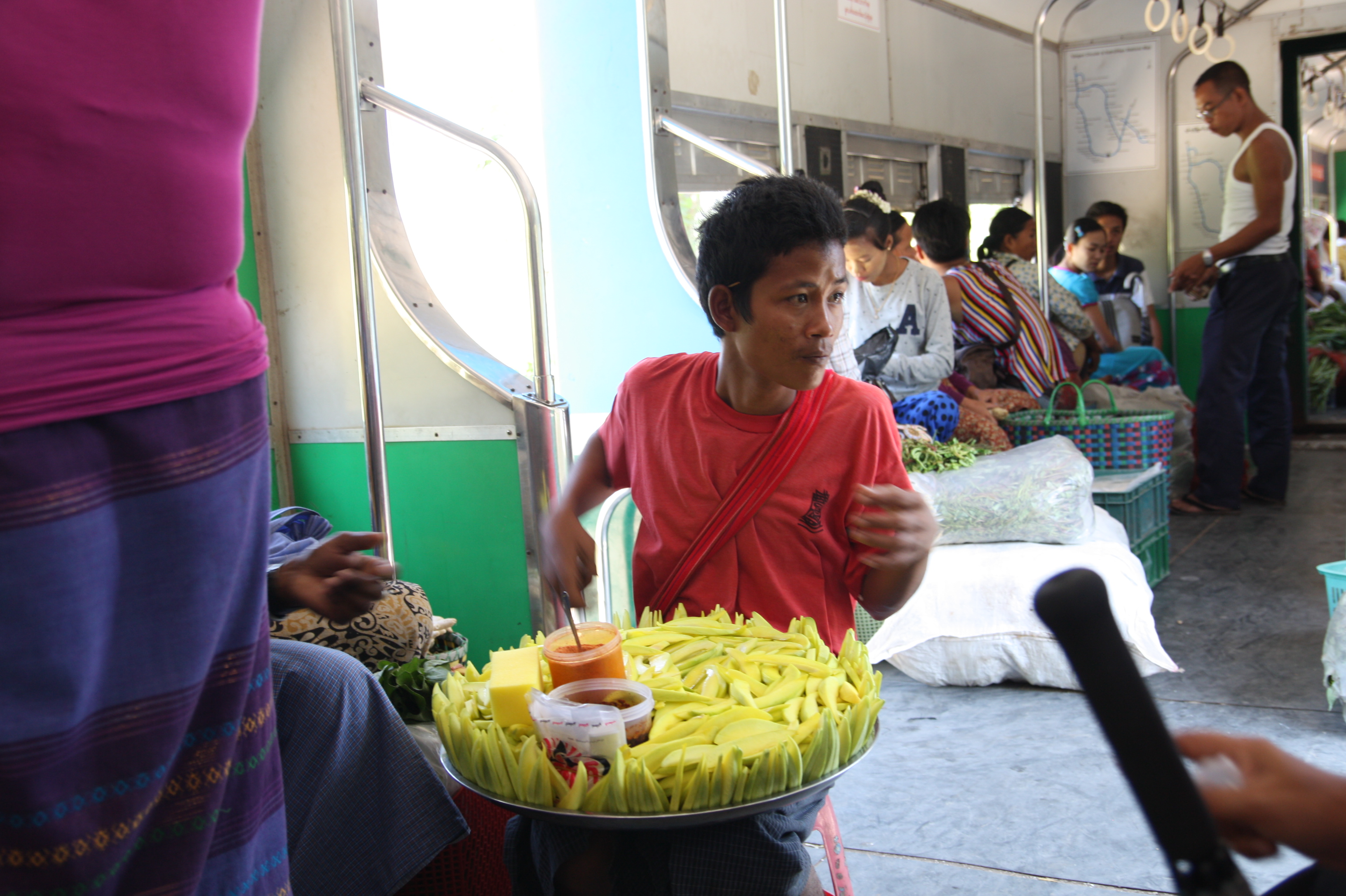
Circular Railway hawker

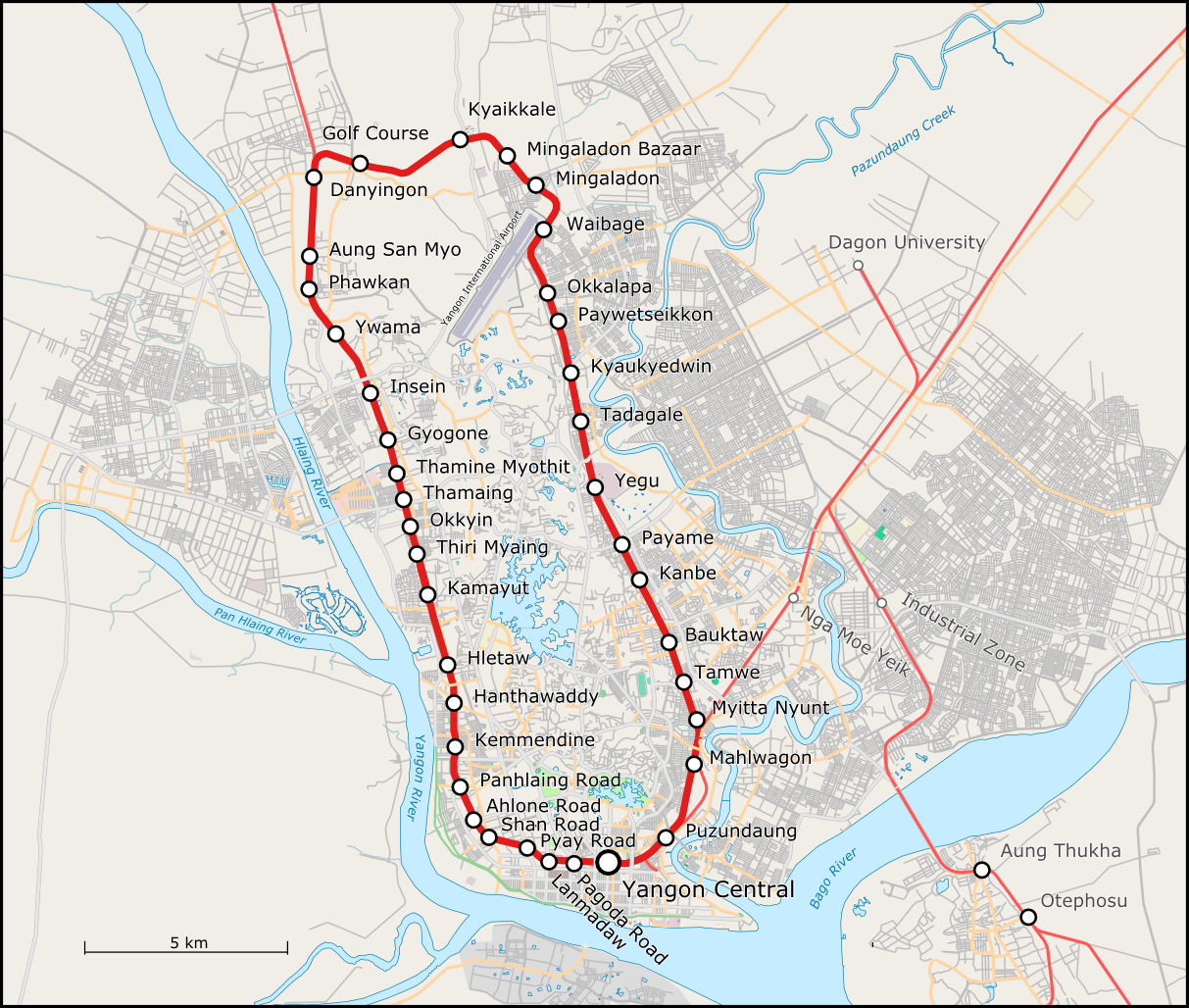
Map

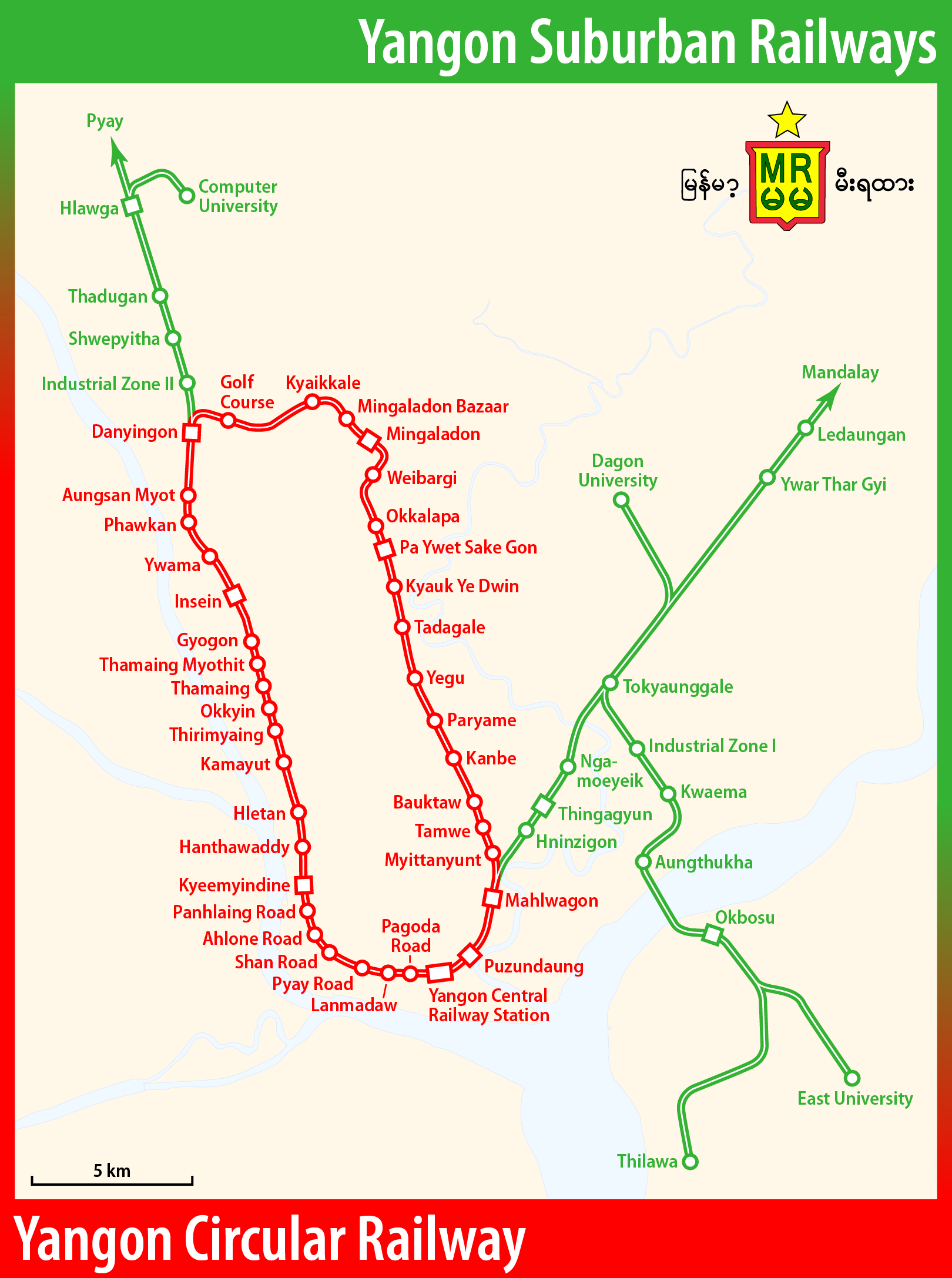
Map with suburban services

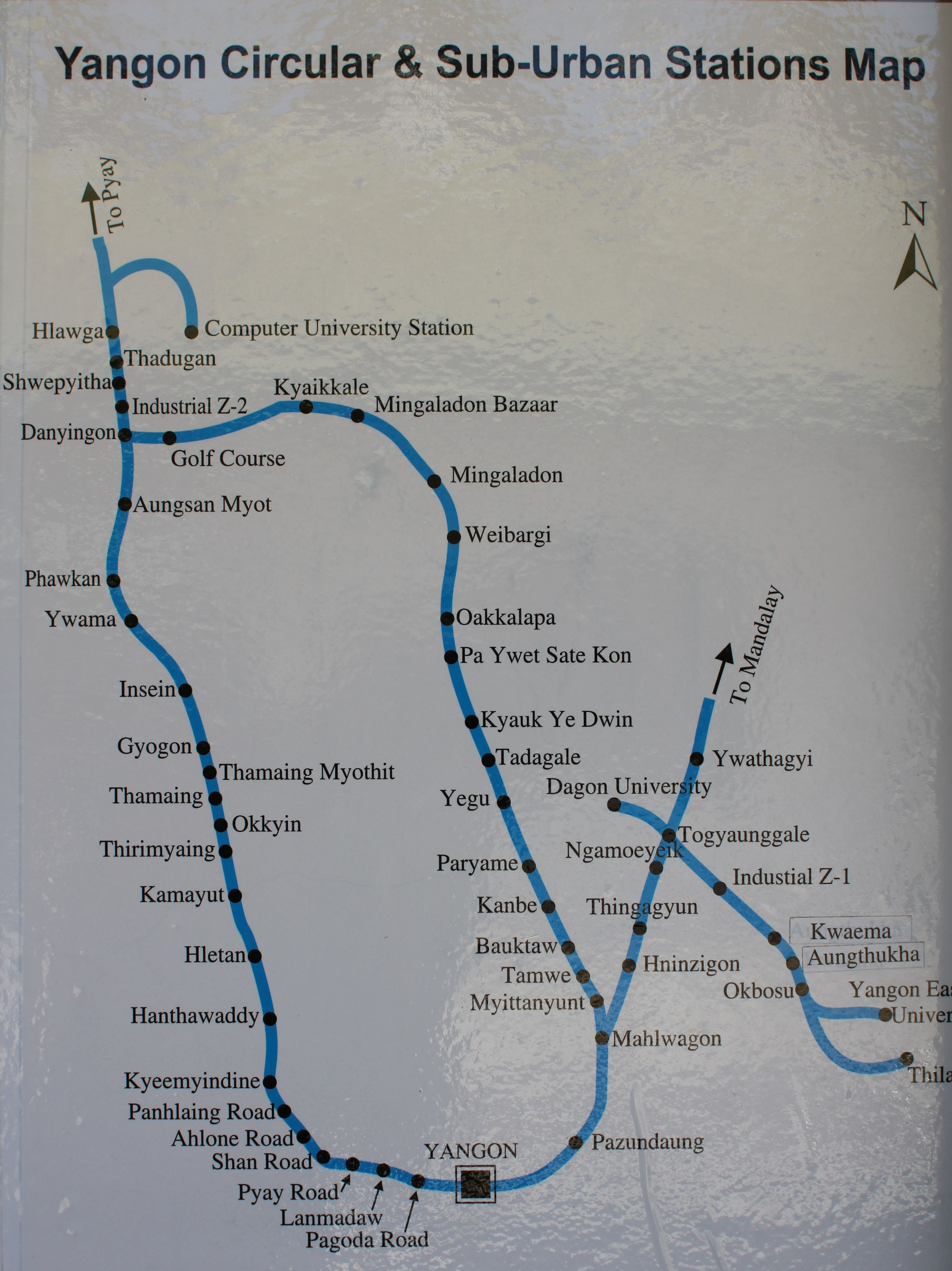
Map in train

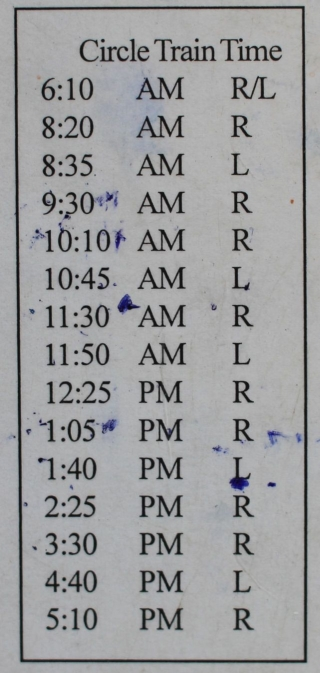
Circle Train Times, 2014

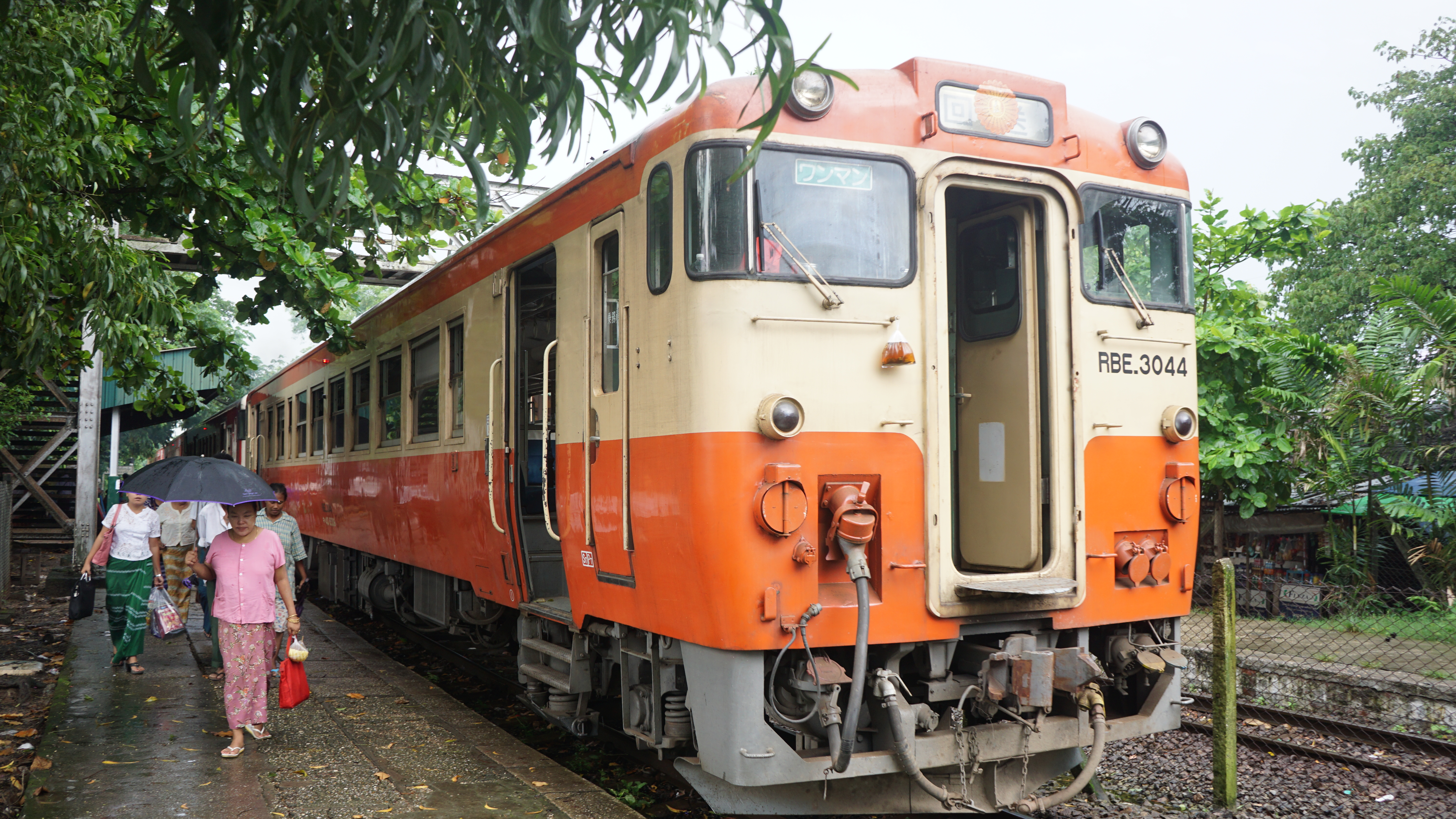
Train on Yangon Circle

A multi-directional ceiling fan in Yangon circle train.
