= Rail transport in Myanmar =

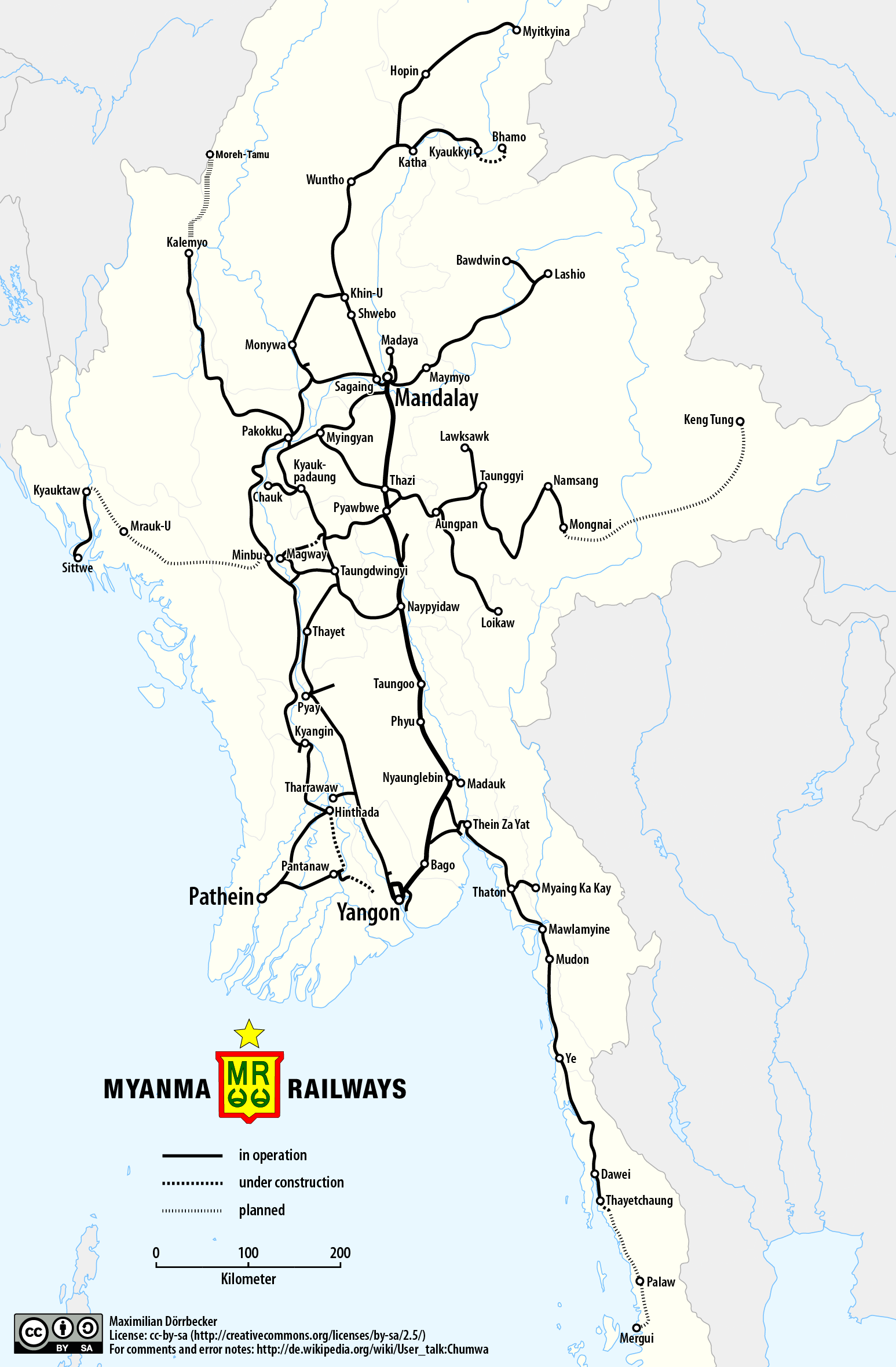
Railway map of Myanmar

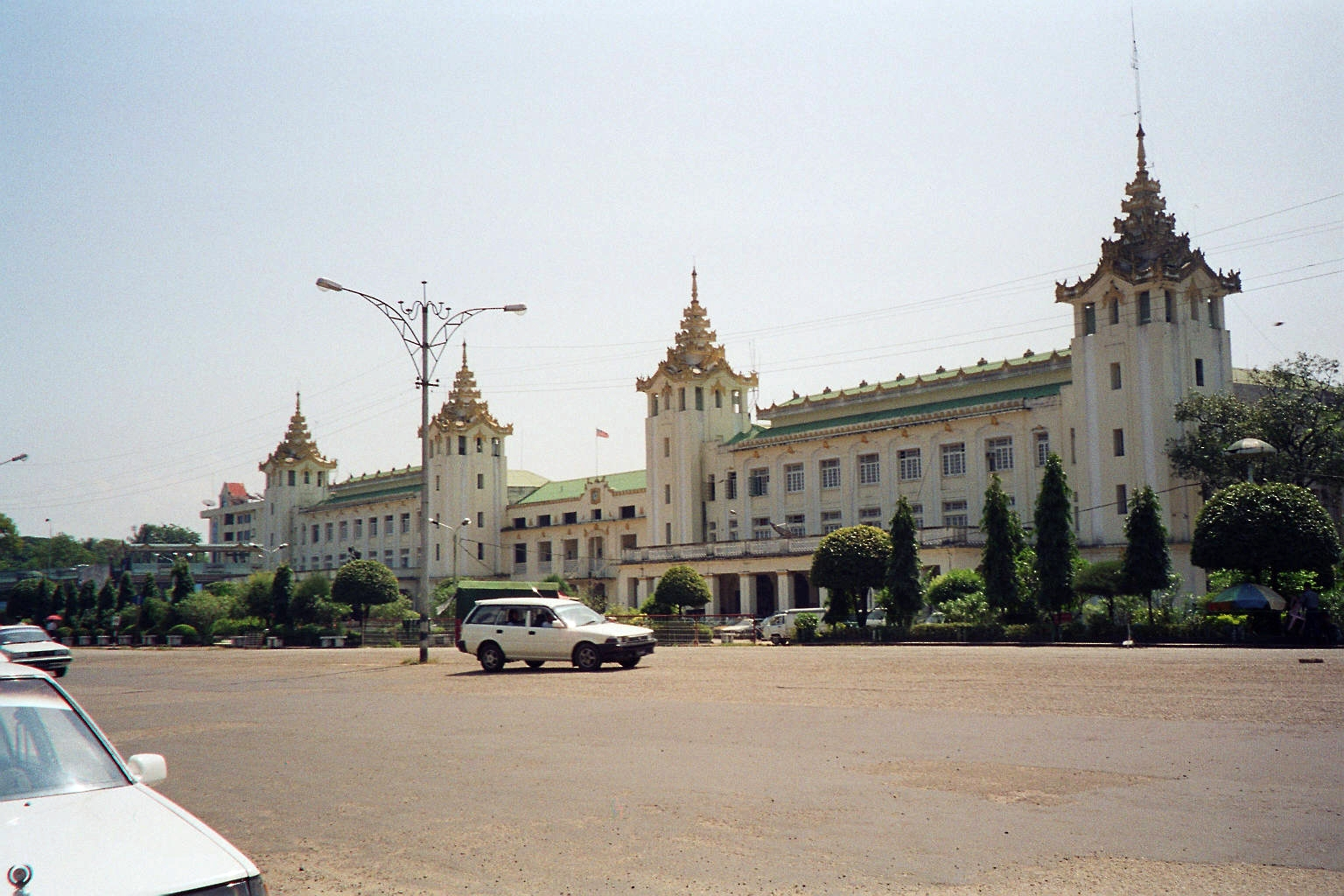
Yangon Central Railway Station in Yangon

Rail transport in Myanmar consists of a 6,207.644 km (3,857 mi) railway network with 960 stations. The network, generally spanning north to south with branch lines to the east and west, is the second largest in Southeast Asia, and includes the Yangon Circular Railway which serves as a commuter railway for Yangon, the principal commercial city in Myanmar. The quality of the railway infrastructure is generally poor. The tracks are in poor condition, and are not passable during the monsoon season. The speed of freight trains is heavily restricted on all existing links as a consequence of poor track and bridge conditions. The maximum speed for freight trains has been quoted as 24 km/h (15 mph), suggesting that commercial speeds on this section could be as low as 12–14 km/h (7.5–8.7 mph).

Logo of Myanma Railway

The network is run by Myanma Railways (Burmese: မြန်မာ့ မီးရထား, pronounced [mjəma̰ míjətʰá]; formerly Burma Railways), a state-owned railway company under the Ministry of Rail Transportation. In the 2013-14 fiscal year, Myanma Railways carried about 60 million passengers (35 million in the circular railway and 25 million inter-city travelers) and 2.5 million metric tons of freight. Its rolling stock consisted of 384 locomotives, 1,600 passenger railcars, and 3,600 freight wagons.

The network has steadily increased in size, from nearly 5,500 kilometres (3,400 mi) in 1988 to 6,207.644 kilometres (3,857.251 mi) in 2015. Myanma Railways is undertaking an ambitious expansion program that will add another 6,091 km (3,785 mi) to its network, making it spread in to 12,298 km (7,642 mi) including extensions to Myeik in the south, Kyaingtong in the east, Sittwe in the west.

== History ==
Rail transport was first launched in British Burma on 2 May 1877 with the opening of the 259-kilometre (161 mi) Rangoon (Yangon) to Prome (Pyay) line by The Irrawaddy Valley State Railway. Unusually for a British colonial railway, it was built to 1,000 mm (3 ft 3 3/8 in) metre gauge. Subsequent development was to the same gauge, though the 80 kilometres (50 mi) Burma Mines Railway opened in 1906 operated on a separate 2 ft (610 mm) gauge. In 1884, a new company, The Sittang Valley State Railway, opened a 267-kilometre (166 mi) line along the Sittaung River from Yangon to the town of Toungoo (Taungoo) via Pegu (Bago). After the annexation of Upper Burma following the Third Anglo-Burmese War of 1885, the Toungoo line was extended to Mandalay in 1889. Following the opening of this section, the Mu Valley State Railway was formed and construction began on a railway line from Sagaing to Myitkyina which connected Mandalay to Shwebo in 1891, to Wuntho in 1893, to Katha in 1895, and to Myitkyina in 1898. Extensions into southern Myanmar began in 1907 with the construction of the Bago-Mottama line. Passengers had to take a ferry over the Thanlwin River (Salween River) to Mawlamyaing.

In 1896, before the completion of the line to Myitkyina, the three companies were combined into the Burma Railway Company as a state owned public undertaking. In 1928, the railway was renamed Burma Railways and, in 1989, with the renaming of the country, it became Myanma Railways.

The Japanese invasion during the Second World War caused considerable damage to the rail network. In 1942, the country had 3,313 km (2,059 mi) (route-km) of metre gauge track, but the Japanese removed about 480 km (298 mi) and, by the end of the war, only 1,085 km (674 mi) (route-km) was operational in four isolated sections. The Japanese were also responsible for the construction of the Thailand - Burma Railway, also known as the Death Railway, using the labour of Allied prisoners of war, many of whom died in the attempt. The "Death Railway" link with Thailand fell into disuse after the war and the section of this line in Burma was permanently closed.

Attempts at rebuilding the network began in the 1950s following Burmese independence. By 1961 the network extended to 3,020 km (1,877 mi), and then remained constant until the opening of a 36 km (22 mi) line from Kyaukpadaung to Kyini in October 1970. In 1988, there were 487 operational railway stations over a 3,162 km (1,965 mi) long network. Since coming to power in 1988, the military government embarked on a railway construction program and, by 2000 the network had grown to 5,068 km (3,149 mi) (track-km) divided into 11 operating divisions. Between 1994 and 1998, the 160 km (99 mi) Ye-Dawei (Tavoy) railway in peninsular Myanmar was completed. With the construction of the 250 m (270 yd) road/rail bridge across the Ye River in 2003 and the 2.4 km (1.5 mi) Thanlwin Bridge in 2008, the Southern peninsula became fully integrated into the Myanmar's railway network. Also in 2008/9, the Ayeyawady Valley route was extended north along the west bank of the river towards Pakokku in the far north of the country. The 60 km (37 mi) Kyangin-Okshippin (Padang) section of Kyangin-Thayet railway was opened in March 2008 and the 56 km (35 mi) Okshippin-Kamma railway section was opened in March 2009.

In 2016 a tram route opened in Yangon, on a former heavy rail freight route through the city streets. Rolling stock is a three car train purchased second hand from Hiroshima, Japan; it is the first 1,435 mm (4 ft 8 1/2 in) standard gauge, and a third rail was added to the line to accommodate it.

== Lines ==
There are 960 active railway stations in Myanmar with Yangon Central and Mandalay Central as the twin anchors of the network. Recently, rail service has been extended along the Taninthayi coast to Mon State and Tanintharyi Region with Mawlamyine station as the southern hub. The railway lines generally run north to south with branches to the east and the west. The 140 km/h Dali–Ruili railway from China reaches the border at Ruili but does not connect to the Myanmar network.

Most of the routes are single track although large parts of Yangon-Pyay and Yangon-Mandalay routes are double track.

Myanmar's railway network is divided into three broad groups of lines, the lines in Upper Myanmar, those in Lower Myanmar, and the Yangon Circular Railway that serves as Yangon's commuter rail.

=== Rail lines in Lower Myanmar ===
Line	Route	Length	Notes
Yangon–Mandalay	Yangon-Bago-Toungoo-Naypyidaw-Thazi-Mandalay	620 kilometres (390 mi)	Express trains skip Bago
Yangon–Mawlamyine	Yangon-Bago-Theinzayat-Kyaikhto-Thaton-Mottama-Mawlamyine	296 kilometres (184 mi)	
Yangon-Myingyan	Yangon-Pyinmana-Taungdwingyi-Kyaukpadaung-Bagan-Myingyan	691 kilometres (429 mi)	
Yangon-Pakokku	Yangon-Pyinmana-Taungdwingyi-Kyaukpadaung-Bagan-Pakokku	652 kilometres (405 mi)	
Yangon-Aunglan-Bagan	Yangon-Letbadan-Paungde-Aunglan-Kyaukpadaung-Bagan	676 kilometres (420 mi)	
Yangon–Pyay	Yangon-Pyay	259 kilometres (161 mi)	The first railway line to be constructed in Burma.
Tanintharyi Line	Mawlamyine-Ye-Dawei	339 kilometres (211 mi)	An extension to Myeik was under construction.The project was halted in 2014

=== Rail lines in Upper Myanmar ===
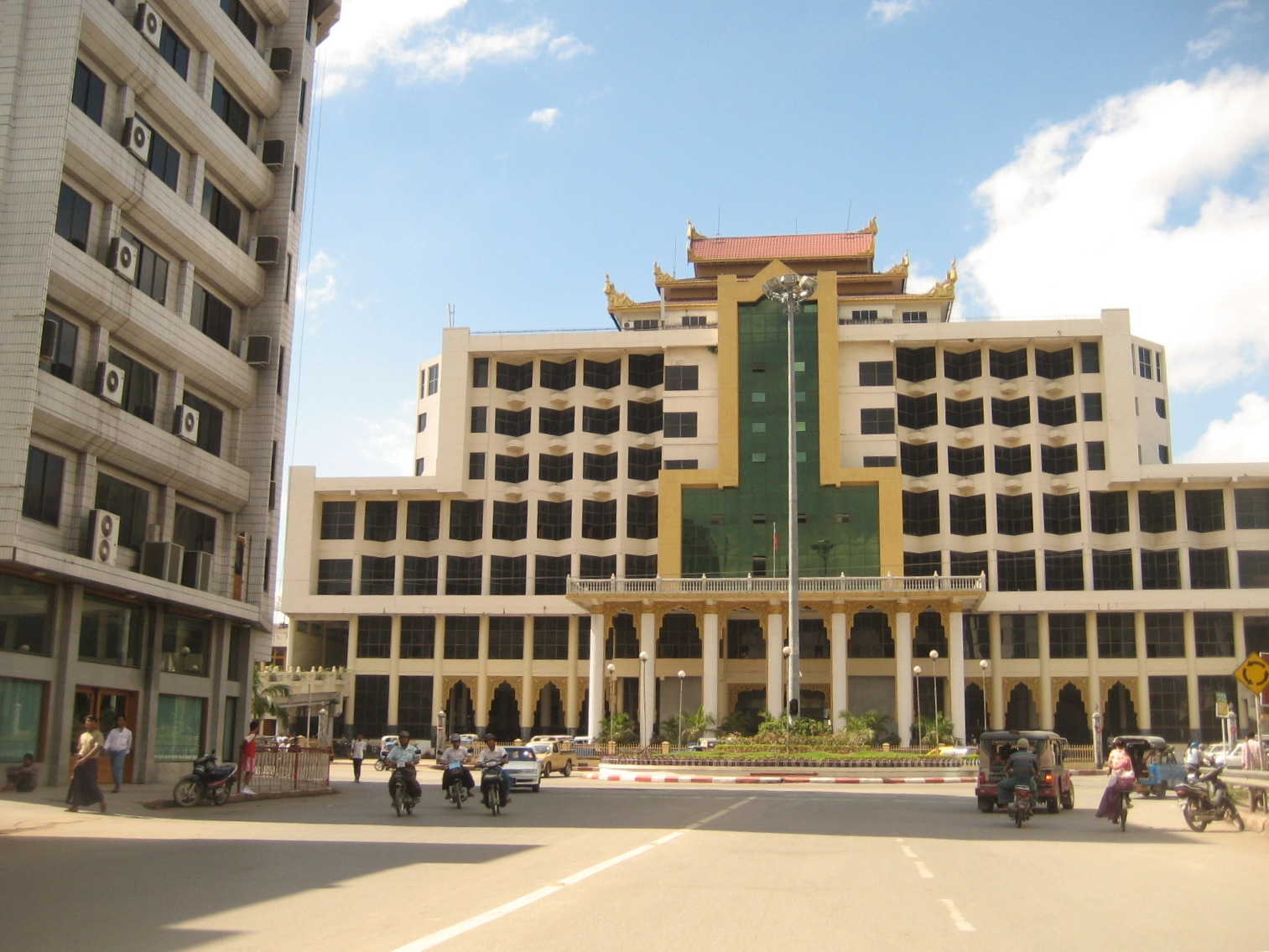
Mandalay Central

Line	Route	Length
Mandalay–Myitkyina	Mandalay-Sagaing-Shwebo-Myitkyina	361 kilometres (224 mi)
Mandalay–Lashio	Mandalay-Pyinoolwin-Kyaukme-Hsipaw-Lashio	441 kilometres (274 mi)
Mandalay-Thazi	Mandalay-Thedaw-Dahuttaw-Hanza-Ywapale-Thazi	500 kilometres (310 mi)
Monywa-Pakkoku	Monywa-Khinnu-Mandalay-Pakkoku	729 kilometres (453 mi)
Tada-U-Myingyan	Paleik-Tada-U-Myotha-Natogyi-Myingyan	100.69 kilometres (62.57 mi)

=== Yangon Circular Railway ===
Yangon Circular Railway is an 81-kilometre (50 mi) 39-station loop system that connects Yangon's downtown, satellite towns and suburban areas. Around 150,000 people use the approximately 300 trains that run around the loop daily.

=== Proposed rapid transit ===
The Yangon Urban Mass Rapid Transit is due to begin construction of the east–west line from Hlaing Thayar in the west to Parami in the east in 2022, to be complete by 2027. This line is to be further extended east to Togyaung Galay station on the Yangon-Bago intercity rail line.

=== Lines under construction ===
The following four lines are currently under construction:

1. Kyaukyi–Sinkhan–Bamow with a distance of 94.87 miles (152.68 km) as a part of Katha–Bamow railway project to allow the passengers and cargo to reach Bamow by rails rather by the Irrawaddy flotilla service. So far, the opened section is 37.06 miles (59.64 km) while the other 57.81 miles (93.04 km) is still under construction. The section under construction is the Kyaukkyi Bridge across Ayarwaddy Bridge at Sinkhan–Bamaw (57.81 miles (93.04 km)). Construction started 16 May 2007 expecting to finish the project in 2018–2019. The opened sections are:
  1. Katha-Moetagyi (16.68 miles (26.84 km)): construction started 16 May 2007 and opened 20 May 2010
  2. Moetagyi–Kyaukkyi (20.38 miles (32.80 km)): construction started 16 May 2007 and opened 7 February 2014
2. Natmouk- KanPyar with a distance of 94.71 miles (152.42 km) as a part of Pyawbwe-Natmouk-Magwe railway project. So far, the opened section is 65.22 miles (104.96 km) while the other 29.49 miles (47.46 km) are still under construction, being Kanbya-Natmauk. Construction started 10 November 2008, expecting to finish in 2017 - 2018. The opened sections are:
  1. Magwe-Kanbya (7.68 miles (12.36 km)): construction started 10 November 2008, opened 19 December 2009
  2. Pyawbwe(Yan Aung) - Ywadaw (22.12 miles (35.60 km)): construction started 10 November 2008, opened 16 January 2010
  3. Ywadaw-Natmauk (35.42 miles (57.00 km)): construction started 10 November 2008, opened 16 March 2013
3. Yechanbyin - Kwantaung - Kyauktaw - Ann - Minbu with a distance of 257.00 miles (413.60 km) as a part of Minbu-Ann-Sittway railway project to allow the connection to Port of Sittway. So far, the opened section is 54.00 miles (86.90 km) while the other 203.00 miles (326.70 km) is still under construction, one of them being Yechanbyin-Pardaleik (5.81 miles (9.35 km)). Construction started 15 February 2009. The other sections which are waiting for budget and contract signing is Pardaleik-Kwan Taung (4.18 miles (6.73 km)) and Kyauktaw-Ann-Minbu (193.01 miles (310.62 km)) with a hope to finish the project in 2021 - 2022. Sittwe-Kyauktaw-Zorinpui railway is part of India-Myanmar Kaladan Multi-Modal Transit Transport Project. From Minbu it will connect to 1,215 km long Kyaukpyu port-Minbu-Kunming high-speed railway being planned by China. The opened sections are:
  1. Sittwe-Yechanbyin (11.46 miles (18.44 km)): construction started 15 February 2009, opened 19 May 2009
  2. Kwan Taung- Ponnagyun-Yotayouk (22.72 miles (36.56 km)): construction started 15 February 2009 and opened 15 May 2010
  3. Yotayouk-Kyaukhtu (19.28 miles (31.03 km)): construction started 16 May 2010, opened 11 April 2011
4. Einme-Nyaundong with a distance of 96.51 miles (155.32 km) as a part of Pathein(Begayet) – Einme - Nyaundong Yangon (Hlaing Thayar) to allow the connection between Yangon with Port of Pathein. The section under construction is Einme-Nyaungdong-Hlaingthayar (75.76 miles (121.92 km)). Construction started 1 December 2009 with a hope to be done in 2017 - 2018. So far, the opened section is 61.09 miles (98.31 km) while the other 35.42 miles (57.00 km) is still under construction. The opened sections are:
  1. Pathein(Begayet)-Einme (20.75 miles (33.39 km)): construction started 1 December 2009 and opened 20 March 2011

== Rolling Stock ==
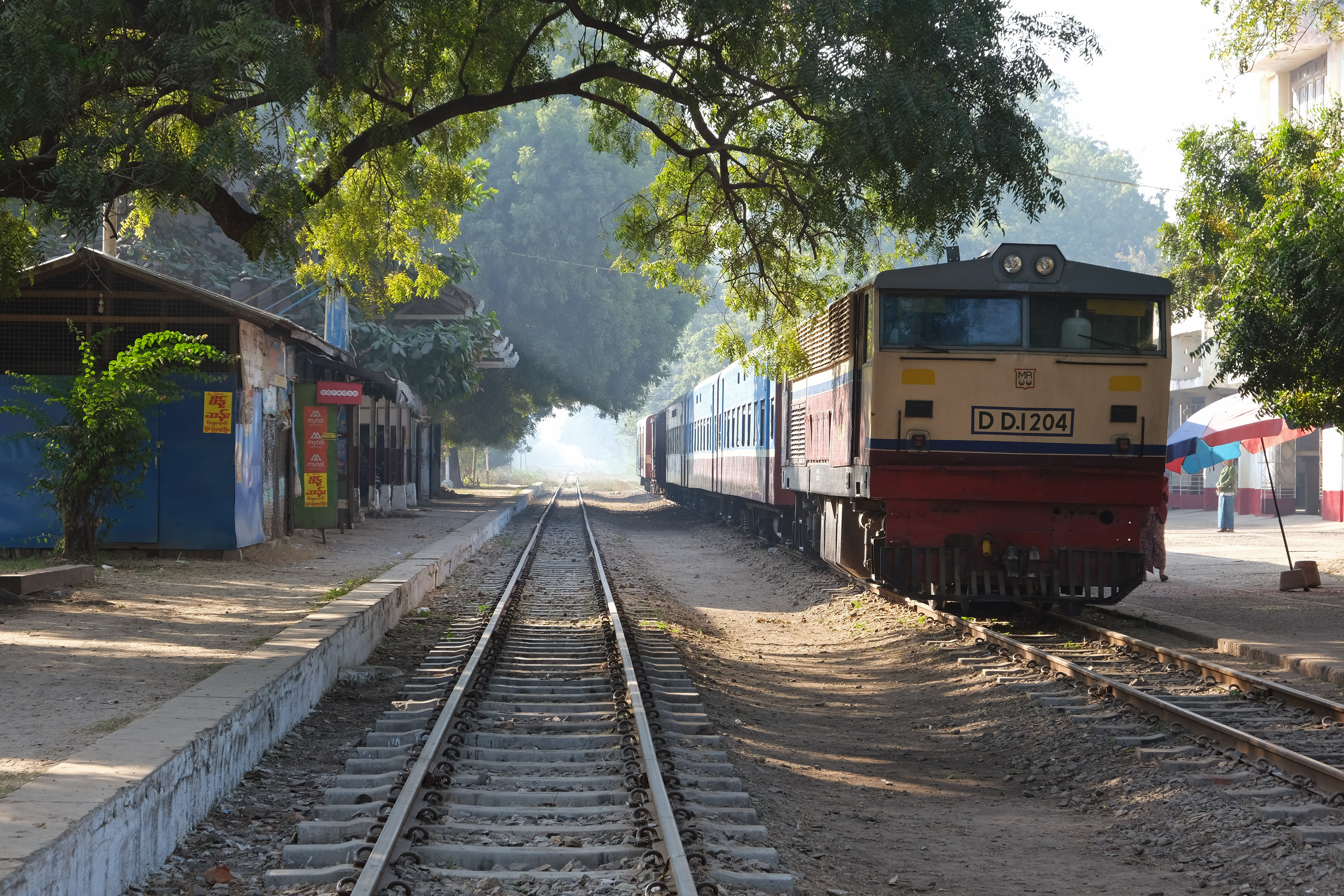
The trains are relatively slow in Myanmar. The 179 km (111 mi) railway trip from Bagan to Mandalay takes about 7.5 hours.

In 2005, the Japan Railways Group and other, privately owned, Japanese railway companies donated rolling stock to Myanma Railways, including former JNR-era DMUs, railcars and passenger coaches. China donated 130 units of meter gauge carriages in 2006 and another 225 in 2009. In early As of 2011, Myanma Railways operated 389 locomotives and 4,673 railway coaches.

=== Locomotives ===
In 1999, Myanma Railway had 201 diesel locomotives, and a further 88 were on order. Up to 1987 the main suppliers were Alstom, Krupp and various Japanese companies, but since then orders have been placed with China because of Myanmar's lack of access to hard currency. In 2004, Myanma Railway had approximately 40 oil-fired steam locomotives, of which about a dozen were serviceable and saw occasional use on goods, local passenger and tourist trains. Up to three heavy repairs are performed per year using locally manufactured parts. Between 1988 and 2009, the railway imported 96 diesel locomotives, 55 from China and 41 from India and, by December 2009, it had a total of 319 locomotives. In October 2010, the railway acquired 30 more locomotives from China.

In 2014, Myanma Railway acquired a Hokutosei train set from Japan after the withdrawal of the Hokutosei Blue Train Service in preparation of the opening of the Hokkaido Shinkansen which opened in 2016. The locomotive acquired was the former DD51 Diesel Locomotive along with the former Blue Trains that were formerly operated by JR Hokkaido.

In 2015, JR Central donated 16 single-car KiHa 11 DMUs, which were originally intended to be scrapped. These DMUs were reclassified as RBE (rail bus engine).

In March 2018, India handed over 18 diesel-electric locomotives to Myanmar under an Indian line of credit. These 18 locomotives were fitted with the microprocessor control based system. 1350 HP AC/DC main line diesel locomotives with a maximum speed of 100 km/h had been customised for the Myanmar Railways. From the Indian side, RITES Ltd., an Indian government enterprise, has been a principal partner of Myanma Railways and was involved in the supply of these 18 locomotives.

=== Coaches ===
In 1999 Myanma Railways had 868 coaches, with a further 463 on order. However many branch lines have only lightly built permanent way, and on these routes traffic is in the hands of a fleet of more than 50 light rail-buses built from lorry parts in MR's workshops. These are powered through their rubber-tired road wheels, and usually haul three small four-wheel coaches converted from goods wagons. Small turntables are used to turn the rail-buses at the termini.

=== Wagons ===
There were 5,187 freight wagons in 1999, with 1,188 due to be delivered. The majority of goods trains on lines without significant gradients run without any train brakes, as most of the serviceable wagons have been cannibalised and now lack vacuum hoses. Goods trains up to 600 tonnes are braked by the locomotive only, and operate at a maximum speed of 32 km/h (19.9 mph). If the train is particularly heavy the wagons at the front will be fitted with hoses for the duration of the trip. On the steeply-graded ghat sections all wagons will be braked.

== Railway links to adjacent countries ==
Apart from the Wartime Siam Burma Death Railway the country has never had any international links.

However there are ongoing projects to integrate Myanmar with neighbourhood as part of Look East policy of India and String of Pearls, Belt and Road Initiatives of China such as:

- China–Myanmar–Thailand railway to Dawei: In 2010 and 2011, 1,435 mm (4 ft 8 1/2 in) standard gauge international lines north to China and east to Thailand from a new port and industrial area at Dawei were proposed.
- China–Myanmar railway from Yangon - Kunming: *Dali to Ruili in China is under construction and expected to be completed in 2023. But the construction of the section in Myanmar has not been decided and is still under negotiation*. Serves new Bay of Bengal port. From Yangôn to Kunming in China.
- India–Vietnam railway via Myanmar–Thailand–Cambodia: On 9 April 2010, the Government of India announced that it is considering a Manipur to Vietnam link via Myanmar, although this would require a break-of-gauge 1,435 mm (4 ft 8 1/2 in) (Burma)/1,676 mm (5 ft 6 in) (India). India also proposed that these two proposed links be connected, allowing trains from Delhi to Kunming via Myanmar, but requiring break-of-gauge from 1,435 mm (4 ft 8 1/2 in) in Burma to 1,676 mm (5 ft 6 in) in India.
- India-Sittwe Kaladan Multi-Modal Transit Transport Project: Sittwe–Kyaukhtu(Kyauk Taw)–Zochachhuah/Hmawngbuchhuah– Sairang with a distance of 665 kilometres (413 mi) as part of India–Myanmar Kaladan Multi-Modal Transit Transport Project. 90 km Sittwe–Kyaukhtu railway in Myanmar already exists, 200 km long Kyaukhtu–Zorinpui in Myanmar is planned but not yet surveyed, 375 km long Zochawchhuah(Zorinpui)–Sairang railway in India is being surveyed since Aug-2017.

=== Summary ===
The proposed international rail links are:

- Same gauge 1,435 mm (4 ft 8 1/2 in) standard gauge
  - China (should have opened in 2021, postponed)
  - Thailand
- Break of gauge 1,435 mm (4 ft 8 1/2 in)/1,676 mm (5 ft 6 in)
  - India
  - Bangladesh

== See also ==
- List of railway stations in Myanmar
- Transport in Myanmar
- Burma Mines Railway

== Bibliography ==
- Chailley-Bert, Joseph (1894). The Colonisation of Indo-China. Translated by Arthur Baring Brabant. London: A. Constable & Company.
