= Thanlwin Bridge (Mawlamyine) =

Thanlwin (Mawlamyaing) Bridge
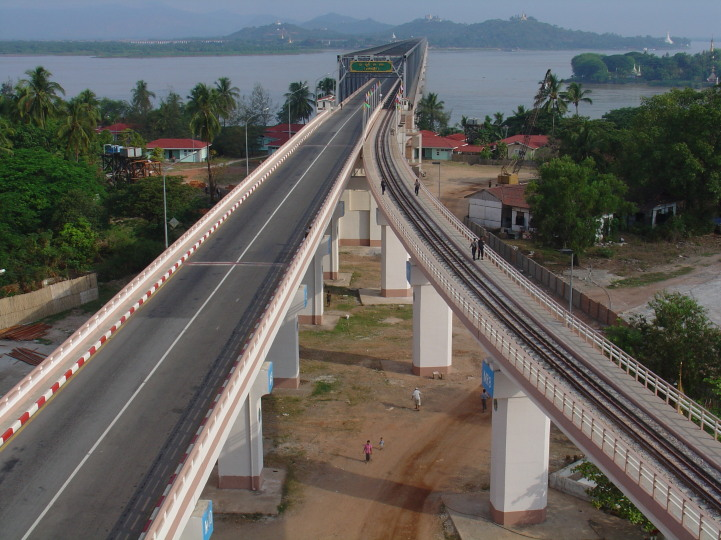
- သံလွင်တံတား (မော်လမြိုင်)
- Coordinates: 16°30′40″N 97°37′04″E
- Carries: 2 lanes (SB and NB), 1 rail track (14 ft), 2 sidewalks(6 ft each)
- Crosses: Salween River via Shampoo Island
- Locale: Mawlamyaing and Mottama, Mon State
- Official name: Thanlwin Bridge, (Mawlamyaing)
- Maintained by: Ministry of Transportation

Characteristics
- Design: Steel Frame Truss bridge, & Cantilever Bridges and Access Bridges
- Total length: Road bridge 1,624 ft (495 m) Mawlamyaing Bank, 2,252 ft (686 m) Mottama Bank, Main Frame 7,699 ft (2,347 m) or 2.2 miles (3.1 km) (total bridge); Rail bridge 6,442 ft (1,964 m) Mawlamyaing Bank, 7,498 ft (2,285 m) Mottama Bank, Main Frame 7,699 ft (2,347 m), 21,618 ft (6,589 m) or 4.1 miles (total bridge)
- Width: 2 traffic lanes ~28 feet (~ 8.5 m), single rail track~14 ft(~4.3 m), 2 Sidewalks (~12 ft)

History
- Construction start: 18 March 2000
- Construction end: 18 April 2005
- Opened: 17 April 2006

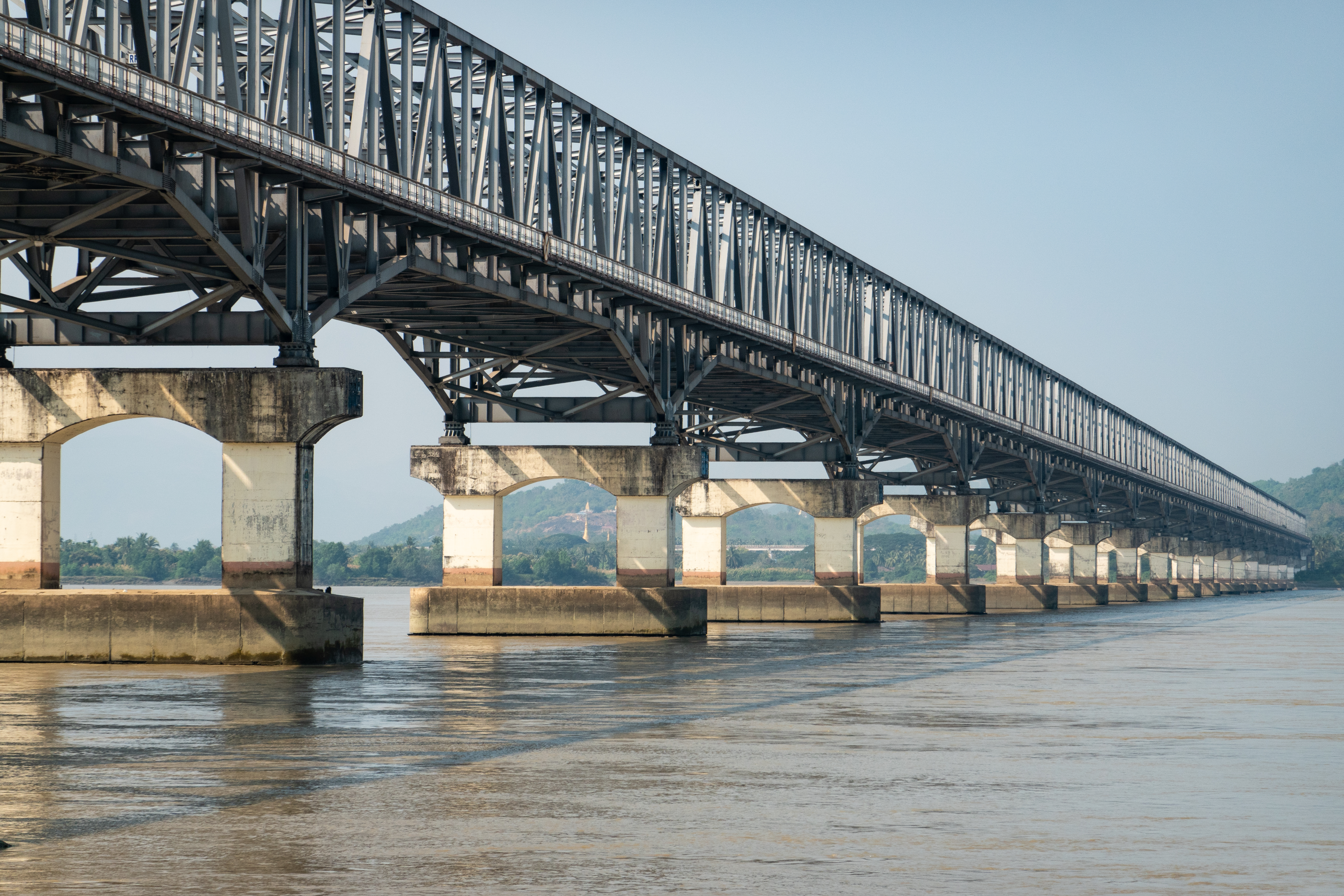

Thanlwin Bridge (Mawlamyaing) was the longest bridge in Myanmar before the construction of the Pakouku Bridge and it connects the city of Mawlamyaing with Mottama. Constructed at the confluence of the Thanlwin, Gyaing and Attayan rivers in Mon State, the bridge has a two-mile (3 km)-long motor road and a four-mile (6 km)-long railroad as well as pedestrian lanes.

The approach structure of the rail bridge on the Mawlamyaing bank is 1.22 miles (1,960 m) long, while on the Mottama bank is 1.42 miles (2,290 m) long. The total length of the rail bridge is 4.1 miles (6,600 m) long. The Ministry of Construction was responsible for the designing and building the bridge.

== See also ==
- Rail transport in Myanmar
- Myanmar Railways
- Myanmar Longest and Largest Bridge
