= Economy of the Empire of Japan =

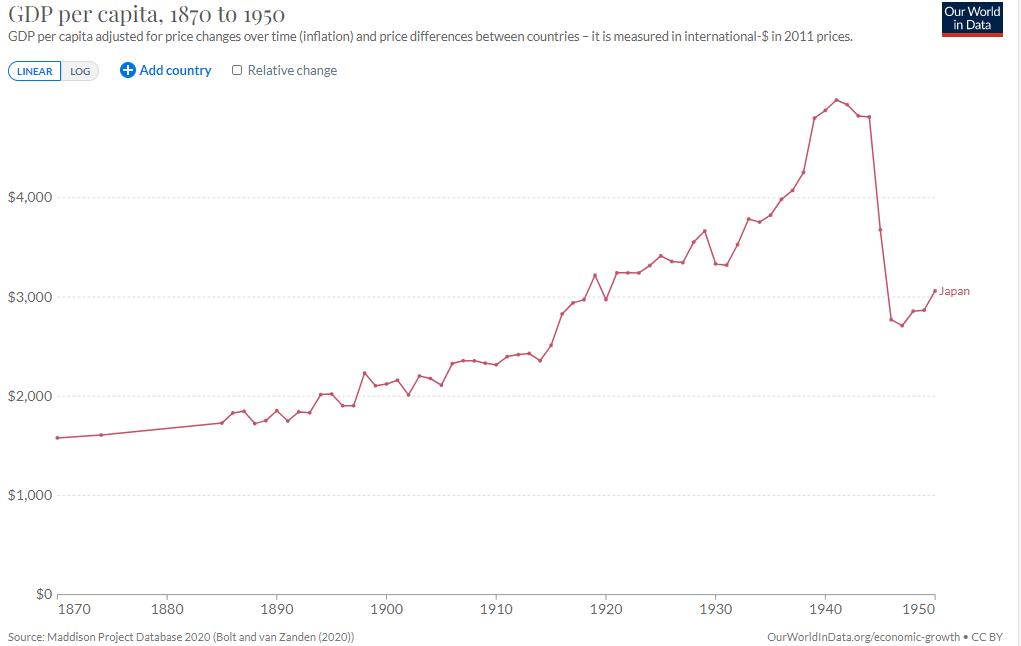
GDP per capita of Japan from 1870 to 1950

The economy of the Empire of Japan refers to the period in Japanese economic history in Imperial Japan that began with the Meiji Restoration in 1868 and ended with the Surrender of Japan in 1945 at the end of World War II. It was characterized by a period of rapid industrialization in the late nineteenth and early twentieth centuries, and the dominance of a wartime economy from 1938 to 1945.

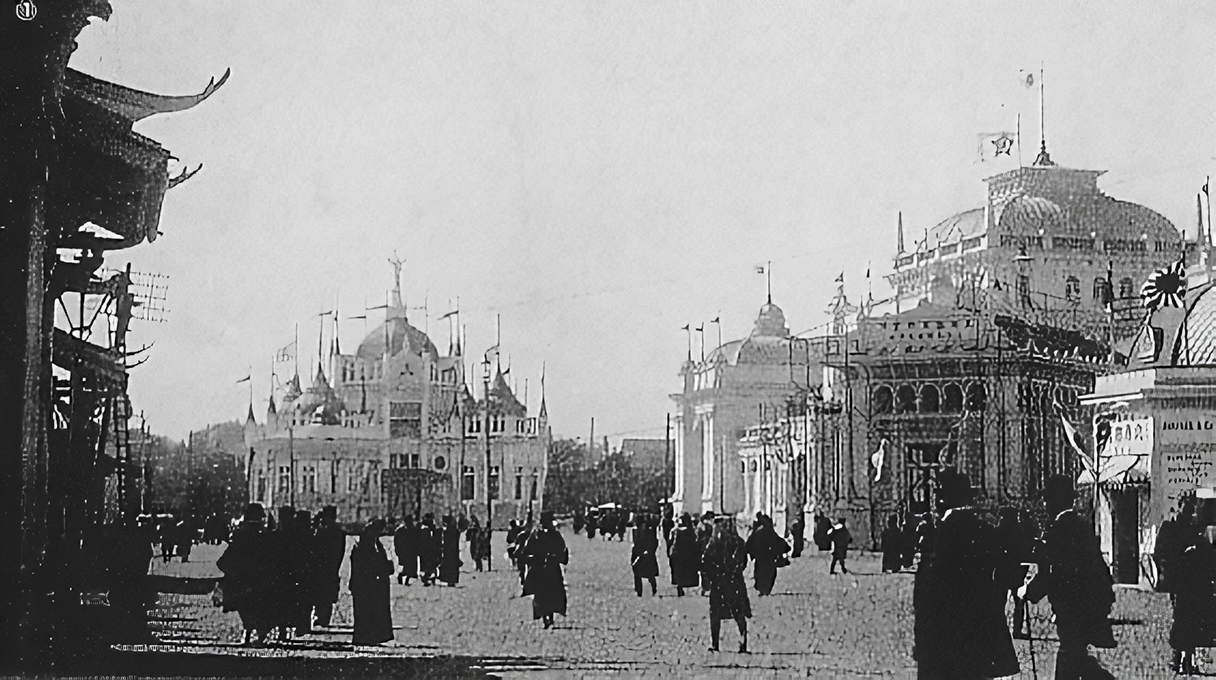
Tokyo Industrial Exhibition, 1907

== Proto-industrial base ==
The Tokugawa Japan during a long period of “closed country” autarky between the mid-seventeenth century and the 1850s had achieved a high level of urbanization; well-developed "road networks; the channeling of river water flow with embankments and the extensive elaboration of irrigation ditches that supported and encouraged the refinement of rice cultivation based upon improving seed varieties, fertilizers and planting methods especially in the Southwest with its relatively long growing season; the development of proto-industrial (craft) production by merchant houses in the major cities like Osaka and Edo and its diffusion to rural areas after 1700; and the promotion of education and population control among both the military elite (the samurai) and the well-to-do peasantry in the eighteenth and early nineteenth centuries. At the time, Japan's agricultural productivity was high enough to sustain substantial craft (proto-industrial) production in both rural and urban areas of the country prior to industrialization.

== Fukoku Kyohei (1868–1887) ==
=== Policies ===
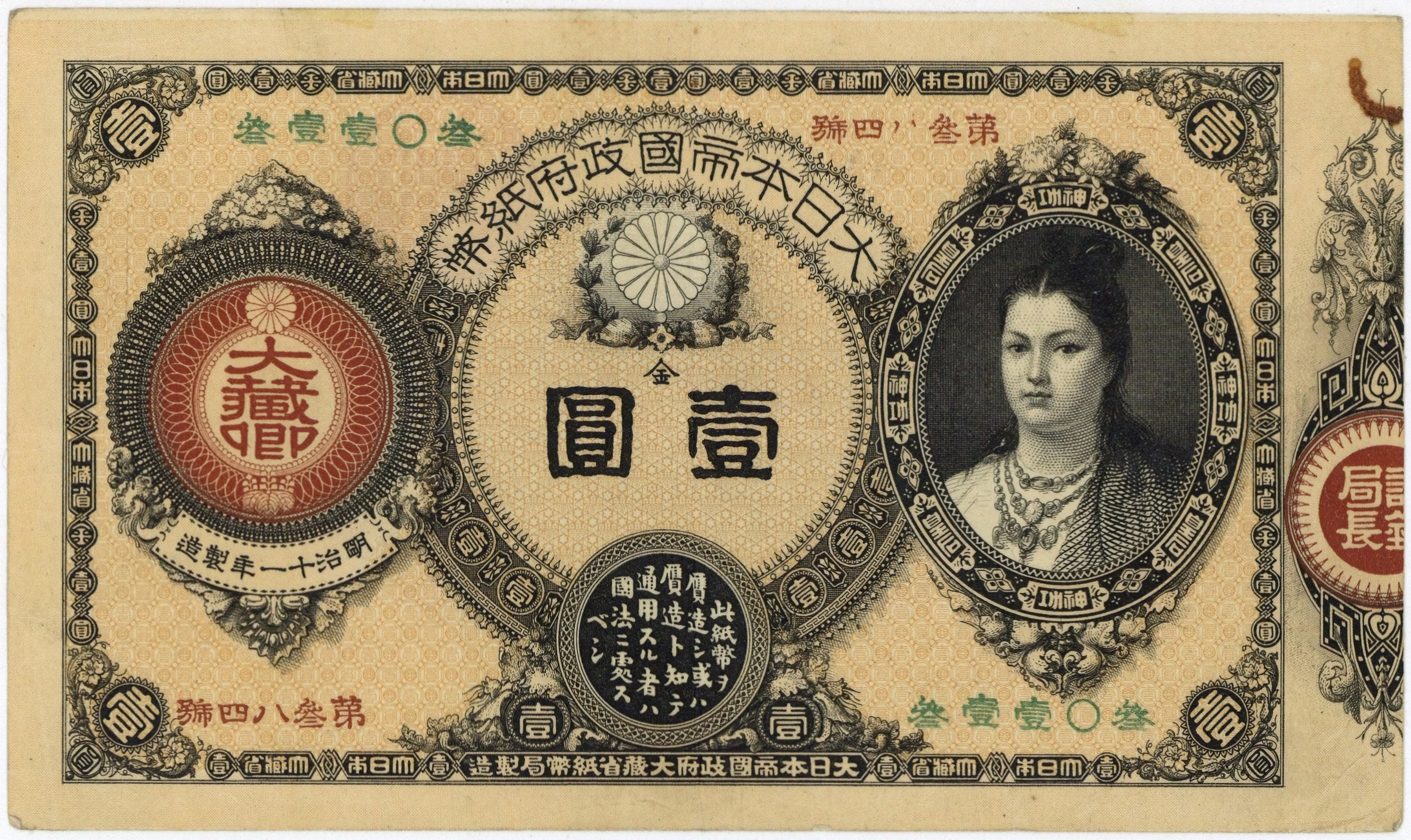
A 1-yen banknote, 1881

The official government entities that guided the Japanese national economy were the Economy and Finance Ministry, the Bank of Japan, and the Industry and Commerce Ministry. For military spending, there was the Navy Ministry and the Army Ministry.

=== Domestic investment ===
Domestic investment in industry and infrastructure was the driving force behind growth in Japanese output. Both private and public sectors invested in infrastructure, national and local governments serving as coordinating agents for infrastructure build-up.

=== Finance ===
==== Private banking ====
The Ministry of Finance created the Bank of Japan in 1882, laying the foundations for a private banking system backed up a lender of last resort.

The Noguchi Family made their principal investments in banking, commerce, and industry in Korea during the Japanese occupation. With their funds, the zaibatsu and the Japanese government founded the Bank of Chōsen, the central banking institution in the province, which was linked with the Central Bank of Manchou.

== Infrastructure and manufacturing expand (1887–1938) ==
=== Infrastructure ===
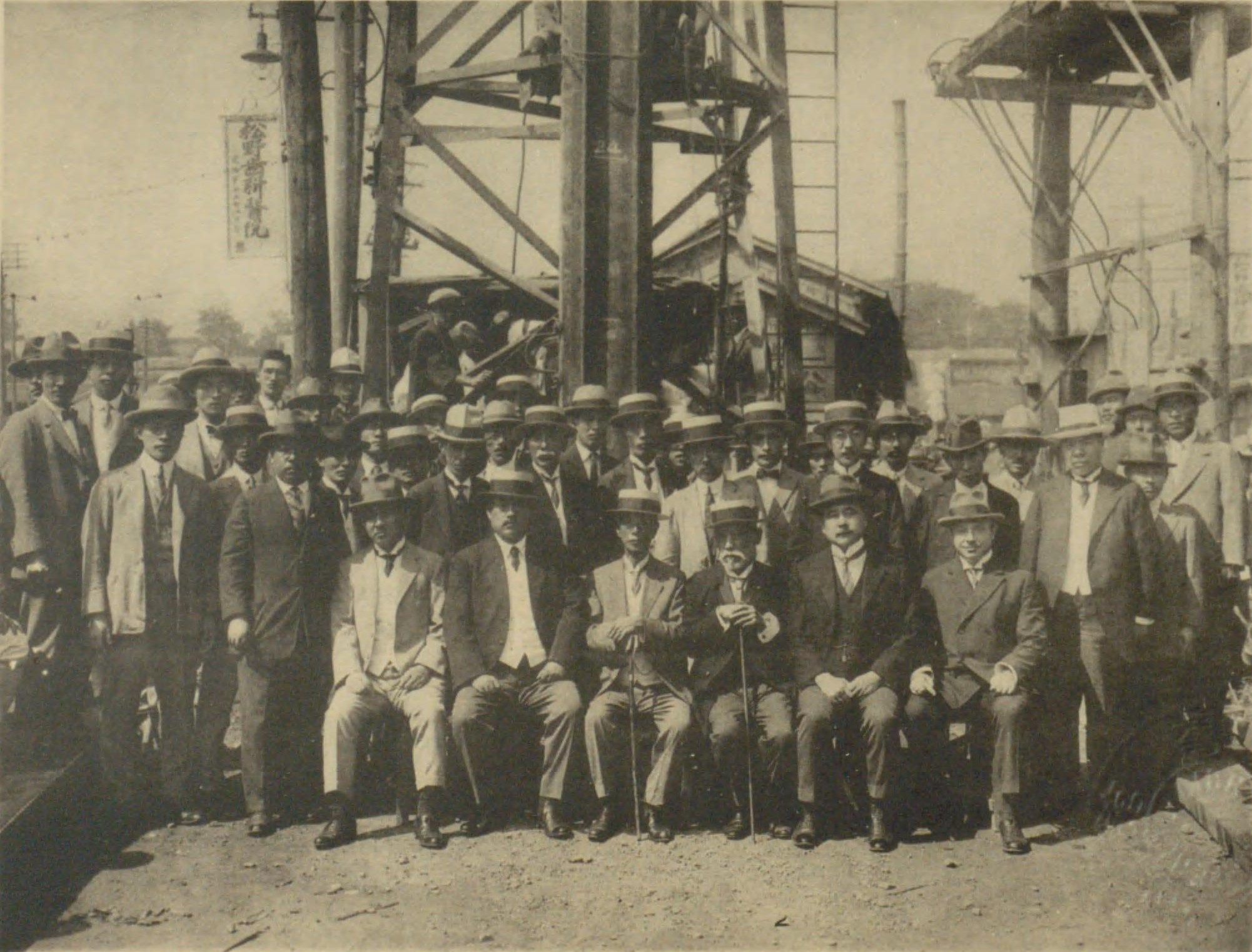
Groundbreaking ceremony of Ginza Line, the oldest subway line in Asia, 1925

=== Industrial sector ===
Year	Coal production (tonnes)
1875	600,000
1885	1,200,000
1895	5,000,000
1905	13,000,000
1913	21,300,000

Year	Length of train track (mi)
1872	18
1883	240
1887	640
1894	2,100
1904	4,700
1914	7,100

Year(s)	Annual average raw silk production / export (tonnes)
1868–1872	1,026 / 646
1883	1,682 / 1347
1889–1893	4,098 / 2,444
1899–1903	7,103 / 4,098
1909–1914	12,460 / 9,462

==== Naval construction ====
In 1893 naval construction was in the range 177,000 to 1,528,000 tonnes. In 1913 this increased to 3,565,000 tonnes. In 1924 with 237 500-tonnes vessels and 11 10,000-tonnes and reaching 4,140,000 tonnes in 1928. The Japanese Navy was third in the world behind British and American Navies and dominated the West Pacific area before the war. The first modern Shipyard was built in 1891, and since then naval construction rapidly advanced. Japanese boats of more than 100 tonnes represented a total registered tonnage of 5,007,000 tonnes out of 1,198,000 corresponding to naval construction of 1936–1938. This put Japan in third place between maritime powers, a notable realization in such a short time. The old vessels were destroyed or disarmed which is why the regular fleet was efficient and modern. Without a scarcity of petrol at the time, many of these modern vessels were designed for that energy source.

Year	Number of steamships
1873	26
1894	169
1904	797
1913	1,514

==== Military industry ====
- Navy: Aichi, Kawanishi, Showa/Nakajima, Nihon, Maeda, Yokosuka, Watanabe, Kyūshū, Kugisho, Mizuno, and Funryu.
- Army: Nikkoku, Yokoi, Maeda, Rikugun/Kokukosho, Rikugun/Kogiken, Tachikawa, Kawasaki, Kokusai, and Kayaba.
- Both: Nakajima, Mitsubishi
- Manchukuo: Manshū and other related companies.

==== Forestry ====
Local forestry represented a production of 14,000,000 meters of wood with a value of ¥75,000,000, a total value of ¥50,000,000 in cut wood, ¥3,000,000 in bamboo and other secondary wood products for a total value of ¥100,000,000. The local forests covered 200,000 km^{2}, 90,000 km^{2} under State administration or Imperial Family reserves. And, taking part in scientific forest research during the latter years. Coal of wood was valued at 100,000,000 yen. Sugi (Cryptomeria) represented a quarter of the total quantity, Pine more than 20% in quantity and value and the Hinoki (Chamaecyparis Obtusa) only 1/4% of quantity, but more than 9% in value.

Despite many forests and their importance, Japan continued to buy wood overseas. In accordance with the other dates, Japan had 200,000 km^{2} of forest, 100,000 km^{2} in private hands, the other 75,000 km^{2} in state control and 12,000 km^{2} owned by the Imperial House. Wood exports were made to the rest of the Japanese empire and to foreign markets.

==== Paper and cellulose industry ====
Since ancient times, Japan has manufactured assorted paper types by hand. A modern mechanized industry appeared in 1872 and became one of the most important industries in the nation. The total production was about 1,000,000 tonnes of paper and cardboard. cellulose paste, the principal prime material, was made in Shikoku, Hokkaido and Karafuto. The cellulose production resulted in 8% of U.S. manufacture; the Cellulose industry in Japan developed in Shikoku, North Honshū, Hokkaido, Chosen, Manchukuo and Karafuto. In Karafuto was the Shiretoru Cellulose Factory, the most advanced installation dedicated to the cellulose industry in all of East Asia. The first place where European-type paper was manufactured in Japan was in the city of Shikuka. Additionally, to complement this local production, these products were sold in Canada and the United States.

==== Fishing ====
The important Okhotsk fisheries had a value of ¥50 million. Other fisheries in Chosen, Karafuto, South Mandate and Formosa came to ¥122,000,000 and ¥358,000,000 from Japan proper, for a total of ¥480,000,000 (1938 figures). Secondary products from fishing had a value of ¥150 million to ¥200 million. (From another source, fishing values were of ¥235,000,000 and ¥275,000,000 from 1919 to 1913, more than the British.)

In 1932, Japan invested $550,000,000 in Korea, along with $320,000,000 in 1938. This investment produced a return of 400% in industrial monetary value. In the fishing industry, Japan extracted a value of $20,000,000 annually, comprising 15% of world fishing volumes at the time.

Coastal fishing represented 61% of the total value, with a fleet of 364,260 small boats, of which 20% had engines; the rest were sailing boats. High seas fishing represented 28% of the industry, with whaling, coral and pearl collecting and pisciculture on land making up the rest. The high seas vessels operated in the North Pacific area (Alaska coasts), to the South Pacific. During Japanese administration, the fishing in the Kwantung leased territory was 61,000 tonnes.

In 1938, the fish factory vessels packed 204,000,000 packages of crab and 370 packages of sea salmon. In the same year, four whale hunting vessels fished in the waters around the Antarctic. Factories were built in Chisima, Hokkaido, Karafuto, Taiwan, Chosen, Kyūshū, Shikoku and other coastal areas to process fish products.

The Japanese and Russian oil wells, in the same oil zone, were strictly controlled to ensure equitable exploitation. The pits stayed in direct connection with the Moskalvo port on the west coast of Ohka through a network of oil pipelines.

In 1925, the Soviet Government granted Japan petroliferous and carbonaceous concessions in North Sakhalin to Mitsubishi, Itoh-Korada, Mitsui and other Japanese Companies for a period of 45 years. By Protocols and agreements signed in Moscow in May 1944, these concessions expired 26 years before the accorded time in 1970, while a new Japanese-Russian accord over fishing conventions agreed to the formal retirement of some Japanese fisheries in the Far East to Japanese concessors, the right of Soviet Organizations to buy annually and for auction 10% of Japanese fish shares, and a supplementary payment in gold for Japanese owners.

When modifying these fishing conventions in 1928, according to the activities of Soviet Fishing Organizations, citizens were subject to substantial reductions. The Japanese-Russian accord of March 1944 cancelled all restrictions previously observed.

Japanese subjects and foreigners were banned from fishing in certain maritime zones in the Far East under an agreement made with the Soviet Government in July 1941. The Japanese Government also guaranteed that fishing rights on the East Coast of Kamchatka and Olyutorsk were not taken up by the Japanese.

==== Others ====
Other significant industries were chemicals (30%) along with metal and machinery (10%) with a total 1,000,000 of workers in these areas, plus woodworking, textiles, foods, and handicrafts.

== Wartime economy (1938–1945) ==
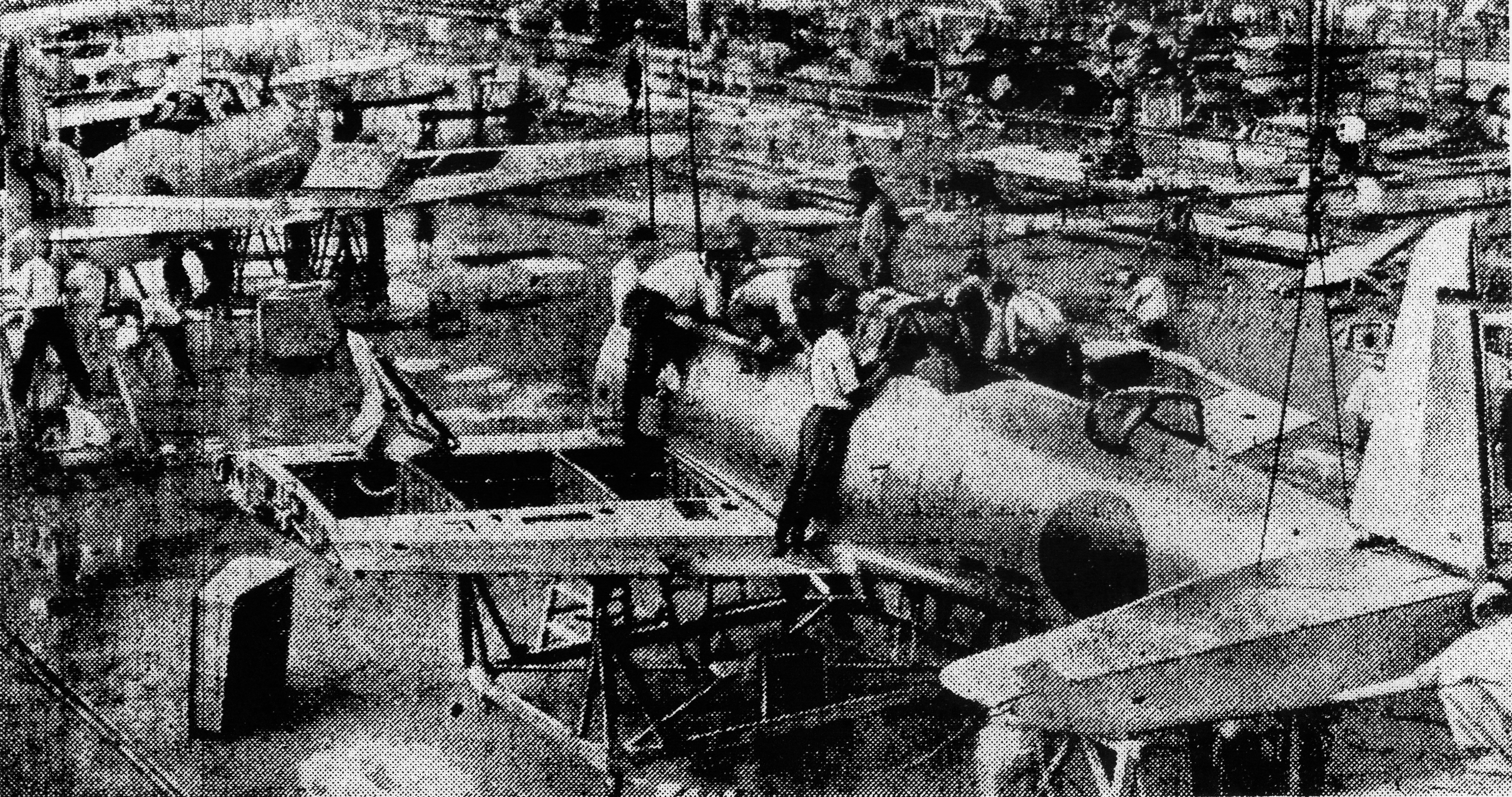
Assembly work at Nakajima-Handa, 20 September 1944

=== Use of occupied territories ===
From 1937, during the Japanese military occupation of territories in China, they controlled certain mineral deposits in those areas. They fall into three sectors:

Deposits of tungsten, tin and manganese, also.

- Zhejiang: coal reserves were 101 million tonnes and extraction 250,000 tonnes in 1934. There were certain soils rich in bauxite.
- Fujian: coal reserves of 500 million tonnes in 1934.
- Guangdong: 421 million tonnes of coal reserves and production was 338,000 tonnes in 1934. Iron reserves in Hainan, with 400 million tonnes of iron of high grade in 1934. A small tungsten production, also.
- Guangxi: coal reserves of 300 million tonnes, and production of 30,000 tonnes in 1940. There were some sources of tungsten, manganese (production of 1,246 tonnes in 1940) and a tin production of 417,000 tonnes too.
- Hunan: coal reserves were 1,793 million tonnes and extraction of 1,050,000 tonnes in 1940. Some deposits of tungsten, mercury, antimony (Hsikwangshan mine), manganese and gold.
- Guizhou: coal reserves were 1,549 million tonnes, and extraction 360,750 tonnes in 1940. Deposits of mercury, copper, antimony, and sulphur also.

Military occupation of South East Asia by Japanese forces added further resources and strategic locations.

- Burma: in the Irrawaddy river zone, there were the Yenangyaung and Chauk oil fields, 300 miles (500 km) north of Rangoon. These sources and other in Singu extracted 260,000,000 gallons in 1938, and there was an unexploited coal deposit. This nation had other minerals: amber and jade (nefrite stone), lapis lazuli, lazurite, rubies, extraction 141,490 carats (28.298 kg) in 1937, sapphires, etc. in Shan Mesete. There was a major mine in Bawdwin, producing silver, lead, zinc, nickel and copper. This deposit produced 72,000 tonnes of lead and ones 5,000,000 ounces in 1933, rock with content 20% of lead and zinc as a mineral. In Mergui and Tavoy (Tenasserin area) mines produced tungsten and tin from 1910. Tin extraction rose to 6,623 tonnes in 1937.
- Thailand: in its ranges were abundant sources of tin, which were extracted for mining, and from rivers. On the south coast guano was mined for fertilizer production.
- French Indochina: in Honggay (near Haipong) extracted ones 2,308,000 tonnes of coal in 1937. Minerals included Tungsten, Chromium, Tin, antimony and manganese in the northern area and Phosphate rock in the southern area. These minerals were extracted to export in bulk for processing abroad.
- Malacca: Tin extraction was in the hands of its Chinese citizens; production in 1939 was 55,950 tonnes or some 30% of world production. There were tin factories in Singapore and Penang for processing local extractions, and those of Thailand, Burma and Indochina. In the same area, Japanese pre-war investment had related to bauxite, iron and manganese. The Kelantan, Trengganu and Johore iron mineral extractions represented 1,944,701 tonnes in 1939; the manganese was from Kelantan and Trengganu and Bauxite provided from Johore in the same year. Other Japanese mining investments were in the Dutch island of Bintang and existing coal deposits.
- Dutch Indies: Its minerals were scarce but had important value. The oil in the Palembang (Sumatra), Djambi, Medan and Borneo fields in Balikpapan and Tarakan produced 7,938,000 tonnes in 1940; perhaps a greater yield than California and Iran. Coal was in Sumatra and Borneo, with 1,456,647 tonnes mined in the same year. Additionally, there were sulphur and manganese in Java, and nickel in Celebes. Tin came from Banka and the Billington Islands, which extracted 43,900 tonnes in 1940. The Japanese mining business in the Bintang Island tin deposits produced 275,000 tonnes that year, supposedly one sixth of world production.
- Philippines: Its mining industry had spectacularly developed during the U.S. administration. It produced more gold than Alaska, or any other American state apart from California. Gold extraction in 1941 represented 1,109,000 troy oz (34,500 kg), five times more than in 1931, and silver associated with gold ore at the same level. These extractions proceeded mostly from the Benget district in Baguio, Luzon. Iron deposits were rapidly developed and during 1941 1,191,641 tonnes was exported to Japan. Iron sources were located in North Camarines (Luzon), Samar Island and Surigao in Mindanao island. In the last of these, the iron reserves were estimated as 500 million tonnes; Laterithic minerals with the content of silicon, sulphur, phosphorus, and iron content of 48% were of easy extraction from coastal areas. Chromium was not discovered until 1935, but the Philippines in 1939 produced 164,000 tonnes and had a fifth place, or 11%, of world production. Sources were in Zambales (Luzon) with its extraction of 10 million tonnes, chrome oxide with a high 50% of chrome content. Manganese was abundant but of medium quality, and was sent to the US from 1935; the local production was 58,038 tonnes in 1940. There were also copper, lead, zinc and coal.

In total or partial control:

- New Guinea: certain Gold deposits in Bulolo (East New Guinea) with other minerals in these islands.
- Nauru: certain sources of phosphates.
- Gilberts: are other deposits of phosphates.
- Salomon: sources of gold, copper and phosphates.
- Palau Islands: Source of bauxite

Due to the great transportation distances, the frequent sinking of Japanese merchant vessels, the downing of transport aircraft, guerrilla and local resistance movements' strikes against mines, centers and transport lines as well as allied aerial attacks against occupied areas and colonial administrative difficulties in managing these large territories outside Japan, the Japanese Empire could not take advantage of these natural resources and many mineral exports were not available to Japanese markets and industries during the Pacific War.

=== State General Mobilization Law ===
On 24 March 1938, Prime Minister Fumimaro Konoe legislated the State General Mobilization Law, where the government increasingly nationalized the private sector to create an effective war economy.

== See also ==
- Agriculture in the Empire of Japan
- Demographics of Imperial Japan
- Economic history of Japan
- Japanese heavy industry during WW2 times
- Japanese mining and energy resources (WWII)
- Japanese exterior Commerce during WW2 Times
- Japanese-German pre-WWII industrial co-operation
- Japanese Nuclear Weapons Development
- Empire of Japan (foreign commerce and shipping)
