= History of rail transport in Myanmar =

Rail transport in Myanmar (then Burma) began in 1877. Three private rail companies were nationalised nineteen years later. During the Japanese occupation of Burma, Allied prisoners of war were forced to build the Burma Railway. Myanmar Railways has expanded its network somewhat since 1988.

== 1877–1895 ==
Rail transport was introduced in Burma in May 1877 (when Lower Burma was a colony of the United Kingdom and part of British India) with the opening of the Rangoon-to-Prome line by the Irrawaddy Valley State Railway. The 163-mile (262 km) line, following the Irrawaddy River, was built over a three-year period with labour imported from India (particularly the areas affected by the Bihar famine of 1873–74). Unusually for a British colonial railway, it was built to 1,000 mm (3 ft 3 3/8 in) metre gauge. In 1884 the Sittang Valley State Railway, a new company, opened a 166-mile (267 km) line along the Sittang River from Rangoon to Toungoo via Pegu. The Irrawaddy line was considered commercially important because it could transport rice from the valley to the main port at Rangoon, and the Sittang line was strategically important because of Toungoo's proximity to the border with Upper Burma (then part of the Ava kingdom). This became evident at the start of the Third Anglo-Burmese War (a year after Sittang line opened) and during the unrest which followed the war. The construction of the two lines cost £1,926,666; the railway was profitable by 1888, returning more than five percent on capital investment. With the annexation of Upper Burma, the railway was extended by 220 miles (350 km) from Toungoo to Mandalay (the fallen capital of the Ava kingdom) in 1889. The Mu Valley State Railway was formed after the opening of this section, and construction began on a rail line from Sagaing to Myitkyina connecting Mandalay to Shwebo (1891), Wuntho (1893), Katha (1895) and Myitkyina (1898). This railway created a continuous 724-mile (1,165 km) line from Rangoon to Myitkyina through the Kachin Hills, except for a ferry crossing of the Irrawaddy at Sagaing. The Inwa Bridge at Sagaing, Burma's only bridge across the Irrawaddy, opened in 1934 with two decks: one for road traffic and one for trains.

== 1896–1945 ==
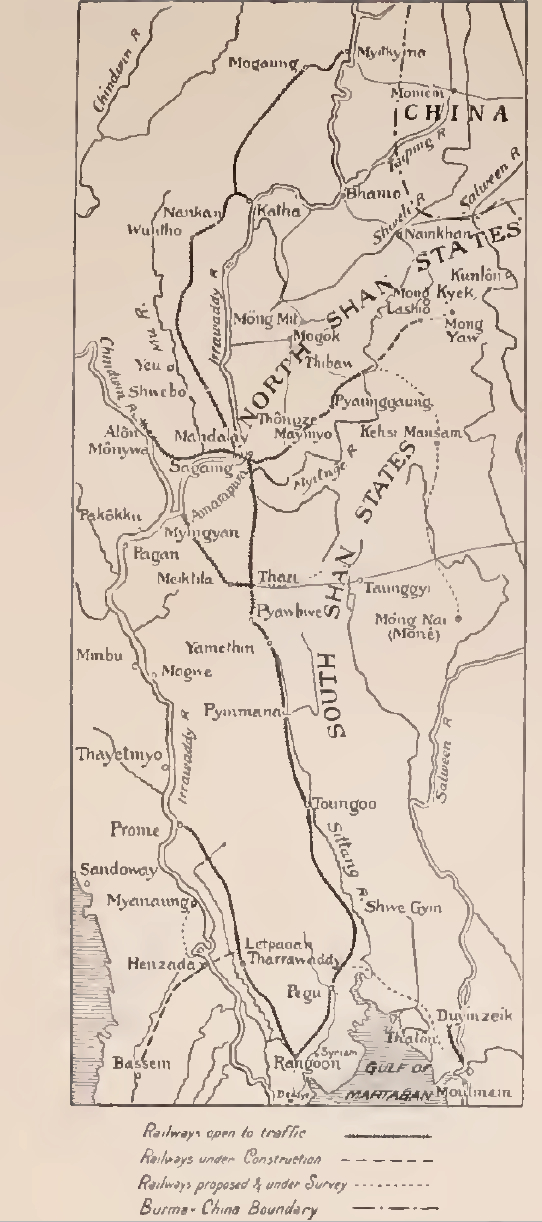
The Burmese rail network in 1900

In 1896, before the completion of the line to Myitkyina, the rail companies were combined into the publicly owned Burma Railway Company. Between 1898 and 1905, another 278 miles (447 km) of railway was built. A 110-mile (180 km) branch line from the Rangoon-Pyay railroad connected Bassein in the Irrawaddy delta to Rangoon, and the Mandalay–Lashio Railway ran 117 miles (188 km) through the Shan Hills (nearly to the border with China). The latter railway included the Gokteik viaduct, a 2,260-foot-long (690 m), 320-foot-high (98 m) viaduct across the Gokteik gorge near Nawnghkio. When it was built, it was the longest such viaduct in the world. The track rises in a continuous 1:40 gradient, and the viaduct (designed by Alexander Rendel & Sons and built by the Pennsylvania Steel Company) was considered an engineering marvel at the time. The Mandalay-Lashio railway was planned to extend to Kunlong (on the border) and into China's Yunnan province, but the plan was abandoned because of the difficult terrain. In 1907, a line opened connecting Pegu and Moulmein (the capital of British Burma before the Second Anglo-Burmese War). The line ran to Martaban, on the Gulf of Martaban at the mouth of the Salween River, and passengers had to take a ferry to Moulmein. Until the Thanlwin Bridge opened in 2006, it was impossible to travel from Rangoon to Moulmein by rail. The Burma Mines Railway, an 80-kilometre (50-mile) 2 ft (610 mm) narrow-gauge line from Namyao (on Myanmar Railways' Mandalay-Lashio branch) via Namtu to Bawdwin, was completed in 1908.

After the First World War, a line was built between Moulmein and Ye at the northern end of the Mergui Archipelago. Burma's last major rail line, from Thazi on the Rangoon-Mandalay line to Kalaw (a hill station in the southern Shan State) was built between 1914 and 1918. In 1928, the Burma Railway Company was dissolved; the railways were brought directly under government operation and renamed Burma Railways. Around this time, they began to lose money because of competition from road transport. With return on capital declining, Burma Railways became the country's single largest debt item when the financial separation of India and Burma took place in 1937. The company's coal and rolling stock were imported from India or Britain.

=== Siam-Burma Railway ===
The British had long planned to construct a railway line connecting India with Siam (now Thailand) and China. British companies examined the possibility of building a railway from Rangoon to Yunnan to link with a second line from Bangkok to Yunnan, but were unable to obtain financial backing.

When the Japanese occupied Thailand and Burma, they decided to build a railway connecting their Southeast Asian territories with Burma (partly to facilitate the movement of troops and supplies for their planned invasion of India). Since Yunnan was in Chinese hands under Chiang Kai-shek, they looked for a southern route to Burma from Thailand and settled on a line from Ban Pong to Thanbyuzayat across the mountains separating the two countries. Since Thanbyuzayat was on the Moulmein-Ye railway line and Ban Pong connected to Bangkok via Kanchanaburi, the line would provide a direct connection (with a ferry from Moulmein to Martaban) between Bangkok and Rangoon. The Japanese built the lines with Allied prisoners of war, and an estimated 15,000 POWs and 150,000 others died during the construction of the 245-mile (394 km) railway – about 675 deaths per mile. Its construction is depicted in the film, The Bridge on the River Kwai.

== 1945 to present ==
In 1942, The country had 3,313 kilometres (2,059 mi) of metre-gauge track in 1942, but during World War II the Japanese removed about 480 kilometres (300 mi). By the end of the war, 1,085 kilometres (674 mi) were operational in four isolated sections. During the postwar era, the rail network was rebuilt. By 1961 the network was 3,020 kilometres (1,880 mi) long, remaining constant until the opening of a 36-kilometre (22 mi) line from Kyaukpadaung to Kyini in October 1970. This began an upsurge in construction and track-doubling, and Myanmar Railways operated 11 divisions over 5,068 kilometres (3,149 mi) of track by 2000. Most routes are single-track, although large portions of the Yangon-Pyay and Yangon-Mandalay routes are double-track. The railway had a total length of 5,125 kilometres (3,185 mi) in December 2008, including the Yangon-Mandalay line's double-track section.

=== Improvements ===
- 1988: Thaton-Myaingalay (new 36.3-km line)
- 1989: Dabeyin-Hle Lawin (new 34.6-km line)
- 1990: Mandalay Circular Railway modernisation (21.8 km)
- 1992: Shwenyaung-Yauksauk (60.3 km) and Tada-U-Myingyan lines (99.8 km), including a line to Mandalay International Airport
- 1993: Three lines:
  - Aungban-Loi-kaw (164 km), in Kayah State
  - Chaung-U-Tawkyaungyi (23.4 km), part of the 406.3-kilometre (252 mi) Chaung-U-Pakokku-Kalaymyo line
  - Minywa-Pakokku (54 km)
- 1994: Two lines:
  - Tada-U-Mandalay International Airport (11.8 km)
  - Pakokku-Myaing-Myozoe (55.7 km)
- 1995: Three lines:
  - Myozoe-Zipyar (44.2 km)
  - Namsang-Moe-Ne (44.3 km), the first section of the eastern extension of the Thazi-Shwenyaung line
  - Tavoy-Yephu (17.2 km), part of the 177-kilometre (110 mi) Mawlamyaing-Ye-Tavoy line
- 1996: Four lines:
  - Gangaw-Natchaung (110.8 km)
  - Myitkyina-Nantpaung-Airport (11.7 km)
  - Taunggyi-Phamon-Banyin (54.3 km)
  - Pyay-Myade/Aunglan-Satthwa (145.4 km), an alternative line to Bagan
- 1997: Five lines:
  - Shwenyaung-Taunggyi (33.5 km)
  - Kyaukpadaung-Bagan
  - Kaloggyi-Yephu (141.6 km), part of the 177-kilometre (110 mi) Mawlamyaing-Ye-Dawei line
  - Taungdwingyi-Magwe (83.8 km)
  - Ye-U-Khin-U (25.7 km)
- 1998: Construction of the 100.8-mile (162.222-km) Ye-Dawei line begins.
- 2003: The 14.8-kilometre (9 mi) Okkphosu-Thilawa-Deep Sea Port line opens. The bridge over the Ye River on the Ye-Dawei line opens on 26 November.
- 2004: The 1.5-kilometre (1 mi) Hsinbyushin-Chindwin River section of the Mandalay-to-Pakokku line opens. The Yangon-Mandalay line is modernised and double-tracked.
- 2005: The Ye-Dawei line opens.
- 2006: The Thanlwin Bridge and Mawlamyine railway station open, connecting the line on the southern bank of the Salween River with the rest of the country. Construction of the 300-mile (483-km) Kyangin-Pakokku line begins.
- 2007: The Pyinmana-Myohaung section of the Yangon-Mandalay line is double-tracked in November to serve the country's new capital, Naypyidaw.
- 2008: Construction of the 95-mile (153-km) Katha-Bhamo line begins on 1 January. Construction of the 63-kilometre (39 mi) Kyangin-Okshippin section of the 515-kilometre (320 mi) Kyangin-Pakokku line begins on 1 March, and construction of the 128-mile (205-km) Dawei-Myeik line begins on 6 December. The 26-kilometre (16 mi) Pyawbwe-Phayangasu section of the Yangon-Taunggyi line (via Thazi) opens on 1 December.
- 2009: The 211-kilometre (131 mi) Tavoy (Dawei)-Myeik, 375-kilometre (233 mi) Namsan-Kengtung and 152-kilometre (94 mi) Pyawbwe-Natmauk-Magway lines open.

== See also ==
- List of railway stations in Myanmar
- Siam-Burma Death Railway – a documentary about Asian labourers (Indian Tamils, Burmese and Javanese) who worked as slaves on the Burma Railway during World War II
