= Mandalay–Lashio Railway =

Railway line in Myanmar

Mandalay–Lashio Railway မန္တလေး-လားရှိုး ရထားလမ်း
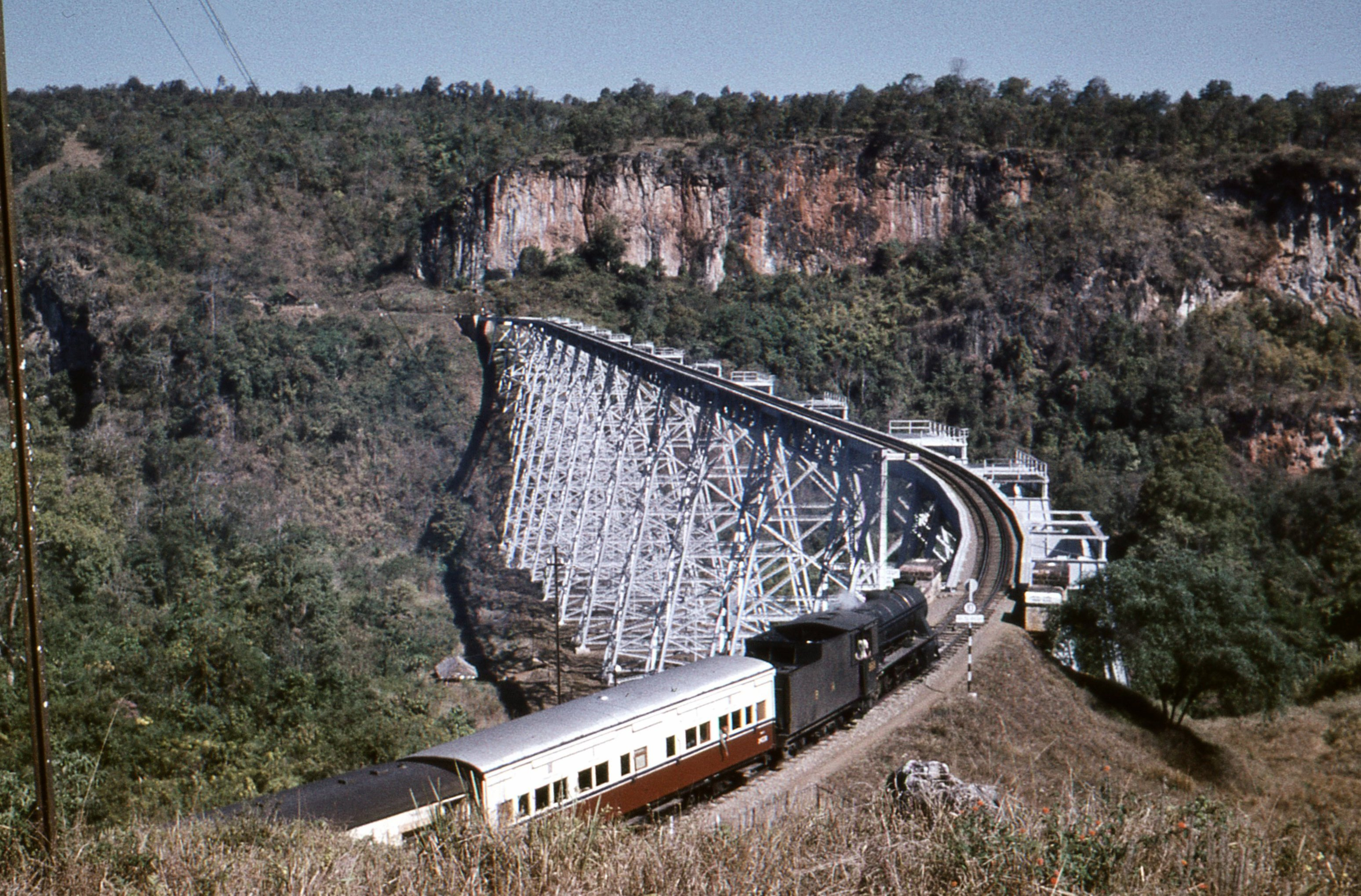
- Goteik viaduct

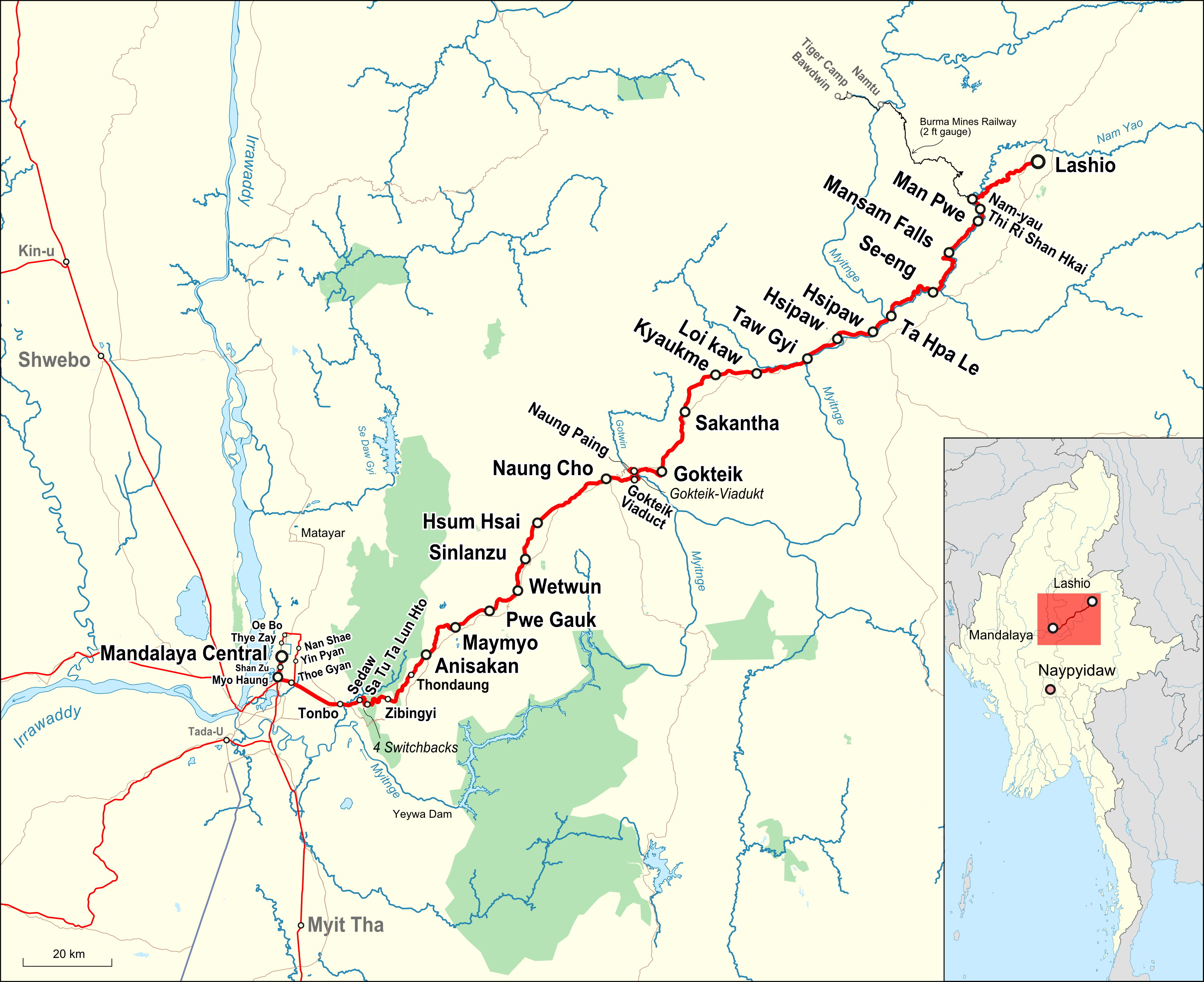

Overview
- Owner: Myanma Railways
- Locale: Mandalay Region, Shan State

Operation
- Began operation: 1903
- Operator: Myanma Railways

Technical
- System length: 286.5 km (178.0 mi)
- Track gauge: 1,000 mm (3 ft 3 3/8 in)

The Mandalay–Lashio Railway (Burmese: မန္တလေး-လားရှိုး ရထားလမ်း) also known as the Northern Shan State Railway (Burmese: ရှမ်းမြောက် မီးရထားလမ်း) is a 1,000 mm (3 ft 3 3/8 in) gauge railway line in Myanmar's Shan State, operated by Myanma Railways. The line runs from Mandalay Central Railway Station to Lashio Railway Station in 11 hours, with a proposal to extend further towards the Yunnan border from the current terminus with dual gauge rails. The section from Lashio to Muse and Yunnan is expected to be interoptable with both Chinese and Myanmar trains. There are a number of spur lines. There is another proposed project to allow Chinese trains to run 900 km from Kunming all the way to Kyaukpyu under Build-Operate-Transfer. Major stops in Pyin Oo Lwin, Kyaukme, Hsipaw. The line is in poor condition and in many sections the ride is extremely rough. The carriages with open windows trim the trackside vegetation as it moves and attendants sweep away the debris regularly during the journey. On the descent to Mandalay there is a back and forth switch back.

== History ==
The Northern Shan Railway was originally built so that British industrialists could obtain access to southern China, via Kunming. The line is still incomplete and has not extended past the northern Shan city of Lashio. It did provide access to the ancient Chinese silver and lead mines in Bawdwin, which were a major source of wealth for future US President Herbert Hoover.

The Goteik viaduct, a trestle bridge which, at the time of its construction, was the longest such span in the world, was completed in 1900 in record time. At the time, it was considered to be an engineering triumph.

== Stations ==
- Mandalay Central Railway Station via Myo Haung junction.
- (4) Myo Haung 382 3/4
- (24) Thoe Gyan 385 1/4 (Junction) to Tha Ye Ze
- (25) Tonbo 392 3/4 Spur Line to the quarry
- (26) Sedaw 396 1/4 Spur Line to the quarry
- (27) Sa Tu Ta Lun Hto 400 1/4 Zig Zag railway
- (28) Zi Pin Gyi 405
- (29) Thondaung 411
- (30) Anisakan 415
- (31) Pyin U Lwin 422 1/2
- (32) Pwe Kaul 427 3/4
- (33) Wet Wun 433 1/2
- (34) Sin Lan Su 438 1/4
- (35) Hsam Ma Hse 444
- (36) Nawnghkio 456
- (37) Gokteik 463 Gokteik Viaduct
- (38) Nawngpeng 472 1/4
- (39) Sa Khan Tha 482
- (40) Kyaukme 490
- (41) Loi Hkaw 496
- (42) Taw Gyi 504
- (43) Hsipaw 509 1/2
- (44) Ta Hpa Le 521
- (45) Sun Lon -
- (46) Se-eng 529 1/4
- (47) Man Sam Ye Da Gun (Man Sam Waterfall) 537 1/4
- (48) Man Pwe 543
- (49) Thi Ri Shan Hkai 545 1/4
- (50) Nam-yau 547 3/4 (Junction) to Namtu Mine Railway
- (51) Lashio Railway Station 560 3/4

=== under proposal ===
- Muse Station
