= Burma Mines Ltd. =

Mining corporation

Burma Mines, Ltd.
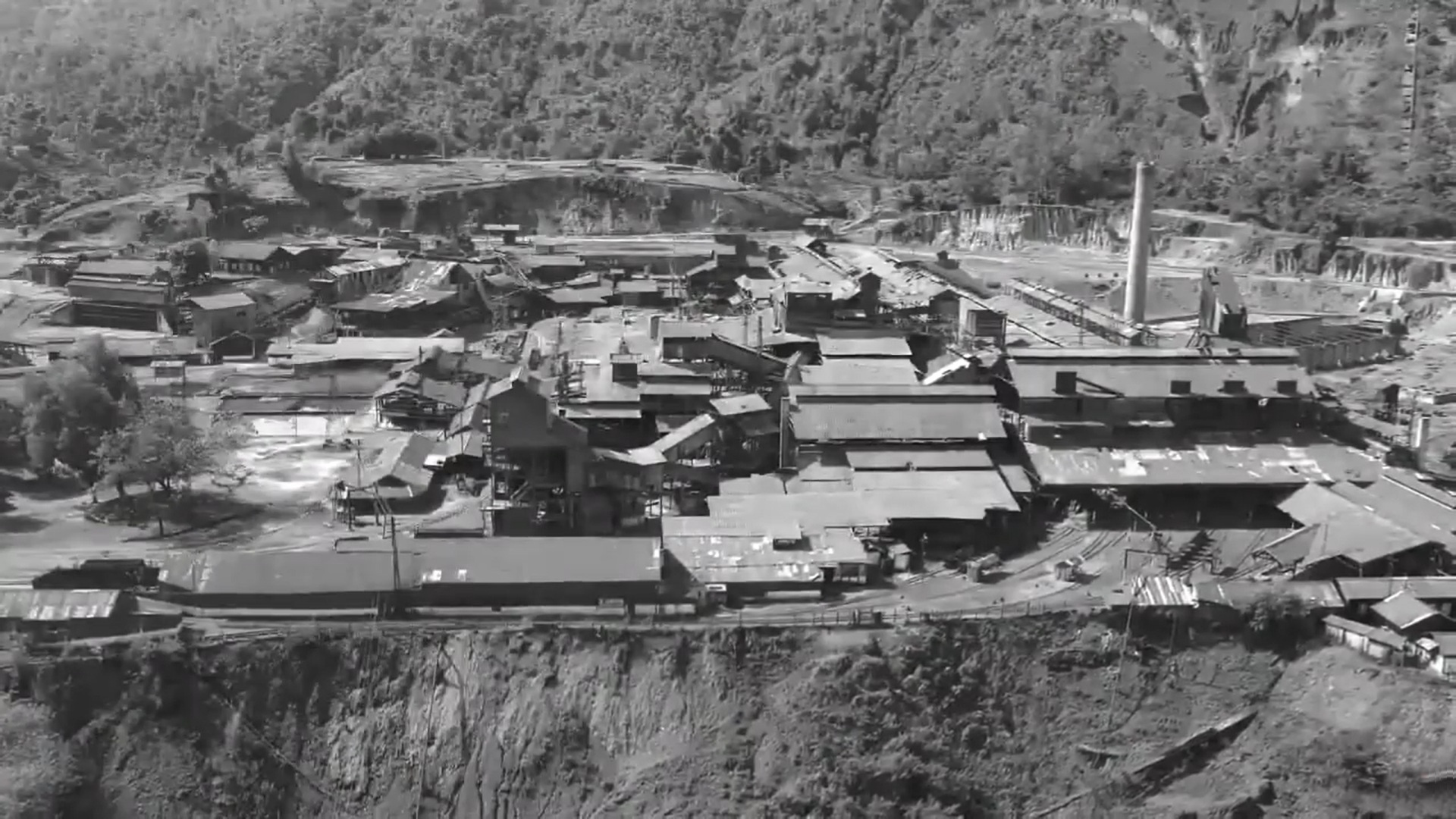
- Bawdwin Mine at Namtu before WW II
- Formerly: Burma Mines, Railway and Smelting Company, Ltd.
- Type: Subsidiary (Parent: Burma Corporation)
- Industry: Mining
- Founded: 1906 in London, England

Burma Mines, Ltd. or Burma Mines Limited was a British operating firm in Burma (now Myanmar) which operated one of the largest lead-zinc-silver mines in the world.

== Early history ==
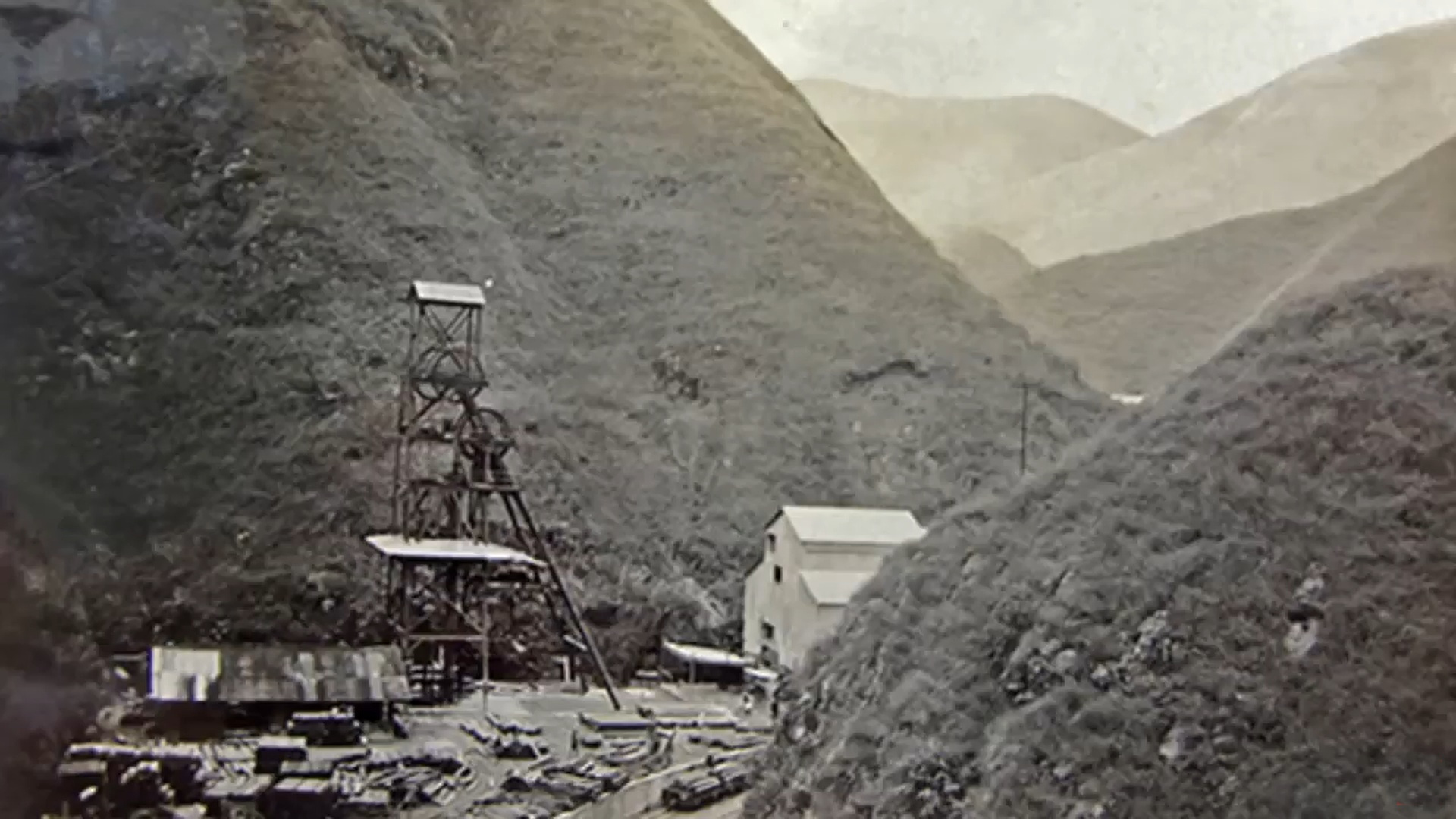
Historic photo of Bawdwin Mine at Namtu

Initially known as the Burma Mines, Railway and Smelting Company, Ltd., it was incorporated in 1906 in London, England. Later, in 1908, the name was shortened to Burma Mines, Ltd.

During the early 1900s, the British-owned Great Eastern Mining Company was the first to hold prospecting leases and mining rights at Bawdwin Mine in Namtu Township. Due to financial constraints, the Burma Mines, Railway and Smelting Company, Ltd. bought out the organization's interests relating to the development of the mine in Bawdwin. In its early days, Herbert Hoover of the Burma Corporation oversaw the site as a mining consultant. Records show mining production in the polymetallic mine in 1412 A.D. with the region later abandoned by 1868 amid the Panthay Rebellion. The Burma Mines company was solely interested in the recovery of the immense quantities of lead and zinc in the slag heaps left by the ancient Chinese silver mining operations. Extensive sampling of the lead-rich slag had been conducted before it was determined a profitable source of ore.

In 1909, the company completed the construction of a fifty-mile railroad known as the Burma Mines Railway. It was used to transport the slag exported at the mine to be treated at a smelter. Around 1911, the Burma Mines company moved their smeltery equipment from Mandalay to Namtu Township, in northern Shan State.

In 1913, engineers of the company discovered a massive silver-lead-zinc ore body on the mines' premises. The ore body was considered the world's largest high-grade silver-lead-zinc ore body. By 1918, the company erected a mill for concentrating the mine's lead, silver, and zinc ores under the supervision of American engineers and mechanics.

In August 1920, Sir Trevredyn Rashleigh Wynne, named chairman of the firm circa 1915, called a company meeting in London and announced the formation of a new company registered in India. The British operating firm withdrew from the mines and its smelting, milling, and power plant, leaving the mines and smelting activities in the hands of the Indian company. Burma Mines, Ltd. of England was liquidated to distribute its shares among its shareholders.
