= Mandalay Circular Railway =

Railway line in Myanmar

Mandalay Circular Railway မန္တလေးမြို့ပတ် ရထားလမ်း
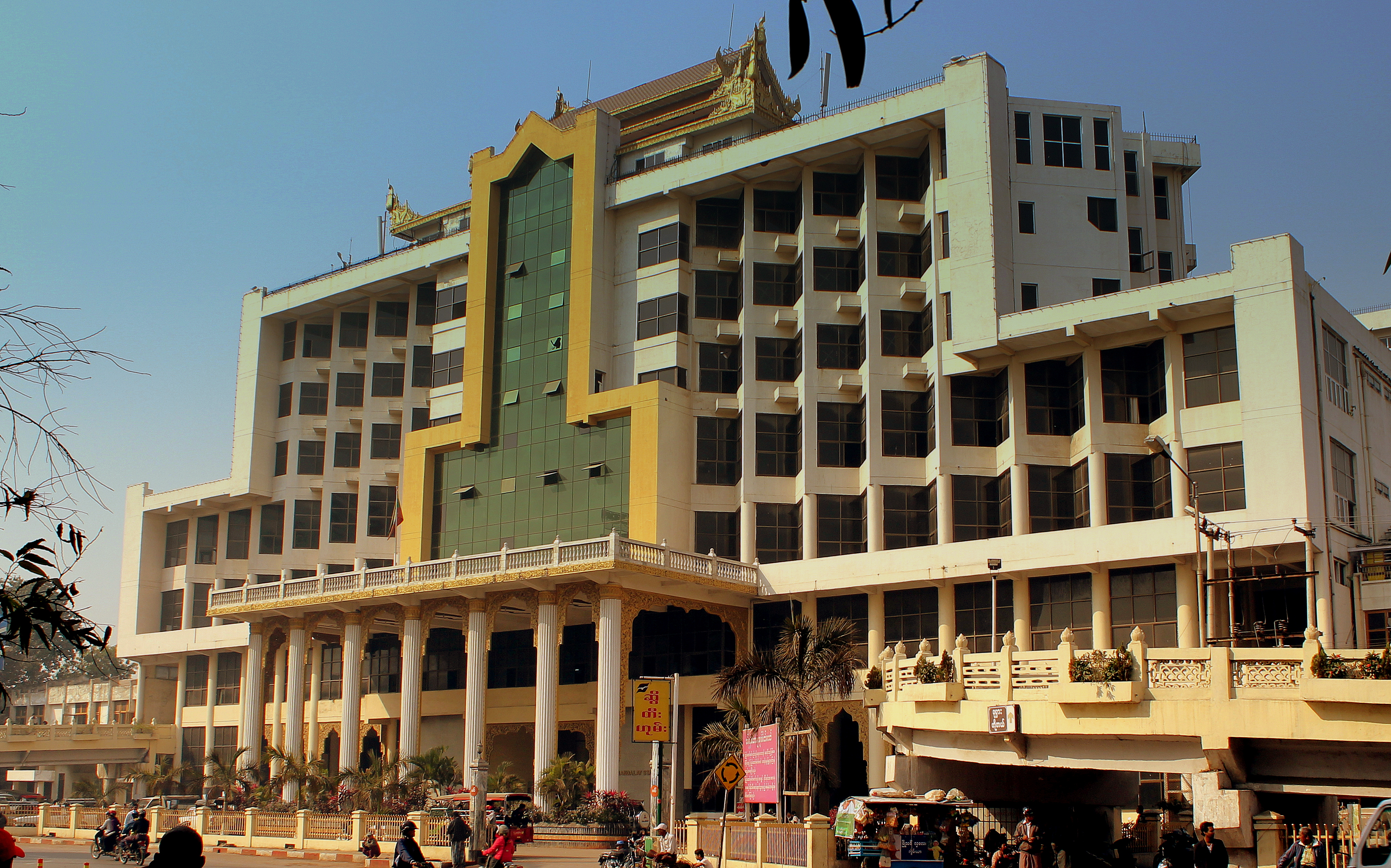
- Mandalay Central Station

- Map of Mandalay Eastern Circular Line

Overview
- Owner: Myanma Railways
- Locale: Mandalay
- Number of stations: 9
- Headquarters: Mandalay

Technical
- System length: 19.32 miles (31.09 km)

Mandalay Circular Railway is part of the Mandalay city railway network operated by Myanma Railways under the Ministry of Transport and Communications. It runs on the Mandalay-Tha Ye Ze line, spanning 19.32 miles. The route, known as the Eastern Circular Line, includes stops at stations such as Shan Su, Myohaung, Thoe Gyan, Kanthaya, Aung Pin Le, Yin Pyan, Obo, and Tha Ye Ze stations.

The service operates as follows:

- Train No. (M-41) departs from Mandalay Station at 7:00 AM and arrives at Tha Ye Ze Station at 9:00 AM.
- Train No. (M-42) departs from Tha Ye Ze Station at 2:00 PM and arrives back at Mandalay Station at 4:00 PM.

The trains stop at Shan Su, Myohaung, Thoe Gyan, Kanthaya, Aung Pin Le, Yin Pyan, Obo, and Tha Ye Ze stations. The fare is 200 kyats per passenger for a one-way trip, and 400 kyats for a round-trip.

== History ==
The circular railway line was initially opened as the Western Circular Line on January 4, 1990. It originally followed a route starting from Mandalay Station, heading 35 miles (56 km) west towards the original timber and oil transport line near the river port, and continuing north along the riverside road. The line then extended from 26th B Street, passing Pyigyunt on 26th B Street, eastward to 86th Street near Shwe Ta Chaung. It then followed the northern section of 86th Street along Shwe Ta Chaung Canal, passing through Re Kyi, Me Oo Tan, Nyaung Pinzeik, Kyankhin, and into Obo Station.

The Eastern Circular Line was later opened on June 2, 1991. Due to low passenger numbers, the Western Circular Line was suspended, and only the Eastern Circular Line remains in operation.

== Stations ==
- (24) Thoe Gyan 385 1/4 (Junction)
- (77) Kanthaya 386
- (78) Aung Pin Le 387 1/4
- (79) Yin Pyan 388 3/4
- (80) Nanshe 389 1/2
- (81) Dawna Bwar 391 1/4
- (82) Nwe Ni 393
- (83) Oh Bo 389 (Junction)
- (84) Tha Ye Ze 387
