= Industrial production in Shōwa Japan =

Development of industry in Japan during the Shōwa era

Industrial production was a defining characteristic of Shōwa Japan. It originated from the country's attempt to be Westernized.

== Overview ==
Industrialization first appeared in the textile industries, especially cotton and silk production, which were based in home workshops in rural areas. By the 1890s, Japanese textiles dominated the home markets and competed successfully with British products in China and India, as well. Japanese shippers were also competing with European traders to carry these goods across Asia and even to Europe. As in the West, the textile mills employed mainly women, half of them under age twenty. They were sent there by their fathers, and they turned over their wages to their fathers. Japan largely skipped water power and moved straight to steam powered mills, which were more productive and created a demand for coal.

1907 saw the greatest number of labor disputes in a decade, with large-scale riots at Japan's two leading copper mines, Ashio and Besshi, which were only suppressed by the use of troops. None of these early unions were large (the metalworkers union had 3,000 members, only 5% of workers employed in the industry), or lasted longer than three or four years, largely due to strong opposition from employers and the government's anti-union policies, notably the Public Order and Police Provisions Law (1900).

Despite this, Japanese citizens were able to advance through the ranks of society more easily due to the abolishment of the feudal system. Citizens were also more educated, with leaders sending thousands of students to the United States and Europe to gain new knowledge. The government also recruited more than 3,000 Westerners to teach modern science, mathematics, technology, and foreign languages in Japan (O-yatoi gaikokujin).

From 1918 to 1921, a wave of major industrial disputes marked the peak of organized labour power. A prolonged economic slump that followed brought cutbacks in employment in heavy industry. By 1928, the GNP of Japan at current prices peaked at ¥16,506 million. In the mid-1930s, the Japanese nominal wage rates were a tenth of those in the United States (based on mid-1930s exchange rates), while the price level is estimated to have been about 44% that of the US.

In the 1930s, the Japanese economy suffered less from the Great Depression than most industrialized nations, its GDP expanding at a rapid rate of 5% per year. Manufacturing and mining came to account for more than 30% of GDP, more than twice the value for the agricultural sector. Most industrial growth, however, was geared toward expanding the nation's military power.

Beginning in 1937 with significant land seizures in China, and to a greater extent after 1941, when annexations and invasions across Southeast Asia and the Pacific created the Greater East Asia Co-Prosperity Sphere, the Japanese government sought to acquire and develop critical natural resources in order to secure economic independence. Among the natural resources that Japan seized and developed were: coal in China, sugarcane in the Philippines, petroleum from the Dutch East Indies and Burma, and tin and bauxite from the Dutch East Indies and Malaya. Japan also purchased the rice production of Thailand, Burma, and Cochinchina. According to a 2020 study, Japan used its imperial power to boost its industrialization.

During the early stages of Japan's expansion, the Japanese economy expanded considerably. Steel production rose from 6,442,000 tons to 8,838,000 tons over the same time period. In 1941 Japanese aircraft industries had the capacity to manufacture 10,000 aircraft per year. Much of this economic expansion benefited the "zaibatsu", large industrial conglomerates.

Over the course of the Pacific War, the economies of Japan and its occupied territories all suffered severely. Inflation was rampant; the Japanese heavy industry, forced to devote nearly all its production to meet military needs, was unable to meet the commercial requirements of Japan (which had previously relied on trade with Western countries for their manufactured goods). Local industries were unable to produce at high enough levels to avoid severe shortfalls. Furthermore, maritime trade, upon which the Empire depended greatly, was sharply curtailed by damage to the Japanese merchant fleet over the course of the war.

By the end of the war, what remained of the Japanese Empire was wracked by shortages, inflation, and currency devaluation. Transport was nearly impossible, and industrial production in Japan's shattered cities ground to a halt. The destruction wrought by the war eventually brought the Japanese economy to a virtual standstill.

== See also ==
- Economic history of Japan
- Economy of the Empire of Japan
- German–Japanese industrial co-operation before and during World War II
