= Burma Mines Railway =

Railway line in Myanmar

The Burma Mines Railway is a 2 ft (610 mm) gauge railway in Myanmar for the transportation of locally mined silver and lead ore to a smelter at Namtu.

The line runs from Namyao, on the Mandalay - Lashio branch of Myanmar Railways, via Namtu to Bawdwin and is 80 kilometres (50 mi) long.

== History ==
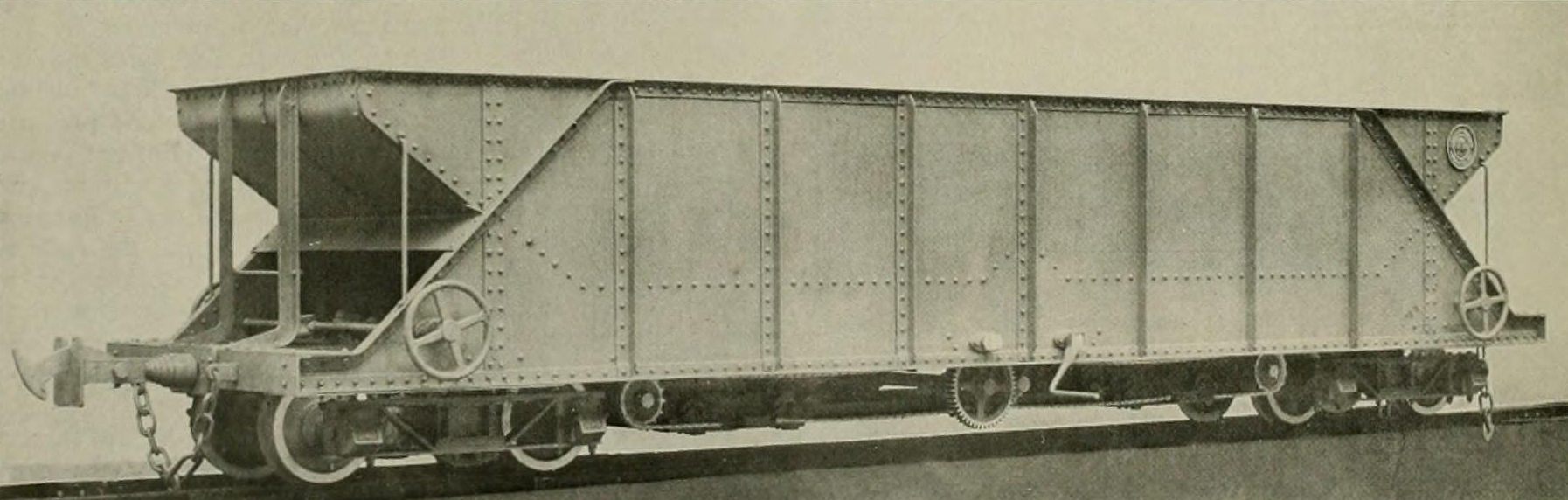
Hopper car built 1917 by Blake Boiler Co., Darlington

The Burma Mines, Railway and Smelting Co Ltd was founded in March 1906 and the construction of the railway started in 1907, to reach the Tiger Camp mining area in 1908, with a 5-kilometre (3.1 mi) extension to the Bawdwin mines and included a Z-reverse at Wallah Gorge, just before Tiger Camp, which was later replaced by a spiral.

The railway's headquarters and workshops were built in Namtu.

In 1914 the connection with the metre gauge Burma Railways was moved from Manpwe to Namyao, a short distance to the east. After the First World War, the local Burma Corporation Ltd took over operations and built an electrified underground railway at Tiger Camp and 100 hopper cars were ordered from the American Pressed Steel Car Company.

In the 1930s the line experienced its peak traffic. Steam was largely replaced in the 1970s and 1980s but today two steam locos remain in working order.

== Present day ==
In present day, the coal for the smelters and the finished products is transported by road. Ore transport from Bawdwin to Namtu is still done by rail. The section from Namyao to Namtu sees little traffic. Namtu is a security area and restrictions are placed on visiting the railway, mines and smelters, except on official tours.
