= Railways of Burma =

Railways of Burma may refer to:

- Burma Railway - a railway connecting Thailand and Burma constructed by the Japanese using POW labor during World War II
- Rail transport in Burma
- History of rail transport in Myanmar
- for Burma Railway Company, an early British era company charged with operating the railways of Burma, see History of rail transport in Myanmar
- for government run railroads see Myanmar Railways
