= Mandalay Central railway station =

Principal railway station serving Mandalay, Myanmar

Mandalay Central မန္တလေး ဘူတာကြီး
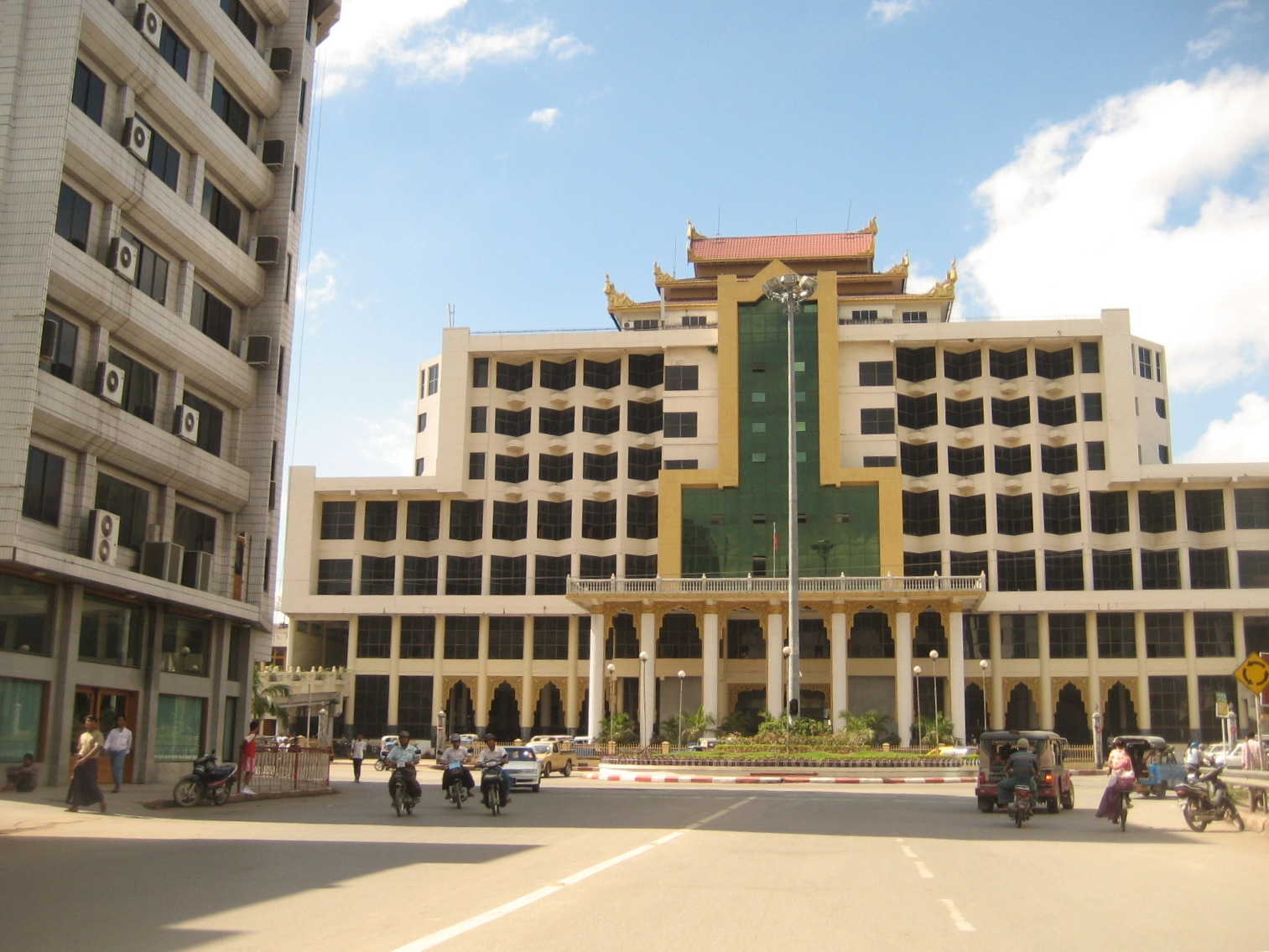
- Mandalay Central railway station

General information
- Location: 78th Road and 30th Road Junction; Chanayethazan, Mandalay; Mandalay Division, Myanmar
- Coordinates: 21°58′37″N 96°5′10″E
- Lines: Yangon–Mandalay Railway; Mandalay–Lashio Railway; Paleik-Tada Oo- Myingyan/Bagan Railway
Location

Mandalay Central railway station (Burmese: မန္တလေး ဘူတာကြီး), located in downtown Mandalay, is one of the largest rail stations in Myanmar. The station is Upper Myanmar's gateway to the 3,126-mile (5,031 km) national rail network. It is the terminus of the main rail line from Yangon and the starting point of branch lines to Pyin U Lwin (Maymyo), Lashio, Monywa, Pakokku, Kalay, Gangaw, to the southwest, Myingyan and Bagan, and to the north, Shwebo, Kawlin, Naba, Kanbalu, Mohnyin, Hopin, Mogaung and Myitkyina.

The station is located in a recently built seven-story complex which includes a hotel. The old station is located to the south of the new station.
