= Agriculture in the Empire of Japan =

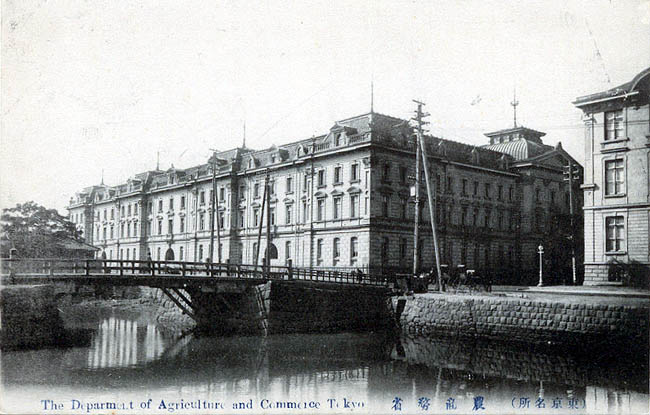
Ministry of Agriculture in Tokyo, pre-1923

Agriculture in Japan was an important component of the pre-war Japanese economy. Although Japan had only 16% of its land area under cultivation before the Pacific War, over 45% of households made a living from farming. Japanese cultivated land was mostly dedicated to rice, which accounted for 15% of world rice production in 1937.

== Historical development ==
=== Meiji period ===
After the end of the Tokugawa shogunate with the Meiji Restoration of 1868, Japanese agriculture was dominated by a tenant farming system. The Meiji government based its industrialization program on tax revenues from private land ownership, and the Land Tax Reform of 1873 increased the process of landlordism, with many farmers having their land confiscated due to inability to pay the new taxes.

This situation was worsened by the deflationary Matsukata Fiscal Policy of 1881–1885, which severely depressed rice prices, leading to further bankruptcies, and even to large scale rural uprisings against the government. By the end of the Meiji period, over 67% of all peasant families were driven into tenancy, and farm productivity stagnated. As tenants were forced to pay over half their crop as rent, they were often forced to send wives and daughters to textile mills or to sell daughters into prostitution to pay for taxes.

In the early Meiji period, landowners collected a high rate of rent in kind, rather than cash and consequently played a major role in the development of agriculture, since the tenant farmers found it difficult to obtain capital. Gradually, with the development of cash crops to supplement the mainstay of rice, and the growth of capitalism in general from the turn of the twentieth century onwards, agricultural cooperatives and the government took over the role by providing farm subsidies, loans, and education in new agricultural techniques.

The first agricultural cooperatives were established in 1900, after their creation was debated in the Diet of Japan by Shinagawa Yajirō and Hirata Tosuke as a means of modernizing Japanese agriculture and adapting it to a cash economy. These cooperatives served in rural areas as credit unions, purchasing cooperatives and assisted in the marketing and sales of farm products.

=== Taishō period ===
The Imperial Agricultural Association (帝国農会, Teikoku Nokai) was a central organization for agricultural cooperatives in the Empire of Japan. It was established in 1910, and provided assistance to individual cooperatives through transmission of agricultural research and facilitating the sales of farm products. The Imperial Agricultural Association was at the peak of a three tier structure of national-prefectural-local system of agricultural.

This organization was of vital importance after nationwide markets were consolidated under government control in the aftermath of the Rice Riots of 1918 and increasing economic crisis from the late 1920s. Increasing tenant farmer disputes and issues with landlordism also led to increasing government regulation.

After the Rice Riots of 1918, many peasants came under the influence of the urban labor movement with socialist, communist and/or agrarian ideas, which created serious political issues. Not only were the Imperial Family of Japan and the zaibatsu major landowners, but until 1928, an income tax requirement severely limited the right to vote, limiting seats in the Diet of Japan only to people of wealth. In 1922, the Nihon Nomin Kumiai (Japan Farmer's Union) was formed for collective bargaining for cultivator rights and reduced rents.

=== Shōwa period ===
By the 1930s, the growth of the urban economy and flight of farmers to the cities gradually weakened the hold of the landlords. The interwar years also saw the rapid introduction of mechanized agriculture, and the supplementation of natural animal fertilizers with chemical fertilizers and imported phosphates.

With the growth of the wartime economy, the government recognized that landlordism was an impediment to increased agricultural productivity, and took steps to increase control over the rural sector through the formation of the Central Agricultural Association (中央農会, Chuo Nokai) in 1943, which was a compulsory organization under the wartime command economy to force the implementation of government farming policies. Another duty of the organization was to secure food supply to local markets and the military. It was dissolved after World War II.

== Farming ==
Farmed land in 1937 was 14,940,000 acres (60,500 km^{2}), which represented 15.8% of the total Japanese surface area, compared with 10,615,000 acres (42,960 km^{2}) or 40% in Ohio, or 12,881,000 acres (52,130 km^{2}) or 21% in England. The proportion of farmed land rose from 11.8% in 1887 to 13.7% in 1902, and 14.4% in 1912 to 15.7% in 1919. This fell to 15.4% in 1929. There were 5,374,897 farmers at an average 2.67 acres (10,800 m^{2}) per family, in comparison with any American farmer family with 155 acres (630,000 m^{2}). These were larger in Hokkaidō and Karafuto and reduced by 2 acres (8,100 m^{2}) in southwest area. The intense culture, fertilizers and scientific development, raised the yield to 43 bushels per acre (2.89 t/ha) in 1936.

In Japan there now is only 6,9% of farmed land.

== Status per geographic region ==
=== Northern territories ===
The sparsely populated Chishima Islands had an inclement climate for anything other than small-scale agriculture; the economy was based the fishing, whaling, and harvest of furs and reindeer meat.

Karafuto likewise had a severe climate made cultivation difficult, along with unsuitable podzolic soils. Small scale farming was developed in the south, where land was suitable for potatoes, oats, rye, forage, and vegetables. Only 7% of Karafuto was arable. The livestock raising was quite important. Farming experiments with rice were partially successful. Through government policies, capable farmers from Hokkaidō and northern Honshū received 12.5 to 25 acres (51,000 to 101,000 m^{2}) of land and a house to settle in Karafuto, and thus the amount of land under cultivation and the Japanese population rose steadily through the 1920s and 1930s. By 1937, 10,811 families were cultivating 86,175 acres (348.74 km^{2}), as opposed to 8,755 families cultivating 179.9 km^{2} in 1926.

=== Hokkaidō ===
Hokkaidō was a target area for agricultural development since the start of the Meiji period, with the establishment of the Hokkaidō colonization Office, and with the assistance of numerous foreign advisors who introduced new crops and new agricultural techniques. Hokkaidō farms averaged 11 acres (45,000 m^{2}), more than four times others in Japan. Despite efforts to cultivate rice on about 60% of the arable land in the territory, climate and soils were not favorable and yields were low. Other crops included oats, potatoes, vegetables, rye and wheat as well as extensive horticulture. The dairy industry was important, as was the raising of horses for use by the Imperial Japanese Army cavalry.

Farmer households numbered 2,000,000 and the government mentioned the possibility to establish another 1,000,000.

=== Honshū ===
The farms were 3.5 to 4 acres (14,000 to 16,000 m^{2}), for rice, potatoes, and rye. Northern Honshū produced 75% of apples of Japan; other products included cherries and horses. Central Honshū cultivated rice and special products including white mulberry (for silkworms) in Suwa, tea, (in Shizuoka), daikon in Aichi, and also rye, rice, grapes for wine, etc.

=== Shikoku & Kyūshū ===
Due to subtropical conditions, Shikoku and Kyūshū islands were dominated by traditional rice and sweet potato crops. Other important crops included sugar cane, bananas, Japanese citrus, tobacco, taro, and beans. Other products obtained in the highlands included rye, wheat, morel, silk and livestock raising (horses and cows).

=== Ryūkyūs ===
The tropical Ryūkyū Islands with their limited cultivatable area had a largely subsistence agriculture based on rice, sweet potatoes, sugar cane and fruits.

=== Taiwan ===
With a large ethnic Chinese population, agricultural methods and products in Taiwan were in the Chinese-style, with rice cultivation and sweet potatoes dominating. Cash crops included fruits and tea and jute & ramie. (The cultivated land was 2,116,174 acres (8,563.85 km^{2}) at a density of 1,576 inhabitants per square mile in 1937.

The central government gave strong emphasis on development of the sugar cane industry, and Taiwan satisfied 42% of the crude sugar demand of Japan. The consumption of sugar in Japan grew from 15 pounds (6.8 kg) in 1918 to 30 pounds (14 kg) in 1928.

The central government also placed strong emphasis on the development of forestry products. Camphor wood was collected from forests or plantations under a government-monopoly (the "Formosa Manufacturing Company" from 1899).

=== South Seas Mandate ===
The equatorial tropical conditions of the South Seas Mandate islands supported farming of coconuts, taro, sweet potatoes, tapioca, bananas, pineapples and rice, for local use and export. The sugar cane industry was given strong emphasis by the central government, with principal sugar in Saipan and Palau. However, the very limited cultivable land area of the South Seas Mandate meant that fishing and whaling remained more economically important.

=== Philippines ===
Prior to the Pacific War there was a small Japanese settlement in Davao at the south of Mindanao Island which worked with Japanese private companies to cultivate abacá for Manila hemp. This was the main center of cultivation in the region, with farming of sugar cane, pineapple, bananas, sweet potato and other tropical crops. Abaca farming exceeded sugar cane cultivation in area but not in value. 25% was sent to the USA. Sisal was also exported to the US and Japan.

== See also ==
- Foreign commerce and shipping of the Empire of Japan
