= Namtu =

Namtu ၼမ်ႉတူႈ
- Town
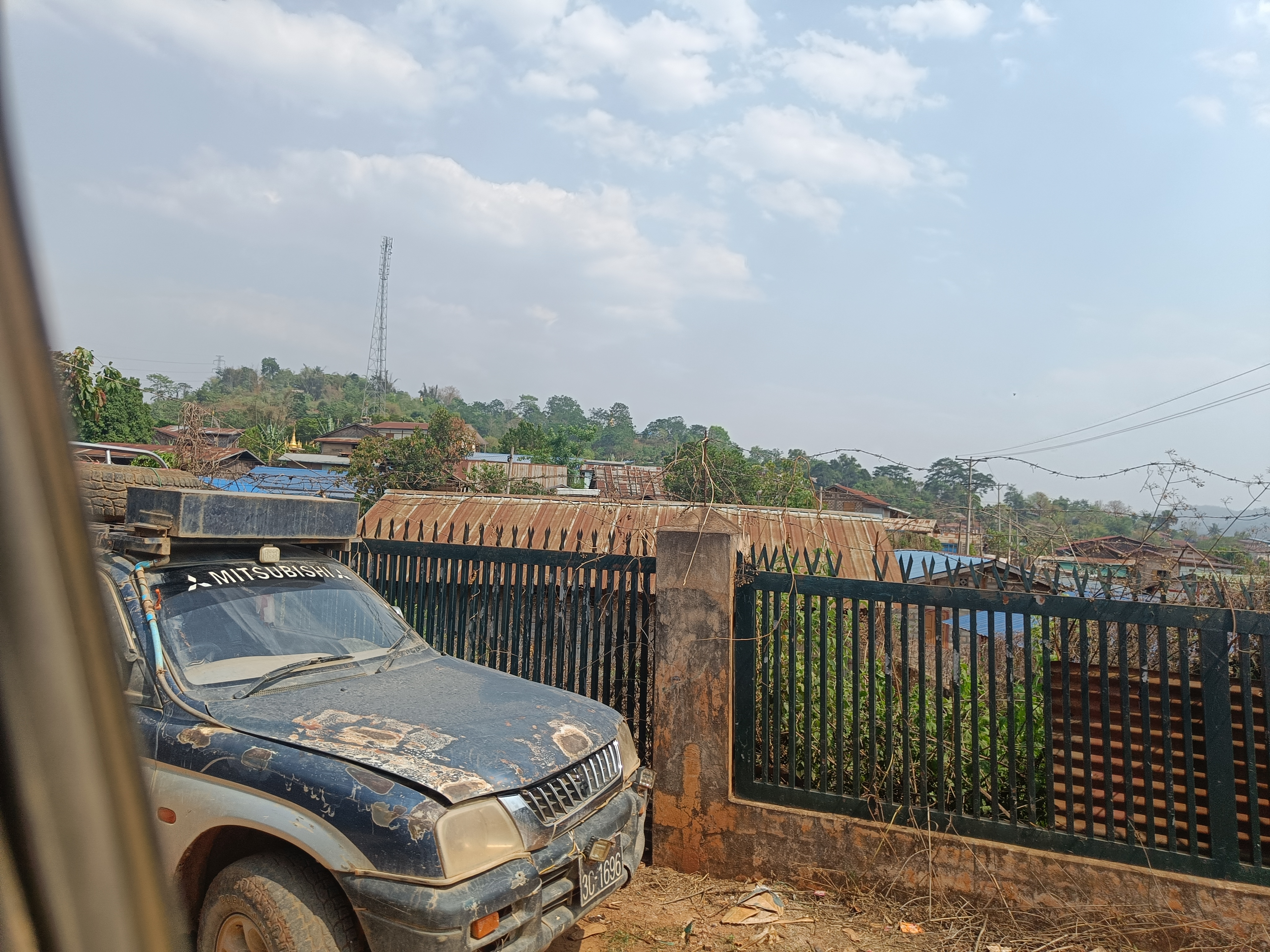

- Location in Myanmar
- Coordinates: 23°5′33″N 97°24′4″E
- Country: Myanmar
- State: Shan State
- District: Kyaukme District
- Township: Namtu Township
- Control: Ta'ang National Liberation Army

Population (2005)
  - Ethnicities: Shan Palaung Indian Gurkha Muslim
  - Religions: Buddhism
- Time zone: UTC+6.30 (MMT)

Namtu (Shan: ၼမ်ႉတူႈ) is a town situated in northern Shan State, Myanmar. It is famous for Bawdwin and Namtu silver mines. NamTu River is flowing across in the middle of town and the transportation from Namtu to Lashio or Namtu to Mandalay is by bus.

== History ==
The Namtu Bawdwin Mines were the world's largest source of lead, and one of the world's largest sources of silver before the Second World War. Before the British arrived in the 1880s, the Saopha of Tawngpeng controlled the mines at Namtu, although the mining work was undertaken not by the Palaung but by the Chinese from Yunnan Province across the border. The mines fell into disuse when the lode was followed to the ground water level. They were revived by the British and the largest mines were operated by the Burma Corporation at the beginning of the 20th century. Today the Namtu mines are under state control, known as No 1 Mining Enterprise and run by the Ministry of Mines.

Lead, zinc and nickel are also produced by the mines. Zinc was bought mainly by Japan, and the other minerals sent to Namtu for smelting before being marketed abroad.

In February 1998, 3,000 workers went on strike for better working conditions and increase in wages for underground miners.

A Chinese company won the contract in 2002 for the construction of a zinc oxide plant at Namtu, processing 50,000 tonnes of zinc slag annually and the zinc oxide to be exported to a smelter in Yunnan.

The Ta’ang National Liberation Army (TNLA) captured the town from the State Administration Council (SAC) on 28 December 2023 following a fight that lasted 4 days.

== Geology ==
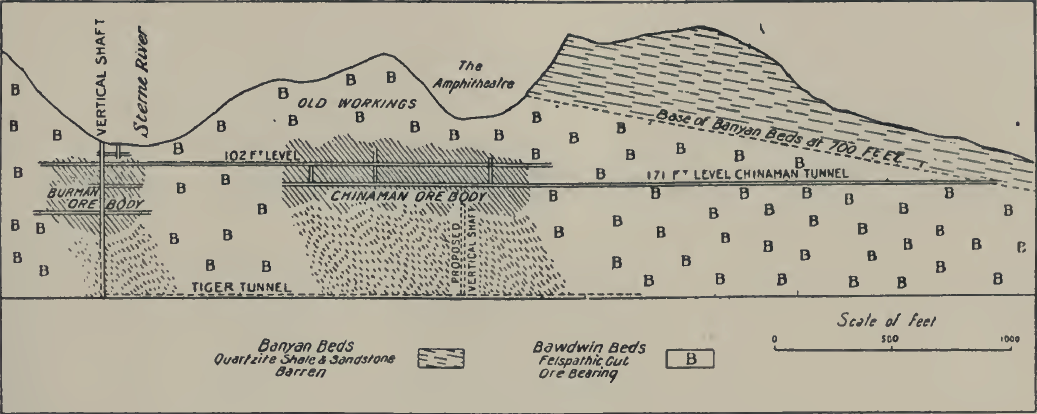
Namtu Bawdin mine cross section

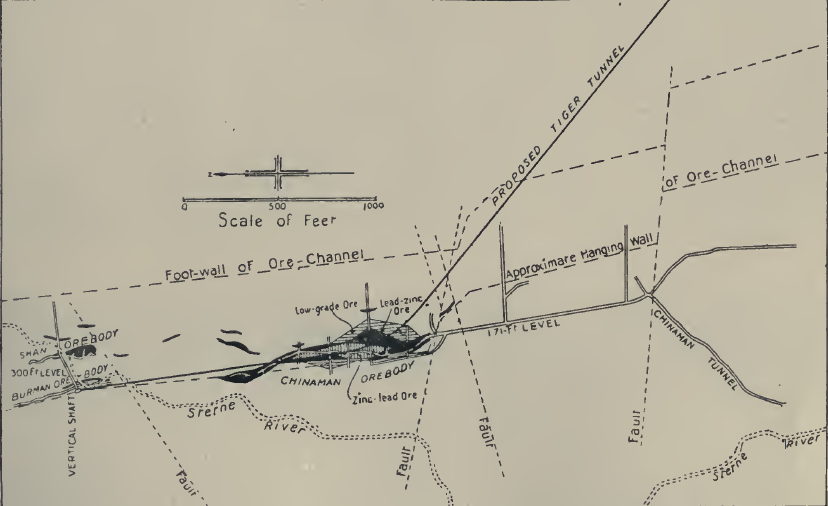
Namtu Bawdin mine map

In 1904, Herbert Hoover, representing Bewick, Moreing and Company, visited the mines upon the urging of A.C. Martin. Martin was building the railway from Mandalay to Lashio and owned the lease. Hoover arranged capital to develop the mines and agreed to invest some of his own savings in what he called "the largest chance of my life." The capital was also used to link the mines via rail to the main line and erect a smelter in Mandalay to melt the slags. The initial promise of financial return from the abandoned copper-lead mine was in the enormous lead left behind in the surface slag. The mines had been worked by the Chinese from 1400 until 1850, mainly for silver. However, after separating the silver via cupellation, the lead was left behind. The Chinese left "hundreds of dumps and tunnels, extending over nearly three miles." One open was a thousand feet long, five hundred feet wide, and three hundred feet deep. Lead production began in 1908, the same year Hoover became managing director of Burma Mines. The "Chinaman Tunnel" was completed in 1910. Hoover became chairman of the board in 1914. The two mile long "Tiger Tunnel" gained access to "one of the largest and richest lead-zinc-silver ore bodies ever discovered." Production of that ore started in 1916 after the construction of mills and hydroelectric plants.

In 1911, the smelter was moved to Namtu and monthly lead production was 1000 tons and 22,000 ounces of silver. Total production from 1909 through Oct. 1915 was 66,000 tons of lead and 1,432,000 ounces of silver from 158,000 tons of slag and 35,000 tons of ore.

In 2018, ASX listed Myanmar Metals bought out a majority 51% participating interest in the Bawdwin Project in joint venture with its two local project partners, Win Myint Mo Industries Co. Ltd. (WMM) and EAP Global Co. Ltd. (EAP) who each hold 25% of the Bawdwin mine. PFS done in 2019 resulted in Phase 1 of mining operations at Bawdwin, a 13 year Starter Pit, will set Bawdwin up to be a world leading producer of lead and silver as well as a significant zinc producer. In steady state production, Bawdwin’s Starter Pit would be the 3rd largest-producing lead mine in the world, the 10th largest-producing silver mine in the world, as well as being a globally significant zinc producer.

Updated resource estimates on 8 August 2019 returned indicated and Inferred Mineral Resource estimate rises to 100.6Mt at 4.0% Pb, 3.1 Oz/t (97 g/t) Ag, 1.9% Zn and 0.2% Cu.

== Politics ==
The Shan State Army (SSA-North)'s Third Brigade has been active in Mongmit, Kyaukme, Hsipaw, Namtu and Lashio. It reached a cease-fire agreement with the Burmese military government (SLORC) in 1989, and its activities have been severely curtailed. The Palaung State Liberation Organization, also active in the region and another one of the cease-fire groups, announced a ban on the cultivation of the opium poppy in the area under their control. They had alleged that the Burmese military was levying a tax on the poppy farmers.
