= Lashio Railway Station =

Train station in Shan State, Myanmar

Lashio station လားရှိုးဘူတာ
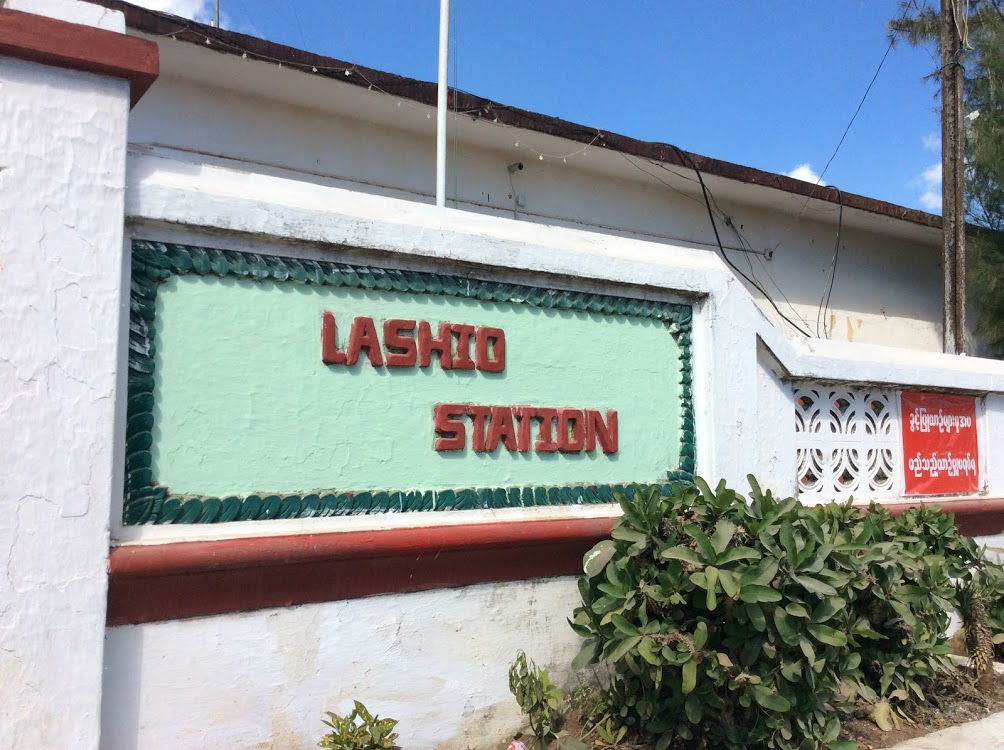
- Lashio railway station

General information
- Location: Lashio, Shan State, Myanmar
- Coordinates: 22°58′24″N 97°43′53″E
- Line: Mandalay–Lashio Railway

History
- Opened: 1903
Location

Lashio station (Burmese: လားရှိုးဘူတာ) is a railway station located in Lashio, Shan State, Myanmar. This station was opened in 1903 as the terminus of the Mandalay–Lashio Railway. As of 2023, there are plans to extend the route to Muse near the Chinese border. On 29 July 2024 the station was captured by the Myanmar National Democratic Alliance Army.
