= Yokoi =

Yokoi is Japanese surname. Notable people with the surname include:

- Gunpei Yokoi, designer of the Game Boy and other Nintendo products
- Hirotaka Yokoi, professional mixed martial arts fighter
- Lilly Yokoi (1929–2026), Japanese American bicycle acrobat
- Mitsuo Yokoi, a Japanese voice actor (known as "Tesshō Genda")
- Shoichi Yokoi, soldier and celebrity
- Yokoi Shōnan, political reformer
- Yokoi Yayū, 18th-century poet
