= Bawdwin Mine =

Historic mine in Myanmar

Coordinates: 23°06′36″N 97°17′49″E

Bawdwin Mine (Burmese: ဘော်တွင်းသတ္တုတွင်း) is a historical mine in northeast Myanmar (formerly Burma) which was one of the largest mines controlled by the British Empire before World War II. It was first mined by the Chinese in the 15th century.

== Early history ==
The Bawdwin Mine, known locally as Bawdwingyi, is situated nearby Lashio in the northern Shan State's Namtu Township, in Myanmar (formerly Upper Burma).

Chinese miners have been extracting minerals from the deposit as early as 1412 A.D. Within 40 miles of the Chinese border, Bawdwin was formerly a Chinese colony, with a population of 20,000. During these early mining activities, only silver was extracted and the lead was left behind. The mine was operated by the Chinese until 1868, when it was abandoned as a result of the Mohammedan rebellion in Yunnan. Their exploitation in the mine's depths was not significantly pursued until British and American engineers began work in the twentieth century. In the early 1900s, Herbert Hoover of the Burma Corporation managed the site as a mining consultant. In 1906, an operational company under the British-owned Burma Corporation, Burma Mines Ltd., acquired the controlling interests in the mine.

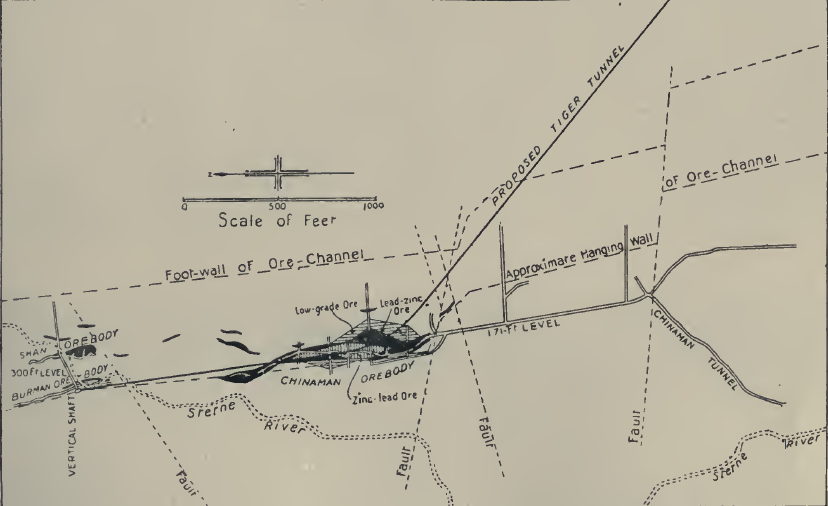
Map of Bawdwin Mine

One of Myanmar's richest natural resources, the polymetallic mine yields silver, lead, zinc, copper and other metals. One of the largest high-grade silver-lead-zinc ore bodies in the world called the "Chinaman Lode" was discovered on the site in 1913. At the Bawdwin Mine, there were two separate sections: the Shan part to the north and the "Chinaman," which contained the Chinaman lode.

== World War II ==
In 1945, the Bawdwin Mine was captured by Chinese troops under the American command of Lieutenant General Daniel Isom Sultan. The site was rebuilt in 1951 following its destruction during World War II, and it was nationalized in 1963.

== See also ==
- Burma Mines Railway
