= Goteik viaduct =

Railway trestle in Shan State, Myanmar

Goteik viaduct ဂုတ်ထိပ်တံတား
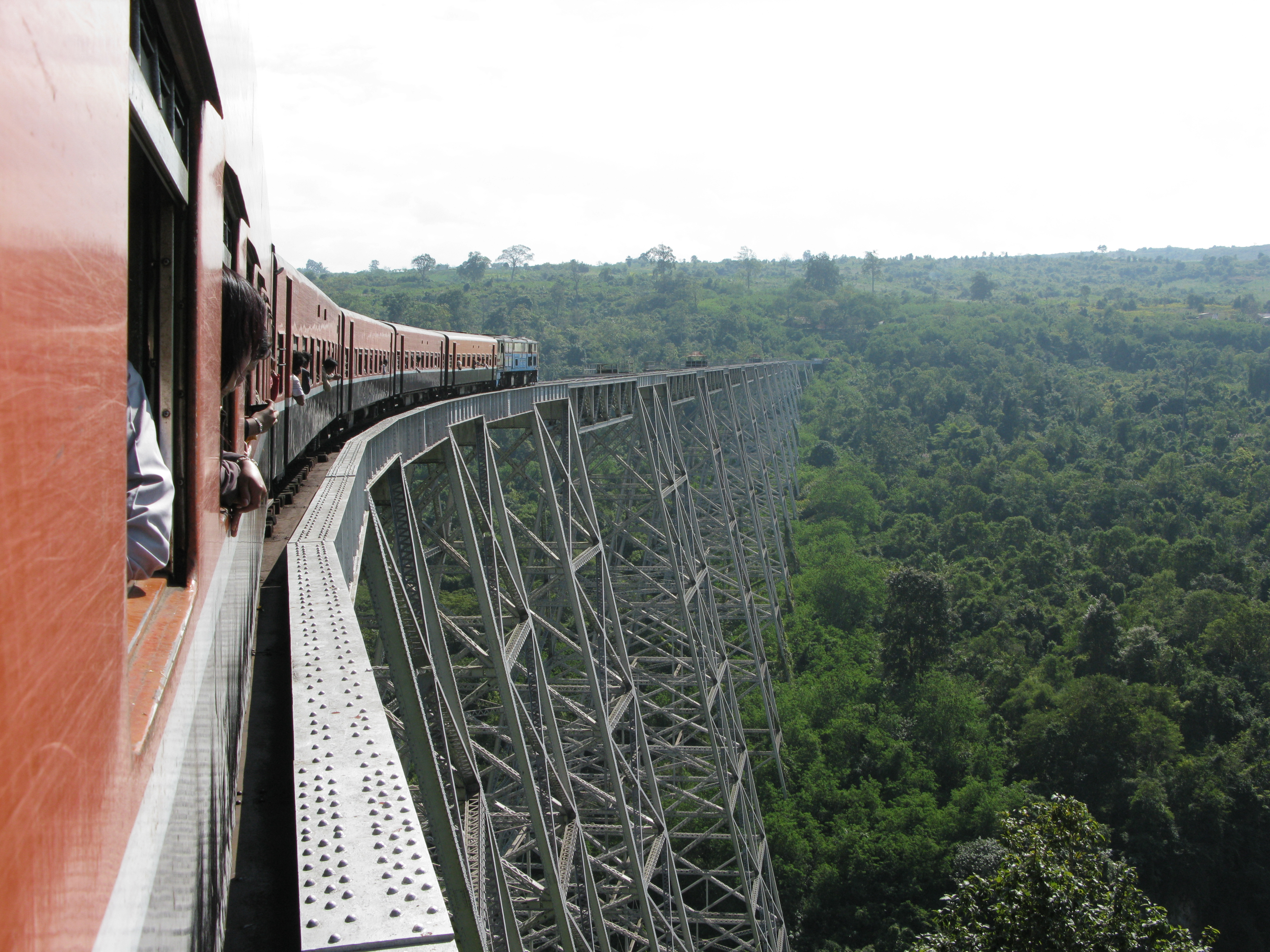
- Coordinates: 22°20′35″N 96°51′35″E
- Carried: 1 rail track
- Crossed: Gohtwin Stream
- Locale: Nawnghkio, between Lashio and Pyin Oo Lwin
- Official name: Goteik viaduct
- Other name: Gohteik viaduct
- Maintained by: Ministry of Rail Transportation

Characteristics
- Design: Trestle
- Total length: 689 metres (2,260 ft)
- Width: single rail track

History
- Construction start: 28 April 1899
- Construction end: 1 January 1900
- Opened: 1 January 1900
- Destroyed: 24 August 2025

Statistics
- Daily traffic: Two trains daily. Mandalay to Lashio and Lashio to Mandalay.
- Toll: USD 4,00/ MMK 3950

Location
- Interactive map of Goteik viaduct ဂုတ်ထိပ်တံတား

The Goteik viaduct (Burmese: ဂုတ်ထိပ်တံတား, MLCTS: gu.hti.ta.aa., also known as Gohteik viaduct or Gok Hteik viaduct) was a railway trestle over the Goteik Gorge of the Myitnge River in western Shan State, Myanmar (also known as Burma). The bridge was between the two towns of Nawnghkio and Gokhteik, and it was part of the railways between Pyin Oo Lwin, the summer capital of the former British colonial administrators of Burma, and Lashio, the principal town of northern Shan State. It was the highest bridge in Myanmar and when it was completed, the largest railway trestle in the world. It was located approximately 100 km northeast of Mandalay.

The bridge was constructed in 1899 by the Pennsylvania and Maryland Bridge Construction Company, and opened in 1900. The components were made by the Pennsylvania Steel Company and were shipped from the United States. The rail line was constructed to help expand the influence of the British Empire in the region. The construction project was overseen by Sir Arthur Rendel, engineer for the Burma Railway Company.

On 24 August 2025, the Burmese military junta declared that the Goteik Viaduct had been destroyed by rebels in the ongoing Myanmar civil war. The junta blamed the Ta'ang National Liberation Army for the attack. The TNLA denied responsibility and claimed the military bombed the viaduct. The northern part of the 60 feet long beam of the bridge that was fitted between the retaining wall (AB 2) and the pier number (P 16), as well as the retaining wall itself was destroyed.

== Bridge data ==
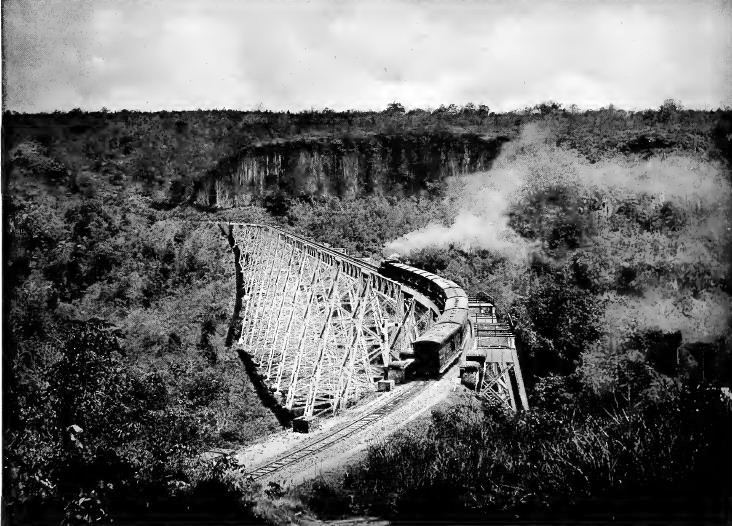
Gokteik viaduct in 1899 or 1900

The viaduct measures 689 metres (2,260 ft) from end to end, and includes 15 towers which span 12 metres (39 ft), along with a double tower 24 metres (79 ft) long. The 15 towers support 10 deck truss spans of 37 metres (121 ft) along with six plate girder spans 18 metres (59 ft) long, and an approach span of 12 metres (39 ft). Many sources have put the height of the bridge at 250 metres (820 ft). That is supposedly a measurement of the river level as it flows underground through a tunnel at the point where it passes underneath the trestle. The true height of the bridge, as measured from the rail deck to the ground on the downstream side of the tallest tower, is 102 metres (335 ft). The cost of construction was £111,200.

== Diversion ==
Because the line from Mandalay to Lashio is considered to be of strategic value, a diversionary route to the valley floor, featuring spectacular horseshoe curves, was built in 1976–1978, to keep trains running even if the Goteik viaduct was sabotaged. Those tracks were still visible from the viaduct in 2013, but the diversionary line has been left to the tropical vegetation since 2002.

== Mention ==
The bridge is mentioned in Paul Theroux's acclaimed travelogue The Great Railway Bazaar. He described the viaduct as "a monster of silver geometry in all the ragged rock and jungle, its presence was bizarre".

== See also ==
- Rail transport in Myanmar
