= Lashio =

Lashio ဝဵင်းလႃႈသဵဝ်ႈ လားရှိုးတိုင်း
- City
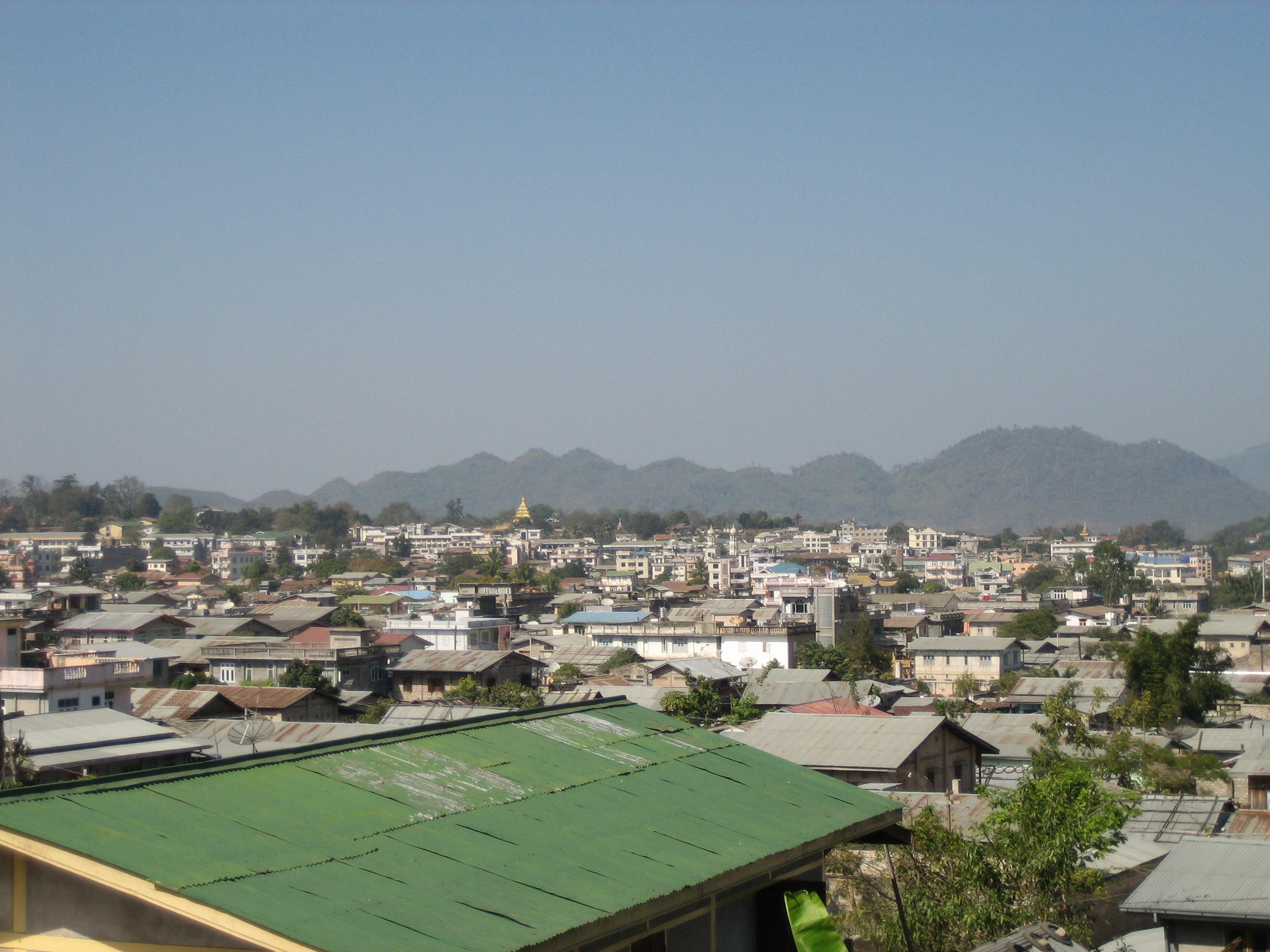

- Map of Lashio

- Location in Myanmar (Burma)
- Coordinates: 22°56′N 97°45′E
- Country: Myanmar
- State: Shan State
- District: Lashio District
- Township: Lashio Township
- Establishment of Lashio: c. 1700s CE
- Elevation: 2,743 ft (836 m)

Population (2009 estimate)
  - Total: 131,000
  - Ethnicities: Shan Chinese Bamars
  - Religions: Buddhism
- Demonym: Lashioan
- Time zone: UTC+6.30 (MMT)

Lashio (Burmese: လားရှိုးမြို့, MLCTS: la: hrui: mrui. [láʃó mjo̰]; Shan: ဝဵင်းလႃႈသဵဝ်ႈ [weŋ˥ laː˧˧˨ sʰeu˧˧˨]) is the largest city and the capital of northern Shan State, Myanmar, about 200 kilometres (120 mi) north-east of Mandalay. It is situated on a low mountain spur overlooking the valley of the Yaw River. Loi Leng, the highest mountain of the Shan Hills, is located 45 km (28 mi) to the south-east of Lashio.

Lashio is the administrative center of Lashio Township and Lashio District; before April 2010, it was also the administrative center of Shan State (North). The population grew from approximately 5000 in 1960 to 88,590 in 1983. It was estimated at approximately 131,000 in 2009. The city was captured by rebel forces in early August 2024 before being retaken by the State Administration Council in April 2025 following a major earthquake which impacted much of Myanmar.

The population is made up of mostly Shan, Chinese and Bamars.

== History ==
The British colonial period in this part of the country began in 1887, and the Myanmar Railways line from Mandalay reached Lashio in 1903.

Before British rule Lashio was also the centre of authority for the northern Shan States, but the Burmese post in the valley was close to the Nam Yao, in an old Chinese fortified camp. The Lashio valley was formerly very populous; but a rebellion, started by the sawbwa of Hsenwi, about ten years before the British occupation, ruined it.

In 1900, the town of Lashio consisted of the European station, with court house and quarters for the civil officers; the military police post, the headquarters of the Lashio battalion of military police; and the native station, in which the various nationalities, Shans, Burmans, Hindus and Muslims, who were divided into separate quarters, with reserves for government servants and for the temporary residences of the five sawbwas of the northern Shan States; and a bazaar.

Lashio became important during the Second Sino-Japanese War (1937–1945) and the Burma campaign of World War II (1941–1945) as the Burmese terminus of the Burma Road. In World War II, Lashio was taken by the Japanese on April 29, 1942 and liberated by the Allies on March 7, 1945.

=== Myanmar civil war ===
During Operation 1027 of the Myanmar Civil War, the town was surrounded by the Ta'ang National Liberation Army and other rebel forces who took towns around Lashio, although fighting did not immediately take place in the town itself. Many people displaced from fighting elsewhere fled to Laisho for safety. After the ceasefire that ended the operation collapsed, the Myanmar National Democratic Alliance Army (MNDAA) and its allies launched a renewed attack to seize the town, culminating in the Battle of Lashio, where rebel forces were victorious. On 20 January 2025, the MNDAA and the junta agreed to a Chinese-brokered ceasefire, with several sources claiming that a withdraw of the former from Lashio was a condition for the deal. However, neither the junta nor the MNDAA has revealed any details of the deal.

On 18 April 2025, SAC-appointed officials, Myanmar Police Force officers, and other civil servants began arriving in Lashio city itself as the MNDAA withdrew. The officials reinstated the SAC administration by 21 April.

== Climate ==
Lashio has a humid subtropical climate (Cwa) according to the Köppen climate classification system, though closely bordering the tropical wet and dry climate (Aw), marked by heavy rains from May to October. The annual rainfall averages 54 inches (1,400 mm). The average maximum temperature is 27 °C (81 °F) and the average minimum 13 °C (55 °F) . Temperatures are generally warm throughout the year, though nights are cool from December to March.

Climate data for Lashio, elevation 747 m (2,451 ft), (1991–2020)
Month	Jan	Feb	Mar	Apr	May	Jun	Jul	Aug	Sep	Oct	Nov	Dec	Year
Record high °C (°F)	38.9 (102.0)	33.5 (92.3)	36.5 (97.7)	38.0 (100.4)	38.1 (100.6)	37.0 (98.6)	34.6 (94.3)	36.0 (96.8)	35.6 (96.1)	34.4 (93.9)	32.4 (90.3)	30.5 (86.9)	38.9 (102.0)
Mean daily maximum °C (°F)	25.8 (78.4)	28.3 (82.9)	31.5 (88.7)	33.0 (91.4)	31.7 (89.1)	30.7 (87.3)	29.5 (85.1)	29.8 (85.6)	30.2 (86.4)	29.4 (84.9)	27.6 (81.7)	25.5 (77.9)	29.4 (84.9)
Daily mean °C (°F)	15.8 (60.4)	17.5 (63.5)	21.0 (69.8)	24.3 (75.7)	25.6 (78.1)	26.3 (79.3)	25.8 (78.4)	25.9 (78.6)	25.6 (78.1)	24.1 (75.4)	20.6 (69.1)	17.1 (62.8)	22.5 (72.5)
Mean daily minimum °C (°F)	5.9 (42.6)	6.7 (44.1)	10.5 (50.9)	15.6 (60.1)	19.5 (67.1)	21.9 (71.4)	22.1 (71.8)	21.9 (71.4)	21.1 (70.0)	18.9 (66.0)	13.6 (56.5)	8.8 (47.8)	15.5 (59.9)
Record low °C (°F)	−1.9 (28.6)	1.0 (33.8)	3.0 (37.4)	8.0 (46.4)	12.5 (54.5)	18.4 (65.1)	20.1 (68.2)	20.0 (68.0)	16.9 (62.4)	8.3 (46.9)	6.0 (42.8)	0.8 (33.4)	−1.9 (28.6)
Average precipitation mm (inches)	11.9 (0.47)	6.4 (0.25)	13.5 (0.53)	51.3 (2.02)	137.8 (5.43)	184.1 (7.25)	242.5 (9.55)	237.9 (9.37)	191.3 (7.53)	132.5 (5.22)	43.7 (1.72)	10.2 (0.40)	1,263.2 (49.73)
Average precipitation days (≥ 1.0 mm)	1.5	0.9	2.3	7.4	13.5	15.7	19.3	19.7	14.1	11.0	3.4	1.4	110.3
Source 1: World Meteorological Organization
Source 2: Norwegian Meteorological Institute (extremes)

== Landmarks ==
- Yan Tine Aung Pagoda
- Chinese Temple
- Natural Hot spring
- Sarsana Hill
- Mansu Shan Monastery
- Lashio Night Bazaar
- Hu Mon Dam
- Linnoet (bat) cave
- Ye Kan Thaung

== Transport ==
Lashio is located at the end of the Burma Road. Lashio Railway Station is the terminus of the Mandalay–Lashio Railway. It is also the end point of the government cart road from Mandalay, from which it is 178 miles (286 km) distant.

The scenic Goteik viaduct is near Lashio and trains travelling from Mandalay pass over the bridge, which is the highest bridge in Myanmar.

In 2009, a railway link through to Jiegao in China was proposed. In 2011 the proposal was expanded to a link between Kunming and Kyaukphyu. President Thein Sein's signed a memorandum of understanding during his May 2011 visit to Beijing between Myanmar's rail transport ministry and China's state-owned Railway Engineering Corporation to build the railway.

It is the home of Lashio Airport.

== Culture ==
Religious sites include the "Sasana (Pyilon Chanta) Pagoda" and the "Mansu Pagoda". Yepusan spa is nearly five miles away from the city center, and is healthful in winter. Other than some ethnic minorities group, Lashio is also a town with a large Chinese population. The most famous Chinese temple in the area is "观音山灵峰寺" where many Chinese people visited during the Chinese New Year (Spring Festival). Since 2000, Lashio has been important for border trade between Myanmar and China.. It is 190 kilometres (120 mi) from Muse, and is situated midway between Muse and Mandalay.

Sai Mauk Kham, one of the Vice Presidents of Myanmar's democratic government from the 2010 general election, was elected from Lashio constituency.

== Education ==
The town is home to the Lashio University, the Computer University (Lashio), the Technology University (Lashio), the Education College (Lashio) and the Lashio Nursing School.

== Gallery ==
Lashio

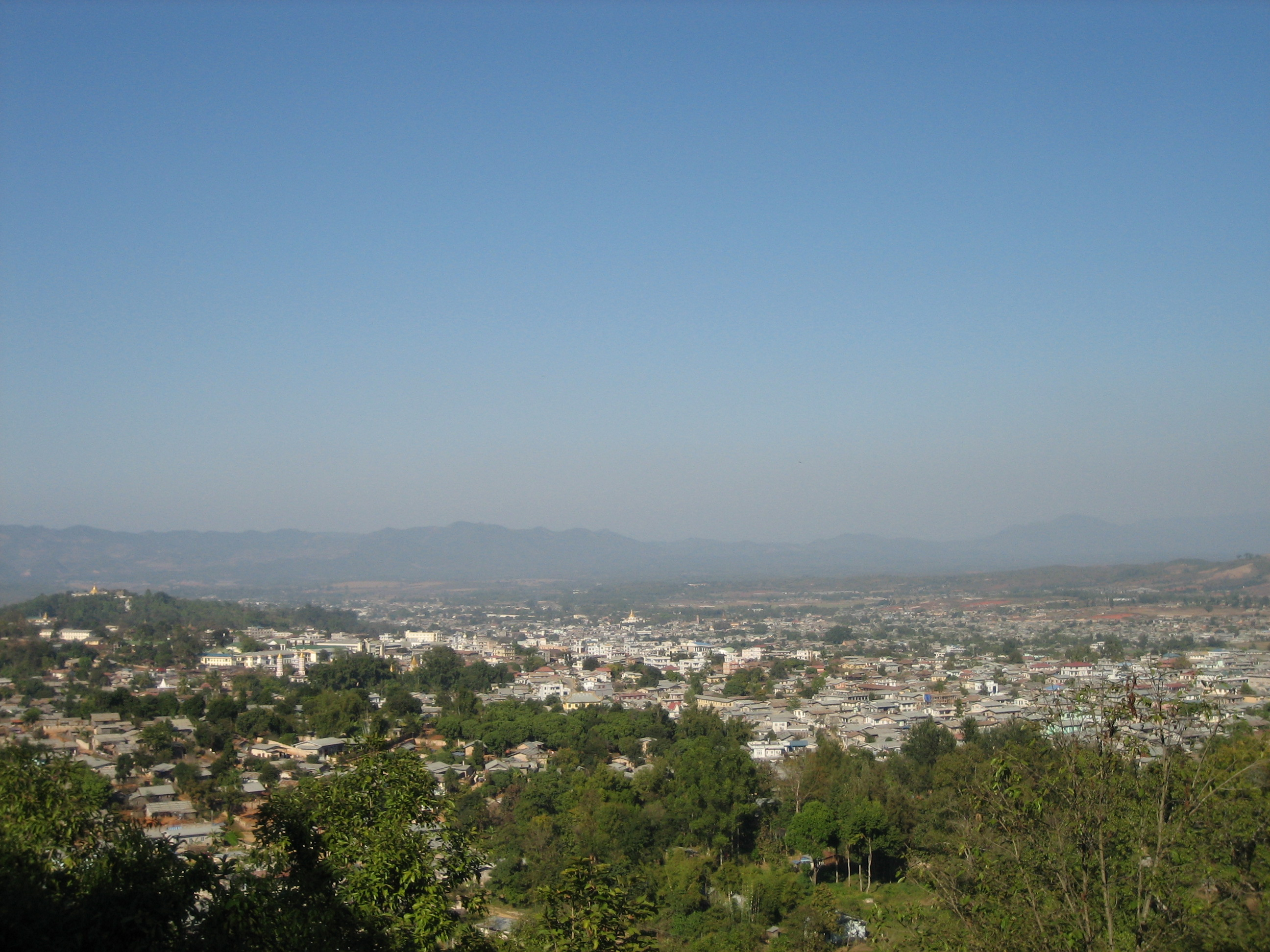
Lashio skyline

Guanyin Temple (臘戌觀音寺)

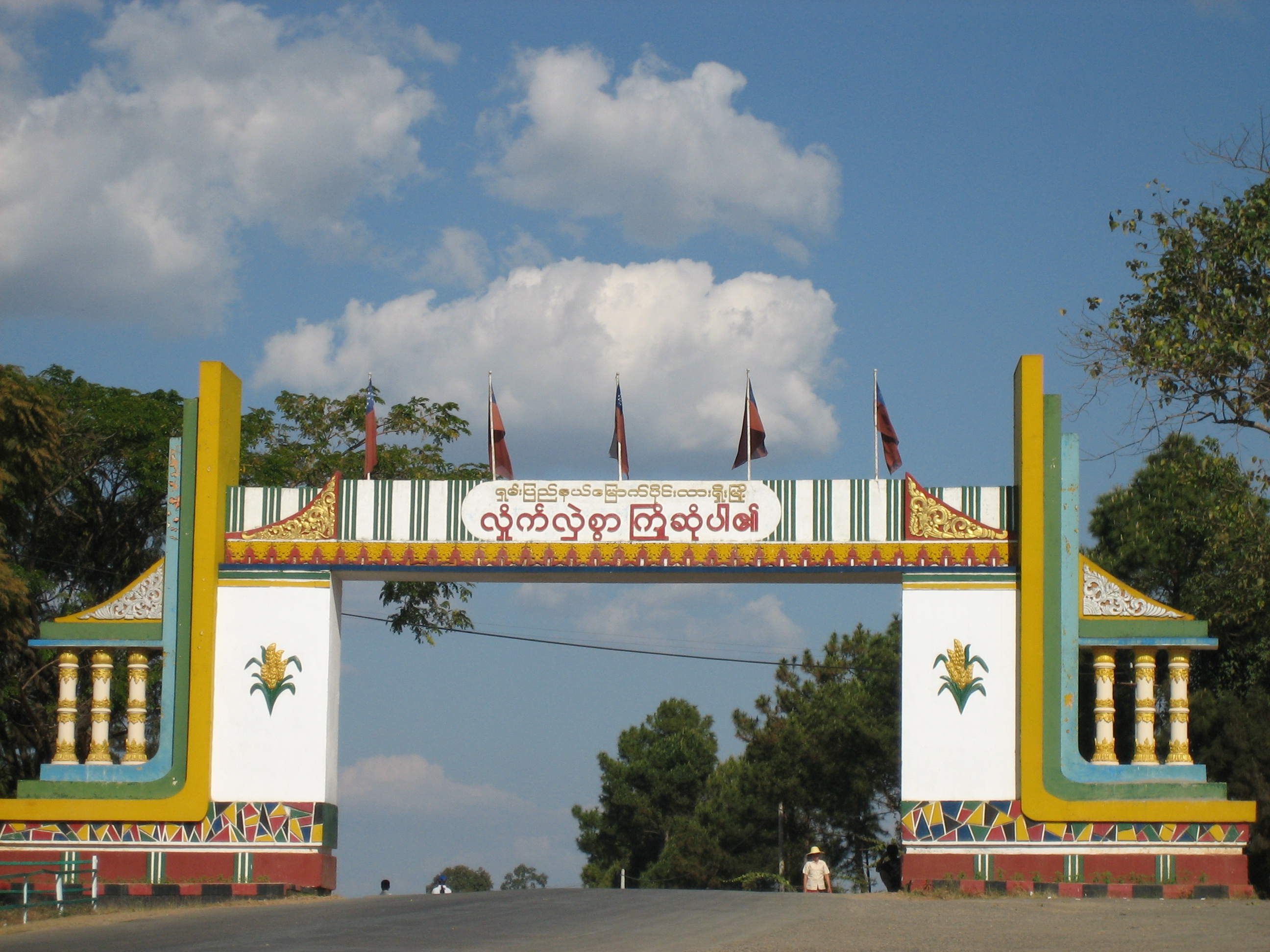
Lashio Gate

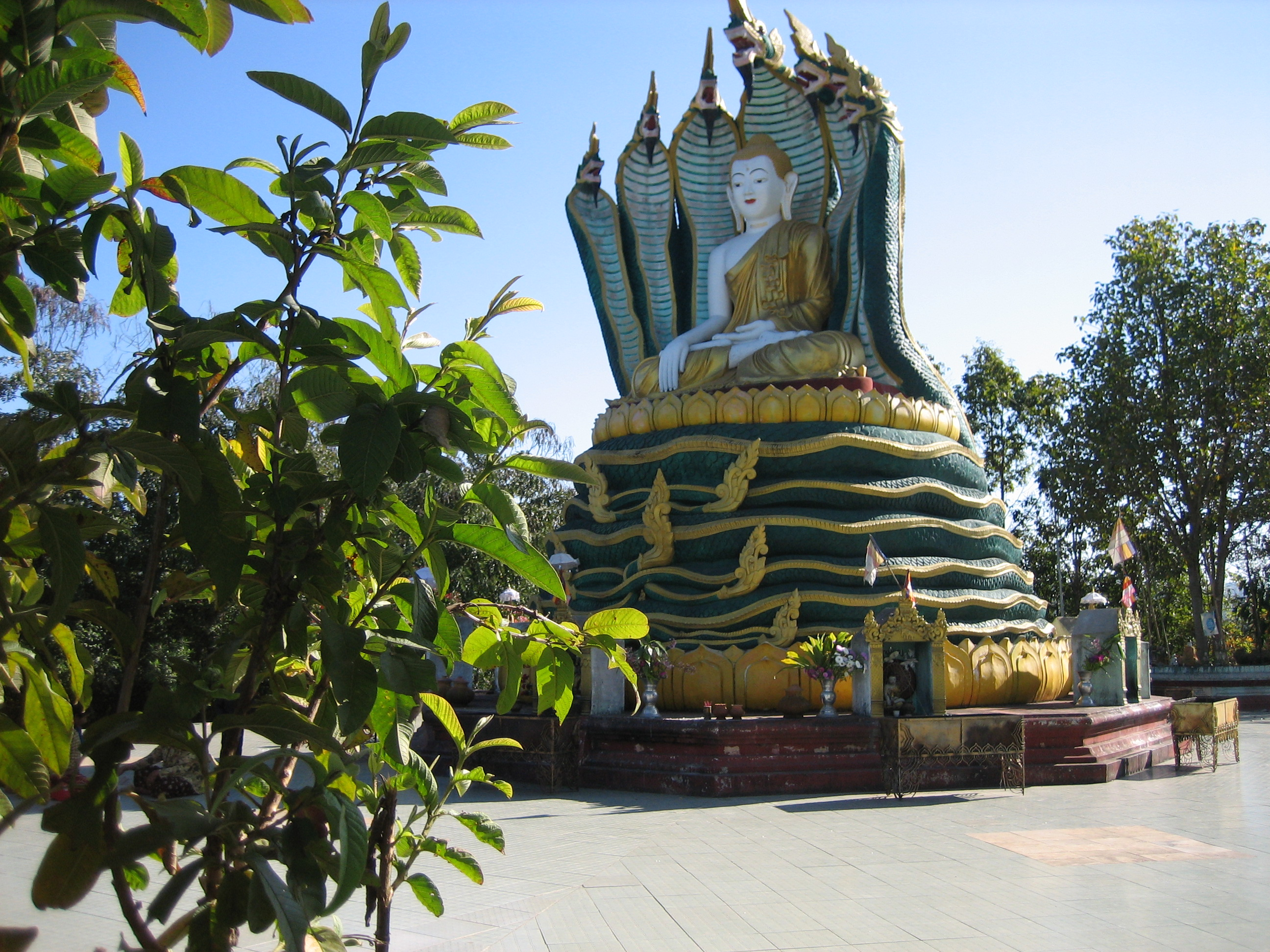
Nagayon Pagoda

Sutaungpyay Pagoda

Sunset in Lashio

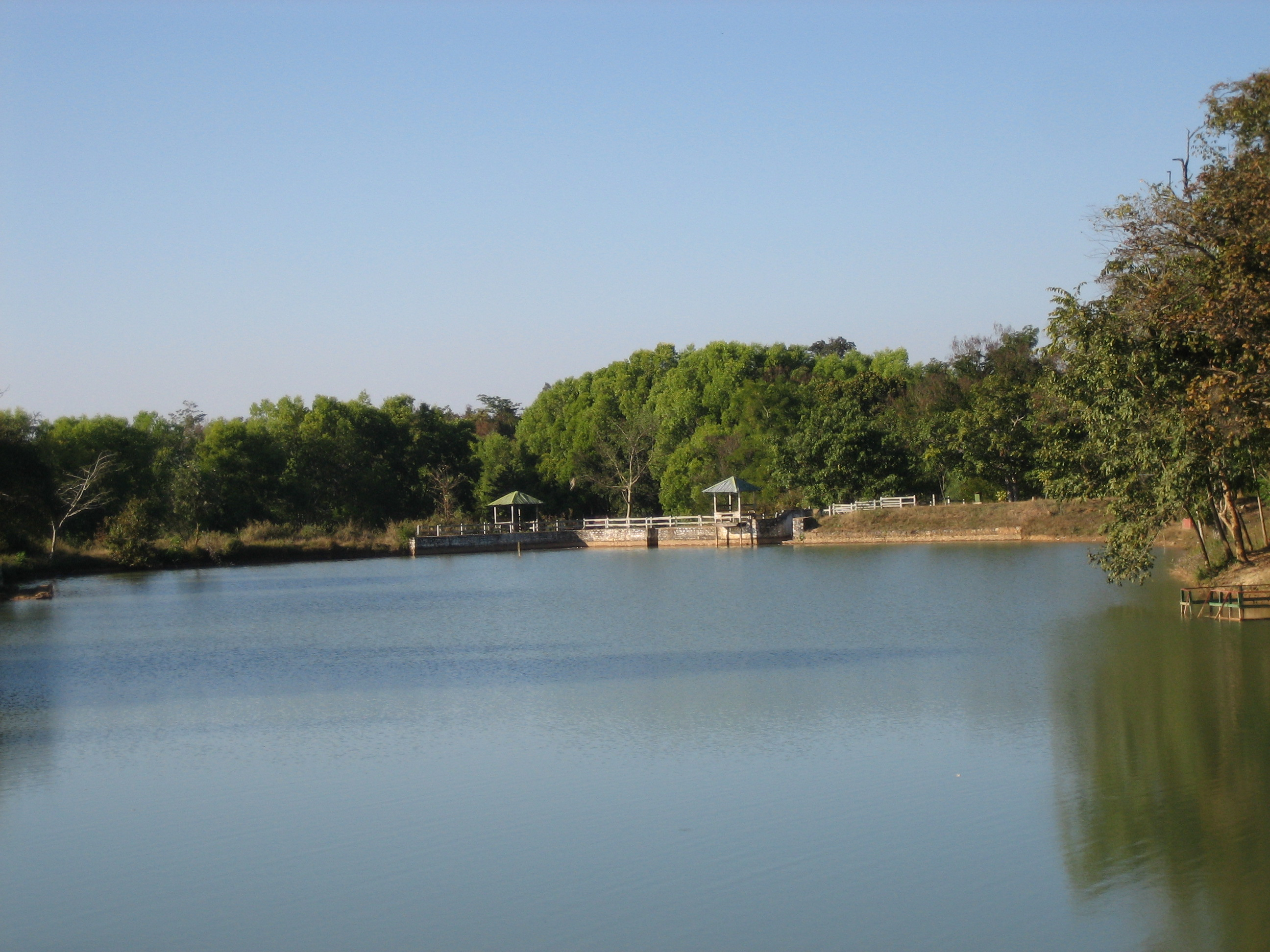
Lake in Lashio

== See also ==
- Lashio Airport
- Lashio Township
- Sino-Myanmar pipelines
