= Namtu Township =

Namtu Township နမ္မတူမြို့နယ်
- Township
- Location in Kyaukme district

- Location within Myanmar
- Coordinates: 23°5′0″N 97°24′0″E
- Country: Myanmar
- State: Shan State
- District: Kyaukme District
- Elevation: 1,834 ft (559 m)
- Time zone: UTC+6:30 (MMT)

Namtu Township (Burmese: နမ္မတူမြို့နယ်) is a township of Kyaukme District in Shan State, Myanmar. The principal town is Namtu.
