= Foreign commerce and shipping of the Empire of Japan =

During the Empire of Japan and up to 1945, Japan was dependent on imported foods and raw materials for industry. At the time, Japan had one of the largest merchant fleets in the world with a total of approximately 6 million tonnes of displacement before December 1941. Despite heavy naval losses during the Pacific War, Japan was still left with 4,700,000 tonnes.

== Trade ==
Despite popular perception, during the 1930s Japan was exporting low-cost items successfully. However, between the years of 1929 and 1938 foreign commerce dropped from 3.7% to 3.5%. Japan ran a trade deficit, selling a total of US$12.85 and buying US$15.25 per capita. This was in part brought on by the purchase of wartime materials.

Japan's primary trading partners in order were:

- United States
- Manchukuo
- Wang Jingwei Government
- Mengjiang
- Occupied Chinese territories
- India
- United Kingdom
- Dutch Indies

Japan exported 32% of its total output to the United States, and purchased 21% of its foreign trade.

Japan's imports were as follows:

- 32% - cotton
- 9% - wool
- 9% - iron
- 6% - petroleum
- 4% - machinery
- 3% - soybeans
- 2% - wheat

Japan's exports were as follows:

- 19% - wool articles
- 15% - raw silk
- 15% - rayon
- 3% - machinery

Japan's primary exports were raw silk, controlling 80% of the world's production, and tea, controlling 10%.

Japan's total foreign trade was equivalent to Belgium, a country with less than 10% of Japan's population.

In 1897, the local monetary unit, the yen, was valued on the gold standard at a base level of 24.5 British Pence, which permits the use in the figures of the pound sterling or gold-backed US dollars.

(1 Yen = 24.5 British Penny or 10.8 Yen = 1 British Guinea = 1.05 Pounds Sterling)

Values in millions of British Pounds
Dates	Imports	Exports
1891 to 1895	11.51	12.61
1901 to 1905	35.92	30.23
1906 to 1910	46.40	43.70
1911 to 1913	64.63	55.51
1925 to 1929	213.48	187.55

Values in millions of Gold United States Dollars
Dates	Imports	Exports
1891–1895	55	60
1901–1905	175	150
1906–1910	230	215
1911–1913	320	275
1925–1929	1,050	925

During the worldwide depression (1931 to 1934), Japanese exterior commerce grew. The expansion of this trade was in part due to European difficulties in supplying their colonies, allowing Japan to expand into new markets. Before the war, crude silk represented one-third of exports and 10% of processed silk. Other products for export were rayon, cotton, processed silk and others. In 1937 exports were crude silk, cotton fabrics, and rayon. Japan was importing raw cotton, wool, and oil imported products.

== See also ==
- Imperial Japanese Army Railways and Shipping Section
- Japanese naval codes including Merchant-shipping codes: JN-39 (Maru code)/JN-40/JN-152/JN-167
- Ministry of the Navy (Japan)
