= Bawdwin =

Village in Myanmar

- Village
- Location in Myanmar (Burma)
- Coordinates: 23°7′N 97°18′E
- Country: Myanmar
- State: Shan State
- District: Kyaukme District
- Township: Namtu Township
- Village: Bawdwin
- Elevation: 3,200 ft (980 m)

Population
  - Ethnicities: Shan Chinese Burmese
- Time zone: UTC+6.30 (MMT)

Bawdwin is a village in northeast Myanmar (formerly Burma).

== Geography ==
Bawdwin is situated in the northern Shan State's Namtu Township, Kyaukme District in Myanmar (formerly Upper Burma). It is located 150 km from the Chinese border.

== Early history ==
Since the 15th century, the Bawdwin village has been a hub for mining operations and was controlled for centuries by China before British colonists arrived. Records and the remnants of temples, mosques, theaters, and other public structures and bridges indicate that Bawdwin was once a thriving Chinese colony. Discoveries of manacled skeletons and inscriptions in the neighborhood indicate that the region and its mine served as one of the Chinese government's prison settlements. The Ming dynasty used ancient Chinese laborers to mine silver at Bawdwin Mine as early as 1412 A.D. Up to 20,000 laborers were reportedly working at Bawdwin by the eighteenth century. In 1868, the area was abandoned amid the Panthay Rebellion.

Mining interests would resurface under British rule, reestablishing Bawdwin into a mining community from 1903 to the 1920s. The Bawdwin Mine's surroundings were developed. The area included its own railway, civil police force, local court, post offices, residential quarters, schools, and one of Upper Burma's (now Myanmar) largest hospitals.

== Landmarks ==
- Bawdwin Mine

== See also ==
- Namtu Township
