= List of railway stations in Myanmar =

List of railway stations in Myanmar.

== Maps ==
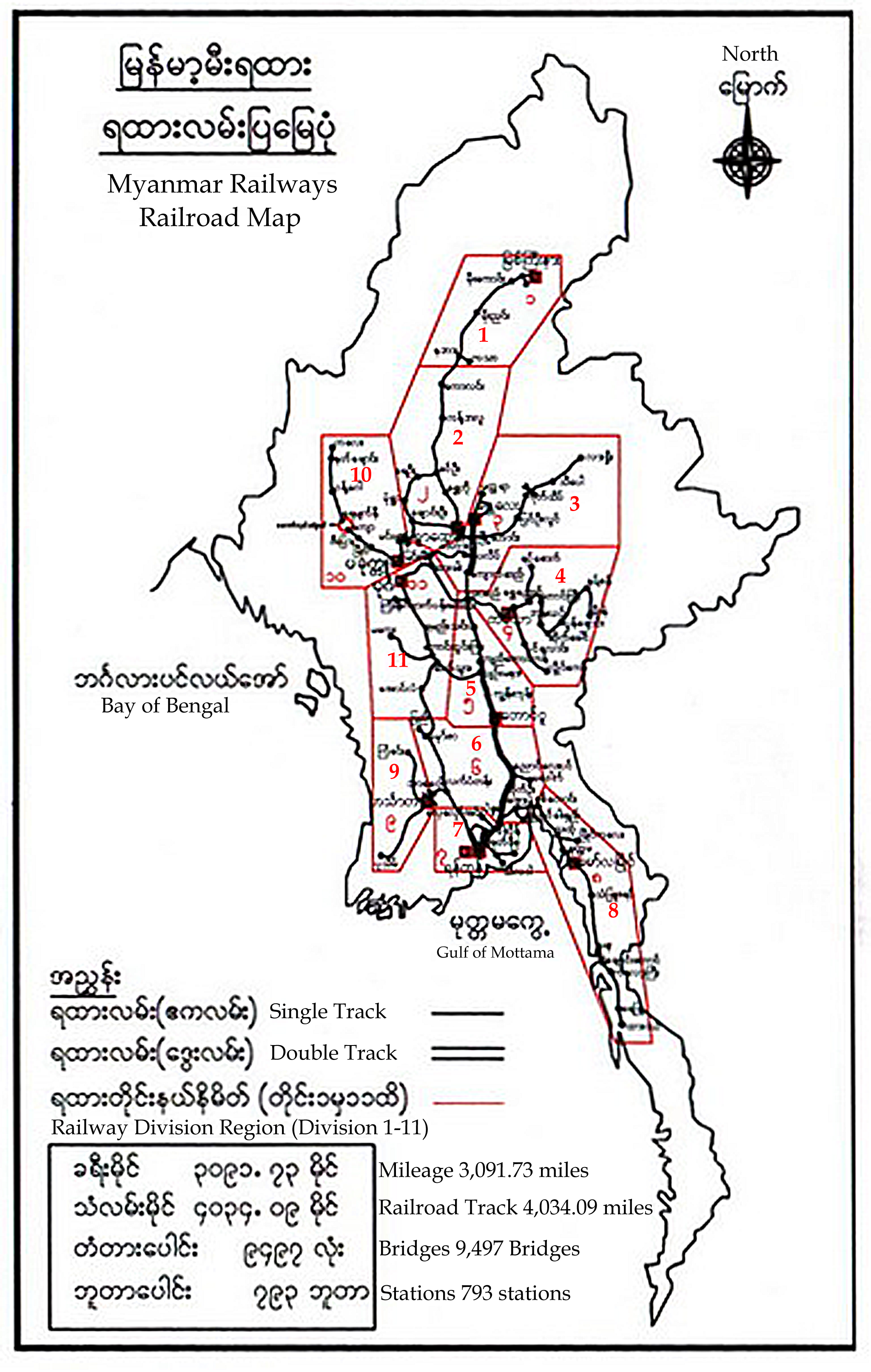
Myanmar Railways Division Map

- UNHCR Atlas Map - shows Topography
- UN Map Myanmar - shows Provinces
- Geography of Myanmar

== Division 1 Myitkyina ==
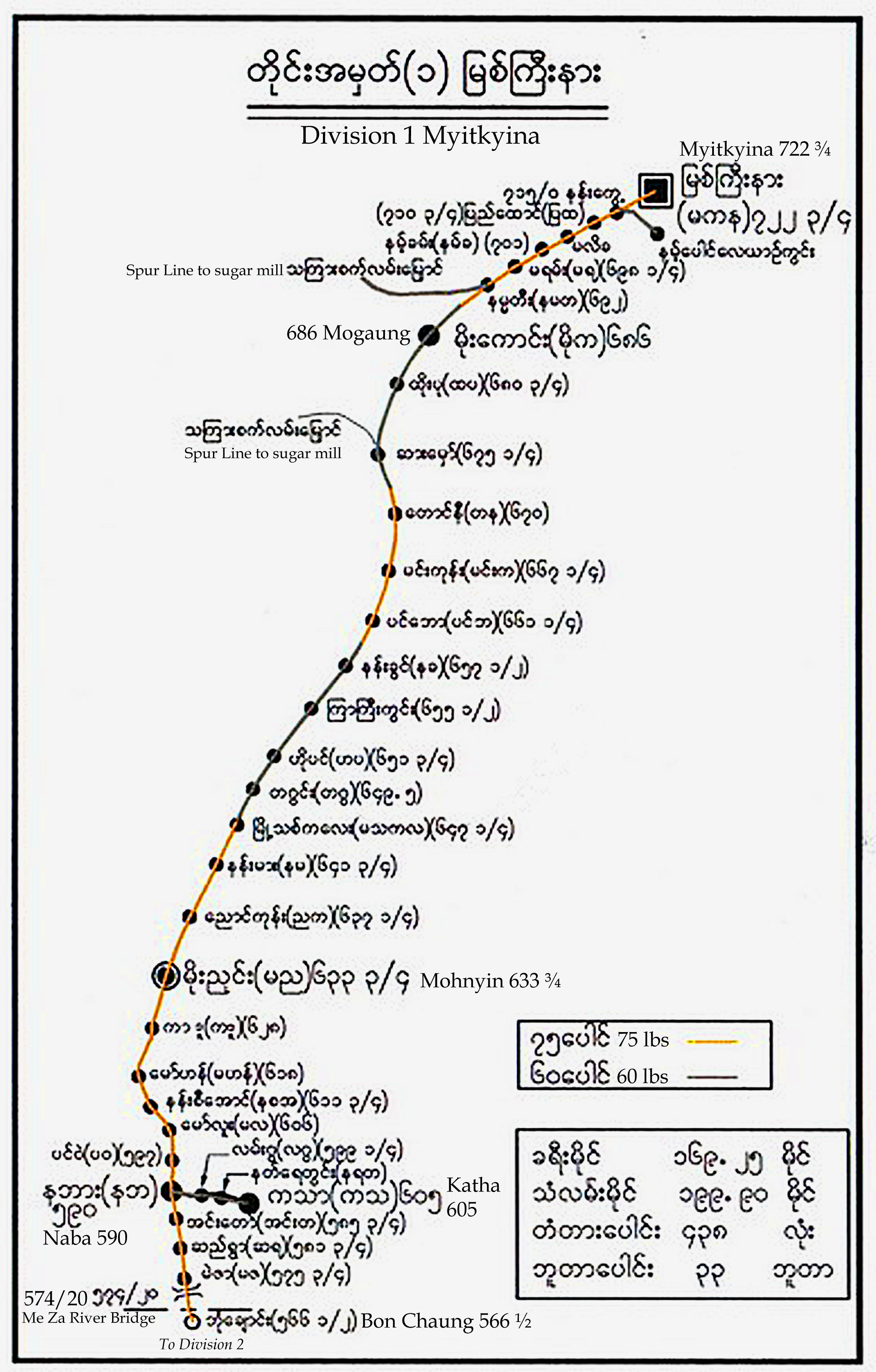
Myanmar Railways station map Division 1 Myitkyina

- Mileage: 169.25 miles (272.38 km)
- Railroad Track: 199.90 miles (321.71 km)
- Bridges: 438
- Station: 33

=== Mandalay–Myitkyina Line ===
- (1) Myitkyina 722 3/4 miles from Yangon
- (2) Nam Koi 715/0 Spur Line to Nampon Airport
- (3) Pyi htaung 710 3/4
- (4) Malika -
- (5) Nam Hkam 701
- (6) Mayam 698 1/4
- (7) Nanmati 692 Spur Line to Sugar Mill
- (8) Mogaung 686
- (9) Hto Pu 680 3/4
- (10) Sar Hmaw 675 1/4 Spur Line to Sugar Mill
- (11) Taung Ni 670
- (12) Min Gon 667 1/4
- (13) Pinbaw 661 1/4
- (14) Nam Khwin 657 1/2
- (15) Kya Gyi Kwin 655 1/2
- (16) Hopin 651 3/4
- (17) Ta Kwin 649.5
- (18) Myo Thit Ka Lay 647 1/4
- (19) Namma 641 3/4
- (20) Nyaung Kone 637 1/4
- (21) Mohnyin 633 3/4
- (22) Kadu 628
- (23) Maw Han 618
- (24) Nam Si Aung 611 3/4
- (25) Maw Lu 606
- (26) Pin Wei 597
- (27) Naba (Junction) 590 Branch Line to Katha 605
- (28) Indaw 585 3/4
- (29) Se Ywa 581 3/4
- (30) Me Zar 575 3/4

Me Zar River Bridge 574/ 20

- Bon Chaung 566 1/2 (Division 2)

=== Naba-Katha Line ===
- (27) Naba (Junction) 590
- (31) Lan Gwa 599 1/4
- (32) Nat Yae Twin -
- (33) Katha 605

== Division 2 Ywa-Htaung ==
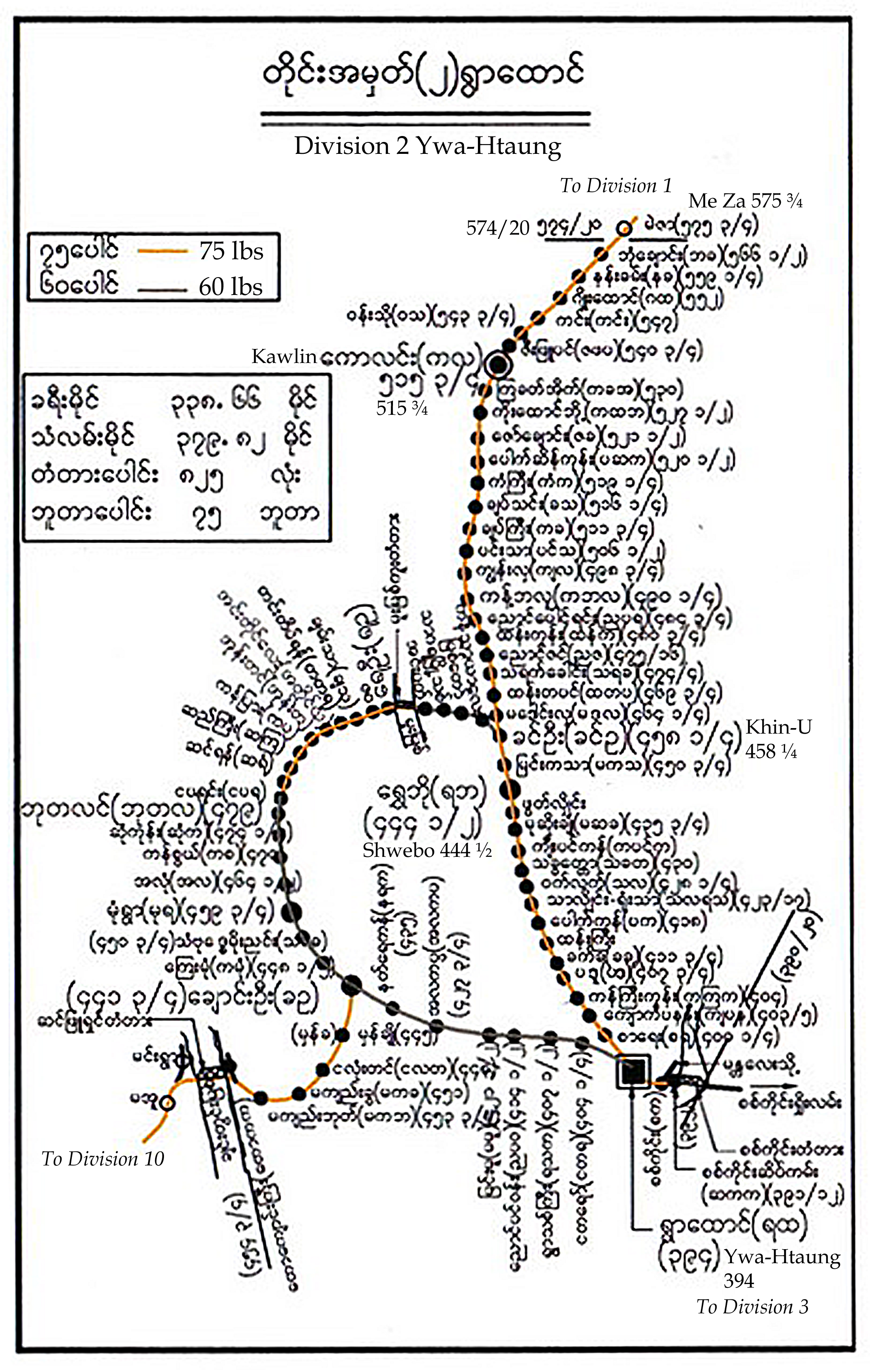
Myanmar Railways station map Division 2 Ywa-Htaung

- Mileage: 338.66 miles (545.02 km)
- Railroad Track: 379.82 miles (611.26 km)
- Bridges: 825
- Stations: 75

=== Mandalay–Myitkyina Line ===
- Me Zar 575 3/4 (from Division 1)

- (1) Bon Chaung 566 1/2
- (2) Nan Khan 559 1/4
- (3) Gyo Daung 552
- (4) Kin 547
- (5) Wun Tho 543 3/4
- (6) Win Gyi Pin 540 3/4
- (7) Kawlin 535 3/4
- (8) Kya Khat Aing 530
- (9) Koe Taung Boet 527 1/2
- (10) Sin Gaung 521 1/2
- (11) Pauk Sein Kone 520 1/2
- (12) Kan Gyi 519 1/4
- (13) Chat Thin 516 1/4
- (14) Chet Gyi 511 3/4
- (15) Pin Tha 506 1/2
- (16) Kyunhla 498 3/4
- (17) Kanbalu 490 1/4
- (18) Nyaung Pin 484 3/4
- (19) Htan Kan 480 3/4
- (20) Nyaung Zin 475 /16
- (21) Thaya Kone 474 /4
- (22) Htan Ta Pin 469 3/4
- (23) Ma Daung Lu 464 1/4
- (24) Khin-U 458 1/4 (Junction) To Ye-U
- (25) Myin Ka Tha 450 3/4
- (26) Shwebo 444 1/2
- (27) Hput Hlaing -
- (28) Moke Soe Chon 435 3/4
- (29) Kyee Pin Kan -
- (30) Tha Khut Taw 430
- (31) Wetlet 428 1/4
- (32) Tha Hlaing-Yone Tha 423/17
- (33) Pauk Kan 418
- (34) Htan Gyi -
- (35) Khet Kha 411 3/4
- (36) Padu 407 3/4
- (37) Kan Gyi Kone 404
- (38) Kyauk Pa Nan 403/5
- (39) Sa Ye 400 1/4
- (40) Ywa-Htaung 394 (Junction) To Chaung-U
- (41) Sagaing 392 Spur Line to (42) Sagaing Port 391/12
- Sagaing Bridge 390/20 To Mandalay (Division 3)

- (40) Ywa-Htaung 394 (Junction)
- (43) Nga Ta Yaw 404 1/4
- (44) Ywa Thit Gyi 407 1/2
- (45) Nyaung Pin Wun 414 1/2
- (46) Myinmu 421 1/2
- (47) Alakatpa 427 3/4
- (48) Nat Yae Kan 435
- (49) Chaung-U 441 3/4 (Junction) To Pakokku
- (50) Kyeh Mon 448 1/2
- (51) Than Bo Dwe Mo Nyin 450 3/4
- (52) Monywa 459 3/4
- (53) Za Loke 464 1/2
- (54) Kan Swei 470
- (55) Son Kone 474 1/2
- (56) Budalin 479
- (57) Nga Pu Yin -
- (58) Sin Yan -
- (59) Se Gyi -
- (60) Kan Pya -
- (61) On Din -
- (62) In Daing Ga Lay -
- (63) Tin Tein Yan -
- (64) Chan Tha -
- (65) Za Wa -
- (66) Ye-U -
- Mu River Bridge
- (67) In Bat -
- (68) Tha Ga Ya Myo Thit -
- (69) Myit Taw -
- (70) Kan Thar Yar Lay -
- (24) Khin-U 458 1/4 (Junction)

- (49) Chaung-U 441 3/4 (Junction)
- (71) Hman Cho 445
- (72) Nga Lone Tin 448
- (73) Ma Gyi Gwa 451
- (74) Ma Gyi Boke 453 3/4
- (75)Taw Kyaung Gyi 454 3/4
- Chindwin River Bridge (Sin Phyu Shin Bridge)

- Min Ywa, Ma Au (Division 10 Pakokku)

== Division 3 Mandalay ==
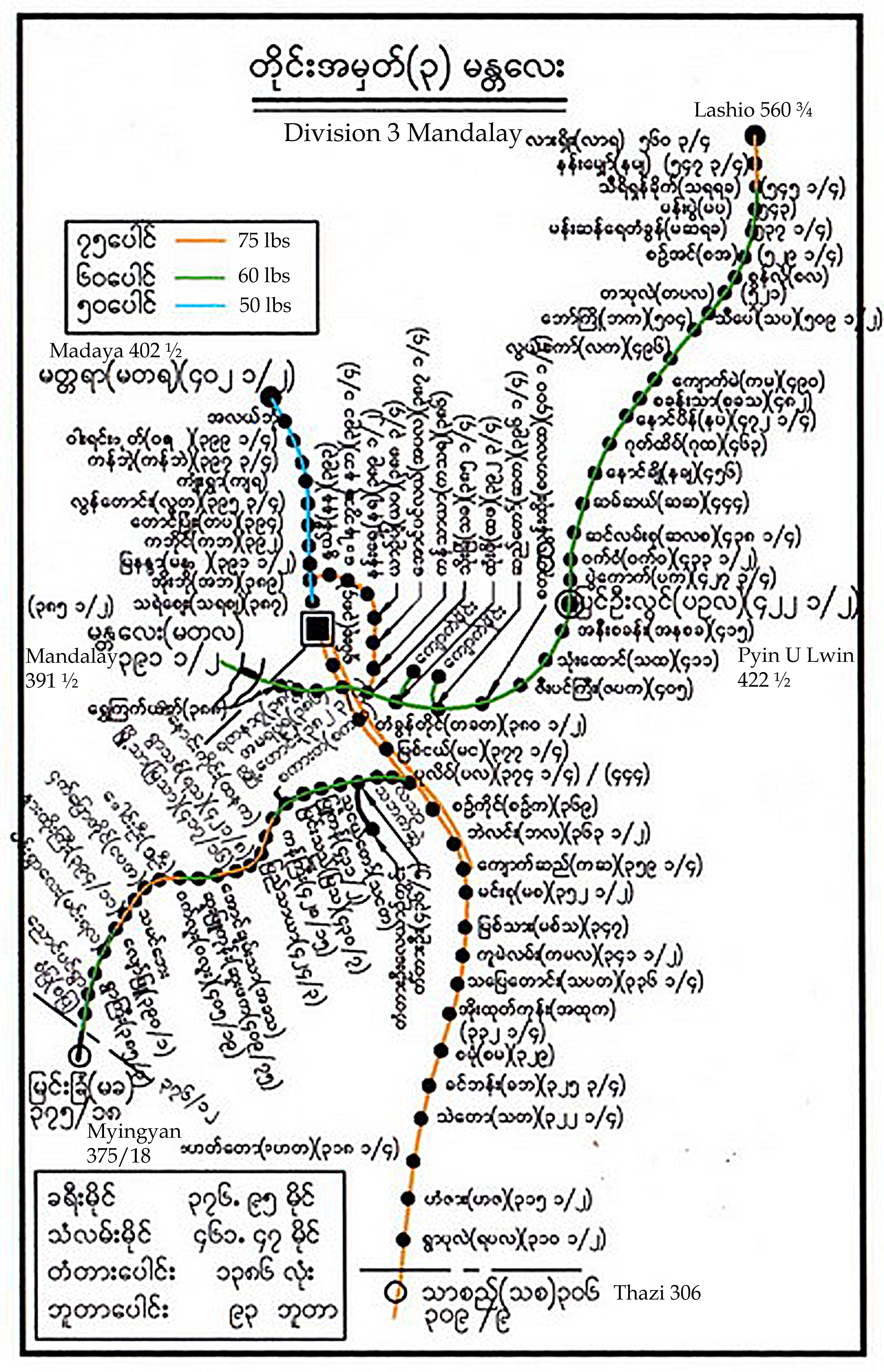
Myanmar Railways station map Division 3 Mandalay

- Mileage: 376.95 miles (606.64 km)
- Railroad Track: 461.47 miles (742.66 km)
- Bridges: 1386
- Stations: 93

=== Mandalay–Myitkyina Line ===
- Sagaing Bridge 390/20 (from Division 2 Ywa-Htaung)

- (1) Shwe Kyet Yet 388
- (2) Ya Ta Na Gu 387
- (3) Amarapura 386
- (4) Myo Haung 382 3/4 (Junction to Lashio)

- (5) Shanzu 389
- (6) Mandalay 390 1/2

=== Yangon-Mandalay Line ===
- (6) Mandalay 390 1/2
- (5) Shanzu 389
- (4) Myohaung 382 3/4 (Junction to Lashio)
- (7) Ta Gun Daing 380 1/2
- (8) Myitnge 377 1/4
- (9) Paleik 374 1/4 (444) (Junction to Myingyan)
- (10) Sintgaing 369
- (11) Be Lin 363 1/2
- (12) Kyaukse 359 1/4
- (13) Minsu 352 1/2
- (14) Myittha 347
- (15) Ku Me Lan 341 1/2
- (16) Tha Pyay Taung 336 1/4
- (17) Odokkon 332 1/4
- (18) Sa Mun 329
- (19) Khin Ban 325 3/4
- (20) The Daw 322 1/4
- (21) Da Hat Taw 318 1/4
- (22) Han Za 315 1/2
- (23) Ywa Pale 310 1/2
- 309/9 to Thazi 306 (Division 4)

=== Mandalay–Lashio Line ===
- (4) Myo Haung 382 3/4
- (24) Thoe Gyan 385 1/4 (Junction) to Tha Ye Ze
- (25) Tonbo 392 3/4 Spur Line to the quarry
- (26) Sedaw 396 1/4 Spur Line to the quarry
- (27) Sa Tu Ta Lun Hto 400 1/4 Zig Zag railway
- (28) Zi Pin Gyi 405
- (29) Thondaung 411
- (30) Anisakan 415
- (31) Pyin U Lwin 422 1/2
- (32) Pwe Kaul 427 3/4
- (33) Wet Wun 433 1/2
- (34) Sin Lan Su 438 1/4
- (35) Hsam Ma Hse 444
- (36) Nawnghkio 456
- (37) Gokteik 463 Gokteik Viaduct
- (38) Nawngpeng 472 1/4
- (39) Sa Khan Tha 482
- (40) Kyaukme 490
- (41) Loi Hkaw 496
- (42) Taw Gyi 504
- (43) Hsipaw 509 1/2
- (44) Ta Hpa Le 521
- (45) Sun Lon -
- (46) Se-eng 529 1/4
- (47) Man Sam Ye Da Gun (Man Sam Waterfall) 537 1/4
- (48) Man Pwe 543
- (49) Thi Ri Shan Hkai 545 1/4
- (50) Nam-yau 547 3/4 (Junction) to Namtu Mine Railway
- (51) Lashio 560 3/4

Connection to China proposed 1,435 mm (4 ft 8 1/2 in) gauge

- Kyaukphyu Port
- Namyao
- Kutkai
- Muse Myanmar
- border Myanmar China
- Ruili China
- under construction
- Baoshan
- Dali (junction with Chinese Railways)

=== Myingyan Line ===
- (9) Paleik 444 (374 1/4) (Junction)
- (52) La Tha -
- (53) Tha Bet Hswe -
- (54) Tada-U 436/5 Branch Line to (55) Tada-U Airport -
- (56) Thu Nge Daw -
- (57) Pyu Kan 431/2
- (58) Myin Thei 430/7
- (59) Sa Ka Tha -
- (60) Kan Gyi 428/15
- (61) Ta Naung Gaing -
- (62)Pyi Tha Ya (Gwaykone)424/3
- (63) Ywa Thit 421/8
- (64) Myo Tha 417/16
- (65) Aung Chan Tha -
- (66) Su Hpyu Kone 409/75
- (67) Wet Lu 405/19
- (68) Daung U -
- (69) Hnget Pyaw Aing -
- (70) Tha Min Be -
- (71) Natogyi 394/11
- (72) Shaw Byu 390/1
- (73) Pin Ywa Lay -
- (74) Ywa Gyi 385/8
- (75) Nyaung Pin Tha -
- (76) San Bya -
- 376/12 to Myingyan 375/18 (Division 11)

=== Tha Ye Ze Line ===
- (24) Thoe Gyan 385 1/4 (Junction)
- (77) Kanthaya 386
- (78) Aung Pin Le 387 1/4
- (79) Yin Pyan 388 3/4
- (80) Nanshe 389 1/2
- (81) Dawna Bwar 391 1/4
- (82) Nwe Ni 393
- (83) Oh Bo 389 (Junction)
- (84) Tha Ye Ze 387

=== Madaya Line ===
- (83) Oh Bo 389 (Junction)
- (85) Mya Na Nwa 391 1/2
- (86) Ka Baing 392
- (87) Taung Pyone 394
- (88) Lun Taung 395 3/4
- (89) Kyon Ywa -
- (90) Kan Beit 397 3/4
- (91) Wa Yin Dauk 399 1/4
- (92) Ale Bon -
- (93) Madaya 402 1/2

== Division 4 Kalaw ==
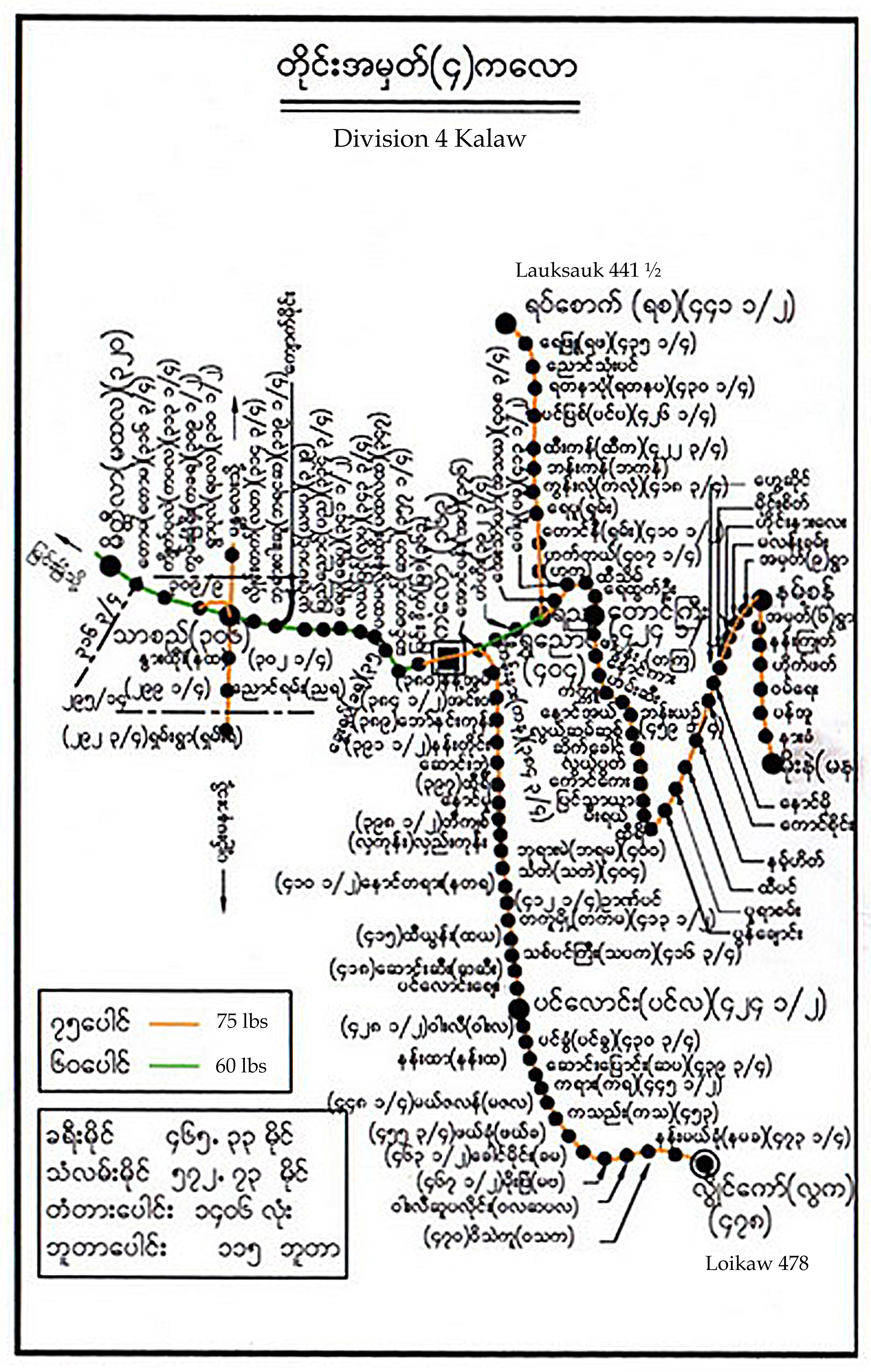
Myanmar Railways station map Division 4 Kalaw

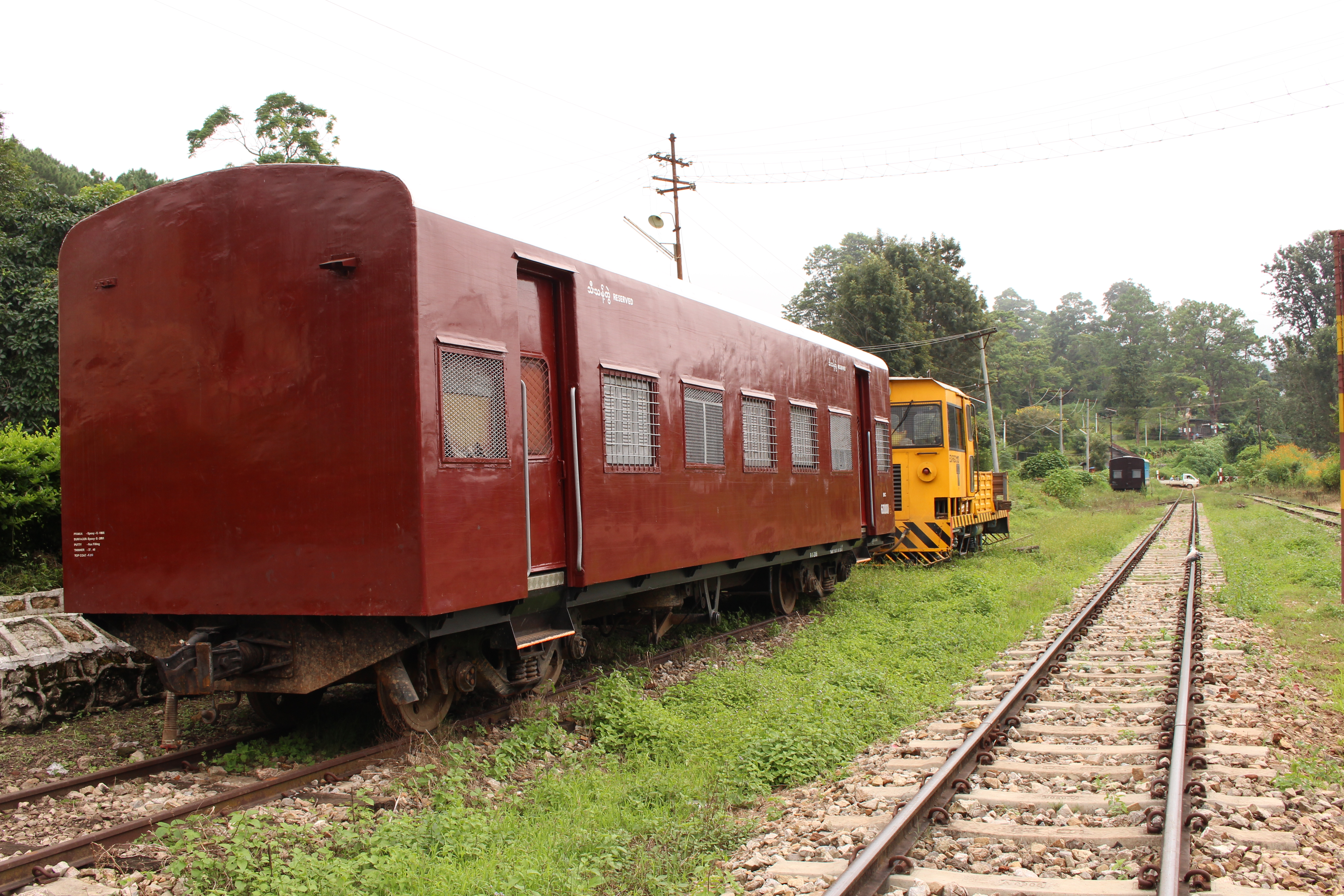
Kalaw Railway Station

- Mileage: 465.33 miles (748.88 km)
- Railroad Track: 572.73 miles (921.72 km)
- Bridges: 1406
- Stations: 115 (Only 102 Stations shown on map)

=== Kalaw-Thazi Line ===
- (1) Kalaw 369
- (2) Myin Daik 361
- (3) Hsin Taung 357 1/4
- (4) Khway Yok 352
- (5) Pa Ta Ma Lun Hto 347
- (6) Le Byin 343 3/4
- (7) Ye Bu 341 1/2
- (8) Pyi Nyaung 334 3/4
- (9) Yin Ma Pin 329
- (10) Pa Ya Nga Zu 319 1/4 Spur Line to the quarry
- (11) Hlaing Tet 314 3/4
- (12) Thazi 306 (Junction) to Mandalay and Pyinmana
- (13) Kun Chan Yi 309 1/2
- (14) Kyaik Pu Le 313 1/4
- (15) Taw Ma 316 3/4

- Meiktila 320 Continued to Myingyan (Division 11)

=== Yangon-Mandalay Line ===
- Ywa Pa Le 310 1/2 (Division 3)
- (12) Thazi 306
- (16) Nwa Do 302 1/4
- (17) Nyaung Yan 299 1/4
- 295/14

- Shan Ywa 292 3/4 Continued to Pyinmana (Division 5)

=== Loikaw Line ===
- (1) Kalaw 369
- (18) Aungpan 376 (Junction) to Lawksawk, Moene
- (19) Nan On 380
- (20) In Wun 384 1/2
- (21) Baw Nin Gon 389
- (22) Nan Taing 391 1/2
- (23) Chaung Pwet -
- (24) Ton 397
- (25) Nawng Mun -
- (26) Hti Ji 398 1/2
- (27) Hle Gon -
- (28) Bu Ya Me 400
- (29) Ta Te 404
- (30) Naungtayar 410 1/2
- (31) Nye Pin 412 1/4
- (32) Ta Ku Myo 413 1/2
- (33) Hti Yun 415
- (34) Thit Pin Gyi 416 3/4
- (35) Saung Hsi 418
- (36) Pin Laung Ze -
- (37) Pinlaung 424 1/2
- (38) Wa Lee 428 1/2
- (39) Pin Hkun 430 3/4
- (40) Nan Hta -
- (41) Hsaung Pyaung 439 3/4
- (42) Ka Ya 445 1/2
- (43) Me Za Lan 448 1/4
- (44) Ka The 453
- (45) Pe Kon 455 3/4
- (46) Hkaung Mong 463 1/2
- (47) Mong Pya 467 1/2
- (48) Wa Li Su Pa Laing -
- (49) Wi The Ku 470
- (50) Nan Me Hkun 473 1/4
- (51) Loikaw 478

=== Kalaw-Lawksawk Line ===
- (1) Kalaw 369
- (18) Aungpan 376 (Junction) to Loikaw 478
- (52) Kan Na 384 3/4
- (53) He Ho 392 3/4 Spiral railroad
- (54) Shwe Nyaung 404 (Junction) to Moene
- (55) He Ke 407 1/4
- (56) Taung Ni 410 1/2
- (57) Yae Pu -
- (58) Kwin Lon 418 3/4
- (59) Ban Kan -
- (60) Htee Hkan 422 3/4
- (61) Pin Hpyit 426 1/4
- (62) Yadana Pon 430 1/4
- (63) Nyaung Htan Pin -
- (64) Yae Hpyu 435 1/4
- (65) Lawksawk (Yat Sauk) 441 1/2

=== Shwe Nyaung-Taunggyi-Nansan-Mong Nai Line ===
- (54) Shwe Nyaung 404 (Junction) to Lawksauk 441 1/2
- (66) Aye Tha Ya 408 3/4
- (67) Paw Mu 413 1/2
- (68) Hti Thin -
- (69) Ye Twe-U -
- (70) Taunggyi 424 1/2
- (71) Hpa Mun -
- (72) Naung Kar -
- (73) Hang Si -
- (74) Kek Ku -
- (75) Naung Ae -
- (76) Ban Yin 459 3/4
- (77) Loi Hsan Sit -
- (78) Hsaik Hkaung -
- (79) Loi Pu -
- (80) Kaung Ke -
- (81) Pyin Tha Ya -
- (82) Mi Ye -
- (83) Thi Yi -
- (84) Pwin Chaung -
- (85) Pu Ya Sin -
- (86) Thi Pin -
- (87) Nam Hu -
- (88) Kaung Maing -
- (89) Naung Mo -
- (90) Hwe Hse -
- (91) Maing Sit -
- (92) Haing Na Nge La -
- (93) Ma Lan Hkam -
- (94) Ah Hma 5 Ywa -
- (95) Nansang -
- (96) Ah Hma 6 Ywa -
- (97) Nan Kyu -
- (98) Haik Hpa -
- (99) Wan Ye -
- (100) Pang Au -
- (101) Na Hkan -
- (102) Mong Nai (Moene) -

== Division 5 Taungoo ==
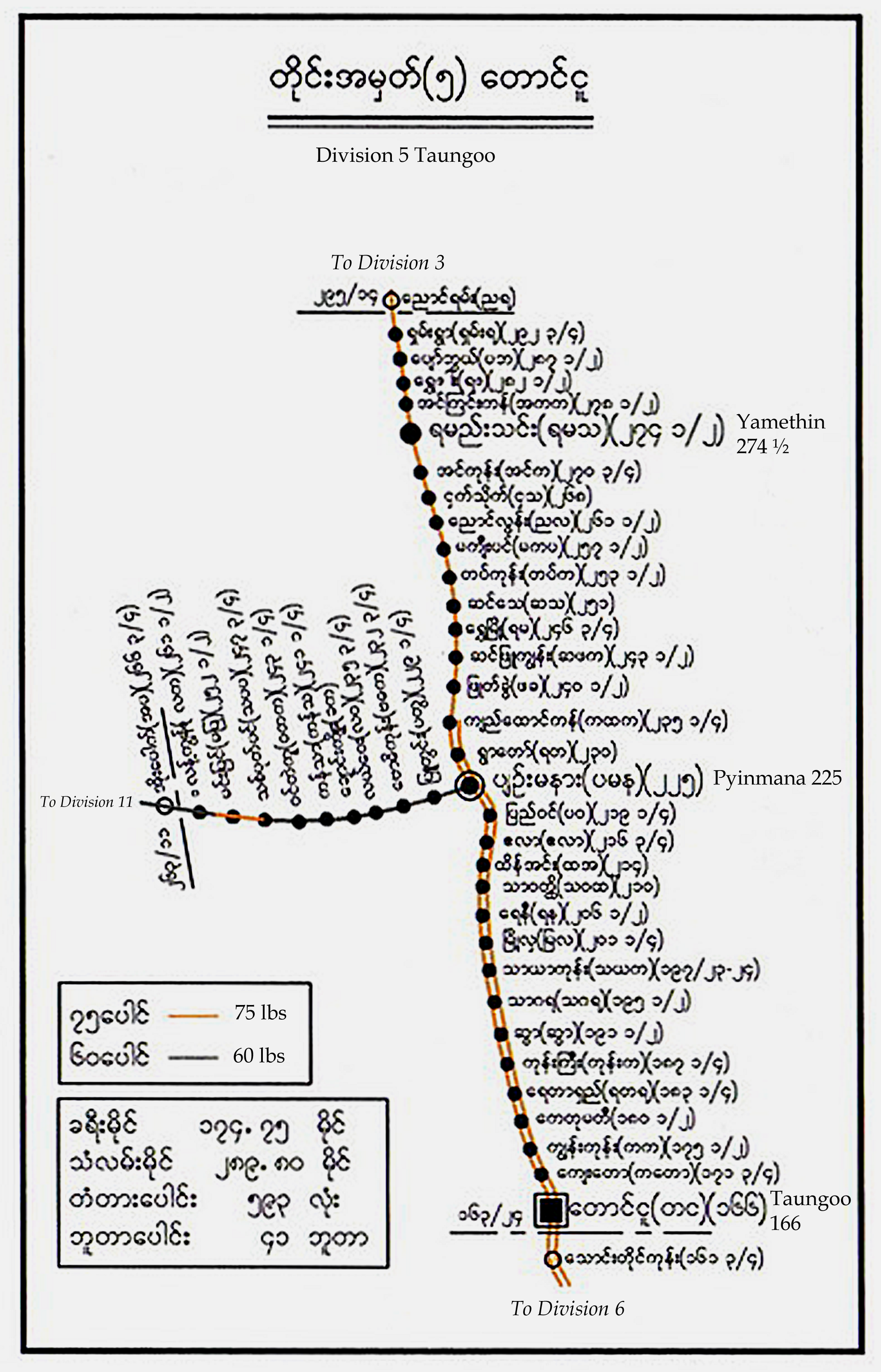
Myanmar Railways station map Division 5 Taungoo

- Mileage: 174.75 miles (281.23 km)
- Railroad Track: 289.80 miles (466.39 km)
- Bridges: 593
- Stations: 42 (Nay Pyi Taw included)
- Nyaung Yan 295/14 (Division 3)

=== Yangon-Mandalay Line ===
- (1) Shan Ywa 292 3/4
- (2) Pyawbwe 287 1/2
- (3) Shwe Da 282 1/2
- (4) In Gyin Kan 278 1/2
- (5) Yamethin 274 1/2
- (6) Inn Gon 270 3/4
- (7) Hnge Taik 268
- (8) Nyaung Lunt 261 1/2
- (9) Ma Gyi Bin 257 1/2
- (10) Tatkon 253 1/2
- (11) Sin The 251
- (12) Shwe Myo 246 3/4
- (13) Sin Byu Gyun 243 1/2
- (14) Pyok Kwe 240 1/2
- (15) Kyihtaunggan 235 1/4
- (16) Nay Pyi Taw 233/0 Inaugurated on 5 July 2009
- (17) Ywataw 230
- (18) Pyinmana 225 (Junction) to Taungdwingyi
- (19) Pyi Win 219 1/4
- (20) Ela 216 3/4
- (21) Htein-In 214
- (22) Tha Wat Ti 210
- (23) Yae Ni 206 1/2
- (24) Myo Hla 201 1/4
- (25) Tha Yet Kone 197/23-24
- (26) Thar Ga Ya 195 1/2
- (27) Swar 191 1/2
- (28) Kone Gyi 187 1/4
- (29) Ye Da She 183 1/4
- (30) Kay Tu Ma Ti 180 1/2
- (31) Kyun Kone 175 1/2
- (32) Kyee Taw 171 1/2
- (33) Taungoo 166
- 163/24

- Thaung Taing Kone 161 3/4 (Division 6)

=== Pyinmana-Taungdwingyi Line ===
- (18) Pyinmana 225 (Junction)
- (34) Pyu Twin 229 1/4
- (35) Baw Ti Gon 232 3/4
- (36) Le We 235 3/4
- (37) Chaung Kyoe -
- (38) Kan Thar 241 1/4
- (39) Win Te Gu 243 1/4
- (40) Thit Poke Pin 247 3/4
- (41) Min Pyin 252 1/2
- (42) Da Lant Chun 261 1/2
- 263/11

- Oh Bauk 266 3/4 (Division 11)

== Division 6 Yangon Division ==
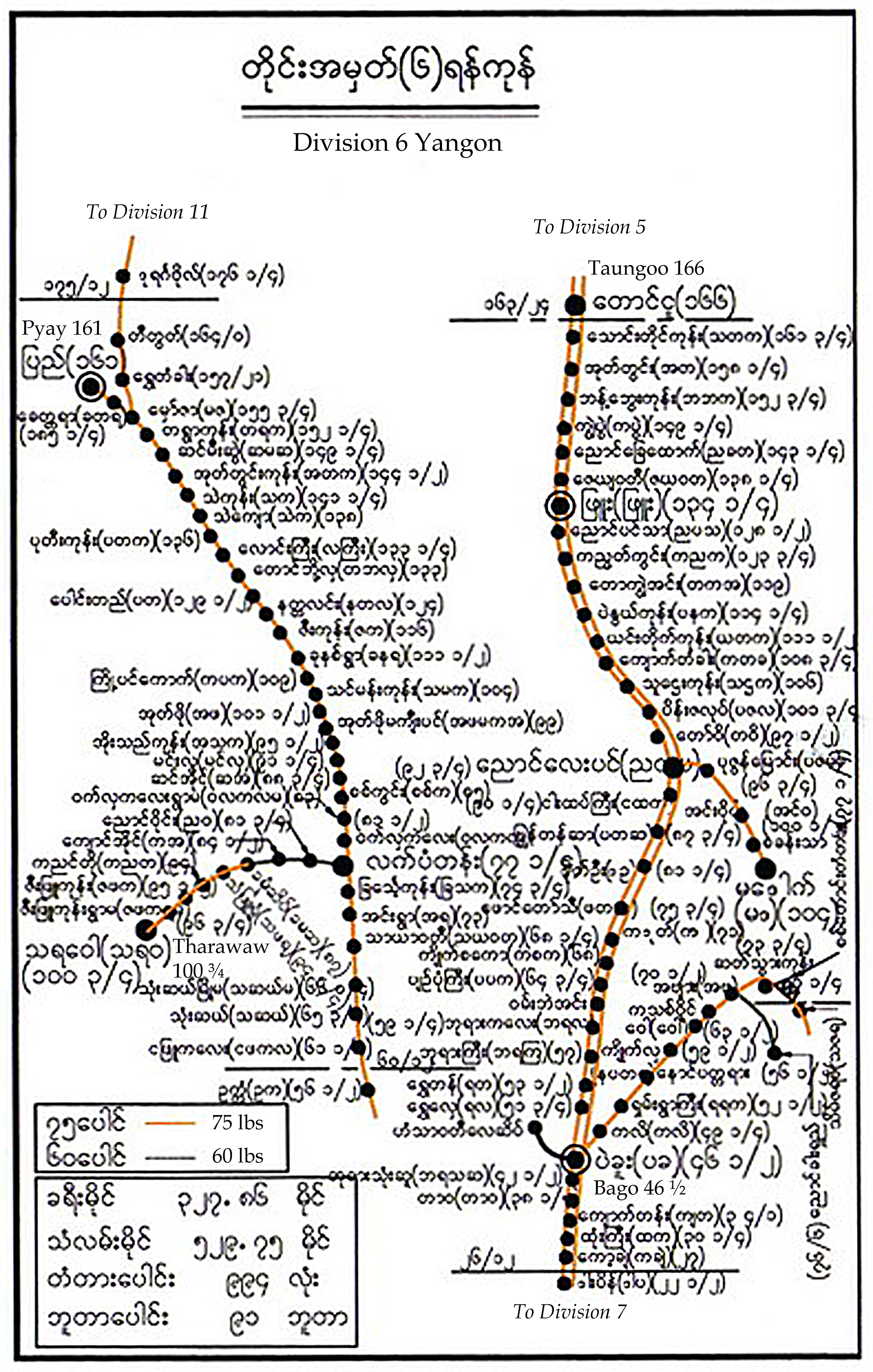
Myanmar Railways station map Division 6 Yangon

- Mileage: 327.86 miles (527.64 km)
- Railway Track: 529.75 miles (852.55 km)
- Bridges 994 Bridges
- Stations 91 Stations
- Dar Pein 22 1/2 (junction to Hlehlaw-In 44) (Division 7)

=== Yangon-Mandalay Line ===
- (1) Kawt Che 27
- (2) Htone Gyi 30 1/4
- (3) Kyauk Tan 34/1
- (4) Tar Wa 38 1/4
- (5) Payathonzu 42 1/2
- (6) Pegu (Bago) 46 1/2 (Junction to Mawlamyine and Spur Line to (36) Hanthawaddy Airport (Project suspended))
- (7) Shwe Hlay 51 3/4
- (8) Shwe Tan 53 1/2
- (9) Hpa Ya Gyi 57
- (10) Hpa Ya Ka Lay 59 1/4
- (11) Wan Be Inn -
- (12) Pyin Pon 64 3/4
- (13) Kyaik Sa Kaw 68
- (14) Ka Toke 71
- (15) Phaung Daw The 75 3/4
- (16) Daik-U 81 1/4
- (17) Pyun Ta Sa 87 3/4
- (18) Nga Dat Kyi 90 1/4
- (19) Nyaung Le Bin 92 3/4 (Junction to Madauk 109)
- (20) Taw Wi 97 1/2
- (21) Pein Za Loke 100 3/4
- (22) Thu Htay Kone 106
- (23) Kyauk Ta Ka 108 3/4
- (24) Yin Taik Kone 111 1/2
- (25) Pe Nwe Gon 114 1/4
- (26) Taw Kywe Inn 119
- (27) Ka Nyut Kwin 123 3/4
- (28) Nyaung Pin Thar 128 1/2
- (29) Phyu 134 1/4
- (30) Zay Ya Wa Di 138 1/4
- (31) Nyaung Chay Htauk 143 1/4
- (32) Kywe Pwe 149 1/4
- (33) Bant Bway Kone 152 3/4
- (34) Ok Twin 158 1/4
- (35) Thaung Taing Kone 161 3/4
- 163/24

- Taungoo 166 (Division 5)

=== Nyaunglebin - Madauk Branch Line ===
- (19) Nyaunglebin 92 3/4
- (37) Pu Zun Myaung 96 3/4
- (38) Inn Waing 100 1/2
- (39) Sa Hkan Tha -
- (40) Madauk 109

=== Yangon–Mawlamyine Railway ===
- (6) Pegu(Bago) 46 1/2
- (41) Ka Lay 49 1/4
- (42) Shan Ywar Gyi 52 1/2
- (43) Naung Pat Ta Yar 56 1/2
- (44) Kyaik Hla 59 1/2
- (45) Waw 63 1/2
- (46) Ka Thi Win -
- (47) Ah Byar 70 1/2 (Branch Line to (49) Nyaung Ka She 76/6 )
- (48) Sat Thwar Chon 73 3/4
- Sittaung River Bridge 77/19 (to Division 8)

- Oak Kan 56 1/2 (Division 7)

=== Yangon-Pyay Line ===
- Bago Region 60/12
- (50) Nga Hpyu Ka Lay 61 1/2
- (51) Thonze 65 3/4
- (52) Thonze Myoma 66 1/4
- (53) Thayarwady 68 3/4
- (54) Inn Ywar 73
- (55) Chin Thayt Kone 74 3/4
- (56) Letpadan 77 1/4 (Junction to Tharawaw 100 3/4)
- (57) Wet Hla Ka Lay 81 1/2
- (58) Wet Hla Ka Lay Ywar Ma 83
- (59) Sit Kwin 85
- (60) Sin Aing 88 3/4
- (61) Minhla 91 1/4
- (62) Oe Thei Kone 95 1/2
- (63) Okpho Ma Gyi Pin 99
- (64) Okpho 101 1/2
- (65) Thin Pan Kone 104
- (66) Gyobingauk 109
- (67) Hkunhni Ywa 111 1/2
- (68) Zigon 116
- (69) Nattalin 124
- (70) Paungde 129 1/2
- (71) Taung Boet Hla 133
- (72) Launt Gyi 133 1/4
- (73) Pu Tee Kone 136
- (74) Thea Kyaw 138
- (75) Thegon 141 1/4
- (76) Oe Tin Kone 144 1/2
- (77) Sin Mi Zwe 149 1/4
- (78) Ywa Tha Gon 152 1/4
- (79) Hmaw Za 155 3/4 (Junction to Aunglan-Taungdwingyi and Nay Pyi Taw)
- (80) Ngagattaya 158 1/4
- (81) Pyay 161

=== Pyay-Aunglan Line ===
- (78) Hmaw Za 155 3/4 (Junction to Pyay)
- (82) Shwe Ti Hka 157 /21
- (83) Ti Tut 164/0
- Magway Region 175/12 (Division 11)

=== Letpadan-Tharawaw Branch Line ===
- (56) Letpadan 77 1/4
- (84) Nyaung Waing 81 3/4
- (85) Kyauk Aing 84 1/2
- (86) Kha Mon Seik 87
- (87) Than Byu Yon 94
- (88) Ka Nyin To 94 3/4
- (89) Zee Hpyu Kone 95 1/2
- (90) Zee Hpyu Kone Ywa Mar 96 3/4
- (91) Tharawaw 100 3/4 <--Ferry--> Hinthada 109 1/2 (Division 9)

== Division 7 Yangon (Central) ==
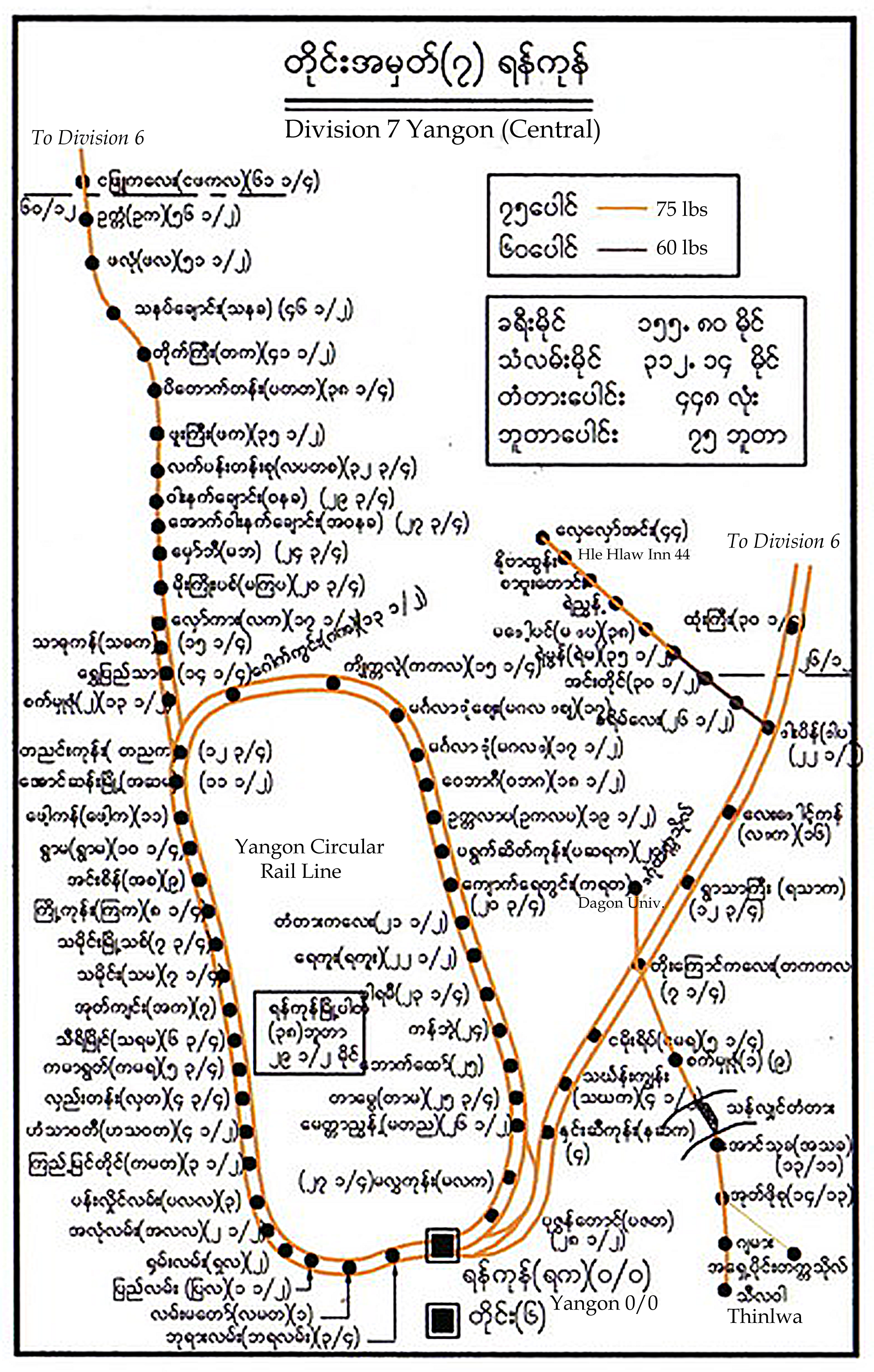
Myanmar Railways station map Division 7 Yangon

- Mileage: 155.80 miles (250.74 km)
- Rail Track: 312.14 miles (502.34 km)
- Bridges 448 Bridges
- Stations 75 Stations

=== Yangon Circular Rail Line ===
38 Stations, 29.5 miles (47.5 km)

- (1) Yangon 0/0
- (2) Hpaya Lan (Pagoda Road) 3/4
- (3) Lan Ma Daw 1
- (4) Pyay Lan (Pyay Road) 1 1/2
- (5) Shan Lan (Shan Road) 2
- (6) Ah Lone Lan (Ahlone Road) 2 1/2
- (7) Pan Hlaing Lan (Pan Hlaing Road) 3
- (8) Kye Maing Daing (Kemmendine) 3 1/2
- (9) Hanthawaddy 4 1/2
- (10) Hletan 4 3/4
- (11) Kamayut 5 3/4
- (12) Thi Ri Myaing 6 3/4
- (13) Ok Kyin 7
- (14) Tha Maing 7 1/4
- (15) Tha Maing Myo Thit 7 3/4
- (16) Gyo Gon 8 1/4
- (17) Insein 9
- (18) Ywa Ma 10 1/4
- (19) Hpaw Kan 11
- (20) Aung San Myo 11 1/2
- (21) Da Nyin Gon 12 3/4 (Junction to Pyay)
- (22) Gaw Gwin (Golf Course) 13 1/2
- (23) Kyaik Ka Le 15 1/4
- (24) Min Ga La Don Zei (Mingaladon Bazaar) 17
- (25) Min Ga La Don 17 1/2
- (26) We Ba Gee 18 1/2
- (27) Ok Ka La Pa 19 1/2
- (28) Pa Ywet Seik Kon 20
- (29) Kyauk Ye Dwin 20 3/4
- (30) Ta Da Ka Le 21 1/2
- (31) Ye Gu 22 1/2
- (32) Par Ya Mee 23 1/4
- (33) Kan Be 24
- (34) Bauk Taw 25
- (35) Ta Mwe 25 3/4
- (36) Myit Ta Na Yunt 26 1/2
- (37) Mah Lwa Gon 27 1/4
- (38) Pa Zun Daung 28 1/2
- (1) Yangon 29 1/2

=== Yangon-Mandalay Line ===
- (1) Yangon 0/0
- (39) Hnin Zi Gon 4
- (40) Thin Gan Gyun 4 1/2
- (41) Nga Moe Yeik 5 1/4
- (42) Toe Gyaung Ga Lay 7 1/4 (Junction to Thilwa and Dagon University)
- (43) Ywa Tha Gyi 12 3/4
- (44) Lay Daung Kan 16
- (45) Dar Bein 22 1/2 (Branch Line to Hlehlaw-In 44)
- 26/12

- Ton Gyi 30 1/4 (Division 6)

=== Dagon University Line ===
4.96 miles (7.98 km), opened in 2006

- (42) Togyaunggalay 7 1/4
- (46) Dagon University 12.21

=== Thilawa Port Line (Syriam) ===
- (42) Togyaunggalay 7 1/4
- (47) Industrial Estate (Zone 1) 9
- Thanlyin Bridge
- (48) Aung Thu Kha 13/11
- (49) Oak Po Su 14/13 Branch Line to (52) University of East Yangon (opened in 2006)
- (50) Ja Ma -
- (51) Thilawa -

=== Hlehlaw-In Line ===
- (45) Dar Pein 22 1/2
- (53) Yee Lay 25 1/2
- (54) In Taing 30 1/2
- (55) Ye Mwan 35 1/2
- (56) Ma Daw Pin 38
- (57) Ye Twin -
- (58) Sa Pu Taung -
- (59) Na Pa Htun -
- (60) Hlehlaw-In 44

=== Yangon-Pyay Line ===
- (21) Da Nyin Gon 12 3/4 (Junction for Yangon Circular Rail Line)
- (61) Industrial Zone (Sehmu Zone) 13 1/2
- (62) Shwe Pyi Tha 14 1/4
- (63) Tha Du Kan 15 1/4
- (64) Hlaw Ga 17 1/2 (Spur Line to Computer University)
- (65) Mo Gyoe Pyit 20 3/4
- (66) Hmaw Bi 24 3/4
- (67) Auk Wa Net Chaung 27 3/4
- (68) Wa Net Chaung 29 3/4
- (69) Let Pa Dan Su 32 3/4
- (70) Phu Gyi 35 1/2
- (71) Pa Tauk Tan 38 1/4
- (72) Taik Kyi 41 1/2
- (73) Tha Nat Chaung 46 1/2
- (74) Pa Lon 51 1/2
- (75) Oak Kan 56 1/2
- Bago Region 60/12

- Nga Hpyu Ka Lay 61 1/4 (Division 6)

== Division 8 Mawlamyine ==
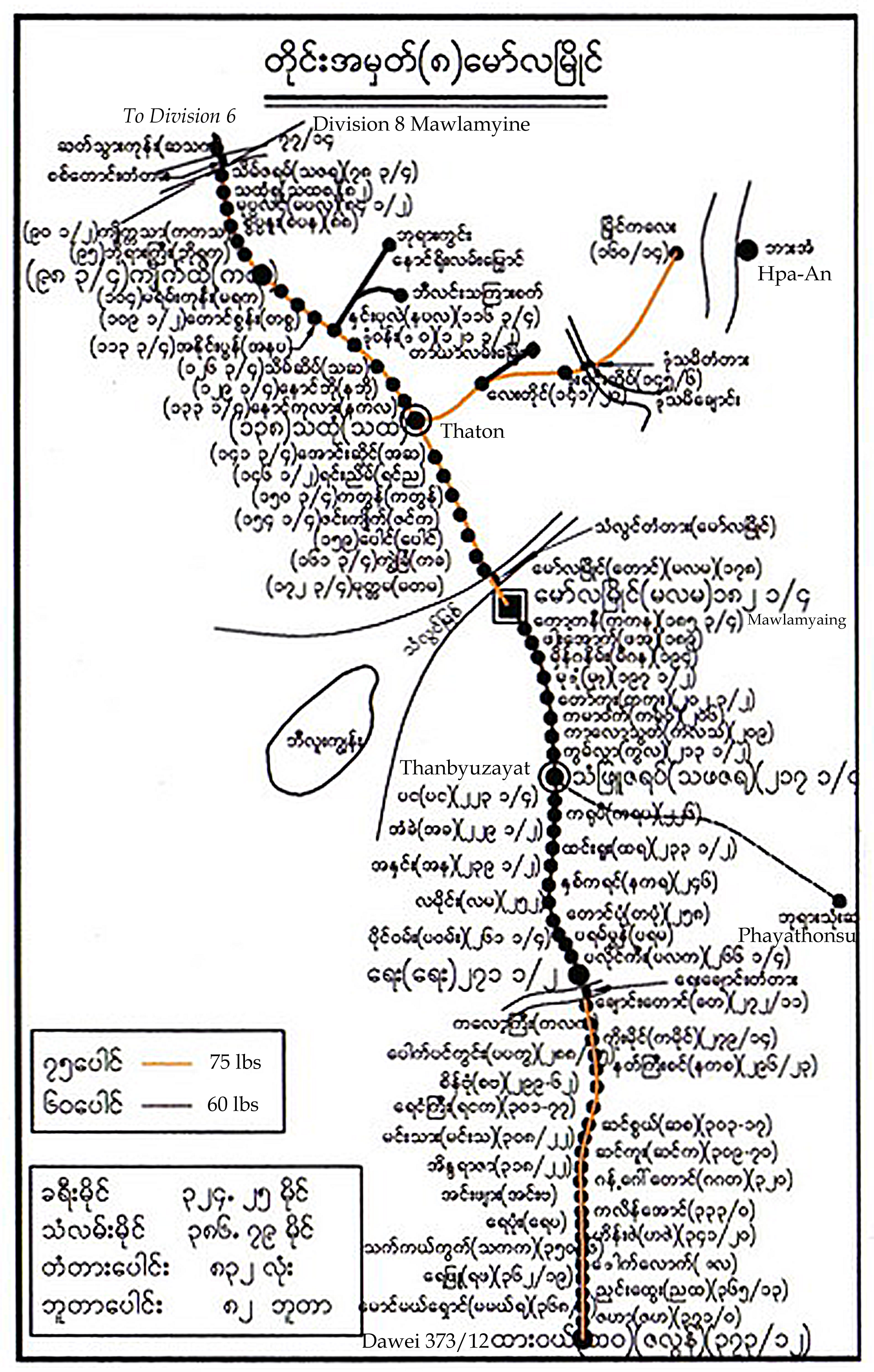
Myanmar Railways station map Division 8 Mawlamyine

- Mileage: 324.25 miles (521.83 km)
- Railway Track: 386.75 miles (622.41 km)
- Bridges 832
- Stations 82 (only 72 shown on the map)

Sat Thwar Chon 73 3/4 (Division 6)

=== Yangon–Mawlamyine Railway ===
- Sittaung River Bridge 77/19
- (1) Thein Za Yat 78 3/4
- (2) Tha Hton Su 82
- (3) Moke Pa Lin 84 1/2
- (4) Sut Pa Nu 88
- (5) Kyaik Ka Tha 90 1/2
- (6) Bo Yar Gyi 95
- (7) Kyaikto 98 3/4
- (8) Ma Yan Kone 104
- (9) Taung Sun 105 1/2
- (10) Ah Naing Pun 113 3/4
- (11) Hnin Pale 116 3/4 --> Spur Line to Phaya Kwin (abandoned ?) and Bilin Sugar mill
- (12) Don Wun 121 1/2
- (13) Thein Seik 126 3/4
- (14) Naung Bo 129 1/4
- (15) Naung Ku Lar 133 1/4
- (16) Thaton 138 (Junction to Myaing Ka Lay, Hpa-An)
- (17) Aung Saing 141 3/4
- (18) Yin Nyein 146 1/2
- (19) Ka Tun 150 3/4
- (20) Zin Kyaik 154 1/4
- (21) Paung 159
- (22) Kyway Gyan 161 3/4
- (23) Moke Ta Ma 172 3/4
- Thanlwin River Bridge (Mawlamyaing Bridge)
- (25) Mawlamyaing 182 1/4

=== Tanintharyi Line ===
- (24) Mawlamyaing (Old Station) 178
- (25) Mawlamyaing 182 1/4
- (26) Kawt Kha Ni 185 3/4
- (27) Hpar Auk 189
- (28) Hmein Ga Nein 194
- (29) Mudon 197 1/2
- (30) Taw Ku 202 1/2
- (31) Ka Mar Wet 206
- (32) Ka Lawt Thawt 209
- (33) Kun Hlar 213 1/2
- (34) Thanbyuzayat 217 1/4 (Junction to Payathonzu)
- (35) Pa Nga 223 1/4
- (36) Ka Yoke Pi 226
- (37) An Khe 229 1/2
- (38) Htin Shu 233 1/2
- (39) Ah Nin 239 1/2
- (40) Hnit Kayin 246
- (41) Lamaing 252
- (42) Taung Bon 258
- (43) Paing Wan 261 1/4
- (44) Pa Yan Maw -
- (45) Pa Laing Kee 266 1/4
- (46) Ye 271 1/2
- Ye River Bridge
- (47) Chaung Taung 272/11 (with very small ? Ø 20 feet turntable)
- (48) Kalawt Kyi -
- (49) Koe Maing 279/19
- (50) Pauk Pin Kwin 288/5
- (51) Nat Kyi Zin 296/23
- (52) Sein Bon 299.62
- (53) Yae Ngan Gyi 301.77
- (54) Sin Swei 303.17
- (55) Min Tha 308/22
- (56) Hsin Ku 309.70
- (57) Ein Da Ra Za 318/22
- (58) Gan Gaw Taung 320
- (59) In Hpya -
- (60) Kalein-Aung 333/0
- (61) Yae Pone -
- (62) Hein Ze 341/20
- (63) Tha Ke Kwa 350/6
- (64) Dauk Lauk -
- (65) Yebyu 362/19
- (66) Nyin Htway 365/13
- (67) Maung Mei Shaung 368/?
- (68) Za Har 371/0
- (69) Dawei 373/12

=== Hpa-An Branch Line ===
- (16) Thaton 138
- (70) Lay Taing 141/20 (Spur Line to Tyre Plant)
- (71) Du Yin Seik 145/6
- Don Tha Mi River Bridge
- (72) Myaing Ka Lay (Hpa-An) 160/14

== Division 9 Hinthada ==
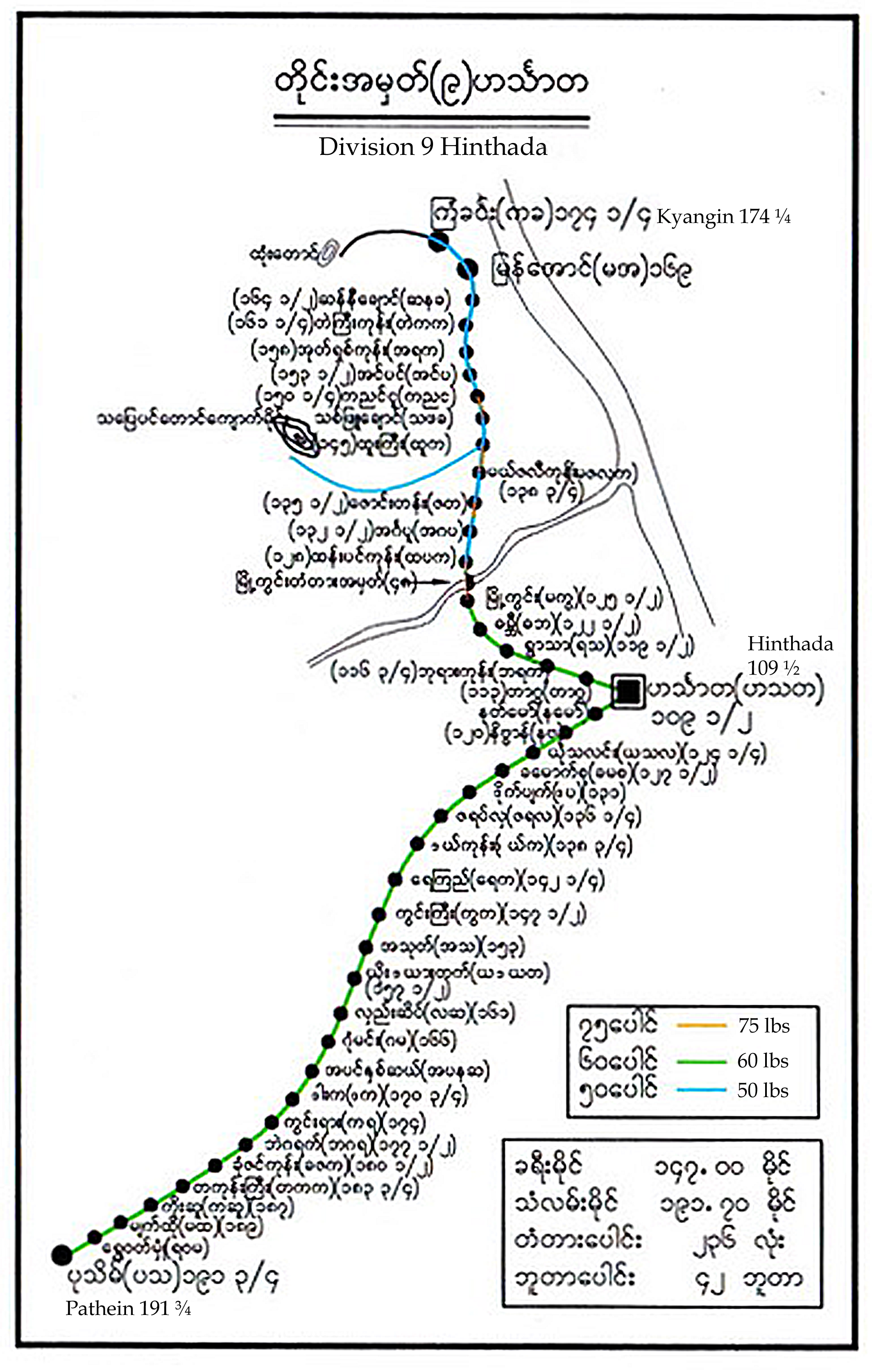
Myanmar Railways station map Division 9 Hinthada

- Mileage: 147.00 miles (236.57 km)
- Rail Track: 191.70 miles (308.51 km)
- Bridges 236 Bridges
- Stations 42 Stations

=== Kyangin-Hinthada-Pathein Line ===
- (1) Kyangin 174 1/4 Spur Line to Limestone Quarry -
- (2) Myan Aung 169
- (3) San Ni Chaung 164 1/4
- (4) Te Gyi Kone 161 1/4
- (5) Tha Yet Kone 158
- (6) In Pin 153 1/2
- (7) Ka Nyin Ngu 150 1/4
- (8) Ta Bye Gwin -
- (9) Htu Gyi 145 Spur Line to Mt.Tha Pyay Pin Quarry
- (10) Me Za Li Gon 138 3/4
- (11) Zaung Dan 135 1/2
- (12) Ingabu 132 1/2
- (13) Ta Bin Gon 128
- Myo Kwin Bridge No.48
- (14) Myo Kwin 125 1/2
- (15) Dan Bi 122 1/2
- (16) Ywa Thar 119 1/2
- (17) Hpa Ya Kone 116 3/4
- (18) Tar Gwa 113
- (19) Hinthada 109 1/2 (miles from Yangon) <--Ferry--> Tharawaw 100 3/4 (Division 6)
- (20) Nat Maw -
- (21) Neik Ban 120
- (22) Yon Tha Lin 124 1/4
- (23) Ka Mauk Su 127 1/2
- (24) Daik Pyet 131
- (25) Za Yat Hla 136 1/4
- (26) Ze Kone 138 3/4
- (27) Ye Gyi 142 1/4
- (28) Kwin Gyi 147 1/2
- (29) Ah Thok 153
- (30) Yo Da Ya Det 157 1/2
- (31) Hle Seik 161
- (32) Gon Min 166
- (33) Apin Hni Hse (Milestone 20) -
- (34) Dar Ka 170 3/4
- (35) Kwin Yar 174
- (36) Be Ga Yet 177 1/2
- (37) Khon Zin Kone 180 1/2
- (38) Ta Kone Gyi 183 3/4
- (39) Koe Su 187
- (40) Myat Toe 189
- (41) Shwe Wut Hmoe -
- (42) Pathein 191 3/4

== Division 10 Pakokku ==
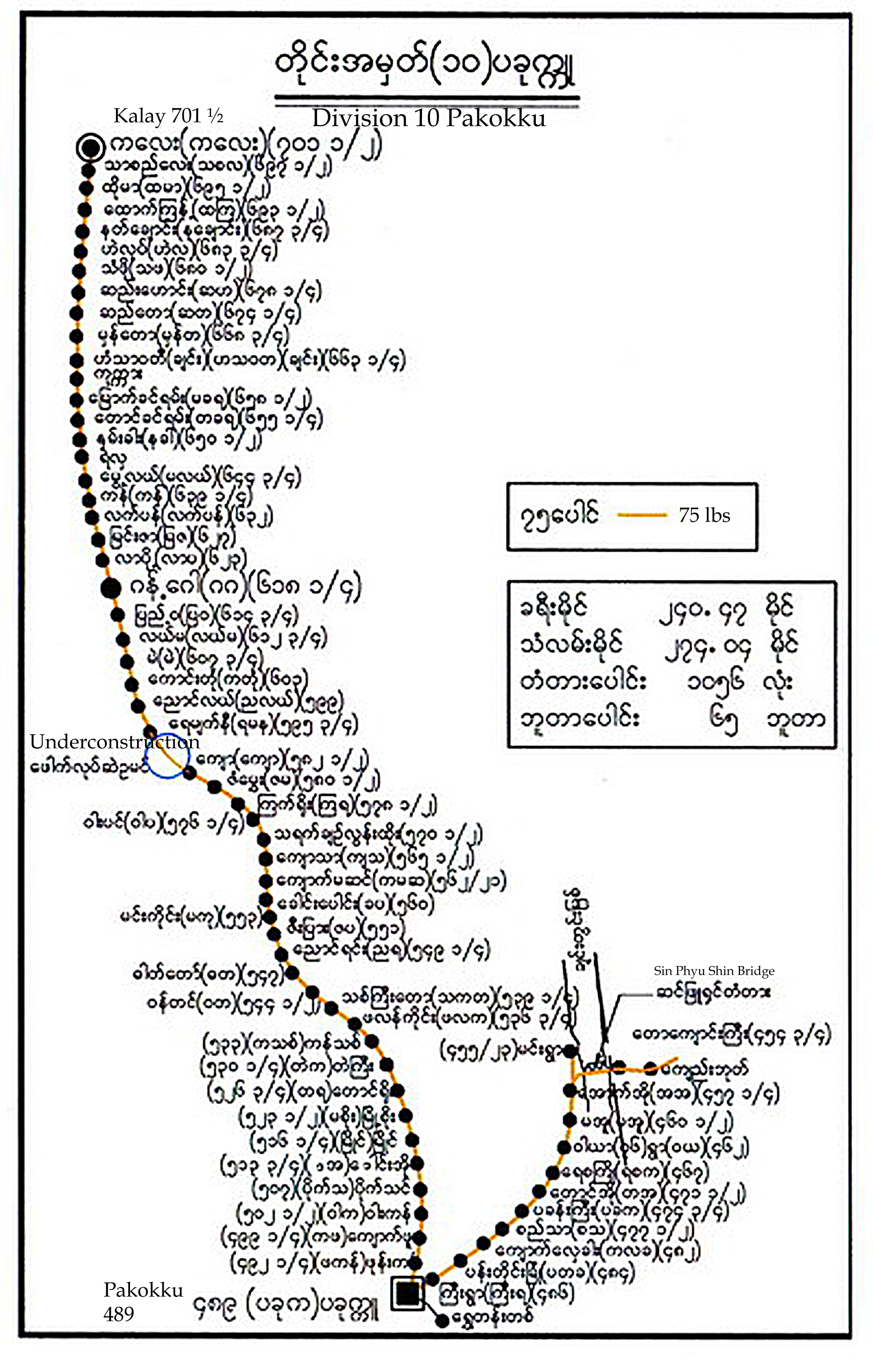
Myanmar Railways station map Division 10 Pakokku

- Mileage: 240.47 miles (387.00 km)
- Railway Track: 274.04 miles (441.02 km)
- Bridges 1026 bridges
- Stations 65 Stations
- Ma Gyi Bok - (Division 2)
- Taw Gyaung Gyi 454 3/4

=== Pakokku-Kalay Line ===
Sin Phyu Shin Bridge (Chindwin River)

- (1) Auk Oh 457 Spur Line to (2) Min Ywa 455/23
- (3) Ma Au 460 1/2
- (4) War Yar 76-Ywa 462
- (5) Ye Sa Gyo 467
- (6) Taung Oh 471 1/2
- (7) Pa Khan Gyi 474 3/4
- (8) Si Thar 477 1/2
- (9) Kyauk Hle Ga 482
- (10) Pa Daing Chon 484
- (11) Kyee Ywa 486
- (12) Pakokku 489 Spur Line to (13) Shwe Tan Tit
- (14) Hpone Kan 492 1/4
- (15) Kyauk Hpu 499 1/4
- (16) War Kan 502 1/2
- (17) Paik Thin 507
- (18) Daung Oh 513 3/4
- (19) Myaing 516 1/4
- (20) Myo Soe 523 1/2
- (21) Taung Yoe 526 3/4
- (22) Te Gyi 530 1/4
- (23) Kan Thit 533
- (24) Hpa Lan Kaing 536 3/4
- (25) Thit Kyi Taw 539 1/4
- (26) Wun Tin 544 1/2
- (27) Dat Taw 547
- (28) Nyaung Yin 549 1/4
- (29) Zee Pyar 551
- (30) Min Kaing 553
- (31) Gaung Paung 560
- (32) Kyauk Ka Sin 562/21
- (33) Kyaw Thar 565 1/2
- (34) Tha Yet Chin Lwin Hto 570 1/2
- (35) War Pin 576 1/4
- (36) Kyet Yoe 578 1/2
- (37) Zan Hmway 580 1/2
- (38) Kyaw 582 1/2

Railroad under construction

- (39) Yae Myet Ni 595 3/4
- (40) Nyaung Lel 599
- (41) Gaung Ton 603
- (42) Me 607 3/4
- (43) Lel Ma 612 3/4
- (44) Pyit Ma 614 3/4
- (45) Gan Gaw 618 1/4
- (46) Lar Boet 623
- (47) Myin Zar 627
- (48) Let Pan 632
- (49) Kan 639 1/4
- (50) Mwayt Lel 644 3/4
- (51) Ye Hla -
- (52) Hnan Khar 650 1/2
- (53) Taung Khin Yan 655 1/4
- (54) Myauk Khin Yan 658 1/2
- (55) Koke Kar -
- (56) Han Thar Wa Di (Chin) 663 1/4
- (57) Man Taw 668 3/4
- (58) Se Taw 674 1/4
- (59) Si Haung 678 1/4
- (60) Than Bo 680 1/2
- (61) He Loke 683 3/4
- (62) Nat Chaung 687 3/4
- (63) Htauk Kyant 693 1/2
- (64) Hto Mar 695 1/2
- (65) Thar Si Le 697 1/2
- (66) Kalay 701 1/2

== Division 11 Bagan ==
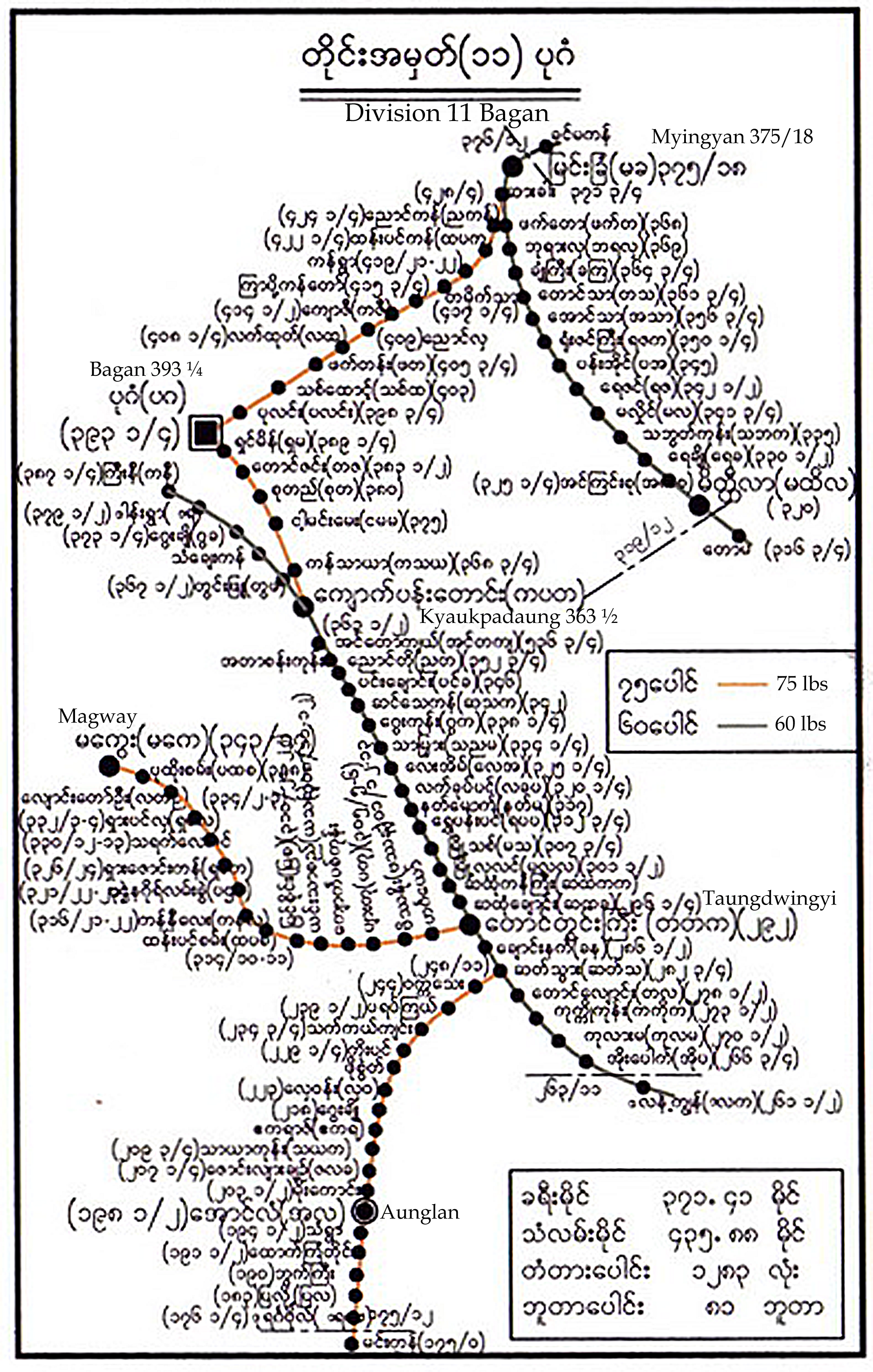
Myanmar Railways station map Division 11 Bagan

- Mileage: 371.41 miles (597.73 km)
- Railway Track: 435.88 miles (701.48 km)
- Bridges 1,283 Bridges
- Stations 81 Stations (91 stations shown on map)

- Min Kan 175/0 (Division 6)

=== Aunglan Line ===
opened 1999

- (1) Da Yin Da Bo 175/12
- (2) Pya Loet 183
- (3) Bwet Kyi 190
- (4) Htauk Kyant Taing 191 1/2
- (5) Than Ywa 193 1/2
- (6) Aung Lan 198 1/2
- (7) Moe Kaung 203 1/2
- (8) Zaung Lya Chin 207 1/4
- (9) Tha Ya Gon 209 3/4
- (10) Aye Ka Rit -
- (11) Gway Cho 218
- (12) Hlay Wun 223
- (13) Hpo Sut -
- (14) Koe Pin 229 1/4
- (15) Thet Kei Kyin 234 3/4
- (16) Pa Yet Kye 239 1/2
- (17) Wet Ka The 244
- (18) Sat Thwar Junction (at 248/11)

- Da Lant Chun 261 1/2 (Division 5)

=== Taungdwingyi-Bagan Line ===
- (19) Oe Pauk 266 3/4
- (20) Ku Lar Ma 270 1/2
- (21) Koke Ko Kone 273 1/2
- (22) Taung Lyaung 278 1/2
- (18) Sat Thwar 282 3/4 (Junction to Aunglan-Pyay)
- (23) Chaung Net 285 1/2
- (24) Taung Dwin Gyi 292 (Junction to Magway)
- (25) Sa Don Chaung 296 1/4
- (26) Sa Don Gon Kyi -
- (27) Myo Lu Lin 301 1/2
- (28) Myo Thit 307 3/4
- (29) Shwe Pan Pin 312 3/4
- (30) Nat Mauk 317
- (31) Let Khoke Pin 320 1/4
- (32) Lay Ein 325 1/4
- (33) Thar Hmya 334 1/4
- (34) Gway Kone 338 1/4
- (35) Sin Thay Kan 342
- (36) Pin Chaung 346
- (37) Nyaung Hto 352 3/4
- (38) In Taw Kyei 356 3/4
- (39) Kyauk Pa Daung 363 1/2 (Junction to Kyee Ni)
- (40) Kan Tha Yar 368 3/4
- (41) Nga Min May 375
- (42) Su Ti 380
- (43) Taung Zin 383 1/2
- (44) Shin Mein 389 1/4
- (45) Bagan 393 1/4
- (46) Pu Lin 398 3/4
- (47) Thit Htaunt 403
- (48) Hpet Tan 405 3/4
- (49) Let Htoke 408 1/4
- (50) Nyaung Hla 409
- (51) Kyaw Zi 414 1/2
- (52) Kyar Poet Kan Daw 415 3/4
- (53) Ta Maik Tha 417 1/4
- (54) Kan Ywa 419/21-22
- (55) Ta Pin Kan 422 1/4
- (56) Nyaung Kan 424 1/4
- (57) Sar Khar Junction (at 428/4)

Taw Ma 316 3/4 (Division 4)

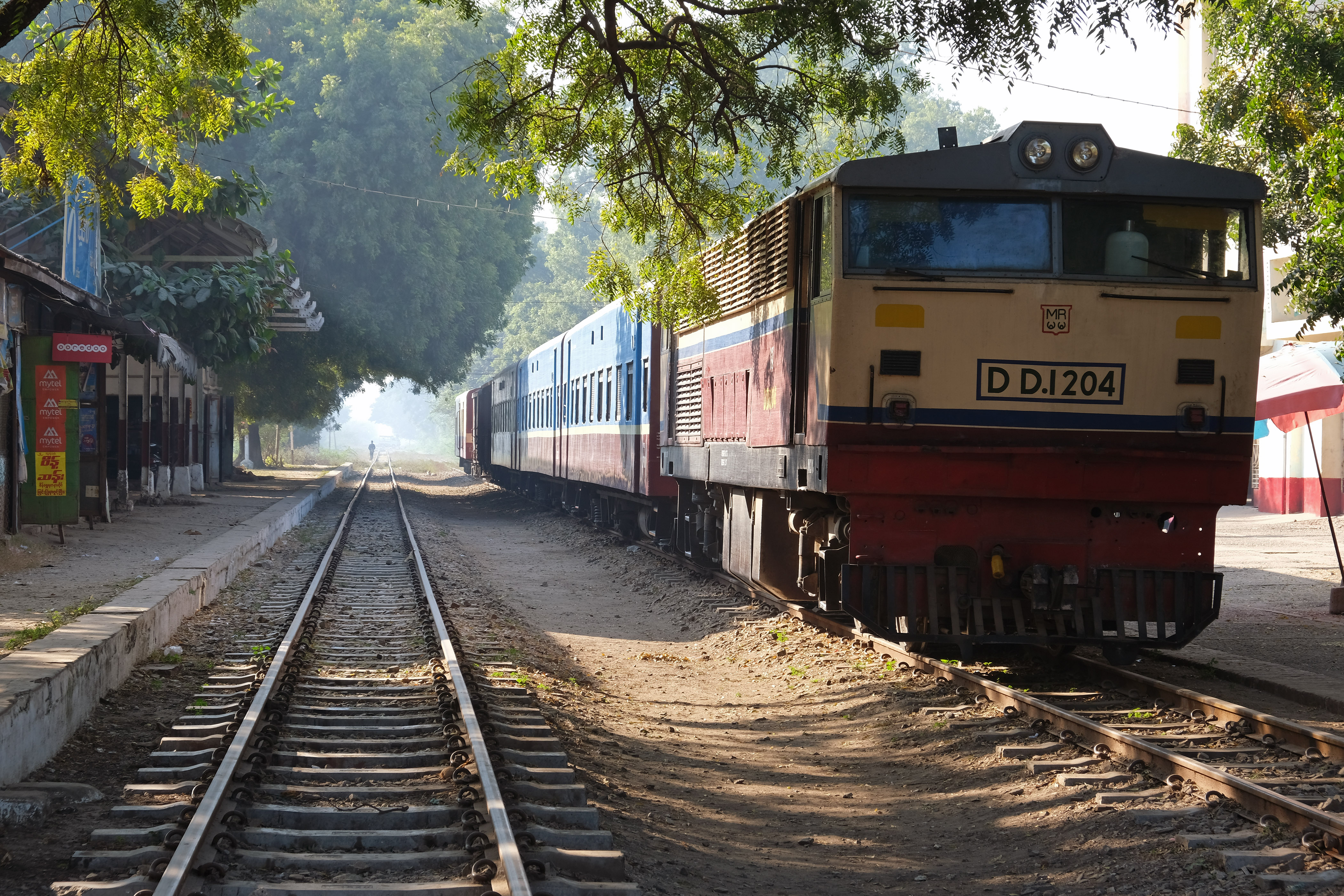
Myingyan Railway Station

=== Meiktila-Myingyan Line ===
- 319/12
- (58) Meik Ti La 320
- (59) In Gyin Su 325 1/4
- (60) Yae Cho 330 1/2
- (61) Tha But Kone 335
- (62) Ma Hlaing 341 3/4
- (63) Yae Zin 342 1/2
- (64) Pan Aing 345
- (65) Yon Sin Gyi 350 1/4
- (66) Aung Thar 356 3/4
- (67) Taung Tha 361 3/4
- (68) Chon Gyi 364 3/4
- (69) Hpa Yar Hla 366
- (70) Hpet Taw 368
- (57) Sar Khar 371 3/4 Junction to Bagan
- (71) Myin Gyan 375/18
- 376/12

- Kin Ma Gan - (Division 3)

=== Kyaukpadaung-Kyeeni Branch Line ===
- (39) Kyauk Pa Daung 363 1/2
- (72) Twin Hpyu 367 1/2
- (73) Than Chay Kan -
- (74) Gway Jo 373 1/4
- (75) Dan Ywa 379 1/2
- (76) Kyee Ni 387 1/4

=== Taungdwingyi-Magway Line ===
- (24) Taung Dwin Gyi 292
- (77) Hin Ga Yaw -
- (78) Bi Tha Noe 301/12-13
- (79) Pya Tu 305/5-6
- (80) Jau Pyi Kone (Quarry) -
- (81) Yin Nar Thar Si 308/11-12
- (82) Myin Sain 310/21-22
- (83) Than Pin San 314/10-11
- (84) Kan Ni Le 316/21-22
- (85) Nga Na Po Lan Gway 321/22-23
- (86) Shar Saung Kan 326/24
- (87) Tha Yet Lay Pin 330/12-13
- (88) Shar Pin Hla 332/3-4
- (89) Khaung Taw U 334/2-3
- (90) Pu Htoe San 338
- (91) Magway 343/17 Branch Line to Kanbya

=== Magway-Kanbya Line ===
8 miles completed 2011

- (91) Magway 343/17
- (--) TTC -
- (--) University of Medicine -
- (--) Kanbya -

== International ==
Work on the standard gauge line from Kunming, China to Kyaukphyu started in 2021, with a station at Mandalay. Work was resumed in 2023.

- (China) Kunming
- (China) Dali
- (China) Ruili
- (China) Baoshan
- (Myanmar) Muse
- (Myanmar) Mandalay
- (Myanmar) Lashio
- (Myanmar) Hsenwi
- (Myanmar) Kyaukphyu port

== See also ==
- Myanmar Railways
- Rail transport in Burma
- History of rail transport in Myanmar
- Yangon Circular Railway
