= Alam Udang Bum =

Catholic shrine in Kachin State, Myanmar

Coordinates: 25.562474°N 97.450928°E

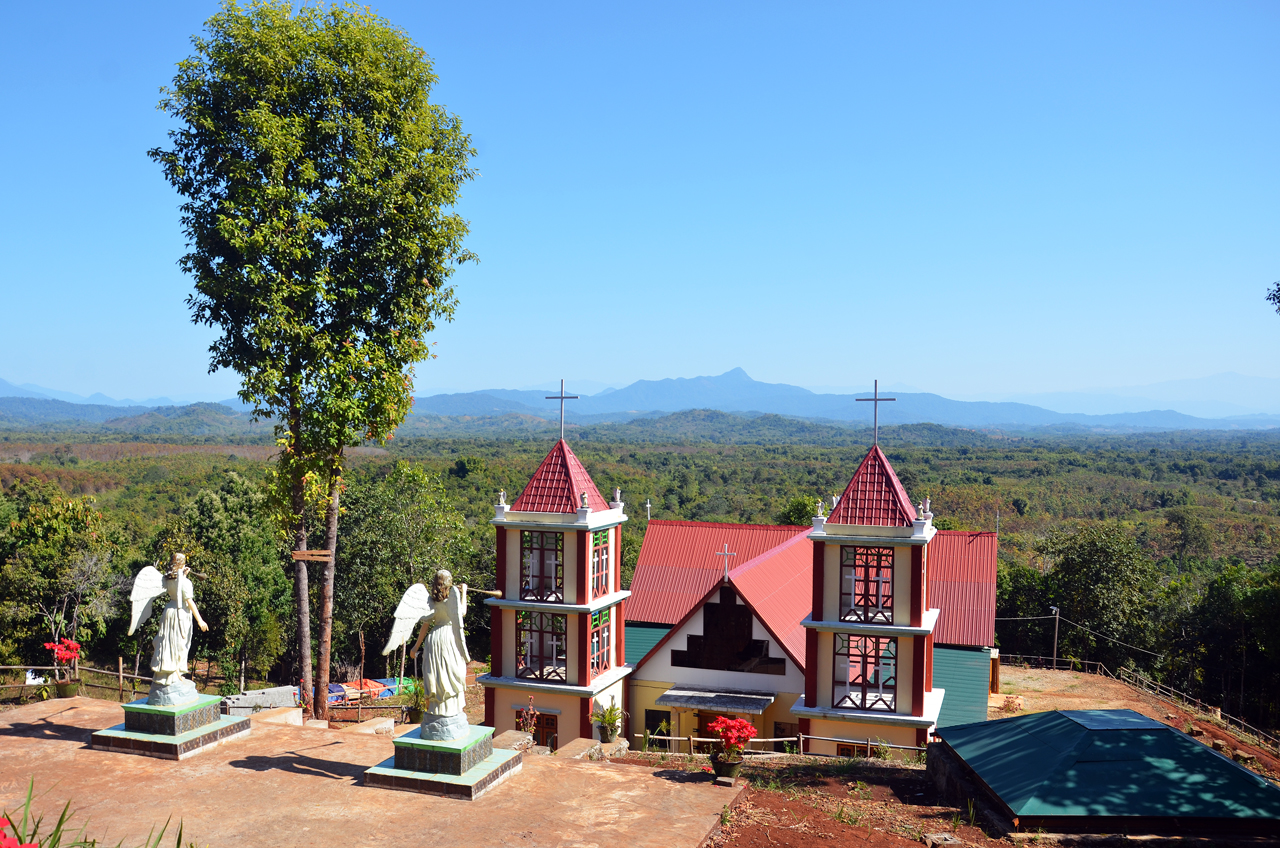
An eastward-facing image of a bamboo-framed Catholic church at the base of Alam Udang Bum in Myitkyina district, Kachin State, Myanmar.

Alam Udang Bum is a Christian Catholic religious monument and major pilgrimage site in located in Myitkyina district, Kachin State, Myanmar.

== Overview ==
Known in English as the "Holy Cross Mountain", the shrine of Alam Udang Bum can be accessed by road on foot, motorbike or car. The land is currently maintained by the Catholic Diocese of Myitkyina.

Situated west of the Jingpo village of Alam, the hilltop shrine is about 24 kilometres north of downtown Myitkyina. At the base of the mountain on the grounds of Alam Udang Bum is a bamboo church, visitation centre, and a grotto.

A festival feast is held atop Alam Udang Bum every September 14, a highly important date for visitors to the shrine.

Most literature about the Holy Cross Mountain is written in Burmese or Kachin language and is not officially available in English. Despite this supposed obscurity, many Irish missionaries have visited the shrine, and its existence is well-known to thousands of residents in Kachin State, according to Francis Daw Tang, Bishop of Myitkyina Diocese.

== History ==
Originally created in 1983, the Holy Cross Mountain was founded by a Kachin priest who petitioned the diocese for the creation of a pilgrimage site for Catholics atop the mountain in Alam.

One year later, in 1984, construction of the shrine officially began. Using only hand tools, a jeep from Beijing and limited manpower, the shrine was affixed with a large wooden cross, which stands to this day and is the subject of a number of local legends and the source of purported miracles.

According to claimed documents submitted to Kachin State's land registry in 2015, the official elevation of the site is 2,800 ft.

The road, which snakes up the slope of the mountain, was expanded between the years 1994 and 1995. In 2005 the diocese requested alms to be solicited so heavy equipment could be rented to widen the road to accommodate vehicles.

From the 1980s onwards until 2013, the mountain was ravaged by forest fires until Kachin state Parliament deemed the land environmentally protected. Presently, a number of warnings are placed on the side of the highway indicating it is forbidden for hunters to light fires at the base of the mountain.

On 14 August 2014, the Kachin State legislature and Myitkyina Diocese officially signed a memorandum of understanding indicating land ownership rights of Alam Udang Bum are possessed by the Catholic Diocese of Myitkyina for the purposes of owning and maintaining a green space.
