= Ywathagyi railway station =

Railway station in Yangon, Myanmar

Coordinates: 16.93108884398898°N 96.2649242880856°E

Ywathagyi railway station (Burmese: ရွာသာကြီးဘူတာ) is a railway station on the Yangon–Mandalay Railway in Yangon, Myanmar.
