= Naypyidaw Central railway station =

Railway station in Myanmar

Naypyidaw Station နေပြည်တော်ဘူတာ

General information
- Location: Naypyidaw; Myanmar
- Coordinates: 19°51′0″N 96°11′46″E
- System: Myanmar Railways
- Line: Yangon–Mandalay Railway

History
- Opened: July 5, 2009
Location

Naypyidaw Central railway station (Burmese: နေပြည်တော်ဘူတာ), located in Naypyidaw, is the largest rail station in Myanmar, encompassing 36,000 square feet (3,300 m^{2}) on 826 acres (334 ha) of land. The station was built at milepost No. 233/0, between the Ywadaw and Kyihtaunggan stations along the Yangon–Mandalay Railway. Construction began on 8 December 2006, and the station was inaugurated on 5 July 2009. Four hostels, built to accommodate overnight and early morning passengers are located north of the station.
