= Myitkyina railway station =

Railway station in Myitkyina, Myanmar

Myitkyina station မြစ်ကြီးနားဘူတာ
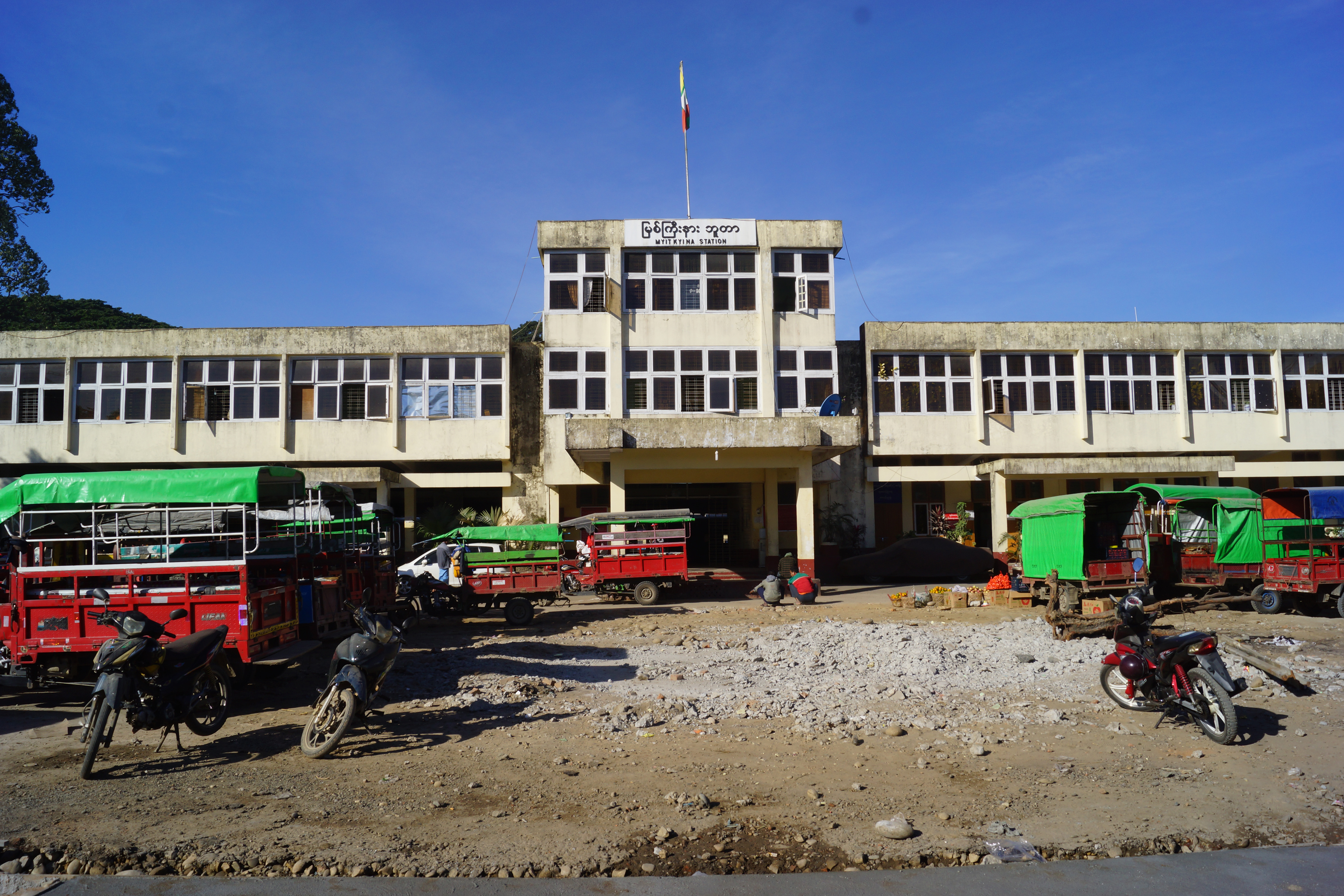
- Myitkyina railway station

General information
- Location: Myitkyina, Kachin State, Myanmar; Myanmar
- Coordinates: 25°22′53″N 97°23′54″E
- Transit authority: Myanma Railways
- Line: Mandalay–Myitkyina Railway

History
- Opened: 1898; 128 years ago
Location

Myitkyina station (Burmese: မြစ်ကြီးနားဘူတာ) is a railway station located in Myitkyina, Kachin State, Myanmar. This station was opened in 1898 as the terminus of the Mandalay–Myitkyina Railway.
