= Dagon University railway station =

Railway station in Yangon, Myanmar

Coordinates: 16.91287°N 96.22008°E

Dagon University railway station is a railway station in Yangon, Myanmar.
