= Mandalay–Myitkyina Railway =

Railway line in Myanmar

Mandalay–Myitkyina Railway မန္တလေး-မြစ်ကြီးနား ရထားလမ်း
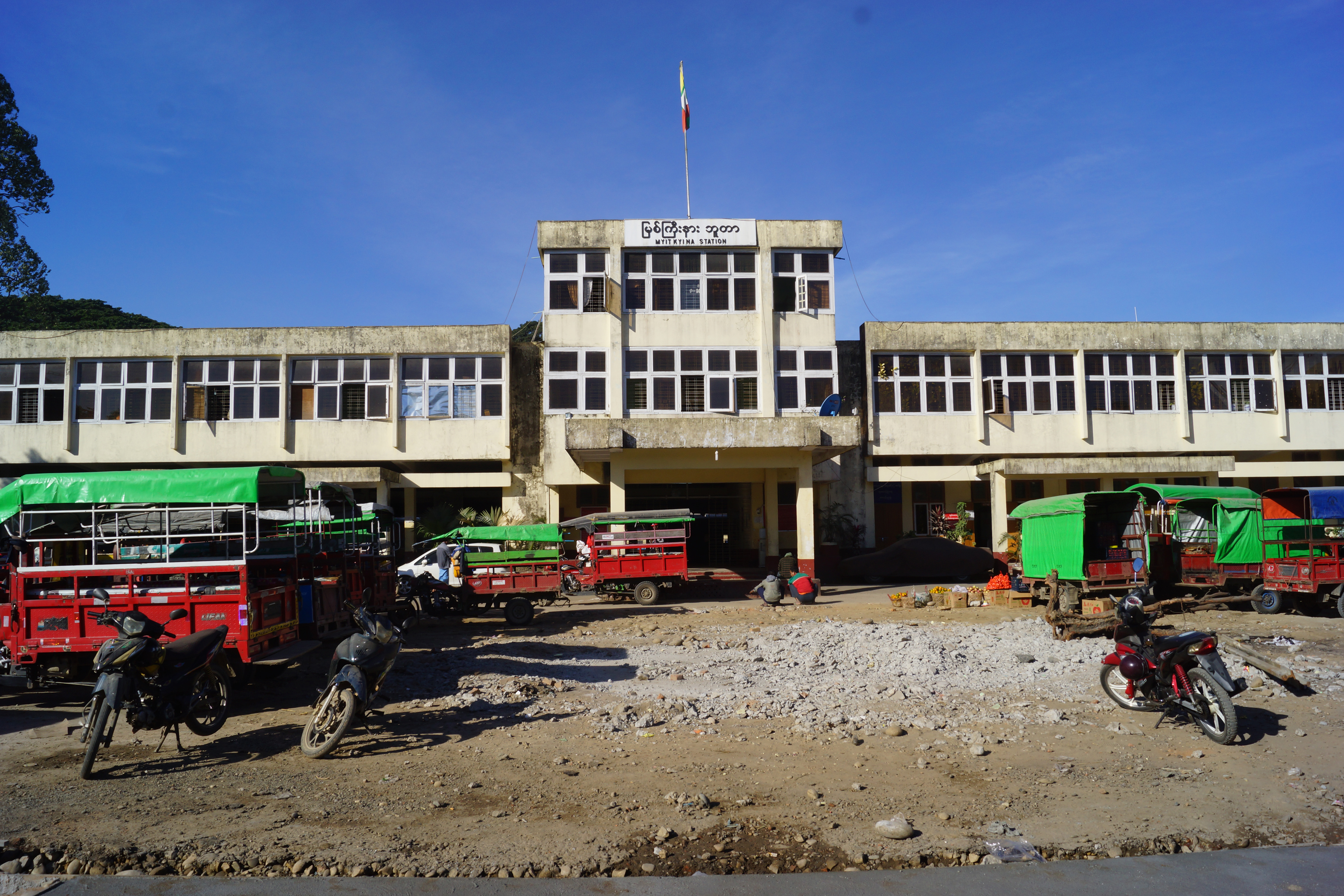

Overview
- Owner: Myanma Railways
- Locale: Mandalay Region, Sagaing Region, Kachin State

Operation
- Operator: Myanma Railways

Technical
- System length: 547.2 km (340.0 mi)
- Track gauge: 1,000 mm (3 ft 3 3/8 in)

Mandalay–Myitkyina Railway (Burmese: မန္တလေ-မြစ်ကြီးနား ရထားလမ်း) is a railway line in Myanmar and is operated by Myanma Railways.

== History ==
Established shortly after the British conquest of northern Myanmar, the Mandalay-Myitkyina Railway Line links the city of Myitkyina, situated on the banks of the Ayeyawaddy River in northern Myanmar, to the country's extensive railway network. The Mu Valley State Railway undertook the construction of this line, embarking on the project simultaneously from both the north and south. Utilizing the Ayeyawaddy River for transportation, the necessary materials and rolling stock were delivered to Myitkyina, paving the way for the inauguration of the line's initial segment between Myitkyina and Mogaung in 1890.

The railway was completed in 1898.

Prior to 1934, a ferry operated between Amarapura and Sagaing to bridge the gap between the northern segment of the Mandalay-Myitkyina Railway Line and the rest of the railway network. In 1934, the construction of the Ava Bridge marked a historic milestone as the first bridge across the Ayeyawaddy River in Myanmar. However, its role in connecting the isolated northern section (Sagaing to Myitkyina) with the rest of the network was short-lived. During World War II, the bridge was destroyed, necessitating the reinstatement of ferry services until its reconstruction.

Segment	length (mile)	Date opened
Sagaing Shore - Shwebo	55.69	July 1, 1891
Myohaung - Amarapura Shore	6.11	Nov 22, 1891
Shwebo-Wuntho	99.46	April 4, 1892
Mohnyin-Mogaung	52.34	March 1, 1896
Mogaung-Myitkyina	36.63	Jan 1,1898

== Stations ==
- Mandalay Central railway station
- Myitkyina railway station
