= Thilawa railway station =

Railway station in Yangon, Myanmar

Coordinates: 16°39′57″N 96°15′37″E

Thilawa railway station is a railway station in Yangon, Myanmar.
