= Yangon–Mandalay Railway =

Railway line in Myanmar

Yangon–Mandalay Railway ရန်ကုန်-မန္တလေး ရထားလမ်း
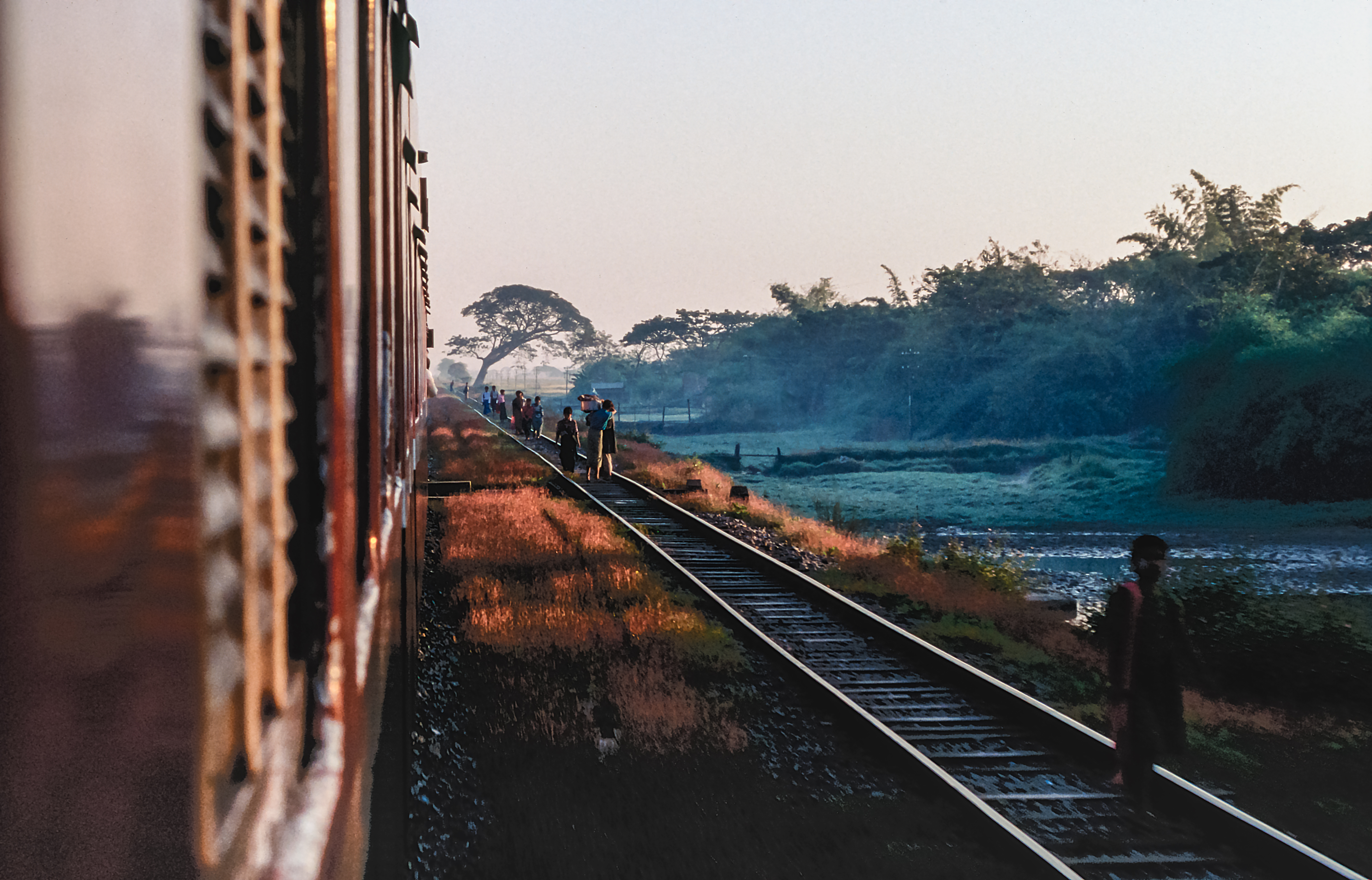

Overview
- Owner: Myanma Railways
- Locale: Yangon Region, Bago Region, Naypyidaw Union Territory, Mandalay Region
- Headquarters: Yangon

Operation
- Began operation: 1889
- Operator: Myanma Railways

Technical
- System length: 620.4 km (385.5 mi)
- Track gauge: 1,000 mm (3 ft 3 3/8 in)

Yangon–Mandalay Railway (Burmese: ရန်ကုန်-မန္တလေး ရထားလမ်း) is a railway line in Myanmar. Operated by Myanma Railways, it is the second railway line in Myanmar after the opening of the Irrawaddy Valley State Railway.

== History ==
In 1881, the government of Lower Myanmar decided to continue construction of the Yangon-Taungoo railway even after the British built the Yangon-Pyay railway. The section between Yangon and Nyaunglebin was opened on February 27, 1884, and that between Nyaunglebin - Taungoo was opened on July 1, 1885. After the occupation of Upper Burma by the British in 1885, the following sections of this line was extended to Mandalay in 1889.

In 1896, The Sittang Valley State Railway was merged with the Burma Railway Company.

Segment	length (km)	Date opened
Yangon - Bago	74.8	February 27, 1884
Bago - Nyaunglebin	74.5	August 10, 1884
Nyaunglebin - Taungoo	117.9	July 1, 1885
Taungoo - Pyinmana	94.9	October 1, 1888
Pyinmana - Mandalay	258.3	March 10, 1889

== Stations ==
- Yangon Central railway station
- Naypyidaw Central railway station
- Mandalay Central railway station
