= Myitkyina =

Capital city of Kachin State, Myanmar

Myitkyina မြစ်ကြီးနားမြို့ Myitkyina Muklum
- Capital Town
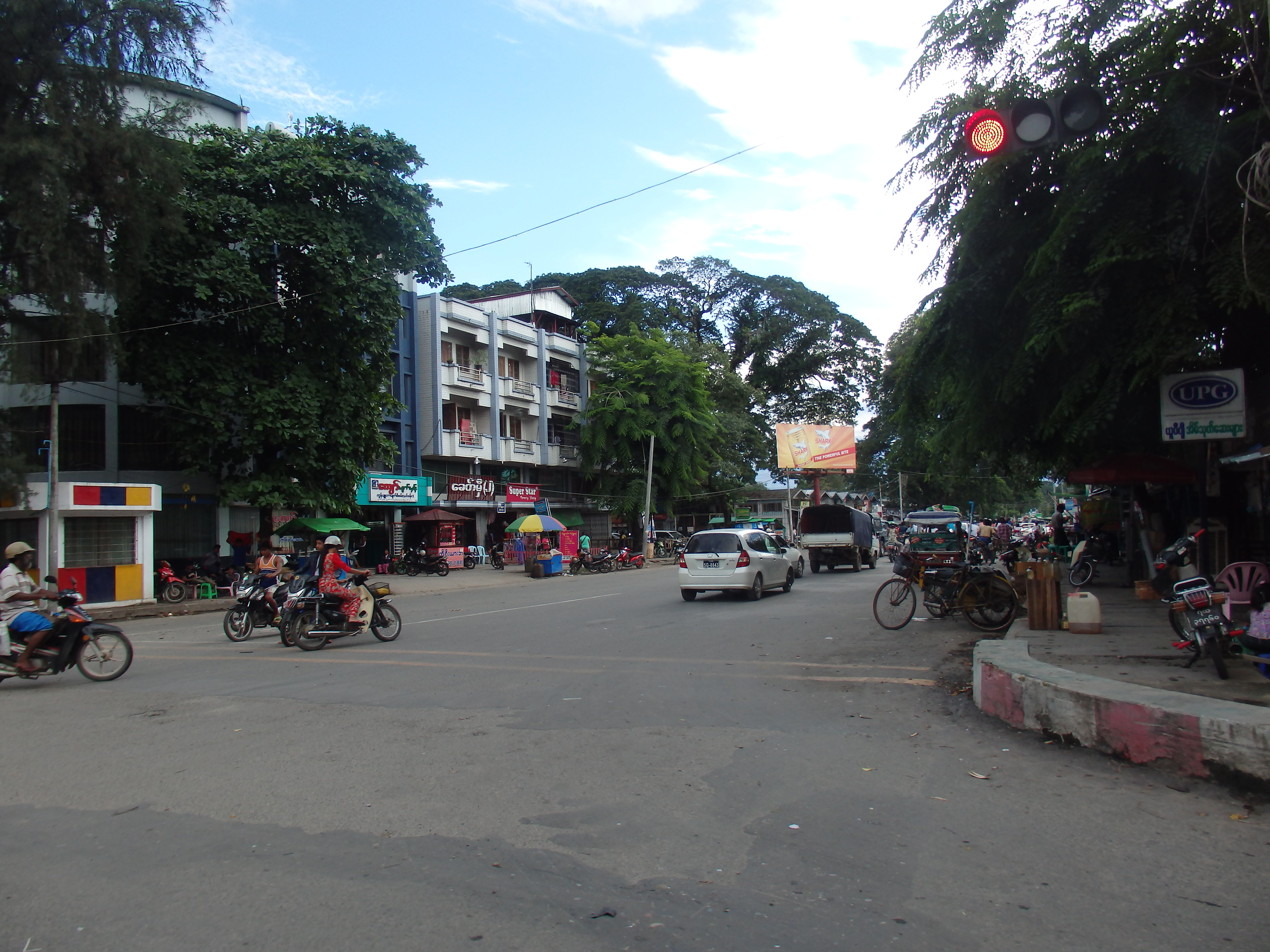

- Location in Myanmar (Burma)
- Coordinates: 25°23′12″N 97°23′38″E
- Country: Myanmar
- Division: Kachin State
- District: Myitkyina District
- Township: Myitkyina Township

Government
  - Mayor: Dr. Than Htay Aung (USDP)
- Elevation: 472 ft (144 m)

Population (2014)
  - Urban: 210,949
  - Ethnicities: Kachin; Gorkha (Nepali); Shan; Bamar; Chinese; Rakhine
  - Religions: Buddhism; Christianity
- Time zone: UTC+6.30 (MMT)
- Area code: 74
- Climate: Am/Aw/Cwa

Myitkyina (Burmese: မြစ်ကြီးနားမြို့, MLCTS: mrac kri: na: mrui., pronounced [mjɪʔtɕíná]; Jinghpaw: Myitkyina, [mjìtkjí̠ná]; Shan: ၸႄႈၼႃး) is the capital city of Kachin State in Myanmar (Burma), located 1,480 kilometers (920 mi) from Yangon, and 785 kilometers (488 mi) from Mandalay. In Burmese it means "near the big river", and Myitkyina is on the west bank of the Ayeyarwady River, just 40 kilometers (25 mi) downstream from Myit-son (Burmese for confluence) of its two headstreams (the Mali and N'mai rivers). It is the northernmost river port and railway terminus in Myanmar. The city is served by Myitkyina Airport.

== History ==
The area surrounding Myitkyina, including what is now Waingmaw, has been an important trading zone between China and Myanmar since ancient times. The nearby town of Katkyo, from the Shan Kat Kio (lit. 'Irrawaddy bazaar'), had its legendary founding in 1294 on the left (east) bank of the river. The region was then under the rule of Möng Kawng and other Shan states until the Konbaung dynasty, when it increasingly came under the control of Burmese and Kachin authorities.

American Baptist missionary George J. Geis and his wife arrived in Myitkyina in the late 1890s and in 1900 they requested permission to build a mansion in the town. Herman Tegenfeldt, a later Baptist missionary, built a church in his honor in the 1950s, naming it Geis Memorial Church. It is one of the Kachin Baptist Convention (KBC) churches in Myitkyina.

Japanese forces captured the town and nearby airbase during World War II in 1942. In August 1944, Myitkyina was recaptured by the Allied forces under General Joseph Stilwell after a prolonged siege and heavy fighting between Nationalist Chinese divisions, the Chindits, and Merrill's Marauders of the Northern Combat Area Command and the besieged elements of the 33rd Imperial Japanese Army under General Masaki Honda. The town was strategically important not only because of its rail and water links to the rest of Burma, but also because it was on the planned route of the Ledo Road.

== Climate ==
Myitkyina has a borderline tropical monsoon climate (Köppen Am) bordering upon both a tropical savanna climate (Aw) and a humid subtropical climate (Cwa). Temperatures are very warm throughout the year, although the winter months from December to February are milder. There is a winter dry season from November to April and a summer wet season from May to October.

Climate data for Myitkyina (1991–2020, extremes 2001-present)
Month	Jan	Feb	Mar	Apr	May	Jun	Jul	Aug	Sep	Oct	Nov	Dec	Year
Record high °C (°F)	30.0 (86.0)	33.9 (93.0)	38.0 (100.4)	40.0 (104.0)	41.8 (107.2)	40.5 (104.9)	38.3 (100.9)	38.0 (100.4)	38.4 (101.1)	37.5 (99.5)	33.3 (91.9)	30.0 (86.0)	41.8 (107.2)
Mean daily maximum °C (°F)	25.7 (78.3)	28.1 (82.6)	31.0 (87.8)	33.2 (91.8)	33.2 (91.8)	31.5 (88.7)	30.9 (87.6)	32.0 (89.6)	32.2 (90.0)	31.2 (88.2)	28.9 (84.0)	26.2 (79.2)	30.3 (86.5)
Daily mean °C (°F)	18.2 (64.8)	20.5 (68.9)	23.7 (74.7)	26.5 (79.7)	27.8 (82.0)	27.9 (82.2)	27.7 (81.9)	28.3 (82.9)	28.0 (82.4)	26.3 (79.3)	22.5 (72.5)	19.0 (66.2)	24.7 (76.5)
Mean daily minimum °C (°F)	10.6 (51.1)	13.0 (55.4)	16.4 (61.5)	19.8 (67.6)	22.4 (72.3)	24.2 (75.6)	24.4 (75.9)	24.6 (76.3)	23.9 (75.0)	21.4 (70.5)	16.1 (61.0)	11.8 (53.2)	19.0 (66.2)
Record low °C (°F)	6.2 (43.2)	8.0 (46.4)	11.0 (51.8)	14.3 (57.7)	16.2 (61.2)	19.4 (66.9)	19.2 (66.6)	20.6 (69.1)	19.3 (66.7)	15.0 (59.0)	8.2 (46.8)	7.0 (44.6)	6.2 (43.2)
Average precipitation mm (inches)	13.5 (0.53)	18.5 (0.73)	25.4 (1.00)	49.0 (1.93)	217.2 (8.55)	554.8 (21.84)	564.4 (22.22)	442.5 (17.42)	324.2 (12.76)	170.2 (6.70)	23.8 (0.94)	6.8 (0.27)	2,410.3 (94.89)
Average precipitation days (≥ 1.0 mm)	2.0	2.9	4.0	6.4	14.1	22.5	24.8	20.9	15.8	10.4	2.4	1.0	127.2
Average relative humidity (%)	77	68	64	64	72	83	89	87	85	83	79	78	77
Source 1: World Meteorological Organization, Norwegian Meteorological Institute (extremes 2001-2010)
Source 2: Deutscher Wetterdienst (humidity 1963–1988)

=== Air quality ===
The city residents dispose of the majority of their waste by burning it in small piles by the roadside. Most waste is disposed of in this way, including plastics. Almost every block in the city has a small fire every evening. Burning usually starts late afternoon, and by 6.00 pm the city air is often quite smoky. Burning can start earlier at the weekend. The air quality in Myitkyina in the evenings can be poor, which can make being outside unpleasant. Sometimes, due to atmospheric pressure, the air will still be smoky in the morning. The only time of year that this does not happen is during the monsoon season, when it is reported that the air is fresh.

== Population ==
The Kachin State Parliament building in Myitkyina

As the capital of the state, it has government offices and a greater population than other cities in the state. The city has a population of approximately 150,000, with a mix of Kachin, Shan, Bamar, Burmese Gorkha and some Chinese and Indians.

The Kachin language is the common language among the Kachin. Some people can speak English and Nepali, while the town's people mostly speak Burmese which is the national language of Myanmar.

Foreigners are now free to visit Myitkyina without prior government permission, although not advised due to a civil war ongoing currently as of February 2025.

=== Religion ===
Major religions are Theravada Buddhism, Christianity (Roman Catholic and Baptist are major denominations), and other religions such as animism and Islam.

== Economy ==
Myitkyina is the business center of Kachin State, with many natural resources like jade, gold, amber and teak, as well as wood and agricultural products. As per government data, almost US$2 billion in jade was exported yearly in 2010 and 2011. Now, due to fighting between Kachin Independence Army rebels and the government, most businesses in the region have gone down.

== Transportation ==
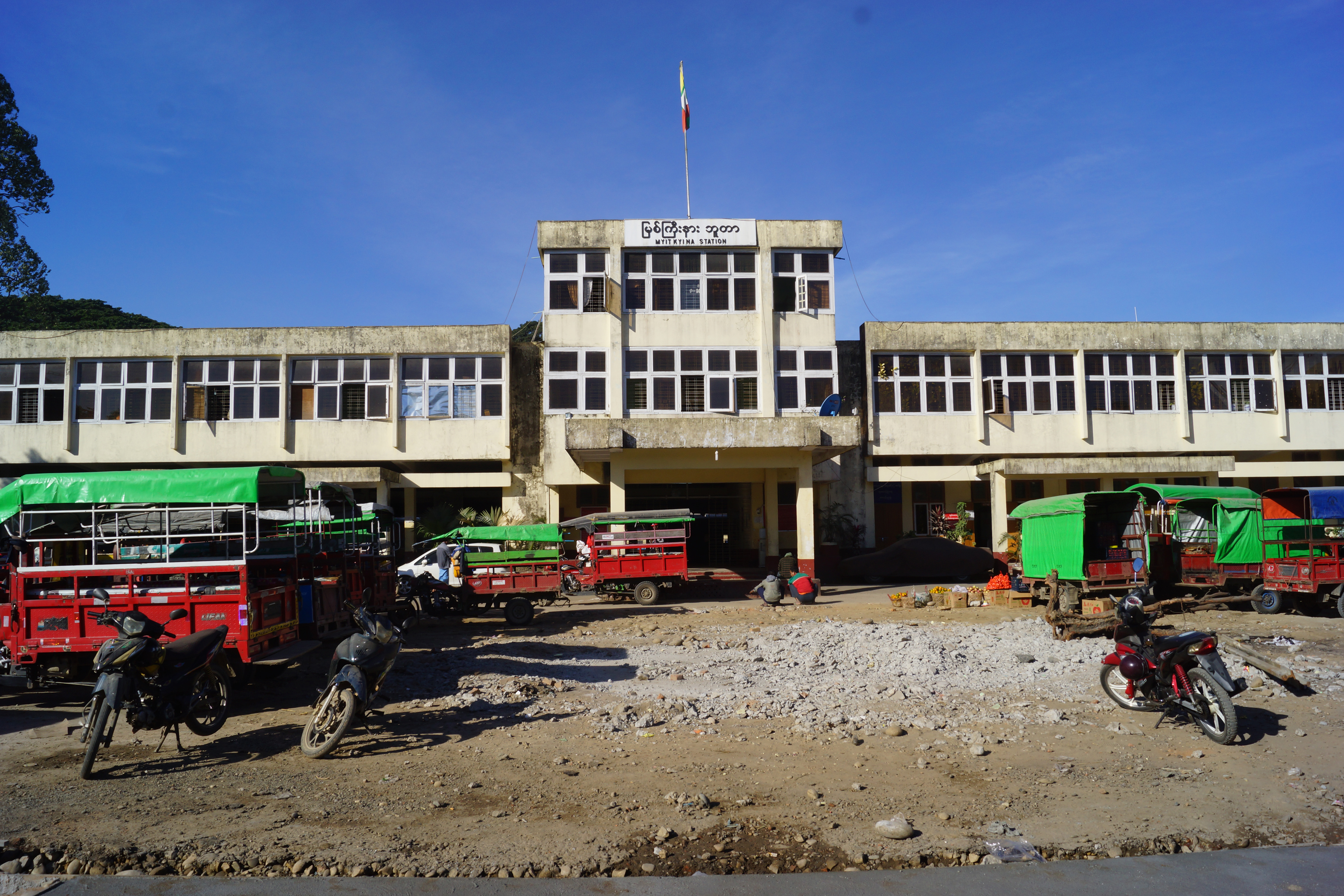
Myitkyina railway station

Myitkyina Airport is the main airport serving the city. It connects the cities of Putao, Mandalay, Yangon and also Lashio on Mondays.

It takes almost 24 hours to travel between Mandalay and Myitkyina by train. Mandalay–Myitkyina Railway has been used for 100 years. This railway is a major means of transportation for both farmers and traders to deliver goods (before 2021 military coup). It also connects Laiza, Bhamo, China, and Sumprabum by car and can go to Mandalay, Yangon, Lashio, and Magwe By Bus Station.

The Myitkyina-Tanai-India road, also known as the Ledo Road, was constructed by the British.

== Education ==
The city is home to Myitkyina University, a Christian theological seminary, a college for teachers, a training school for nurses, a college for the study of computers and other rare types of colleges affiliated with several seminaries in the United States and Asia, notably Kachin Theological College and Seminary(KTCS)-Nawng Nang. It is also home to the branch I.L.B.C. (International Language Business Center), a chain of private schools for English learners in Myanmar. It also has many non-government institutions such as Naushawng development institute, Pinnya Tagar, Ningshawng and Kachinland School of Arts & Sciences, which has a University vision in 2024.

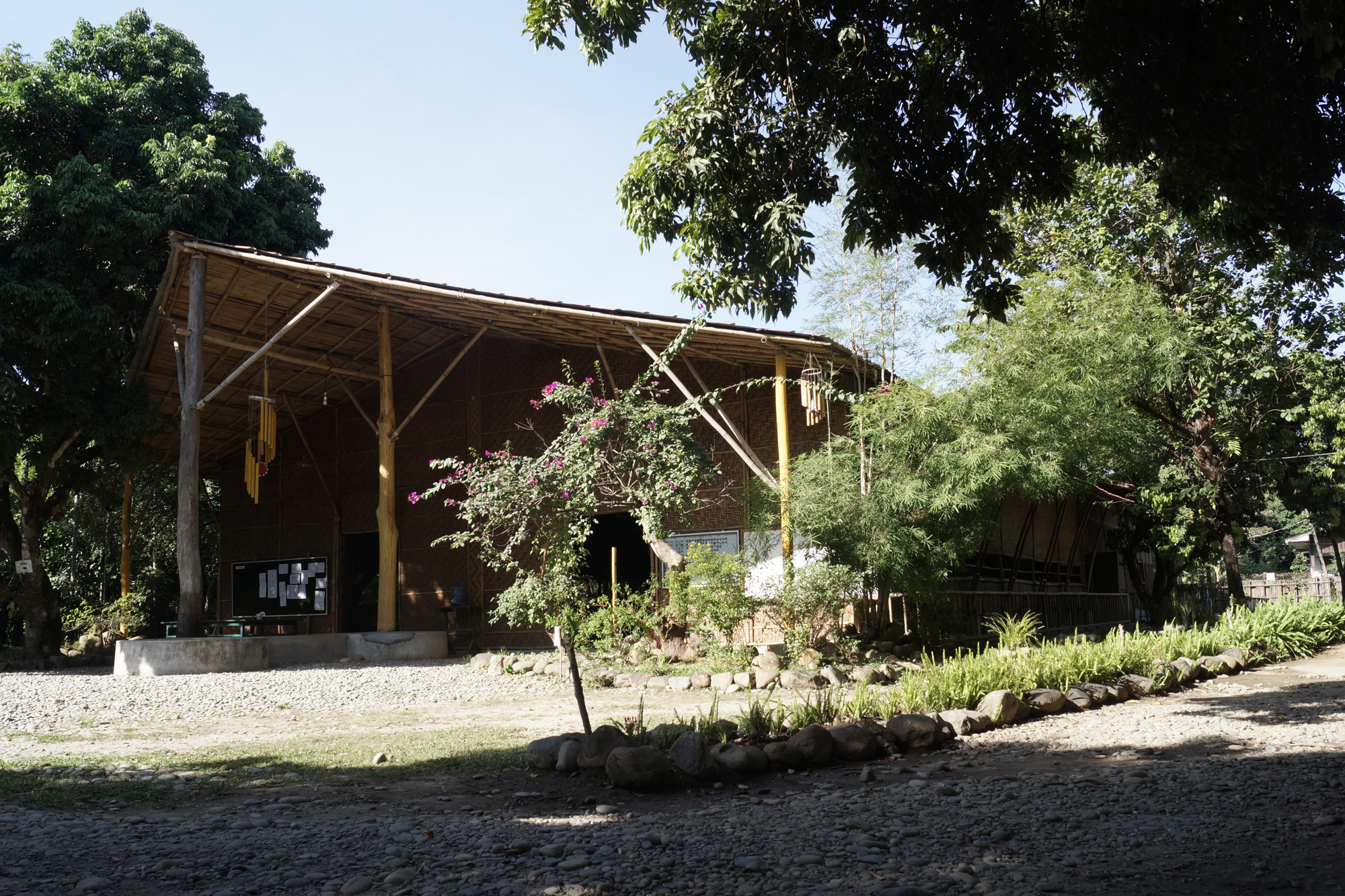
Kachinland School of Arts and Sciences from Myitkyina

- Computer University, Myitkyina
- Myitkyina University
- Myitkyina Education College
- Technological University, Myitkyina

In addition, there are several high schools, including Basic Education High School No. 3 Myitkyina.

== Healthcare ==
=== Public hospitals ===
- Myitkyina General Hospital
- Myitkyina Narcotic Hospital

== Military ==
- Northern SOC (HQ at Myitkyina)
- Nanpong / Nanpong Air Base headquarters (formerly 503 Air Base)
