= Combatants of the Myanmar conflict =

As a protracted armed conflict spanning more than seven decades, the Myanmar conflict has involved over fifty different armed groups, three military juntas, and seven civilian-led governments.

== AFPFL government (1948–1962) ==
Union of Burma (AFPFL government)	Ethnic armed organisations
Tatmadaw; Burma Army; Battalions; No. 1 Burma Rifles; Military police; Taungoo guerillas; No. 2 Burma Rifles; 2× Karen companies; 1× Chin company; 1× Kachin company; No. 3 Burma Rifles; No. 4 Burma Rifles; No. 5 Burma Rifles; No. 6 Burma Rifles; No. 1 Karen Rifles; No. 2 Karen Rifles; No. 3 Karen Rifles; No. 1 Kachin Rifles; No. 2 Kachin Rifles; No. 1 Chin Rifles; No. 2 Chin Rifles; No. 4 Burma Regiment (Gurkhas); Chin Hill Battalion; Regional Military Commands; Northern Command; Southern Command; Eastern Command; Northwestern Command; Southwestern Command; Southeastern Command; Central Command; Burma Navy; Burma Air Force; Burma Police Force	Communist Party of Burma (from 1948); People's Liberation Army (1948–1950); People's Army (from 1950); Communist Party (Burma) (from 1948); Kachin Defence Army (from 1961); Kachin Independence Organisation (from 1960); Kachin Independence Army; Karen National Union (from 1948); Karen National Defence Organisation (from 1948); Karen National Liberation Army (from 1949); Karenni National Progressive Party (from 1957); Karenni Army; Kuomintang (1950–1961); Mujahideen (1948–1954); New Mon State Party (from 1958); Mon National Liberation Army; Noom Suk Harn (from 1958); Pa-O National Organisation (from 1949); Pa-O National Army; Revolutionary Burma Army (from 1948); Shan National United Front; Shan State Communist Party (1956–1958); Shan State Independence Army (from 1960); Shan United Revolutionary Army (from 1960)

== Ne Win's government (1962–1988) ==
Socialist Republic of the Union of Burma (Note: Officially the Union of Burma from 1962 to 1974)	Ethnic armed organisations
Tatmadaw; Burma Army; Regional Military Commands; Northern Command; Southern Command; Western Command; Eastern Command; Northwestern Command; Northeastern Command; Southwestern Command; Southeastern Command; Central Command; Yangon Command; Light Infantry Divisions; 22nd Light Infantry Division; 33rd Light Infantry Division; 44th Light Infantry Division; 55th Light Infantry Division; 66th Light Infantry Division; 77th Light Infantry Division; 88th Light Infantry Division; 99th Light Infantry Division; Burma Navy; Burma Air Force; Burma Police Force	Arakan Liberation Party (from 1968); Arakan Liberation Army; Arakan Rohingya Islamic Front (from 1986); Communist Party of Arakan (from 1962); Communist Party of Burma; People's Army; Communist Party (Burma) (until 1978); Kachin Defence Army; Kachin Independence Organisation; Kachin Independence Army; Karen National Union; Karen National Defence Organisation; Karen National Liberation Army; Karenni National People's Liberation Front (from 1978); Karenni National Progressive Party; Karenni Army; Mong Tai Army (from 1985); National Socialist Council of Nagaland (from 1980); New Mon State Party; Mon National Liberation Army; Pa-O National Organisation; Pa-O National Army; Rohingya Liberation Party (1972–1974); Rohingya Liberation Army; Rohingya Solidarity Organisation (from 1982); Shan State Army (1964–1976); Shan State Progressive Party (from 1971); Shan State Army – North; Shan United Revolutionary Army; Wa National Army (from 1974)

== SLORC / SPDC government (1988–2011) ==
Union of Myanmar (Note: Officially the Union of Burma from 1988 to 1989 and the Republic of the Union of Myanmar from 2008 onwards) (SLORC / SPDC)	Ethnic armed organisations
Tatmadaw; Myanmar Army; Regional Military Commands; Northern Command; Southern Command; Western Command; Eastern Command; Northwestern Command; Northeastern Command; Southwestern Command; Southeastern Command; Central Command; Eastern Central Command; Triangle Region Command; Coastal Region Command; Naypyidaw Command; Yangon Command; Light Infantry Divisions; 11th Light Infantry Division; 22nd Light Infantry Division; 33rd Light Infantry Division; 44th Light Infantry Division; 55th Light Infantry Division; 66th Light Infantry Division; 77th Light Infantry Division; 88th Light Infantry Division; 99th Light Infantry Division; 101st Light Infantry Division; Myanmar Navy; Myanmar Air Force; Myanmar Police Force; Border Guard Police; Border Guard Forces (from 2009); People's Militia Groups; Allied groups: Democratic Karen Buddhist Army (1994–2010); Brigade 333; Brigade 555; Brigade 999; Central Security Forces; Karenni National People's Liberation Front (1994–2009); National Democratic Alliance Army (from 1989); New Democratic Army – Kachin (1989–2009); United Wa State Party (from 1989); United Wa State Army	All Burma Students' Democratic Front (from 1988); Arakan Liberation Party; Arakan Liberation Army; Arakan National Council; Arakan Army (Kayin State) (from 2010); Arakan Rohingya Islamic Front (until 1998); Chin National Front (from 1988); Chin National Army; Communist Party of Arakan (until 2004); DKBA-5 (from 2010); God's Army (1997–2006); Kachin Defence Army (until 2010); Kachin Independence Organisation (until 1994); Kachin Independence Army; Karen National Union; Karen National Defence Organisation; Karen National Liberation Army; Karenni National Progressive Party; Karenni Army; KNU/KNLA Peace Council (from 2007); Kuki National Organisation (from 1988); Kuki National Army; Mongko Region Defence Army (1995–2000); Monland Restoration Army (from 2001); Myanmar National Truth and Justice Party (from 1989); Myanmar National Democratic Alliance Army; National Socialist Council of Nagaland; New Mon State Party (until 1995); Mon National Liberation Army; Palaung State Liberation Front (from 1992); Ta'ang National Liberation Army; Pa-O National Organisation (until 2009); Pa-O National Army; Pa-O National Liberation Organisation (from 2009); Pa-O National Liberation Army; Restoration Council of Shan State (from 1996); Shan State Army – South; Rohingya National Army (1998–2001); Rohingya Solidarity Organisation (until 1998); Shan State National Army (1995–2005); Shan United Revolutionary Army (until 1996); United League of Arakan; Arakan Army (from 2009); Vigorous Burmese Student Warriors (from 1999); Wa National Army (until 1997); Zomi Revolutionary Organisation (from 1997); Zomi Revolutionary Army

== Post-SPDC civilian government (2011–2021) ==
Republic of the Union of Myanmar	Ethnic armed organisations
Tatmadaw; Myanmar Army; Regional Military Commands; Northern Command; Southern Command; Western Command; Eastern Command; Northwestern Command; Northeastern Command; Southwestern Command; Southeastern Command; Central Command; Eastern Central Command; Triangle Region Command; Coastal Region Command; Naypyidaw Command; Yangon Command; Light Infantry Divisions; 11th Light Infantry Division; 22nd Light Infantry Division; 33rd Light Infantry Division; 44th Light Infantry Division; 55th Light Infantry Division; 66th Light Infantry Division; 77th Light Infantry Division; 88th Light Infantry Division; 99th Light Infantry Division; 101st Light Infantry Division; Myanmar Navy; Myanmar Air Force; Myanmar Police Force; Border Guard Police; Border Guard Forces; People's Militia Groups; Allied groups: Peace and Solidarity Committee; National Democratic Alliance Army; United Wa State Party; United Wa State Army	Northern Alliance (from 2016); Kachin Independence Organisation; Kachin Independence Army; Myanmar National Truth and Justice Party; Myanmar National Democratic Alliance Army; Palaung State Liberation Front; Ta'ang National Liberation Army; 5th Brigade; United League of Arakan; Arakan Army; Federal Union Army (from 2011); Arakan National Council; Arakan Army; Karenni National Progressive Party; Karenni Army; Kuki National Organisation; Kuki National Army; Lahu Democratic Union (until 2015); Shan State Progressive Party; Shan State Army – North; Zomi Revolutionary Organisation; Zomi Revolutionary Army; Others: All Burma Students' Democratic Front (until 2015); Arakan Liberation Party (until 2015); Arakan Liberation Army; Arakan Rohingya Salvation Army (from 2016); Chin National Front (until 2015); Chin National Army; DKBA-5 (until 2015); Karen National Union (until 2015); Karen National Defence Organisation; Karen National Liberation Army; KNU/KNLA Peace Council (until 2015); Monland Restoration Army (until 2012); National Socialist Council of Nagaland; Pa-O National Liberation Organisation (until 2012); Pa-O National Liberation Army; Restoration Council of Shan State; Shan State Army – South; Shanni Nationalities Army (from 2016); Vigorous Burmese Student Warriors (untl 2013)

== SAC / NDSC government (since 2021) ==
SAC / NDSC and allied ethnic armed organisations	National Unity Government and allied ethnic armed organisations
Tatmadaw; Myanmar Army; Regional Military Commands; Northern Command; Southern Command; Western Command; Eastern Command; Northwestern Command; Northeastern Command; Southwestern Command; Southeastern Command; Central Command; Eastern Central Command; Triangle Region Command; Coastal Region Command; Naypyidaw Command; Yangon Command; Light Infantry Divisions; 11th Light Infantry Division; 22nd Light Infantry Division; 33rd Light Infantry Division; 44th Light Infantry Division; 55th Light Infantry Division; 66th Light Infantry Division; 77th Light Infantry Division; 88th Light Infantry Division; 99th Light Infantry Division; 101st Light Infantry Division; Myanmar Navy; Myanmar Air Force; Myanmar Police Force; Border Guard Police; Border Guard Forces; People's Militia Groups; Allied groups: Arakan Rohingya Salvation Army; New Democratic Army – Kachin; Pa-O National Organisation (from 2021); Pa-O National Army; Rohingya Solidarity Organisation (from 2021); Shanni Nationalities Army (from 2022)	People's Defence Force; Regional Forces; Chinland Defence Force; Chin National Defence Force; Karenni Nationalities Defence Force; Karenni People's Defence Force; Katha People's Defence Force; Myanmar Royal Dragon Army; People's Defence Force, Bago; People's Defence Force, Kalay; People's Defence Force, Mandalay; People's Defence Force, Monywa; People's Defence Force, Pulaw; People's Defence Force, Sagaing; Yaw Defence Force; Regional Military Commands; Yangon Region Command; Northern Alliance; Kachin Independence Organisation; Kachin Independence Army; Myanmar National Truth and Justice Party; Myanmar National Democratic Alliance Army; Palaung State Liberation Front; Ta'ang National Liberation Army; United League of Arakan; Arakan Army; Federal Union Army; Arakan National Council; Arakan Army; Karenni National Progressive Party; Karenni Army; Kuki National Organisation; Kuki National Army; Lahu Democratic Union; New Mon State Party; Mon National Liberation Army; Shan State Progressive Party; Shan State Army – North; Zomi Revolutionary Organisation; Zomi Revolutionary Army; Others: All Burma Students' Democratic Front; Bamar People's Liberation Army (from 2021); Communist Party of Burma (from 2021); People's Liberation Army; DKBA-5; Karen National Union; Karen National Liberation Army; Karenni National People's Liberation Front (from 2023); National Socialist Council of Nagaland; Peace and Solidarity Committee; National Democratic Alliance Army; Pa-O National Liberation Organisation; Pa-O National Liberation Army; Restoration Council of Shan State; Shan State Army – South; Student Armed Force (from 2021)

== See also ==
- List of wars involving Myanmar
