= List of ethnic armed organisations in Myanmar =

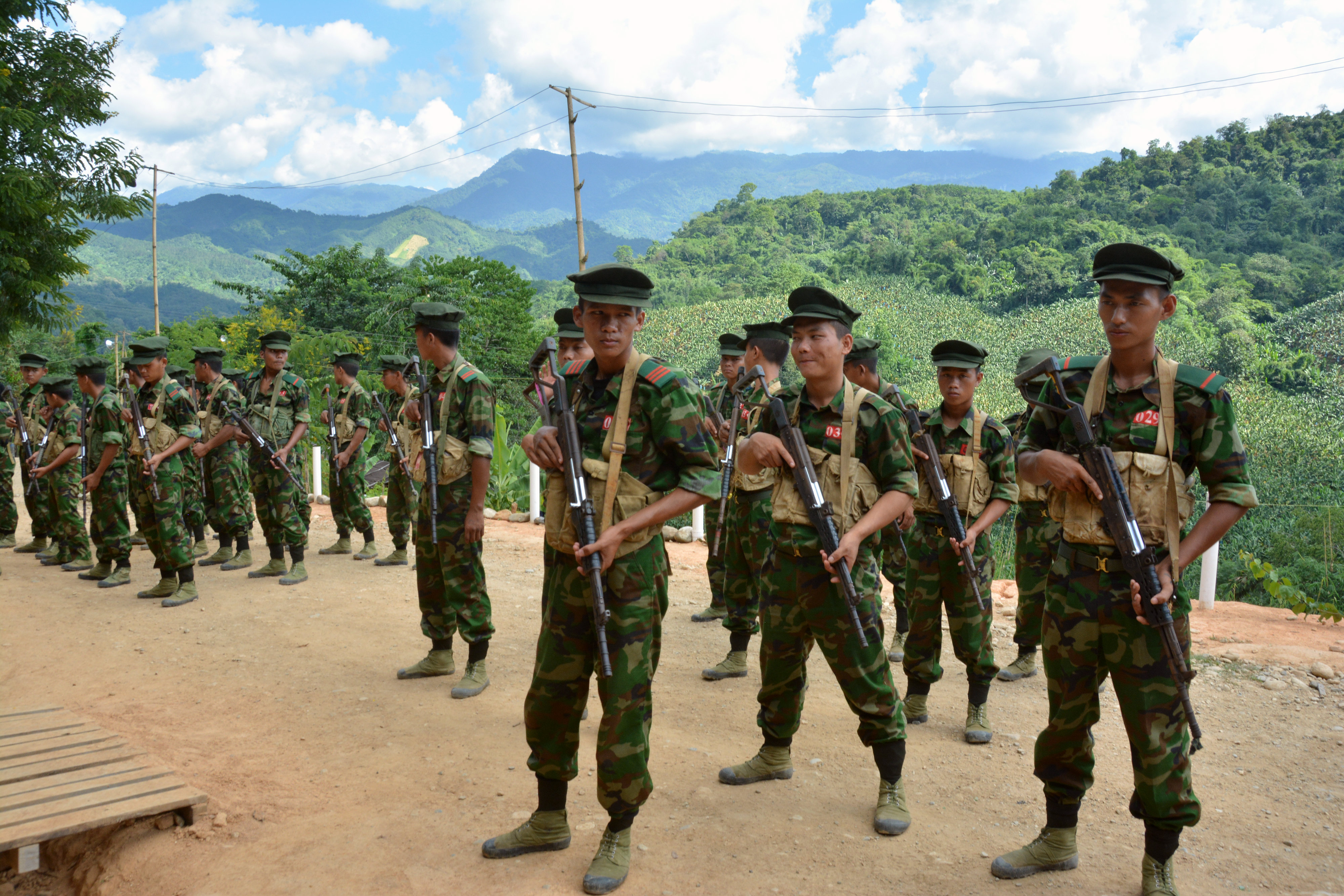
Cadets of the Kachin Independence Army (KIA) preparing for military drills at the group's headquarters in Laiza, Kachin State.

The following is a list of non-state armed groups involved in the Myanmar conflict, officially called ethnic armed organisations (EAOs) by the government of Myanmar.

== Terminology ==
The term "ethnic armed organisation" (Burmese: တိုင်းရင်းသား လက်နက်ကိုင် အဖွဲ့အစည်း) emerged in Myanmar during the Nationwide Ceasefire Agreement negotiations from 2013 to 2015. Various other terms, including "ethnic organisation", "ethnic resistance force", and "ethnic rebel group" have also been used to describe ethnic armed organisations.

These organisations typically:

- claim to represent an ethnic identity
- aim to garner mutual recognition from other ethnic armed organisations through alliances and coalitions
- have an armed wing, and often a separate political wing

== Active ==
=== Myanmar-based ===
Name	Abbreviation	Founded	Strength	Headquarters	Location	Affiliations	Notes
Arakan Army	AA	2009	45,000+	Laiza (former); Rakhine State (current)	Chin State; Kachin State; Rakhine State; Shan State; Bangladesh–Myanmar border; India–Myanmar border	Armed wing of the United League of Arakan; Part of the Three Brotherhood Alliance; Part of the Northern Alliance; Part of the Federal Political Negotiation and Consultative Committee	
Arakan Army (Kayin State)	AA (Kayin)	2010	350 (2024)	Mobile headquarters	Kayin State	Armed wing of the Arakan National Council; Part of the United Nationalities Federal Council	
Arakan Liberation Army	ALA	1968	100 (2024)	Sittwe	Kayin State; Rakhine State	Armed wing of the Arakan Liberation Party	Close allies with the Karen National Union; Joined the CRPH / NUG after the 2021 Myanmar coup d'état; Several factions are allied to the Tatmawdaw
Bamar People's Liberation Army	BPLA	2021	1,000+	Mobile headquarters	Eastern Myanmar		Co-founded by activist Maung Saungkha
Chin National Army	CNA	1988	1,500+ (2024)	Camp Victoria	Chin State	Armed wing of the Chin National Front; Part of the United Nationalities Federal Council (UNFC)	Joined the CRPH / NUG after the 2021 Myanmar coup d'état
Chin National Defence Force	CNDF	2021	Unknown	Falam	Chin State	Armed wing of the Chin National Organisation	
Chinland Defense Force	CDF	2021	Unknown	Mobile headquarters	Chin State; Magway Region; Sagaing Region; India–Myanmar border		
Danu People's Liberation Army	DPLA	2022	~500	Mobile headquarters	Shan State	Armed wing of the Danu People's Liberation Front	
Democratic Karen Benevolent Army	DKBA/DKBA-5	2010	2,000+ (2024)	Sonesee Myaing	Myawaddy Township; Kayin State	Armed wing of the Klohtoobaw Karen Organization	Also known as the Democratic Karen Benevolent Army; Split from the Democratic Karen Buddhist Army in 2010; Joined peace talks with Tatmadaw, leading the Kaw Thoo Lei Army to further split from the DKBA-5 in April 2022 to fight the Tatmadaw
Kachin Independence Army	KIA	1961	20,000 (2018)	Laiza; Pajau (until 2005)	Kachin State, northern Shan State	Armed wing of the Kachin Independence Organisation; Part of the United Nationalities Federal Council (UNFC); Part of the Northern Alliance; Part of the Federal Political Negotiation and Consultative Committee	Holds and governs territory in Kachin State
Karen National Army	KNA	2024	7,000+	Shwe Kokko	Kayin State		Formerly the Karen Border Guard Force; Made up of former soldiers from the Democratic Karen Buddhist Army and Karen Peace Force; Allied to the junta
Karen National Defence Organisation	KNDO	1947	Unknown	Lay Wah; Manerplaw (until 1995)	Kayah State; Kayin State	Affiliate of the Karen National Union	Signed ceasefires with the government in 2012 and 2015; Broke its commitment to the Nationwide Ceasefire Agreement in response to the 2021 Myanmar coup d'état
Karen National Liberation Army	KNLA	1949	15,000 (2021)	Lay Wah; Manerplaw (until 1995)	Kayah State; Kayin State; Tanintharyi Region	Armed wing of the Karen National Union; Part of the United Nationalities Federal Council (UNFC)	Broke its commitment to the Nationwide Ceasefire Agreement in response to the 2021 Myanmar coup d'état
Karenni Army	KA	1949	1,500 (2012)	Nya Moe	Kayah State	Armed wing of the Karenni National Progressive Party; Part of the United Nationalities Federal Council (UNFC)	Signed ceasefires with the government in 2005 and 2012; Resumed hostilities in response to the 2021 Myanmar coup d'état
Karenni National People's Liberation Front	KNPLF	1978	2,000	Pankan	Kayah State		Split from the Karenni Army; Signed ceasefire in 1989 and transformed into a BGF in 2009; Defected to anti-junta forces in June 2023
Karenni Nationalities Defence Force	KNDF	2021	7,000+	Mobile headquarters	Kayah State; Shan State; Kayin State; Myanmar–Thailand border		
Kayan National Army	KNA	2024	Unknown	Unknown	Kayah State; Southern Shan State		
Kayan New Land Army	KNLP/A	1964	200–300	Seebu	Kayah State; Southern Shan State; North Kayin State; Naypyidaw Union Territory	Armed wing of the Kayan New Land Party	Signed a ceasefire agreement with the Tatmadaw in 1994; Governs Kayah State Special Region 3; Despite aiding resistance groups, the KNLP/A is allied to the Tatmadaw
Kawthoolei Army	KTLA	2022	Unknown		Kayin State		Broke away from the Karen National Union July 2022
KNU/KNLA Peace Council	KPC	2007	500+ (2024)	To-kawko	Kayin State	Not affiliated with the KNU or KNLA, despite its name	
Lahu Democratic Union	LDU	1973	1,500 (2024)	Loi Lan	Shan State		Signed the Nationwide Ceasefire Agreement (NCA) in 2018, along with the Mon National Liberation Army; Anti-NCA faction joined the CRPH / NUG after the 2021 Myanmar coup d'état
Mon National Liberation Army	MNLA	1958	1,000+ (2024)	Ye Chaung Phya	Mon State; Tanintharyi Region; Kayin State	Armed wing of the New Mon State Party	Signed the Nationwide Ceasefire Agreement in 2018, along with the Lahu Democratic Union
Mon State Revolutionary Force	MSRF	2021	Unknown	Mobile headquarters	Mon State; Kayin State	Armed wing of the Mon State Federal Council	Armed wing of MSFC alongside the Mon State Defense Force
Myanmar National Democratic Alliance Army	MNDAA	1989	6,000	Mobile headquarters	Shan State (Kokang)	Armed wing of the Myanmar National Truth and Justice Party; Part of the Three Brotherhood Alliance; Part of the Northern Alliance; Part of the Federal Political Negotiation and Consultative Committee	Split from the Communist Party of Burma after its dissolution; Governs the Kokang Self-Administered Zone and Shan State Special Region 1
National Democratic Alliance Army	NDAA	1989	3,000–4,000 (2016)	Mong La	Shan State	Part of the Federal Political Negotiation and Consultative Committee	Split from the Communist Party of Burma after its dissolution; Governs Eastern Shan State Special Region 4
New Democratic Army – Kachin	NDA-K; KBGF	1989	700 (peak)	Pangwa	Kachin State		Signed a ceasefire agreement with the government in 1989 and transformed into a Border Guard Forces in 2009
Pa-O National Army	PNA	1949	4,000 (2023)	Taunggyi	Shan State	Armed wing of the Pa-O National Organisation	Governs the Pa-O Self-Administered Zone; Signed a ceasefire with the government in 1991 and disbanded in 2009; Reestablished after the 2021 Myanmar coup d'état
Pa-O National Liberation Army	PNLA	2009	1,000+ (2024)	Camp Laybwer	Shan State; Myanmar–Thailand border	Armed wing of the Pa-O National Liberation Organisation	Split into a pro-peace talk and anti-junta faction in January 2024
Ramonnya Mon Army	RMA	2024	1,500	Unknown	Mon State; Kayin State	Armed wing of the New Mon State Party (Anti-Military Dictatorship)	Split from MNLA on 14 February 2024 to join anti-junta forces; Merger of Mon National Liberation Army (Anti-Dictatorship) and Mon Liberation Army
Shanni Nationalities Army	SNA	2016	1,000+ (2019)	Mobile headquarters	Kachin State		Allies with the Shan State Army (RCSS) and the Tatmadaw
Shan State Army (SSPP) (Note: Both the Shan State Progress Party and the Restoration Council of Shan State use "Shan State Army" as the name of their armed forces, so they're either distinguished by using the political organisation or adding North/South at the end)	SSPP/SSA	1971	10,000 (2023)	Wan Hai	Shan State	Armed wing of the Shan State Progress Party; Part of the United Nationalities Federal Council (UNFC); Part of the Federal Political Negotiation and Consultative Committee	Signed ceasefire with Tatmadaw
Shan State Army (RCSS)	RCSS/SSA	1996	8,000 (2024)	Loi Tai Leng	Shan State; Myanmar–Thailand border	Armed wing of the Restoration Council of Shan State; Part of the Shan State Congress	Split from the Mong Tai Army in 1995
Wuyang People's Militia	LEM/LNDP	2013	100 (2022)	Myitkyina	Kachin State	Armed wing of the Lisu National Development Party	Allied with the Tatmadaw; "People's Militia" created by the LNDP; Militia leader U Shwe Min was killed 7 March, 2024
Ta'ang National Liberation Army	TNLA	1992	8,000–10,000 (2024)	Mobile headquarters	Shan State	Part of the United Nationalities Federal Council (UNFC); Part of the Three Brotherhood Alliance; Part of the Northern Alliance; Part of the Federal Political Negotiation and Consultative Committee	Governs the Pa Laung Self-Administered Zone
United Wa State Army	UWSA	1989	25,000 (2015)	Pangkham	Shan State	Armed wing of the United Wa State Party; Part of the Federal Political Negotiation and Consultative Committee	Governs the Wa Self-Administered Division (Wa State)
Wa National Army	WNA	1969	200 (1998)	Homein	Shan State	Armed wing of the Wa National Organisation; Part of the United Nationalities Federal Council (UNFC)	Signed a peace agreement with the government in August 1997

=== Foreign-based ===
Name	Abbreviation	Founded	Strength	Headquarters	Location	Affiliations	Notes
Arakan Rohingya Army	ARA	2020	Unknown	Rohingya refugee camps, Cox's Bazar	Bangladesh–Myanmar border		
Arakan Rohingya Salvation Army	ARSA	2013	~200 (2018)	Rohingya refugee camps, Cox's Bazar	Chittagong Division; Bangladesh–Myanmar border; Northern Rakhine State		Previously known as Harakah al-Yaqin; Accused of being allied to the Tatmadaw
Kamtapur Liberation Organisation	KLO	1995	Unknown	Taga, Sagaing (until 2019)	Sagaing Region; India–Myanmar border	Part of the UNLFW	Based in India and operates in Assam and West Bengal
Kanglei Yawol Kanna Lup	KYKL	1994	Unknown	Mobile Headquarters	Sagaing Region	Part of CorCom	Based in India and operates in Manipur; Has bases in and trained in Myanmar; Unofficially allied with the Tatmadaw
Kangleipak Communist Party	KCP	1980	~112 (2012)	Mobile Headquarters	Sagaing Region	Part of CorCom	Based in India and operates in Manipur; Has bases in and trained in Myanmar; Unofficially allied with the Tatmadaw
Kuki National Army	KNA(B)	1988	1200+ (2024)	Mobile headquarters	Chin State; Sagaing Region	Armed wing of the Kuki National Organisation	Based in India and operates in Manipur
Kuki-Chin National Army	KCNA	2017	Unknown	Mobile headquarters	Chin State; Rakhine State	Armed wing of the Kuki-Chin National Front	Active in the Chittagong Hill Tracts in Bangladesh; Headquartered and trained in Myanmar
Naga Army	NSCN-K; NSCN-K-AM; NSCN-K-YA; NSCN-IM	1980	<500 (2016)	Taga, Sagaing (Myanmar) (until 2019); Camp Hebron, Peren District, Nagaland (India)	Sagaing Region (Naga Self-Administered Zone); India–Myanmar border	Part of the UNLFW	Based in India and operates primarily in Northeast India; Signed a ceasefire agreement with India in 2001 and Myanmar in 2012; Consists of several factions
People's Liberation Army of Manipur	PLAM	1978	3,800 (2008)	Manipur	Sagaing Region; Chin State	Part of CorCom	Based in India and operates in Manipur; Unofficially allied with the Tatmadaw
People's Revolutionary Party of Kangleipak	PREPAK	1977	~200 (2012)	Mobile headquarters	Sagaing Region	Part of CorCom	Based in India and operates in Manipur; Has bases in and trained in Myanmar; Unofficially allied with the Tatmadaw
Rohingya Islami Mahaz	RIM	2020	Unknown		Bangladesh–Myanmar border; Northern Rakhine State		
Rohingya Solidarity Organisation	RSO	1982	Unknown		Bangladesh–Myanmar border; Northern Rakhine State		Mainly active in the 1990s, militarily defunct by 1998; Alleged by the Tatmadaw to have had connections with the Taliban and Al-Qaeda in the early 2000s; Reestablished after the 2021 Myanmar coup d'état; Fought alongside the Tatmadaw during the battle of Maungdaw
United Liberation Front of Asom-Independent	ULFA-I	1979	200 (2024)	Taga, Sagaing (until 2019)	Sagaing Region; India–Myanmar border; China–Myanmar border	Part of the UNLFW	Based in India and operates in Assam; Pro-truce faction disbanded in 2023 after signing a peace agreement with the Indian government
United National Liberation Front	UNLF	1964	2,000	Manipur	Chin State; Sagaing Region; India–Myanmar border	Part of CorCom	Based in India and operated in Manipur; Signed ceasefire agreement with the Indian government in 2023
Zomi Revolutionary Army	ZRA-EC	1997	130 (2016)	Churachandpur	Chin State; India–Myanmar border	Armed wing of the Zomi Revolutionary Organisation	Based in India and operates in Manipur and Mizoram; Signed a ceasefire with India in 2005; Accused of being allied with the Tatmadaw

== Defunct ==
Name	Abbreviation	Founded	Disbanded	Strength	Headquarters	Location	Affiliations	Notes
Arakan Rohingya Islamic Front	ARIF	1986	1998	Unknown	Mobile headquarters	Rakhine State; Bangladesh–Myanmar border		
National Democratic Front of Boroland	NDFB	1986	2020	3,000+	Taga, Sagaing (until 2019)	Sagaing Region; India–Myanmar border	Part of the UNLFW	Based in India and operated in Assam and Arunachal Pradesh; After splitting into several factions, disbanded in 2020 after signing a peace agreement with the Indian government
Communist Party of Arakan	CPA	1962	2004	Unknown	Mobile headquarters	Rakhine State		Split from the Red Flag Communist Party
Democratic Karen Buddhist Army	DKBA	1994	2010	<5,000	Mobile headquarters	Kayin State		Signed a ceasefire agreement shortly after its formation in 1994 and disbanded in 2010; Split from the Karen National Union
God's Army		1997	2006	500	Mobile headquarters	Myanmar–Thailand border		Surrendered to government forces in 2006
Kachin Defense Army	KDA	1991	2023	2,850 (2020)	Kawnghka	Shan State		Originated as the Kachin Independence Army's 4th brigade; Reorganised into a pro-Tatmadaw militia in 2010; Surrendered to KIA in 2023
Mongko Region Defence Army	MRDA	1995	2000	Unknown	Mongko	Shan State; China–Myanmar border		Split from the Myanmar National Democratic Alliance Army
Mong Tai Army	MTA	1985	1996	20,000	Homein	Shan State; Myanmar–Thailand border		Surrendered to the government in 1996
Monland Restoration Army	MRA	2001	2012	100–300	Sangkhlaburi	Mon State; Tanintharyi Region	Armed wing of the Hongsawatoi Restoration Party	Surrendered to government forces in 2012
Mujahideen	None	1947	1954	2,000	Mayu	Rakhine State		Majority of fighters surrendered to the government in the late 1950s and early 1960s
Rohingya Liberation Party	RLP	1972	1974	800–2,500	Mobile headquarters	Rakhine State		Insurgents fled across the border into Bangladesh after a massive military operation by the government in July 1974
Rohingya National Army	RNA	1998	2001	Unknown	Cox's Bazar	Rakhine State; Bangladesh–Myanmar border	Armed wing of the Arakan Rohingya National Organisation (ARNO)	
Rohingya Patriotic Front	RPF	1974	1980s	70	Mobile headquarters	Rakhine State		
Shan State Army	SSA	1964	1976	1,500	Mobile headquarters	Shan State		Formed the basis for the Shan State Army – North and Shan State Army – South; Also fought other insurgent groups such as the Communist Party of Burma
Shan State National Army	SSNA	1995	2005	8,000 (peak)	Hsipaw	Shan State		Merged with the Shan State Army – South in 2005
Shan United Revolutionary Army	SURA	1960	1996	Unknown	Homein	Shan State; Myanmar–Thailand border		Majority of its members surrendered to the government in 1996; 800 insurgents under the command of Yawd Serk would go on to form the Shan State Army – South
Vigorous Burmese Student Warriors	VBSW	1999	20??	Unknown	Mobile headquarters	Myanmar–Thailand border		No insurgent or terror activity has been attributed to the VBSW since 2013; Gained notoriety in the October 1999 siege of the Burmese consulate in Bangkok, Thailand

== Coalitions ==
Name	Abbreviation	Founded	Headquarters	Members	Notes
Federal Union Army	FUA	2011	Chiang Mai	Arakan Army; Karenni Army; Lahu Democratic Union; New Mon State Party; Shan State Army (SSPP)	Armed wing of the United Nationalities Federal Council
Northern Alliance	NA-B	2016	Laiza	Arakan Army; Kachin Independence Army; Myanmar National Democratic Alliance Army; Ta'ang National Liberation Army	All four members of the Northern Alliance are also members of the Federal Political Negotiation and Consultative Committee.
Three Brotherhood Alliance	3BA	2019		Arakan Army; Myanmar National Democratic Alliance Army; Ta'ang National Liberation Army	
Chinland Council	CC	2023	Camp Victoria	Chin National Army; Chinland Defense Force-Hakha; Chinland Defense Force-Paletwa; Chinland Defense Force-Matupi; Chinland Defense Force-Thantlang; Chinland Defense Force-Mara; Chinland Defense Force-Zanniat; Chinland Defense Force-Zotung; Chinland Defense Force-Zophei; Chinland Defense Force-Lautu; Chinland Defense Force-Senthang; Chinland Defense Force-Tonzang; Chinland Defense Force-Hualngoram; Chinland Defense Force-Sizang; Chinland Defense Force-KKG; Asho Chin-Defense Force	Established as the army and governing body of the State of Chinland
Chin Brotherhood Alliance	CBA	2023		Chin National Defence Force; Chin People's Army; Maraland Defence Force; Zoland Defence Force	Political and military alliance of several Chin resistance groups created out of protest against the establishment of the State of Chinland
Spring Revolution Alliance	SRA	2025		Bamar People's Liberation Army; Karenni Nationalities Defence Force; Student Armed Force; Chin Brotherhood; People's Independence Army; Burma Liberation Democratic Front; 96 Soldiers PDF; Generation Z Army; Bamar Army; Force of Federal Democracy; Danu People's Liberation Army; Magway PDF; Mon State Revolutionary Force; National Liberation Army; Kalay Revolution Force; Pa-O National Defense Force; Sagaing PDF; Yaw Army; Yaw Defense Force	
United National Liberation Front of Western South East Asia	UNLFW	2015	Taga, Sagaing (until 2019)	United Liberation Front of Asom-Independent; National Socialist Council of Nagaland-Khaplang; Kamtapur Liberation Organisation; National Democratic Front of Boroland	Alliance of several Northeast India separatist groups active in Myanmar
Coordination Committee	CorCom	2011		Kangleipak Communist Party; Kanglei Yawol Kanna Lup; People's Revolutionary Party of Kangleipak; People's Liberation Army of Manipur; United National Liberation Front	Alliance of several majority-Meitei separatist groups active in Northeast India with bases in Myanmar
4K Coalition		2023		Karen National Liberation Army; Karenni Army; Karenni National People's Liberation Front; Karenni Nationalities Defence Force	Alliance of ethnic Karen and Karenni rebel organisations
7 EAO Alliance		2024		Restoration Council of Shan State; New Mon State Party; Arakan Liberation Party; Pa-O National Liberation Organisation; Lahu Democratic Union; Democratic Karen Benevolent Army; KNU/KNLA Peace Council	Alliance of signatories of the Nationwide Ceasefire Agreement (NCA)
Four Brothers Alliance		2025	Dil Muhammad	Arakan Rohingya Army; Arakan Rohingya Salvation Army; Rohingya Islami Mahaz; Rohingya Solidarity Organisation	Alliance of Rohingya militias

== See also ==
- Combatants of the Myanmar conflict
- List of political and military organisations in Myanmar
