= List of Burmese flags =

This is a list of flags used in Myanmar (also known as Burma).

== State/Union flag ==
Flag	Date	Use	Description
	21 October 2010	State Flag of the Republic of the Union of Myanmar, also called the Union Flag	A horizontal triband of yellow, green, and red; charged with a large white five-pointed star at the centre
	21 October 2010	State Flag of the Republic of the Union of Myanmar, also called the Union Flag	The vertical presentation places the yellow stripe to the left and the red stripe to the right

== Flags of administrative divisions ==
=== States ===
Flag	Date	Use	Description
	1986	Flag of Chin State	A blue-red-green horizontal tricolour with a central white disc containing a hornbill on a branch, surrounded by nine white stars
	2010	Flag of Kachin State	On a green field, a blue disc containing white mountains defaced with Manaw poles
	2010	Flag of Kayah State	A kinnara centred on a red-blue-green horizontal triband
		Flag of Kayin State	Blue-white-red horizontal triband with a white star at the hoist within the blue band
	8 June 2018	Flag of Mon State	Yellow hamsa on a red field
		Flag of Rakhine State	Emblem of Rakhine, a Shrivatsa, on a blue disc in the centre of a white-red horizontal bicolour
	12 February 1947	Flag of Shan State	White disc, representing the moon, on a yellow-green-red horizontal triband

=== Regions ===
Flag	Date	Use	Description
	2022	Flag of Ayeyarwady Region	Seal of Ayeyarwady Region on a blue field
	c. 2018	Flag of Bago Region	Female hamsa perched on a male hamsa within a white disc bordered in green on a dark blue field. The text ပဲခူးတိုင်းဒေသကြီး ("Bago Region") is above the disc.
	2021	Flag of Magway Region	Seal of Magway Region on a yellow field with the text မကွေးတိုင်းဒေသကြီး ("Magway Region") above the seal in green.
	2010 (except 2021)	Flag of Mandalay Region	Seal of Mandalay Region on a red field
	30 September 2019	Flag of Sagaing Region	Seal of Sagaing Region centred on a yellow-blue-red horizontal triband with the text စစ်ကိုင်းတိုင်းဒေသကြီး ("Sagaing Region") above the seal within the yellow band.
	2010	Flag of Tanintharyi Region	Naga facing forward with a white star above on a red-blue-green horizontal triband
	2022	Flag of Yangon Region	Inner portion of the Seal of Yangon Region centred on a yellow-green-red horizontal triband with the text ရန်ကုန်တိုင်းဒေသကြီးအစိုးရအဖွဲ့ ("Yangon Region Government Group") on a white banner below the seal.

=== Union territory ===
Flag	Date	Use	Description
		Flag of the Naypyidaw Union Territory	Seal of the Naypyidaw Union Territory on a bright blue field

=== Self-administered zones and divisions ===
==== Self-administered zones ====
Flag	Date	Use	Description
	2017	Flag of the Danu Self-Administered Zone	Blue over yellow bicolour with a green disc at the centre charged with a white flower
		Flag of the Kokang Self-Administered Zone	Blue-red-green horizontal triband charged with a white star and eight interlocking white circular rings forming an arc above the star.
		Flag of the Naga Self-Administered Zone	White over red bicolour with a green square in the upper hoist charged with two crossed spears and a tribal headdress
		Flag of the Pa Laung Self-Administered Zone	Red disc on a light blue-yellow-green horizontal triband.
	1955	Flag of the Pa'O Self-Administered Zone	White star within a blue canton on a red-green horizontal bicolour

==== Self-administered divisions ====
Flag	Date	Use	Description
		Flag of the Wa Self-Administered Division	There is no official flag, the flag of Myanmar is used

== Legislature flags ==
Flag	Date	Use	Description
	2011?	Flag of the Chin State Hluttaw	A couple of Hornbills on a branch of rhododendron with six flowers, surrounded by nine red stars on the lower half and one red star on the top of them, within a white disc, atop a blue-red-green horizontal triband

== Military flags ==
Flag	Date	Use	Description
		Flag of the Myanmar Armed Forces (Tatmadaw)	A horizontal triband of red, white, and blue; charged with a large yellow five-pointed star at the centre
		Flag of the Ministry of Defence (Myanmar)	

=== Commander-in-Chief ===
Flag	Date	Use	Description
	2015	Flag of the Commander-in-Chief of Defence Services	A red, dark blue, and light blue horizontal tricolour defaced with five golden stars under the golden logo of the Tatmadaw
	2015	Flag of the Deputy Commander-in-Chief of Defence Services	A red, dark blue, and light blue horizontal tricolour defaced with four golden stars under the golden logo of the Tatmadaw
	c. 2015	Flag of the Office of the Commander-in-Chief (Army)	A red field defaced with four golden stars under the golden logo of the Tatmadaw
	c. 2015	Flag of the Office of the Commander-in-Chief (Navy)	A dark blue field defaced with four golden stars under the golden logo of the Tatmadaw
	c. 2015	Flag of the Office of the Commander-in-Chief (Air Force)	A light blue field defaced with four golden stars under the golden logo of the Tatmadaw

=== Army ===
Flag	Date	Use	Description
	c. 1994	Flag of the Myanmar Army	A horizontal triband of blue, red, and blue; charged with a large white five-pointed star at the centre
	c. 1994	Ceremonial guidon of the Myanmar Army	A horizontal triband of blue, red, and blue; charged with a large white five-pointed star at the centre

==== Regional Military Commands ====
Flag	Use	Description
	Flag of the Northern Command	
	Flag of the North Western Command	
	Flag of the North Eastern Command	
	Flag of the Eastern Command	
	Flag of the Eastern Central Command	
	Flag of the Triangle Region Command	
	Flag of the Western Command	
	Flag of the Naypyitaw Command	
	Flag of the Central Command	
	Flag of the Southern Command	
	Flag of the South Western Command	
	Flag of the Yangon Command	
	Flag of the South Eastern Command	
	Flag of the Coastal Region Command	

==== Common flags ====
Flag	Use	Description
	Flag of the Infantry and Light Infantry	A red field charged with Bandula badge: a white ancient Burmese helmet crossed by a white sword and a white spear
	Flag of the Artillery Corps	
	Flag of the Engineering Corps	
	Flag of the Signal Corps	
	Flag of the Armour Corps	
	Flag of the Medical Corps	
	Flag of the Corps of Supply and Transport	
	Flag of the Ordnance Services	
	Flag of the Corps of Electrical and Mechanical Engineering	
	Flag of the Defence Industries	
	Flag of the Security Printing Works	
	Flag of the Recovery and Resettlement Units	
	Flag of the Border Guard Forces	Recently, Tatmadaw ordered to change the arm patch of Border Guard and People’s militia.

==== Battalions ====
Infantry Battalions
Flag	Use
	Flag of the No. (14) Infantry Battalion

==== Divisions ====
Light Infantry Divisions
Flag	Use
	Flag of the No. (11) Light Infantry Division
	Flag of the No. (22) Light Infantry Division
	Flag of the No. (33) Light Infantry Division
	Flag of the No. (44) Light Infantry Division
	Flag of the No. (55) Light Infantry Division
	Flag of the No. (66) Light Infantry Division
	Flag of the No. (77) Light Infantry Division
	Flag of the No. (88) Light Infantry Division
	Flag of the No. (99) Light Infantry Division
	Flag of the No. (101) Light Infantry Division

=== Navy ===
Flag	Date	Use	Description
	1994	Naval ensign of the Myanmar Navy	White field with a red canton charged with a white five-pointed star and a blue anchor in the lower fly
		Commissioning pennant of the Myanmar Navy	

=== Air Force ===
Flag	Date	Use	Description
	c. 2010s	Air force ensign of the Myanmar Air Force	A light blue field defaced with the Union Star in the canton, and the Myanmar Air Force roundel in the lower fly

== Law enforcement flag ==
Flag	Date	Use	Description
		Flag of the Myanmar Police Force	Three vertical bands of yellow, blue, and red, with a union star in the centre
		Ensign of the Myanmar Coast Guard	White field with a blue canton charged with a white five-pointed star and two blue anchors crossed in the lower fly

== Ministry flags ==
Flag	Date	Use	Description
		Flag of the Ministry of Education	
		Flag of the Ministry of Defence	A red field charged with logo of the Ministry of Defence
		Flag of the Ministry of Home Affairs	A horizontal triband of blue, yellow, and green; charged with black Burmese script reading "Home Affairs" (ပြည်ထဲရေး) on the yellow band.

== Religious flags ==
Flag	Date	Use	Description
	1956	Sasana flag, the flag of Buddhism in Myanmar	Vertical bands of blue, yellow, red, white, light pink and the vertical band of the combination of these five colours' rectangular bands.
	1954	Flag of the Republic of the Union of Myanmar Islamic Religious Affairs Council	A red field with a green canton containing the Takbir
		Flag of the Young Men's Buddhist Association	A horizontal triband of yellow, green, and red; charged with a yellow disc at the centre; a green Swastika on that disc and each of the four red letters — "Y", "M", "B", "A" — inside each blank between the arms of the Swastika

== Political flags ==
Flag	Date	Use	Description
	2019–present	Mon Unity Party	
	2018–present	Arakan Front Party	
	2018–present	Lahu Democratic Union	
Link to file	2016–present	National Unity Party	
	1988–2016	National Unity Party	
	2015–present	Akha National Development Party	
	2015–present	Zo National Regional Development Party^{my}	
Link to file	2014–present	Arakan National Party	
	2014–present	Karen National Party	
	2014–present	People's Party of Myanmar Farmers and Workers	
Link to file	2013–present	Democracy and Human Rights Party	
	1980s	Democracy and Human Rights Party	
Link to file	2013–present	Lisu National Development Party	
	2013–present	Federal Union Party	
Link to file	2012–present	Myanmar Farmers Development Party	
	2012–present	Tai-Leng Nationalities Development Party	
	2012–present	United League of Arakan	
	2011–present	United Nationalities Federal Council	
	2010–present	All Mon Region Democracy Party	
	2010–present	Chin National Party	
	2010–present	Ethnic National Development Party	
Link to file	2010–present	Inn National Development Party	
	2010–present	Kaman National Progressive Party^{my}	
	2010–present	Kayin People's Party	
	2010–present	Kokang Democracy and Unity Party	
Link to file	2010–present	Lahu National Development Party	
	2010–present	National Democratic Force	
Link to file	2010–present	Peace and Diversity Party	
	2010–present	Shan Nationalities Democratic Party	
	2010–present	Ta'ang National Party	
	2010–present	Unity and Democracy Party of Kachin State	
	2010–present	Union Solidarity and Development Party	
	2010–present	Wa Democratic Party	
	2004–present	Arakan National Council	
	1996–present	Restoration Council of Shan State	
Link to file	1989–present	Arakan League for Democracy	
	1989–present	Chin National League for Democracy	
	1989–present	United Wa State Party	
	1989–present	Wa State	
	1988–present	Chin National Front	
Link to file	1988–present	Democratic Party	
	1988–present	Democratic Party for a New Society	
	1988–present	Kachin State National Congress for Democracy	
	1988–present	Mon National Party	
	1988–present	Mro National Development Party	
	1988–present	National League for Democracy	
	1992–present	Palaung State Liberation Front	
	2024–present	Special Region 1	
	1989–present	Eastern Shan State Special Region 4	
	1988–present	Shan Nationalities League for Democracy	
Link to file	1988–present	Zomi Congress for Democracy	
	1985–present	Communist Party of Burma	
	1946–1969	Communist Party of Burma	
	1939–1946	Communist Party of Burma	
	1971–present	Shan State Progress Party	
	1967–present	Arakan Liberation Party	
	1958–present	New Mon State Party	
	1957–present	Karenni National Progressive Party	
	1949–present	Pa-O National Organisation	
	1947–present	Karen National Union	
	1936–present	All Burma Federation of Student Unions	

=== Other ===
Flag	Date	Use	Description
	2021	Three-finger salute flag	A red field charged with a white three-finger salute symbol. Flown in opposition against the 1 February coup.

== Armed groups ==
Flag	Date	Use	Description
	2022–present	Myanmar Royal Dragon Army	
	2021–present	Bamar People's Liberation Army	
	2021–present	Chin National Defence Force	
	2021–present	Karen National Liberation Army	
	1949–2021	Karen National Liberation Army	
	2021–present	Karenni Nationalities Defence Force	
	2022–present	Kawthoolei Army	
	2021–present	People's Defence Force	
	2021–present	People's Liberation Army	
	2021–present	People's Defence Force – Kalay	
	2021–present 1982–1998	Rohingya Solidarity Organisation	
	2021–present	Student Armed Force	
	2020–present	Arakan Rohingya Army	
	2016–present	Shanni Nationalities Army	
	2013–present	Arakan Rohingya Salvation Army	
	2020–present	Rohingya Islami Mahaz	
	2011–present	Federal Union Army	
	2010–present	Arakan Army (Kayin State)	
	2009–present	Arakan Army	
	1997–present	Zomi Revolutionary Army	
	1996–present	Shan State Army – South	
	1994–present	National United Party of Arakan	
	1994–present	Democratic Karen Buddhist Army and DKBA-5	
	1992–present	Ta'ang National Liberation Army	
	1989–present	Myanmar National Democratic Alliance Army	
	1989–present	National Democratic Alliance Army	
	1989–present	United Wa State Army	
	1988–present	All Burma Students' Democratic Front	
	1988–present	Chin National Army	
	1988–present	Kuki National Army	
	1980–present	National Socialist Council of Nagaland	
	1968–present	Arakan Liberation Army	
	1971–present	Shan State Army – North	
	1969–present	Wa National Army	
	1961–present	Kachin Independence Army	
	1957–present	Karenni Army	
	1949–present	Pa-O National Army	
	1947–present	Karen National Defence Organisation	

== Historical flags ==
=== National ===
Flag	Date	Use	Description
	c. 1300s – c. 1500s	Flag used in the Hanthawaddy kingdom	A green field with a golden hamsa in the centre
	c. 1752 – 1885	National flag of the Third Burmese Empire under the Konbaung Dynasty	A swallowtail with white field charged with a green peacock biting a flower branch on a red disc (the sun) in the centre of the field
	1824–1942	Union Flag of the United Kingdom used as the state flag of British Burma	
	1945 – 4 January 1948	Union Flag of the United Kingdom used as the state flag of British Burma	
	6 February 1939 – 30 March 1941	National flag of British Burma	British Blue Ensign with the Union Jack occupying one quarter of the field placed in the canton and defaced with the Badge of Burma: a peacock on a golden disc
	1945 – 3 January 1948	National flag of British Burma	British Blue Ensign with the Union Jack occupying one quarter of the field placed in the canton and defaced with the Badge of Burma: a peacock on a golden disc
	30 March 1941 – 1942	National flag of British Burma	Union Jack removed and the badge moved to centre
	1942–1943	Flag of Japanese occupied Burma	
	1 August 1943 – 1945	State flag of the State of Burma	
	1943–1945	Stylized variant flag of the State of Burma	
	4 January 1948 – 3 January 1974	Former national flag of the Union of Burma	A red field; in the upper hoist, a blue rectangular canton containing a big white star with five small white stars inside its rays. The vertical presentation places the canton at the upper left.
	3 January 1974–21 October 2010	Former state flag of the Socialist Republic of the Union of Burma (1974–1988) and the Union of Myanmar (1988–2010)	The background is a red field with a blue rectangular canton in the upper hoist. Inside the blue canton are the fourteen small white stars surrounding a paddy ear and a gear.

=== Governmental ===
Flag	Date	Use	Description
	1753–1885	Royal standard used in royal occasions by the Konbaung Dynasty	A red peacock sewn on a white silk flag
	1886–1937	Standard of the Viceroy and Governor-General of India	Union Jack with the Order of the Star of India in the centre, surmounted by the Tudor Crown.
	1939–1948	Standard of the Governor of Burma	Union Jack with the Badge of Burma in the centre
	1952–1974	Former government ensign of the Union of Burma	A blue field with the national flag in the canton.
	1948–1962	Former presidential flag of the Union of Burma	An orange field background charged with a peacock in the centre

=== Embassy ===
Flag	Date	Use	Description
	1949	Flag hoisted at the Embassy of the Union of Burma to the Republic of China in Nanjing	National flag with Palace city wall on lower fly

=== Civil ===
Flag	Date	Use	Description
	1886–1937	Civil Ensign of the British Raj used after the Annexation of Burma in 1886	British Red Ensign with the Union Jack occupying one quarter of the field placed in the canton and defaced with the Order of the Star of India.
	1952–1974	Former Civil Ensign of the Union of Burma	
	1974–2010	Former Civil Ensign of the Socialist Republic of the Union of Burma, later, the Union of Myanmar	

=== Military ===
==== Commander-in-Chief ====
Flag	Date	Use	Description
	1948–2010	Former flag of the Commander-in-Chief of Defence Services	Triband of light blue, red, and dark blue, and a large golden five-pointed star at the centre
	2010–2014	Former flag of the Commander-in-Chief of Defence Services	Triband of light blue, red, and dark blue, and a large golden five-pointed star at the centre
	1948 – c. 1994	Former flag of the Commander-in-Chief of the Army	Guidon with red-blue-red triband and a small white five-pointed star at the centre of the blue stripe
	1948–1974	Former flag of the Chief of Air Staff	Guidon with stratos background charged with the Air Force's roundel

==== War flags of the Royal Burmese Armed Forces ====
Flag	Name (in Burmese)	Description
	သတ္တရုဇေယ	Golden field charged with a central green disc with a latte rabbit on it
	မဟာသတ္တရု	Latte field charged with a bīlūḥ holding up both hands with weapons
	သတ္တရုဇမ္ဗူ	A horizontal triband of red, latte, and red; with a chinthe in the latte band.
	ရွှေပြည်လက်ဝဲ	A horizontal triband of red, blue, and red
	ရွှေပြည်ဝရဇိန်	A horizontal triband of blue, red, and blue
	ရွှေပြည်တမွတ်စံ	A horizontal triband of red, dark green, and red
	ရွှေပြည်မှန်ကင်း	A horizontal triband of red, slate blue, and red
	ရွှေပြည်နတ်	A horizontal triband of red, dark red, and red
	ရွှေပြည်စက်ထိ	A horizontal triband of yellow, white, and yellow
	ရွှေပြည်တံဆိပ်	A horizontal triband of green, yellow, and green

==== Army ====
Flag	Name (in Burmese)	Date	Use	Description
	သတ္တရုမြဇမ္ဗူ	c. 1784–1885	War flags of the Burmese Royal Armed Forces	Golden field charged with a central red disc with a golden peacock on it
		1853–1876	Flag used by European mercenaries from Burmese Royal Artillery	
		1942–1945	War flag of the Imperial Japanese Army in Burma	
		1941	(First) flag of the Burma Independence Army	A white field with a red peacock in the centre
		1942	(Second) flag of the Burma Independence Army	A green field with a peacock in the centre and thunderbolts in the corners
	သုံးရောင်ခြယ်အလံ	1942	(Third) flag of the Burma Independence Army	A horizontal triband of yellow, green, and red; charged with a peacock on a white disc at the centre
		1942–1945	Flag of the Burma Defence Army, later, the Burma National Army	A horizontal triband of yellow, green, and red; charged with a stylized red peacock at the centre
	တော်လှန်ရေးအလံ	1945	Flag of the anti-fascist resistance guerrillas and the Burma National Army, later, Patriotic Burmese Forces	A red field with a white five-pointed star in the upper hoist
		1948–c. 1994	Former flag of the Burma Army, later, Myanmar Army	A horizontal triband of red, blue, and red, charged with a small white five-pointed star at the centre of the blue stripe

==== Navy ====
Flag	Date	Use	Description
	1824–1942	Navy Ensign of the Royal Navy, in British Burma	British White Ensign: a white field defaced with the Saint George's Cross, and the Union Jack placed in the canton.
	1945 – 4 January 1948	Navy Ensign of the Royal Navy, in British Burma	British White Ensign: a white field defaced with the Saint George's Cross, and the Union Jack placed in the canton.
	1886–1937	Navy Jack of the British Indian Navy, used when Burma was a province of British India	British Blue Ensign with the Union Jack occupying one quarter of the field placed in the canton and defaced with the Order of the Star of India
	1942–1945	Former Navy ensign of the Imperial Japanese Navy in Burma	
	1948–1974	Former naval ensign of the Union of Burma Navy	A white field defaced with Saint George's Cross and the national flag's canton in the canton
	1974–1994	Former Naval Ensign of the Union of Burma Navy, later, the Myanmar Navy	A horizontal bicolour, sky blue over navy blue, with a large white five-pointed star at the centre

==== Air Force ====
Flag	Date	Use	Description
	1948–1974	Former Air Force ensign of the Burmese Air Force	
	1974 – c. 2010	Former Air Force ensign of the Burmese Air Force, later, the Myanmar Air Force	A bright blue field defaced with the Union Star in the upper hoist and the Myanmar Air Force roundel in the lower fly

=== Administrative divisions ===
==== States ====
Flag	Date	Use	Description
	1974–2010	Former flag of Kachin State	A dark blue field charged with mountains
	1974–2018	Former flag of Mon State	A blue field charged with a yellow hamsa in the centre and the text မွန်ပြည်နယ် (meaning "Mon State") underneath it
	1974–2010	Former flag of Kayah State	A kinnara centred on a red-blue-green horizontal triband; a small blue canton defaced on the red band; inside the canton, fourteen small white stars surrounding a paddy ear and a gear

==== Divisions / regions ====
Flag	Date	Use	Description
	1974–2010	Former flag of Ayeyarwady Division	An orange map of Ayeyarwady Region in a white box on top a field of white and blue waves with the text ဧရာဝတီတိုင်း ("Ayeyarwady Division") above the map
	2010–2022	Former flag of Ayeyarwady Division	Seal of Ayeyarwady Region with the text ဧရာဝတီတိုင်းဒေသကြီး ("Ayeyarwady Region") above on a white field
	1974–2010	Former flag of Bago Region	A blue field with a golden hamsa, and the text "ပဲခူးတိုင်း" ("Bago Division") under the bird
	2010 – c. 2019	Former flag of Bago Region	A blue field with a golden hamsa, and the text "ပဲခူးတိုင်းဒေသကြီး" ("Bago Region") under the bird
	1974–2010	Former flag of Magway Division	An orange field with the red text "မကွေးတိုင်း" (meaning "Magway Division")
	2010–2021	Former flag of Magway Division	A yellow field charged with former seal (2010–2021)
	1974–2010	Former flag of Mandalay Division	
	2010–2021	Flag of Mandalay Region	Seal of Mandalay Region on a red field. Is also the current flag.
	2021–2022	Flag of Mandalay Region	Seal of Mandalay Region on blue background
	1974–2010	Former flag of Sagaing Division	A green field with a yellow Burmese leograph and the yellow text "စစ်ကိုင်းတိုင်း" (meaning "Sagaing Division")
	2010–2019	Former flag of Sagaing Region	A red field with a Burmese leograph and the text "စစ်ကိုင်းတိုင်းဒေသကြီး" (meaning "Sagaing Region")
	1974–2010	Former flag of Tanintharyi Division	A dark blue field with the text "တနင်္သာရီတိုင်း" (meaning "Tanintharyi Division")
	1974–2010	Former flag of Yangon Division	
	2010–2022	Former flag of Yangon Region	

=== Political flags ===
Flag	Date	Party	Description
	2015–2019	Confederate Farmers Party	
	2014–2019	Kachin Democratic Party^{my}	
	2013–2019	Kachin State Democracy Party	
	2010–2014	Rakhine Nationalities Development Party	
	1962–1988	Burma Socialist Programme Party	
	1958–1964; 1945–1958	Union Party; Anti-Fascist People's Freedom League	
	1942–1943	Poor Man's Party	
	1930-1950s	Thakins	

=== Armed groups ===
Flag	Date	Use	Description
	1999–2013	Vigorous Burmese Student Warriors	
	1995–2005	Shan State National Army	
	1985–1996	Mong Tai Army	
	1978–2009	Karenni National People's Liberation Front	
	1964–1975	Shan State Army	
	1960–1996	Shan United Revolutionary Army	

== National flag proposals ==
Flag	Date	Use	Description
	Proposed in 2006	Flag proposed for Myanmar at the 2006 Plenary Session of the National Convention	A horizontal tricolour of green, yellow, and red, with a white five-pointed star in the canton
	Proposed in 2019	The National League for Democracy's proposal	A red field with a blue canton, in which there is a large white five-pointed star surrounded by a circle of fourteen small white five-pointed stars
	Proposed in 2019	The Shan Nationalities League for Democracy's proposal	A light blue field with a large white five-pointed star surrounded by a circle of eight small white five-pointed stars, with three horizontal stripes of yellow, green, and red in the hoist
	Proposed in 2019	The Zomi Congress for Democracy's proposal	A light blue field with a white map of Myanmar in the centre surrounded by an orange oval ring
	Proposed in 2019	The National United Democratic Party's proposal	A yellow-brown field with a black-bordered grey oval in the centre containing a map of Myanmar displaying the individual states and regions of the country in various colours

== Misattributed flags ==
Flag	Date	Use	Description
	2012?	Inaccurate flag of Myanmar as shown on the ASEAN ceremonial giant gong at Wat Ounalom Monastery in Phnom Penh, Cambodia	A horizontal triband of red, green, and yellow; charged with a large white five-pointed star at the centre. This version of the Myanmar state flag was inaccurate because the position of the red and yellow stripes were swapped. It was the only inaccurate flag on the gong, all the other ASEAN member states had their flags depicted correctly on it.
