= Ceasefires in Myanmar =

Ceasefires ratified by the Myanmar government

Ceasefires in Myanmar have been heavily utilized by the Burmese government as a policy to contain ethnic rebel groups and create tentative truces. The first ceasefire was arranged by the State Law and Order Restoration Council in 1989, specifically spearheaded by Khin Nyunt, then the Chief of Military Intelligence, with the Kokang-led National Democratic Alliance Army, which had recently split from the Communist Party of Burma due to internal conflicts.

== Background ==
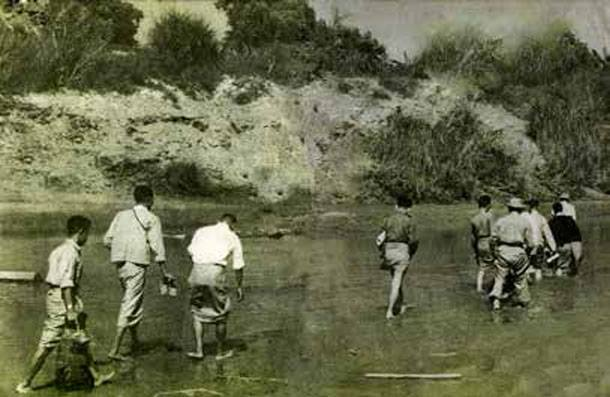
The November 1963 peace talks collapsed and members of the Communist Party of Burma's delegation are shown walking back to their bases after the end of conference in Rangoon.

The internal conflict in Myanmar began after the country's independence in 1948, as successive central governments of Myanmar (or Burma) fought myriad ethnic and political rebellions. Some of the earliest insurgencies were by Burmese-dominated "multi-colored" leftists, and by the Karen National Union (KNU). The KNU fought to carve out an independent Karen state from large swaths of Lower Myanmar. Other ethnic rebellions broke out in the early 1960s after the central government refused to consider a federal style government. By the early 1980s, politically oriented armed insurgencies had largely withered away, but ethnic-based insurgencies remained active during the conflict.

In the 1980s, rebel groups controlled most of the country's periphery. The two major organisations fighting against the Burma Socialist Programme Party-led government, were two umbrella groups, the pro-Chinese Communist Party of Burma (allied to local Kokang Chinese, Wa and Shan groups), based along the Chinese-Burmese border; and the pro-West National Democratic Force (made up of ethnic Mon, Karen, Karenni and Shan opposition groups), based along the Thai-Burmese border.

By the late 1980s, the Communist Party of Burma (CPB) had weakened considerably, because of waning Chinese financial support and internal strife. During the 1988 Uprising, the CPB failed to seize the opportunity to invoke political change. A month later, the State Law and Order Restoration Council (SLORC), a council of military men, staged a coup d'etat. Consequently, ethnic Wa and Kokang armed forces led a mutiny against CPB, forming the United Wa State Party (UWSP) and the National Democratic Alliance Army (NDAA) respectively. SLORC used this opportunity to arrange ceasefires with the armed rebel groups that had just mutinied, under a policy designed by Khin Nyunt, who was then the Chief of Military Intelligence. The deal fell short of its nationwide billing, with seven of the 15 armed groups invited declining to sign because of disagreements over who the process should include, and ongoing distrust of Myanmar's semi-civilian government and its still-powerful military.

== National Reconciliation after 1988 ==
Government troops heavily used four cuts counter-insurgency tactics in ethnic areas in the 1990s. Most ethnic groups became armed after the first military coup in 1962 and successive military governments used four cuts counter insurgency policy in ethnic areas. This policy involved: the cut off communications among rebel armed groups as well as local people; the cut off of information among people; the cut off of trade route in designated territories; searches and the destruction of any possible supplies to cut off these areas. On the other hand, the military government forced ethnic groups to sign ceasefire agreements with ethnic rebels groups, while government troops were trying to root out their main bases in 1990s. In meanwhile, ethnic minorities’ political parties which won seats in 1990 elections, and formed the second largest pro-democracy block after NLD, were severely oppressed in cities. By the end of the century, there were twenty armed opposition groups had cease fire agreements with governments. However, the government did not hold political discussions with these groups or winning political parties. Therefore, some ethnic groups continued their armed struggle against the government. The ethnic populations suffered the most the result of long-standing hostilities with the central government. They have been treated as enemies of the state and second class citizens

== Agreements ==
The signed ceasefire agreements have been nothing more than temporary military truces to suspend fighting and preserve the status quo, allowing the rebel groups to retain administrative control of their territories. Weaker or splinter rebel groups typically forfeit their territories to the government. Most agreements simply stipulated that the groups would be allowed to retain their arms and territories until the promulgation of a new constitution.

As part of the ceasefires, the government began the Border Area Development Programme in 1989, which became a ministry-level body in 1992, as the Ministry for the Progress of Border Areas and National Races and has built road infrastructure, schools, and hospitals in rebel-occupied territories.

On 31 March 2015, Burmese President Thein Sein signed a nationwide ceasefire draft along with many ethnic leaders and government officials.

=== Border Guard Forces ===
In April 2009, Lieutenant General Ye Myint led a government entourage to meet with Kokang, Shan and Wa insurgent groups, to discuss plans to create "collective security" formed by them and under the command of the Tatmadaw, which would eventually lead to the creation of the Border Guard Forces. In 2009, four of the insurgent groups, the Democratic Karen Buddhist Army, the Kachin Defence Army (4th Brigade of the KIA), the New Democratic Army - Kachin (NDA-K), and the Pa-O National Organisation/Army (PNO/A), accepted the transition plan's terms and transformed into BGF groups.

== List of ceasefires ==
Since 1989, the Burmese government has signed the following ceasefire agreements

Organisation	Region	Effective dates	Notes
Myanmar National Democratic Alliance Army (MNDAA)	Kokang, Shan State	21 March 1989 — 27 August 2009	Establishment of MNDAA-governed Shan State Special Region 1 Special region later incorporated as Kokang SAZ (2010–2024)
United Wa State Army (UWSA)	Wa State, Shan State	9 May 1989 —	Establishment of UWSA-governed Shan State Special Region 2 Special region later incorporated as Wa SAD (2010)
National Democratic Alliance Army (NDAA)	Eastern Shan State	30 June 1989 —	Establishment of NDAA-governed Eastern Shan State Special Region 4
Shan State Army (SSPP)	Special Region 3, Shan State	2 September 1989 —	
New Democratic Army - Kachin (NDA-K)	Northeast Kachin State	15 December 1989 —	Establishment of NDA-K-governed Kachin State Special Region 1 Transformed into Border Guard Force (BGF) November 2009
Kachin Defense Army (KDA)	Special Region 5, Northern Shan State	13 January 1991 —	Former 4th Brigade of the Kachin Independence Organisation; KDA dissolved in December 2023
Pa-O National Organisation (PNO)	Special Region 6, Southern Shan State	11 April 1991 —	Special region incorporated as Pa'O SAZ (2010)
Palaung State Liberation Army (PSLA)	Special Region 7, Northern Shan State	21 April 1991 — 2009	
Kayan National Guard (KNG)	Special Region 1, Kayah State	27 February 1992 —	Split from KNLP
Kachin Independence Organisation (KIO)	Special Region 2, Kachin State	24 February 1994 — 9 June 2011	
Karenni National People's Liberation Front (KNPLF)	Special Region 2, Kayah (Karenni) State	9 May 1994 — 13 June 2023	Transformed into BGF in November 2009
Kayan New Land Party (KNLP)	Special Region 3, Kayah (Karenni) State	26 July 1994 —	
Shan State Nationalities Peoples' Liberation Organisation (SSNPLO)	Southern Shan State	9 October 1994 —	
New Mon State Party (NMSP)	Mon State	29 June 1995 —	Breakaway faction annulled ceasefire in February 2024
Democratic Karen Buddhist Army (DKBA)/Karen National Army (KNA)	Karen State	December 1995 —	Transformed into BGF August 2009; Reformed as KNA in January 2024
Mongko Region Defence Army (MRDA)	Shan State	August 1995 —November 2000	
Shan State National Army (SSNA)	Shan State	1995 — May 2005	SSNA dissolved by May 2005
Karenni National Defence Army (KNDA)	Karen State	1996 —	Split from KNPP
Karen Peace Force (KPF)	Karen State	1997 —	Former 16th Battalion of the Karen National Union; Transformed into BGF August 2009 (alongside DKBA)
Communist Party of Burma (Arakan Province)(CPB)	Rakhine State	1997 —	
Mon Mergui Army (MMA)	Mon State	1997 —	Split from New Mon State Party
KNU Special Region Group Toungoo (KNU)	Bago Division	1997 —	
Karenni National Progressive Party (KNPP)	Kayah State	2005 — 2005	Ceasefire broke down within 3 months
Shan State Army - South (SSA-South) 758th Brigade	Shan State	2006 —	Split from RCSS/SSA
KNU/KNLA Peace Council (KNU/KNLA PC)	Karen State	2007 —	Former 7th Battalion of the Karen National Union
Democratic Karen Buddhist Army (DKBA) 3rd Brigade	Karen State	3 November 2011 —	Fighting resumed on 19 February 2012.
Klo Htoo Baw Battalion	Karen State	5 November 2011 —	
Chin National Front; Karen National Union; Shan State Army – South	-	19 November 2011 —	Informal ceasefire agreement; Despite a ceasefire agreement in place, fighting is still occurring between the Tatmadaw and SSA-South rebel troops, as of March 2012.
Chin National Front (CNF)	Chin State	8 January 2012 —	
Karen National Union (KNU)	Karen State	7 February 2012 —	
Restoration Council of Shan State (RCSS)	Shan State	17 January 2012 —	Political arm of Shan State Army
Shan State Progressive Party (SSPP)	Shan State	28 January 2012 —	Political arm of the Shan State Army
New Mon State Party (NMSP)	Mon State	31 January 2012 —	
Karenni National Progressive Party (KNPP)	Kayah State	6 March 2012 — 21 May 2021	
ABSDF; Arakan Liberation Party; Chin National Front; DKBA-5; Karen National Union; KNU/KNLA Peace Council; Lahu Democratic Union; New Mon State Party; Pa-O National Liberation Army; Restoration Council of Shan State	Nationwide	15 October 2015 —	Known as the Nationwide Ceasefire Agreement; Annulled by ABSDF, CNF, KNU, and factions of the NMSP and PNLA after the 2021 coup
Myanmar National Democratic Alliance Army; Ta'ang National Liberation Army	Northern Shan State	12 January 2024 — 24 June 2024	Known as Haigeng Ceasefire; Ended Operation 1027 Phase 1
Myanmar National Democratic Alliance Army	Kokang	19 January 2025 —	MNDAA relinquishes control of Lashio in April 2025
Ta'ang National Liberation Army	Northern Shan State	29 October 2025 —	TNLA agrees to relinquish control of Mogok and Momeik

== See also ==
- Union Peace Conference - 21st Century Panglong
