= 7 EAO Alliance =

Military coalition in Myanmar

- Dates active: 18 March 2024 – present
- Groups: New Mon State Party; Restoration Council of Shan State; Arakan Liberation Party; Pa-O National Liberation Army (excluding anti-junta faction); Lahu Democratic Union; Democratic Karen Buddhist Army; KNU/KNLA Peace Council
- Ideology: Federalism
- Wars: the internal conflict in Myanmar

The 7 EAO Alliance is a coalition of seven ethnic armed organizations (EAOs) in Myanmar.

== Details ==
Led by General Yawd Serk, the alliance includes signatories of the Nationwide Ceasefire Agreement (NCA) such as the Restoration Council of Shan State (RCSS), New Mon State Party (NMSP), Arakan Liberation Party (ALP), Pa-O National Liberation Organisation (PNLO), Lahu Democratic Union (LDU), Democratic Karen Benevolent Army (DKBA), and Karen National Union/Karen National Liberation Army-Peace Council (KNU/KNLA-PC). The objectives pursued by the 7 EAO Alliance include: establishing a federal democratic union, fostering peace through political dialogue, engaging in negotiations with stakeholders, and addressing the country's political crisis. The 7 EAO Alliance was formed on 18 March 2024.

On 3 December 2025, the leader of KNU/KNLA PC, Saw Kyaw Nyunt, called for Aung San Suu Kyi (who was imprisoned after the 2021 Myanmar coup d'etat) to be included as a "key stakeholder [in addressing the nationwide crisis]."
