= Arakan Army (disambiguation) =

Arakan Army is a Rakhine insurgent group in Myanmar. The name is likely to be confused with:

- Arakan Army (Kayin State)
- Arakan Liberation Army
- Arakan Rohingya Army
- Arakan Rohingya Salvation Army
