= United Nationalities Federal Council =

Opposition coalition in Myanmar

United Nationalities Federal Council ညီညွတ်သောတိုင်းရင်းသားလူမျိုးများဖက်ဒရယ်ကောင်စီ
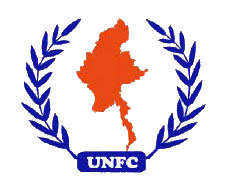
- Abbreviation: UNFC
- Chairman: Nai Hong Sar (since 2017); N'Ban La (2011–2016)
- Founded: 16 February 2011
- Preceded by: Ethnic Nationalities Council
- Headquarters: Chiang Mai, Thailand
- Armed wing: Federal Union Army
- Ideology: Federalism; Ethnic minority rights
- Member parties: Arakan Army; Karenni Army; Lahu Democratic Union; New Mon State Party; Shan State Army - North

Party flag

Website
- Official website

The United Nationalities Federal Council (Burmese: ညီညွတ်သောတိုင်းရင်းသားလူမျိုးများဖက်ဒရယ်ကောင်စီ; abbreviated UNFC) is a coalition of five opposition groups in Myanmar. In 2011, the council was formed by 11 opposition groups that campaigns for the rights of various ethnic minorities in Myanmar. Six of the UNFC's members have successfully made or are in the process of making peace negotiations and permanent ceasefire agreements with the government. The group's armed wing is the Federal Union Army (FUA).

== Membership ==
The UNFC currently has five members.

=== Ceasefire members ===
- Lahu Democratic Union
- New Mon State Party
- Shan State Army - North

=== Non-ceasefire members ===
- Arakan Army
- Karenni National Progressive Party
- Chin National Front (suspended in November 2015)
- Kachin Independence Army (resigned in May 2017)
- Karen National Union (resigned in September 2014)
- Myanmar National Democratic Alliance Army (resigned in 2016)
- Pa-O National Liberation Army (suspended in November 2015)
- Ta'ang National Liberation Army (resigned in 2016)
- Wa National Organisation (resigned in May 2017)

== Leadership ==
- Chief: Nai Hong Sar (NMSP)
- Vice-chief: Naing Han Tha (NMSP)
- Secretary: Khu Oo Yel (KNPP)
- Co-secretary: U Tun Zaw (ANC)
