= Bawmwang La Raw =

Kachin politician (1955–2021)

Duwa Bawmwang La Raw
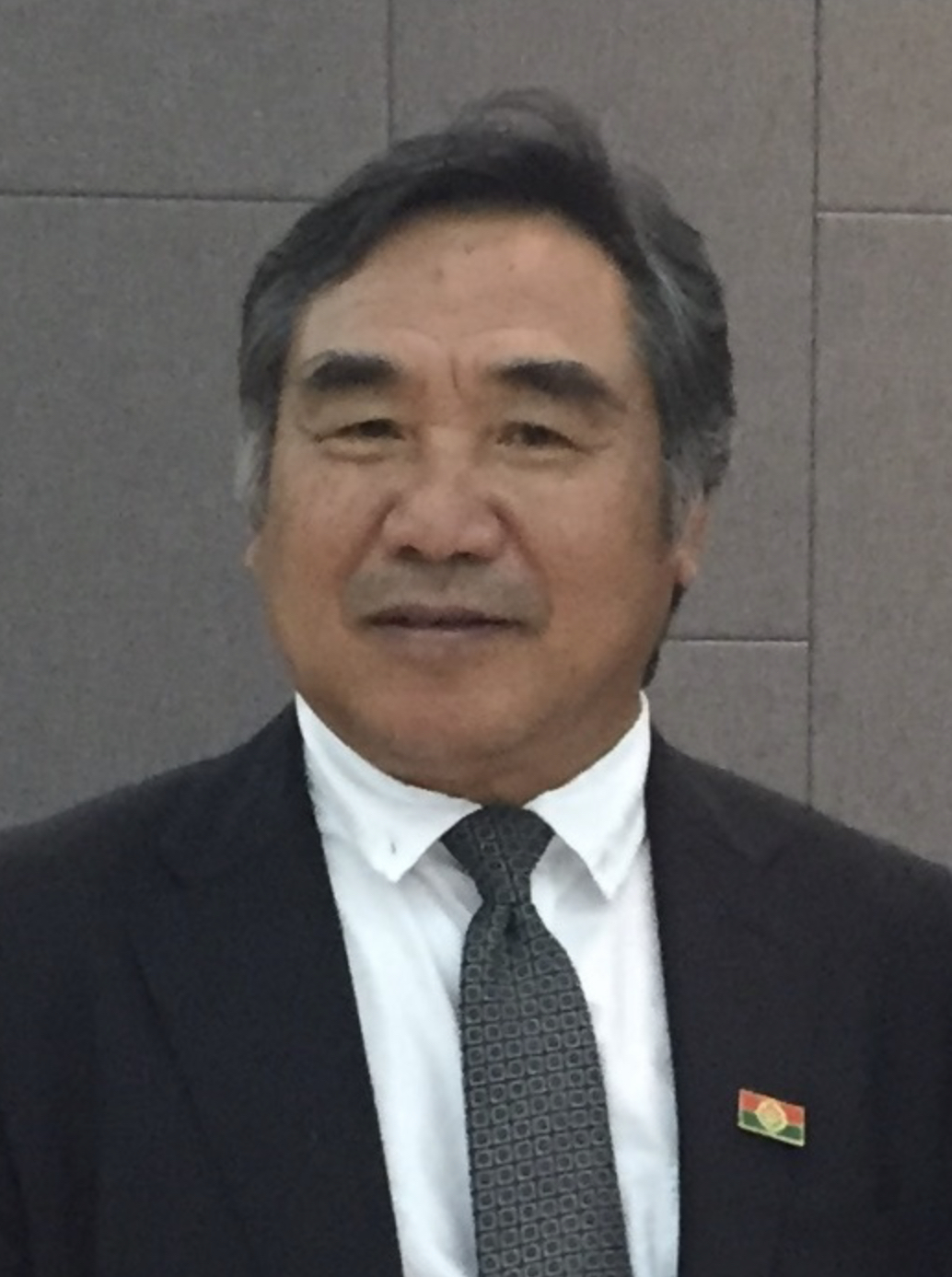
- Born: 10 December 1955; Bawmwang Village, Burma
- Died: 16 October 2021 (aged 65); Bedford Hospital, United Kingdom
- Occupations: Politician, businessman
- Known for: Founder of the Kachin National Organisation
- Spouse: Du Jan Wabaw Ja Nan
- Children: 5

Duwa Bawmwang La Raw (10 December 1955 – 16 October 2021) was a Kachin politician, businessman, and the founder of the Kachin National Organisation (KNO). He was a prominent figure in the Kachin independence movement and played a significant role in advocating for the rights and freedom of the Kachin people.

== Early life ==
Duwa Bawmwang La Raw was born on 10 December 1955 in Bawmwang Village, Burma (now Myanmar), to Duwa Bawmwang Sinwa Li and Du Jan Htingnan Ja Hka. He was the third son and fifth child in a family of nine siblings. From a young age, he was taught traditional skills such as hunting, fishing, and land management by his father.

== Career ==
In his youth, La Raw became involved in the Kachin Independence Organisation (KIO) and the Kachin Independence Army (KIA), working under leaders like Brigadier General Zau Tu and General Secretary Hpungshwi Zau Seng. He was arrested and imprisoned by the Burmese Army for his involvement in the independence movement but later escaped to Thailand in 1989.

La Raw became a successful businessman in the jade trade and used his wealth to support the Kachin independence movement, as well as humanitarian and church-related causes. He worked closely with KIO Chairman Maran Brang Seng and continued to advise the KIO/KIA leadership after Brang Seng's death.

In 1994, he co-founded the Pan Kachin Development Society (PKDS) to support Kachin communities globally. On 9 January 1999, he established the Kachin National Organisation (KNO) to promote Kachin nationalism and independence. He also served in various leadership roles in organizations like the Ethnic Nationalities Council (ENC), the Federal Democracy Council (FDC), and the United Nationalities Federal Council (UNFC).

La Raw was a passionate advocate for Kachin independence and cultural preservation. He sponsored patriotic Kachin music, organized Manau festivals, and founded schools in Kachin State. He also authored articles for the magazine Langji U e Pyen Yu Su, which focused on Kachin political and cultural issues.

== Death ==
La Raw returned to the United Kingdom from Thailand in September 2021 after surviving two COVID-19 lockdowns. He received his first COVID-19 vaccine shortly after arriving but soon fell seriously ill. He was admitted to the ICU at Bedford Hospital, where he died on 16 October 2021 due to complications from COVID-19.
