= Federal Union Army =

- ဖက်ဒရယ် ပြည်ထောင်စု တပ်မတော်
- Dates active: 16 February 2011 – present
- Groups: Arakan Army; Karenni Army; Kuki National Army; Lahu Democratic Union; New Mon State Party; Shan State Army – North
- Active regions: Kayah State; Kayin State; Shan State; Chin State
- Ideology: Federalism; Ethnic minority rights
- Size: 10,000+ total fighters
- Part of: United Nationalities Federal Council
- Wars: the internal conflict in Myanmar

The Federal Union Army (Burmese: ဖက်ဒရယ် ပြည်ထောင်စု တပ်မတော်) is a military coalition in Myanmar (Burma) composed of fighters from various insurgent groups which are members of the United Nationalities Federal Council (UNFC). It was established by the UNFC to protect areas with ethnic minorities.

== Membership ==
The UNFC, the parent organisation of the FUA, currently has five members. Fighters in the FUA come from some of, but not all of, the member parties.

=== Ceasefire members ===
- Chin National Front (suspended in November 2015)
- Karen National Union (resigned in September 2014)
- Karenni Army
- Lahu Democratic Union
- New Mon State Party
- Pa-O National Organization (suspended in November 2015)
- Shan State Army - North

=== Non-ceasefire members ===
- Arakan Army
- Kachin Independence Army (resigned in May 2017)
- Kuki National Army
- Ta'ang National Liberation Army (resigned in 2016)
- Wa National Organisation (resigned in May 2017)
- Zomi Revolutionary Army
