= Union Peace Conference – 21st Century Panglong =

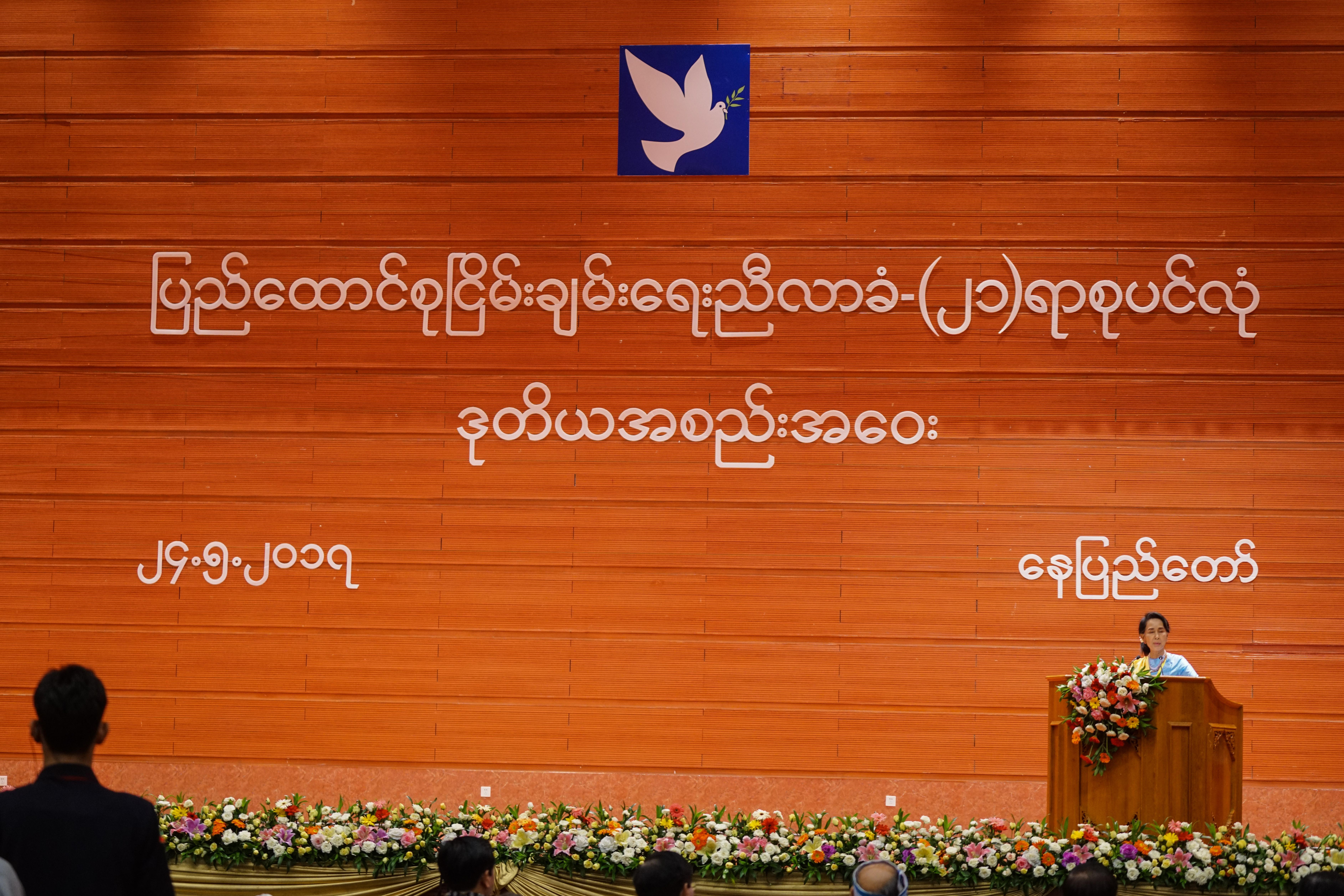
State Counsellor Aung San Suu Kyi makes her opening speech at the peace conference.

The Union Peace Conference – 21st Century Panglong (Burmese: ပြည်ထောင်စု ငြိမ်းချမ်းရေးညီလာခံ (၂၁) ရာစု ပင်လုံ) was a peace conference, the first session of which was held from 31 August to 4 September 2016 at the Myanmar Convention Centre 2 in Naypyidaw, Myanmar (Burma). Three follow-up sessions were held in May 2017, July 2018, and August 2020.

The first Panglong Conference was held in the Panglong region of British Burma in 1947, and was negotiated between Aung San and ethnic leaders. As of August 2020, ten ethnic armed organizations have signed the Nationwide Ceasefire Agreement (NCA).

Eighteen ethnic insurgent groups attended the first session of the conference, whilst three ethnic insurgent groups (The Arakan Army, the Myanmar National Democratic Alliance Army, and the Ta'ang National Liberation Army), who were actively engaged in armed conflict with the national army, did not attend. Ban Ki-moon, the Secretary-General of the United Nations, also attended the opening ceremony. The United Wa State Army left the conference early, saying they were only permitted observer status. The government planned to continue the conference sessions semiannually, until a permanent ceasefire and peace agreement was implemented. Originally, only signatories of the NCA would be permitted to attend, although this requirement was subsequently scrapped. The original schedule was optimistic and the second session was not held until May of 2017.

The first session of the conference was chaired by Lt. Gen. Yar Pyae from the Tatmadaw, Tin Myo Win from the union government, Shila Nang Dong from the parliament, Khun Myint Tun from the ethnic armed organisations (EAOs) and Myint Soe from the political parties. The EAOs called for a federal system that "guarantees justice, equality, self-administration and protection of racial, religious and political rights of ethnic minorities."

On 15 October 2016, the Burmese government announced their "Seven Steps Roadmap for National Reconciliation and Union Peace". The goals are:

1. To review the political dialogue framework
2. To amend the political dialogue framework
3. To convene the Union Peace Conference—the 21st Century Panglong in accordance with the amended and approved political dialogue framework
4. To sign union agreement— the 21st Century Panglong Conference Agreement based on the results of the 21st Century Panglong Conference
5. To amend the constitution in accordance with the union agreement and approve the amended constitution
6. To hold the multi-party democracy general elections in accordance with the amended and approved constitution
7. To build a democratic federal union in accordance with the results of the multi-party democracy general elections

== See also ==
- Ceasefires in Myanmar
- Internal conflict in Myanmar
