= Danu People's Liberation Army =

Danu armed group in Myanmar

- ဓနုပြည်သူ့လွတ်မြောက်ရေးတပ်တော်
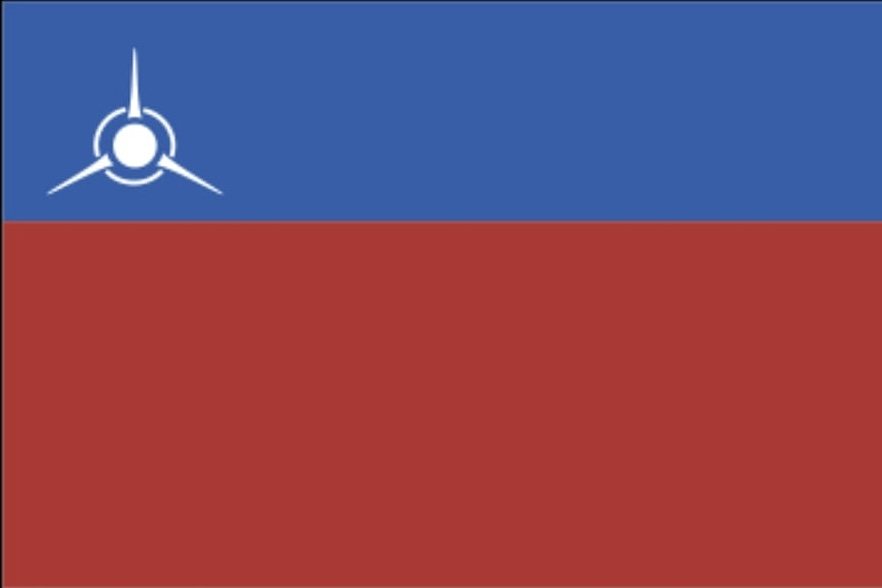
- Flags of the Danu People's Liberation Front/Army
- Dates active: 7 August 2022 – present
- Active regions: Danu Self-Administered Zone, Shan State, Myanmar
- Size: ~500
- Part of: Danu People's Liberation Front
- Wars: the internal conflict in Myanmar

The Danu People's Liberation Army (Burmese: ဓနုပြည်သူ့လွတ်မြောက်ရေးတပ်တော်) is a Danu ethnic armed organisation in Myanmar. It was established on 7 August, 2022, as the armed wing of the Danu People's Liberation Front. It is active in the Danu Self-Administered Zone, and several areas of northern Shan State. It participated in both phase 1 and 2 of Operation 1027 alongside the Ta'ang National Liberation Army, notably attacking Burmese Tatmadaw forces around Kyaukku, Lawksawk Township.
