= Monland Restoration Army =

- Leader: Nai Pan Nyunt
- Dates active: 2001–2012
- Headquarters: Sangkhlaburi, Thailand
- Active regions: Mon State; Tanintharyi Region
- Ideology: Mon nationalism Separatism
- Size: 100–300
- Wars: the Internal conflict in Myanmar

The Monland Restoration Army (MRA) is the armed wing of the Monland Restoration Party (MRP), which was known as the Hongsawatoi Restoration Party (HRP) until 2003. The MRP campaigns for the rights and equality of the Mon people in Myanmar (Burma). Its name is sometimes translated as 'Monland Defence Army'.

== History ==
The Monland Restoration Army split from the Mon National Liberation Army (MNLA), the armed wing of the New Mon State Party (NMSP), incorporating the Mon National Defence Army (MNDA) on 29 November 2001. Its founder was Nai Pan Nyunt, a captain of the MNLA.

At the time of its foundation this armed group had about 300 troops which were active in the Three Pagodas Pass area of the Tenasserim Hills, collecting taxes, laying landmines and intimidating local villagers into co-operation. Later it engaged in sporadic fights against the Tatmadaw following the alleged killing of a Tatmadaw colonel. After 2002 the MRA was expelled from the MNLA controlled areas and Nai Pan Nyunt went to the mountains near Sangkhlaburi where he tried to negotiate with Thai authorities. In January 2011 the former Mon National Defence Army troops (MNDA) of the MRA reunited with the NMSP, whose armed wing they had left in 2001.
