= Shan State Army (RCSS) =

Insurgent group in Myanmar

- တပ်ႉသိုၵ်းၸိုင်ႈတႆး – ပွတ်းၸၢၼ်း
- Flag of the Shan State Army (RCSS)
- Leader: Lt. Gen. Yawd Serk (1996–2014)
- Dates active: 26 January 1996 – present
- Country: Myanmar
- Headquarters: Loi Tai Leng, Shan State, Myanmar
- Active regions: Shan State, Myanmar–China border, Myanmar–Thailand border
- Ideology: Shan nationalism Federalism
- Size: 12,000
- Part of: Restoration Council of Shan State
- Wars: the Internal conflict in Myanmar

The Shan State Army (Shan: တပ်ႉသိုၵ်းၸိုင်ႈတႆး – ပွတ်းၸၢၼ်း; abbreviated SSA or RCSS/SSA), also known as the Shan State Army – South (SSA-S) (Note: To distinguish it from the Shan State Army (SSPP) (SSA – North)), is the armed wing of the Restoration Council of Shan State (RCSS) and one of the largest insurgent groups in Myanmar (Burma). The RCSS/SSA was led by Lieutenant General Yawd Serk until his resignation on 3 February 2014. Yawd Serk was reelected chairman of the RCSS shortly after his resignation and has remained chairman since.

== History ==
In 1996, Lieutenant General Yawd Serk of the Shan United Revolutionary Army (SURA) led 800 soldiers under his command to central Shan State and established the Shan State Army, after he refused to surrender to government forces with fellow commander Khun Sa. He then recruited roughly a thousand more soldiers before returning to southern Shan State to establish the group's headquarters in Loi Tai Leng.

In 2000, the SSA formed the Restoration Council of Shan State (RCSS) as its political wing, and elected eleven Central Executive Committee members to lead the political front. Yawd Serk was elected chairman of the RCSS, and would remain in office until his resignation on 3 February 2014.

In 2005, the RCSS/SSA pledged to work with the Shan State National Army (SSNA) against the then ruling military junta to achieve independence for Shan State. Later that year, the SSNA agreed to merge with the RCSS/SSA.

In 2008, the Shan State Congress (SSC) was formed in Loi Tai Leng under the aegis of Yawd Serk, which would exist until 2010. Its members included groups such as the Lahu Democratic Union (LDU), the Pa-O National Liberation Organisation (PNLO), the Restoration Council of Shan State, Tai Coordination Committee (TCC) and the Wa National Organisation (WNO).

Before the establishment of the SSC, the RCSS/SSA maintained a six-member alliance with the Arakan Liberation Party (ALP), the Chin National Front (CNF), the Kachin National Organisation (KNO), the Karen National Union (KNU) and the Karenni National Progressive Party (KNPP). Yawd Serk expressed his desire to revive the alliance ahead of the 2010 general election.

On 16 January 2012, the government and the RCSS/SSA signed a mutual agreement with the following 11 points:

1. To allow RCSS/SSA headquarters in Homain sub-township and Mong Hta sub-township
2. To negotiate and arrange the resettlement of RCSS/SSA troops and their families in the locations mentioned in the first point
3. The appointment by the RCSS/SSA of village heads in the region, which would work with government official for township administration;
4. Government soldiers in Homain sub-township and Mong Hta sub-township will give help to the RCSS/SSA
5. Both sides will discuss and negotiate to arrange for the security of RCSS/SSA leaders
6. Government troops and the RCSS/SSA would negotiate to designate areas where they could enter border areas;
7. Each side agreed to inform the other side in advance if one side wants to enter the other's control area with weapons
8. To open liaison offices between the government and the RCSS/SSA in Taunggyi, Kholam, Kengtung, Mong Hsat and Tachileik and trading offices in Muse and Nanhkam
9. Government ministers will arrange for RCSS/SSA members to run businesses and companies in accord with existing policies, by providing aid and the required technology
10. To cooperate with the union government for regional development
11. To cooperate with the government in making plan for battling drug trafficking

In February 2021, the Tatmadaw attacked RCSS’s camps in Hsipaw Township, breaking the Nationwide Ceasefire Agreement according to the RCSS.

On 30 November 2023, the RCSS/SSA declared a truce with Shan State Army (SSPP).

On 19 February 2024, the RCSS stated that it is enforcing a draft order for citizens aged 18–45 who are living in its territory to serve at least six years in the SSA, and threatened to seize land and property for those who avoid it.

On 20 September 2024, Tatmadaw forces purportedly backed by Lahu militias attacked an RCSS base in Mongping.

== Territory ==
The SSA has main 5 bases established across the Myanmar-Thailand border:

- Loi Tai Leng – its main base of operations, near Pang Mapha District, Mae Hong Son Province, Thailand
- Loi Moong Merng – near Muang District, Mae Hong Son Province, Thailand
- Loi Lam – near Wiang Haeng District, Chiang Mai Province, Thailand
- Loi Hsarm Hsip – near Fang District, Chiang Mai Province, Thailand
- Loi Gaw wann – near Mae Fa Luang District, Chiang Rai Province, Thailand
