= Shan State Communist Party =

Shan State Communist Party ရှမ်းပြည်နယ် ကွန်မြူနစ်ပါတီ
- Abbreviation: SSCP
- Chairman: Bo Hla Min
- Politburo members: Bo Min Thaung; Bo Tun Lin; Bo Moe Hein
- Regional committee members: Saw Lwin; Ba Din; Ohn Pwint; Hlaw Ywet Kan
- Founded: 1956
- Dissolved: 10 May 1958
- Ideology: Communism; Shan nationalism
- Political position: Far-left
- Colours: Red

The Shan State Communist Party (SSCP; Burmese: ရှမ်းပြည်နယ် ကွန်မြူနစ်ပါတီ) was a communist party in Shan State, Burma (present-day Myanmar). The party was founded in 1956 by Moh Heng, a commander of the Communist Party of Burma in Lawksawk, in protest of a decision by the CPB leadership to reject the creation of a separate party committee for Shan State.

The party leadership consisted of Bo Hla Min (chairman), Bo Min Thaung (politburo member), Bo Tun Lin (politburo member), Bo Moe Hein (politburo member), Saw Lwin (regional committee member), Ba Din (regional committee member), Ohn Pwint (regional committee member) and Hlaw Ywet Kan (regional committee member).

On 10 May 1958, 251 armed fighters and 150 other party members surrendered to the government.
