= Mon National Liberation Army =

Insurgent group in Myanmar

- Mon: ဒပ်ပၞာန်ဗၠးၜးကောန်ဂကူမန် Burmese: မွန်အမျိုးသား လွတ်မြောက်ရေး တပ်မတော်
- Flag of the NMSP/MNLA
- Dates active: July 1958 – present
- Headquarters: Ye Chaung Phya, Mon State
- Active regions: Mon State; Tanintharyi Region
- Ideology: Mon nationalism Federalism
- Size: 1500+
- Part of: New Mon State Party
- Wars: the Internal conflict in Myanmar

The Mon National Liberation Army (Mon: ဒပ်ပၞာန်ဗၠးၜးကောန်ဂကူမန်; Burmese: မွန်အမျိုးသား လွတ်မြောက်ရေး တပ်မတော်; abbreviated MNLA) is a Mon insurgent group in Myanmar (Burma). It is the armed wing of the New Mon State Party (NMSP), and has been fighting government forces since 1949, though under different names. The NMSP signed the Nationwide Ceasefire Agreement (NCA) on 15 October 2015 with several other insurgent groups and the government of Myanmar.

== History ==
The Mon National Liberation Army was established as the New Mon State Party's armed wing on 29 August 1971. Early on, the MNLA was mainly made up of ex-soldiers of the Mon People's Front, and Mons from villages and universities, and had the goal of promoting Mon autonomy and culture.

=== Conflict against the State Peace and Development Council ===
When the State Peace and Development Council (SPDC) led by Saw Maung seized power in 1988, the MNLA was among the numerous ethnic armies that opposed his rule. The MNLA then seized the area around the Three Pagodas Pass following fighting with the Tatmadaw, but had the territory lost to the Tatmadaw in 1990. Fighting in the Three Pagodas Pass resulted in an exodus of Mon civilians, including in July 1994 where 6,000 Mons fled to Thailand following an attack by the Tatmadaw on a refugee camp. In 1995, the NMSP agreed to a ceasefire, temporarily ending fighting between the SPDC and MNLA.

Based on the 1995 ceasefire, there are 12 areas through Mon State, Kayah State, and Tanintharyi Region prohibited for the Burmese military to enter.

=== Tensions with the Aung San Suu Kyi government ===
On 17 June 2016, the Tatmadaw carried a surprise raid on a MNLA base in Kyaikmayaw township. The MNLA has maintained bases in the Kyaikmayaw township since 2005 and the area has generally been peaceful up until the raid. Tensions had been growing between the MNLA and the Tatmadaw over monetary donations from villagers to the MNLA. The Tatmadaw has also ordered the withdrawal of the MNLA from bases in Mudon, Thanbyuzayat and Kyaikmayaw townships over claims that they were beyond what was permitted in the 1995 ceasefire renewed in 2012.

On 27 November 2019, the Tatmadaw and Karen Border Guard Force troops seized MNLA bases around the Three Pagodas Pass, causing the exodus of 700 Mon refugees into Thailand. They subsequently returned one base on 3 December. The MNLA has called the Tatmadaw's actions as violating the Nationwide Ceasefire Agreement and said that it was prepared to withdrawal from the agreement.

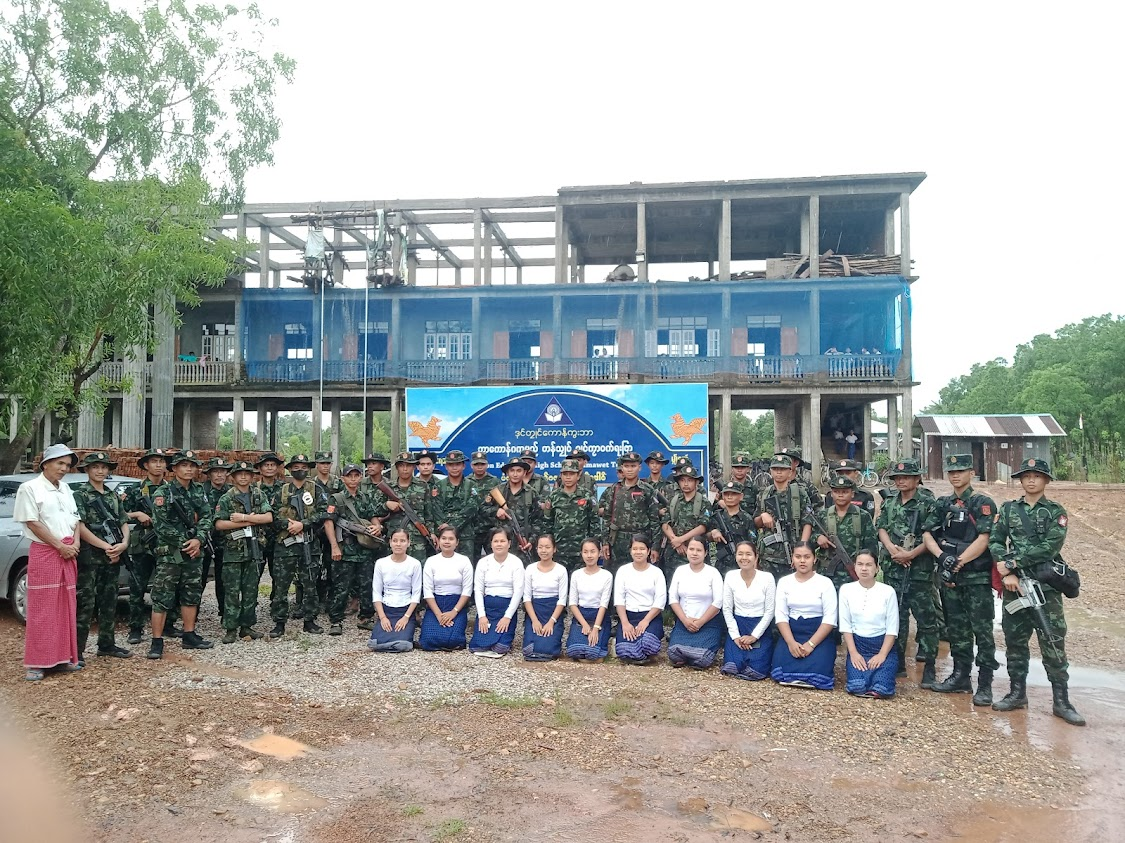
MNLA soldiers in August 2023

=== Conflict against the KNLA ===
Tensions between the MNLA and Karen National Liberation Army (KNLA), the armed wing of the Karen National Union (KNU), date back to 1988 over disputes in the Tanintharyi Region, particularly over territory around the Three Pagodas Pass, which the MNLA had held in the 1980s until it was taken back by the Myanmar army in 1990. However, the conflict died down when both agreed to stop fighting following negotiations mediated by National Democratic Front in the 1990s.

Yet fighting resumed when in September 2016, MNLA fighters began clashing with members of the KNLA in the Tanintharyi Region. The MNLA and KNLA continued to clash on 20 December 2016 near Mann Aung despite a meeting between senior leaders of the MNLA and KNLA to find a peaceful solution following the first clash in September.

Tensions between the MNLA and KNLA increased in January to March 2018 over logging. Logging in the area had been banned by the NMSP to prevent deforestation, but local villagers had been given permission to log trees by the 16th battalion of the KNLA. To the MNLA, the logging had been done illegally and on 13 January the MNLA arrested 48 workers. Between February and March, the MNLA ambushed the KNLA three times in Kawkareik, Myeik and Dawei districts. Another MNLA ambush occurred on 24 February 2018 near Mann Aung. On 9 March, a clash occurred between the two in a rubber plantation near the MNLA camp at Alel Sakhan.

Both the NMSP and the KNU were signatories of the NCA at the time of the fighting and a temporary bilateral truce was reached between the two groups on 14 March 2018.

NMSP resumed new clashes with KNLA in Mon State border with Kayin State in October 2019 but leaders from the two sides swiftly agreed to halt hostilities.

== 2024 Split ==
On 14 February 2024, a splinter group named "New Mon State Party (Anti-Military Dictatorship)" announced that they will no longer negotiate with the junta and will be joining hands with the revolutionary forces, effectively declaring war on the junta. This decision was made during the Myanmar civil war. The MNLA-AMD and its political wing, the New Mon State Party (Anti-Dictatorship), made up of senior MNLA officials, stated that they had broken away due to junta attacks on Mon areas and would only be active in areas the MNLA was not. On 25 February, the spokesman for the NMSP-AD declared the group's intention to unite with local resistance forces.
