= New Mon State Party (Anti-Military Dictatorship) =

Ethnic armed group in Myanmar

- Mon: ဗော်ဍုင်မန်တၟိ (ဗ္တိုက်သရိုဟ်တၠအဝဵုပၞာန်); Burmese: မွန်ပြည်သစ်ပါတီ (စစ်အာဏာရှင်တိုက်ဖျက်ရေး)
- Flag of the Ramonnya Mon Army
- Leaders: Nai Zeya; Salun Htaw; Nai Banyar
- Dates active: 2024-present
- Split from: New Mon State Party
- Active regions: Mudon Township, Mon State; Kyain Seikgyi Township, Kayin State
- Ideology: Mon nationalism Federalism
- Size: 1,500
- Wars: Myanmar Civil War (ongoing)

The New Mon State Party (Anti-Military Dictatorship) is a splinter group of the New Mon State Party. Its military wing is the Ramonnya Mon Army.

== History ==
On 14 February 2024, a splinter group named "New Mon State Party (Anti-Military Dictatorship)" announced that they will no longer negotiate with the junta and will be joining hands with the revolutionary forces, effectively declaring war on the junta. This decision was made during the Myanmar civil war. The MNLA-AMD and its political wing, the New Mon State Party (Anti-Dictatorship), made up of senior MNLA officials, stated that they had broken away due to junta attacks on Mon areas and would only be active in areas the MNLA was not. On 25 February, the spokesman for the NMSP-AD declared the groups intention to unite with local resistance forces.

=== Post-split ===
In March 2024, the MNLA-AD participated in their first military operation -the battle of Kawt Bein- alongside other resistance. Resistance captured the town on 25 March before being forced to withdraw a month later.

On 6 October 2024, Mon National Liberation Army Battalion-5, headquartered near Payathonzu, defected and joined the NMSP-AD. The next month, the NMSP-AD announced its intention -alongside the Mon Liberation Army (MLA), Mon State Revolutionary Force (MSRF), and Mon State Defense Force (MSDF)- to cooperate with other Mon resistance and intensify offensive operations.

During a meeting on 19 December, the NMSP-AD, alongside the MLA, MSDF, and MSRF, agreed to take steps to establish a unified Mon Army. To test the feasibility of unification, on 20 January 2025, the NMSP-AD and the other 3 forces agreed to contribute soldiers into a joint force: the Ramanya Joint Column. Each Mon group would contribute 25 soldiers, the column having 100 soldiers in total. The Mon groups also contributed 2 representatives each to the commanding committee, with an NMSP-AD representative being the senior-most officer.

On 24 May 2025, the military wing of the NMSP-AD, the MNLA-AD, and MLA merged into the Ramonnya Mon Army.

The Ramanya Joint Column was disbanded on 19 June due to complications regarding the NMSP-AD/MLA merge. The groups involved stated discussions were ongoing to reassess the columns structure.
