= Rohingya Liberation Party =

Insurgent group in Myanmar (1972–1974)

- Leaders: Zaffar Kawal; Abdul Latif; Muhammad Jafar Habib
- Dates active: 1972–1974
- Headquarters: Buthidaung
- Active regions: Rakhine State
- Ideology: Rohingya nationalism Islamism
- Size: 800–2,500
- Wars: the Rohingya conflict

The Rohingya Liberation Party (RLP) was a Rohingya political organization in Rakhine State, Myanmar (formerly Arakan, Burma). It had an armed wing called the Rohingya Liberation Army, which was led by a former mujahideen leader named Zaffar Kawal.

== History ==
On 15 July 1972, mujahideen leader Zaffar Kawal founded the Rohingya Liberation Party after mobilising various mujahideen factions under his command. Zaffar appointed himself Chairman of the party, Abdul Latif as Vice Chairman and Minister of Military Affairs, and Muhammad Jafar Habib as the Secretary General, a graduate from the University of Yangon. Their strength increased from 200 fighters in the beginning to up to 2,500 by 1974. The RLP was largely based in the jungles of Buthidaung. After a massive military operation by the Tatmadaw (Myanmar Armed Forces) in July 1974, Zaffar and most of his men fled across the border into Bangladesh.

== See also ==
- Rohingya Solidarity Organisation
