= Communist Party of Arakan =

Insurgent group in Myanmar (1962–2004)

Communist Party of Arakan ရခိုင်ပြည်ကွန်မြူနစ်ပါတီ
- Abbreviation: CPA
- Founders: Kyaw Zan Rhee; Bo Maung Han
- Founded: 1962
- Dissolved: 2004
- Split from: Red Flag Communist Party
- Headquarters: Arakan, Burma (present-day Rakhine State, Myanmar)
- Ideology: Communism; Marxism–Leninism; Arakanese self-determination
- Political position: Far-left

The Communist Party of Arakan (CPA), also known as the Arakanese Communist Party (ACP), was a communist party and armed insurgent group active in Arakan, Burma (present-day Rakhine State, Myanmar). It was founded in 1962 after a faction under the leadership of Arakanese political leaders Kyaw Zan Rhee and Bo Maung Han broke away from the Red Flag Communist Party (RFCP).

== History ==
In 1962, regional leaders of the RFCP in Arakan, discontent with the leadership of the central committee, decided to split from the party. A faction under the leadership of Kyaw Zan Rhee and Bo Maung Han broke away and established the Communist Party of Arakan (CPA), calling for an independent Marxist–Leninist Arakan.

After General Ne Win seized power in a 1962 military coup, the CPA was invited to peace talks in Rangoon (present-day Yangon) along with other communist groups, most notably the Communist Party of Burma (CPB) and the RFCP. The negotiations ultimately failed due to the reluctance of the new socialist government to give concessions, and in November 1963 the CPA resumed its insurgent activities against the military.

In 1986, the CPA was involved in heavy clashes with local police in the town of Minbya, briefly occupying the town centre and seizing weapons and two million kyats in cash. Many of the CPA's fighters were killed or captured after the Tatmadaw (armed forces) launched a military offensive against them in response to the fighting in Minbya. Relatives of CPA members and suspected communist sympathisers in the area were arrested; some of the women amongst those arrested were allegedly raped by authorities.

A faction of the CPA splintered off in 1994 and merged with three other insurgent groups to form the National United Party of Arakan (NUPA). In 2004, the remnants of the CPA dissolved themselves and merged with the NUPA.

On 11 May 2026, Maung Saw Yin, a major in the CPA, died of illness in Bangladesh at the age of 77.
