= Nationwide Ceasefire Agreement =

Pact between Myanmar's government and ethnic insurgent groups

Nationwide Ceasefire Agreement between the Government of the Republic of the Union of Myanmar and the Ethnic Armed Organisations
- Drafted: 31 March 2015
- Signed: 15 October 2015
- Location: Nay Pyi Taw, Myanmar
- Signatories: Myanmar; ABSDF; Arakan Liberation Party; Chin National Front; DKBA-5; Karen National Union; KNU/KNLA Peace Council; Lahu Democratic Union; New Mon State Party; Pa-O National Liberation Army; Restoration Council of Shan State
- Depositary: Government of Myanmar
- Languages: English, Burmese

The Nationwide Ceasefire Agreement (NCA), officially the Nationwide Ceasefire Agreement between the Government of the Republic of the Union of Myanmar and the Ethnic Armed Organisations (Burmese: တစ်နိုင်ငံလုံး ပစ်ခတ်တိုက်ခိုက်မှု ရပ်စဲရေးသဘောတူစာချုပ်), was a landmark ceasefire agreement between the government of Myanmar and representatives of various ethnic insurgent groups, officially known as "ethnic armed organisations" (EAOs) by the government. The draft was agreed upon by a majority of the invited parties on 31 March 2015, and the agreement was signed by President Thein Sein on 15 October 2015. The signing was witnessed by observers and delegates from the United Nations, the United Kingdom, Norway, Japan and the United States. A ceremony is held by the government annually on the anniversary of the signing of the agreement.

The government of Myanmar originally sent invitations to 15 different ethnic insurgent groups, inviting them to participate in long-term peace negotiations. However, seven of those invited declined or dropped out during negotiations due to perceived unfairness.

The Lahu Democratic Union and the New Mon State Party later joined the ceasefire and signed the agreement on 13 February 2018.

Following the 1 February 2021 coup d'état, the Tatmadaw violated the ceasefire agreement by attacking the Restoration Council of Shan State's camps in Shanin Hsipaw Township. Since this violation, the majority of signatories to the agreement have left, including the ABSDF, CNF, KNU, PNLA, and a splinter group of the New Mon State Party known as the NMSP (Anti-Military Dictatorship).

== See also ==
- Ceasefires in Myanmar
- Union Peace Conference – 21st Century Panglong
