= Pa-O National Liberation Army =

Ethnic armed organization in Eastern Myanmar

- ပအိုဝ်ႏစွိုးခွိုꩻလွစ်ထန်ႏရေꩻတပ်မတောႏ
- Military flag of the Pa-O National Liberation Army
- Other name: ကယန်းကျွန်
- Leaders: Khun Ti Saung (2007-2009); Khun Okka (2009-2013); Khun Myint Tun (2013-2018); Khun Thurein (2019- present)
- Military leader: Khun Thurein (2007-2017); Khun Kyaw Htin (2017- present)
- Dates active: Modern: 2009–present Post-independence: 1949–1976
- Headquarters: Mae Hong Son , Mae Hong Son, Shan State, Thailand
- Active regions: Kranni; Myanmar-Thailand border
- Ideology: Pa-O nationalism Federalism
- Size: 100+
- Wars: the Internal conflict in Myanmar

The Pa-O National Liberation Army (Pa'o Karen: ပအိုဝ်ႏစွိုးခွိုꩻလွစ်ထန်ႏရေꩻတပ်မတောႏ, Burmese: ပအိုဝ်းအမျိုးသားလွတ်မြောက်ရေးတပ်မတော်; abbreviated PNLA) is a Pa-O insurgent group in Myanmar (Burma). It is the armed wing of the Pa-O National Liberation Organisation.

The PNLA signed a "Five-Point State-Level Agreement" and an "Eight-Point Union-Level Agreement" with the government of Myanmar on 25 August 2012.

== History ==
From 7–9 December 2009, a Pa-O National Conference was held in the Pa-O Self-Administered Zone, and the Pa-O People's Liberation Organization (PPLO), led by Colonel Khun Okkar, and Shan State Nationalities People's Liberation Organization, led by Brigadier General Khun Ti Soung, merged and established the Pa-O National Liberation Army (PNLA) and its political wing, the Pa-O National Liberation Organisation (PNLO). Group leaders then drafted the PNLO constitution, which became the de facto constitution for the Pa-O SAZ. Attendees of the conference included members of the Pa-O Youth Organization, the Pa-Oh Labor Union and individuals such as U Khun Myint Tun (Thaton MP in the 1990 general election) and Khun Tin Swe (member of the NCUB). Khun Okker was elected as chairman, and Khun Ti Soung as vice-chairman. The founding members chose the name Pa-O National Liberation Army (PNLO) to honour the former PNLO's start and commitment to the "third revolution".

The first PNLO/A congress was held at Laybwer military camp on 16 May 2013, and concluded on 20 May 2013. New central committee members were elected, and Khun Myint Tun was appointed the new chairman. Previous chairmen Khun Okker and Khun Ti Soung have since become patrons.

On 22 January 2024, clashes between the Myanmar military regime and the PNLO/A broke out in Sam Hpu village in Hopong Township.

On 24 January 2024, the PNLA, local PDF forces, and the KNDF attacked the PNO/Junta-controlled town of Hsi Hseng. The Tatmadaw responded with airstrikes and shelling.

On 26 January 2024, the PNLO formally revoked their participation in the Nationwide Ceasefire Agreement and pledged to help the NUG replace the Junta with a federal system. The PNLO implored the Pa-O National Organization to switch sides under the promise that they will not be attacked.

On 10 September, Khun Okka broke away from the PNLO to continue negotiating with the SAC under the NCA.

On 24 August 2026, 78 PNLA members and their families were detained by the Shan State Army-South. They were supposedly part of a group following former commander, Bo Ban Kyu, who surrendered to the PNA a day before. 64 were handed over to the PNA on 31 August. According to the RCSS, the 64 consented to the transfer after negotiations handled by the Karenni Army. The PNLO countered that they were allegedly denied access to the prisoners despite requesting retrieval via the KA. PNLO leaders stated that the RCSS violated a 2017 provision pledged by both groups during the NCA. According to Khun Myint Tun, the PNLA still retains sufficient manpower in spite of a loss of over 100 members.

== Operational areas ==
The PNLA operates primarily in the Pa-O Self-Administered Zone (Pa-O SAZ) in Shan State, consisting of Hopong Township, Hsi Hseng Township, and Pinlaung Township. Until 2024, with the PNLA's declaration of war against the ruling junta of Myanmar, the PNLA de jure administered these townships alongside the 'Pa-O National Army and smaller Pa-O groups. After their revoking of the Nationwide Ceasefire Agreement on 26 January, the PNLA currently has a military presence in Hsi Hseng, around Hopong, and a smaller presence throughout most of the Pa-O SAZ. The PNLA also has a presence in Mawkmai Township and Kyethi Township.

== Ceasefire agreements ==
On 25 August 2012, the government and PNLA agreed on a "Five-Point State-Level Agreement" and an "Eight-Point Union-Level Agreement".

The state level peacemaking groups and the PNLA agreed with the following five points:

1. Both sides are to cease attacks from 25 August 2012 onwards.
2. Both sides are to remain in their own respective designated areas, which are the territories they currently occupy.
3. Both sides are not to distribute arms or materiel to groups outside their designated areas.
4. Unarmed liaison offices are to be established for both sides at Taunggyi, Hsihseng and Maukmai (mutually agreed on by both sides).
5. Official Pa-O representative groups are to be created to hold talks with state level peacemaking groups, and to start further union level peace talks during a period of three months beginning on 25 August 2012.

The Union Peacemaking Work Committee and the PNLA agreed with the following eight points:

1. To further discuss on ceasefires and how to strengthen and further develop them.
2. To coordinate on matters related to code of conduct and discipline amongst officials.
3. To provide assistance by the Union Peacemaking Work Committee for running liaison offices.
4. To continue to provide the locations of PNLO/PNLA troops to the government.
5. To cooperate in the fight against narcotics (illicit drugs).
6. To coordinate on matters related to media.
7. To coordinate on matters related to food, clothing and shelter of soldiers.
8. To coordinate on matters related to public security and basic agriculture.
