= Mongko Region Defence Army =

1995–2000 participant in the Myanmar Civil War

- Leaders: Mong Hsala; Li Nimen
- Dates active: August 1995 – 24 November 2000
- Headquarters: Mongko, Mu Se District, Shan State
- Active regions: Shan State, China–Myanmar border
- Wars: the Internal conflict in Myanmar

The Mongko Region Defence Army (Burmese: မုန်းကိုး ကာကွယ်ရေးတပ်; abbreviated MRDA) was an insurgent group based in Mongko, Shan State, Myanmar. The then-ruling military junta in Myanmar, the State Peace and Development Council (SPDC), allegedly encouraged the MRDA to cooperate with narcos on the China–Myanmar border.

== History ==
In August 1995, Mong Hsala announced his split with Yang Maoliang and the Myanmar National Democratic Alliance Army (MNDAA), and renamed a brigade under his command to the Mongko Region Defence Army (MRDA). Immediately afterwards, the group signed a ceasefire with the government of Myanmar.

In September 2000, deputy commander Li Nimen mutinied and ousted Mong Hsala from the group, with support from Kokang leader Peng Jiasheng, who had ousted Yang Maoliang from the MNDAA several years prior. On November 24, the Tatmadaw had covertly placed shooters in advance at the peace negotiation site at Hay Moe Lone village and shot and killed Li Nimen and his men when they arrived. The remaining members of the MRDA were forcibly disbanded.
