= Restoration Council of Shan State =

Restoration Council of Shan State သျှမ်းပြည်ပြန်လည်ထူထောင်ရေးကောင်စီ
- Abbreviation: RCSS
- Chairman: Yawd Serk
- Secretary-General: Gen. Siri
- Vice Chairman: Sai Yee
- 2nd Vice Chairman: Kherh Ngeun
- Founded: 1996
- Headquarters: Loi Tai Leng, Shan State, Myanmar
- Armed wing: Shan State Army - South
- Membership: 11 CEC members
- Ideology: Shan nationalism Federalism; Monarchism (Note: RCSS clearly shows its loyalty to the Thai monarchy.)
- Seats in the Amyotha Hluttaw: 0 / 224
- Seats in the Pyithu Hluttaw: 0 / 440

Party flag

The Restoration Council of Shan State (Burmese: သျှမ်းပြည်ပြန်လည်ထူထောင်ရေးကောင်စီ; abbreviated RCSS) is a Shan political organisation in Shan State, Myanmar, founded in 1996 by Shan military leader Yawd Serk. Its armed wing, the Shan State Army – South (SSA–S), is a signatory to the Nationwide Ceasefire Agreement with the government of Myanmar. Following the 1 February 2021 coup d'état, the Tatmadaw violated the ceasefire agreement by attacking the camps of the RCSS in Hsipaw Township.

In November 2023, RCSS and their rival Shan ethnic armed organization, the Shan State Progressive Party, declared a ceasefire.

Despite being part of the 7 EAO Alliance did not attend the State Administration Council's 2025 Peace Forum. On 18 August 2025, the RCSS condemned the State Security and Peace Commission junta and its allies for organizing protests against the TNLA and MNDAA in southern Shan State. According to Major Sai Kham San, the junta pressured locals and had them wear traditional Shan clothes to spread ethnic division.
