= KNU/KNLA Peace Council =

Insurgent group in Myanmar

- Leader: Maj. Gen. Saw Htein Maung
- Dates active: 31 January 2007 – present
- Headquarters: To-kawko, Kayin State. Myanmar
- Ideology: Karen nationalism
- Size: <500
- Wars: Karen conflict

The KNU/KNLA Peace Council (KPC) is an armed opposition group in Myanmar (Burma). It was founded on 31 January 2007 by Major General Saw Htein Maung, the then-commander of the 7th Brigade of the Karen National Liberation Army (KNLA). Despite its name, it is neither part of nor affiliated with its former parent organisation, the Karen National Union (KNU), nor the KNLA. The group is a signatory of the Nationwide Ceasefire Agreement, which was finalised in 2015.

In June 2026, Tatmadaw forces raided the Myawaddy Township home of KPC senior officer, Min Htet Paing, after Captain Saw Akar was arrested for using fake currency at a Thai border restaurant. Sizeable quantities of weapons, counterfeit Thai baht, and printing equipment were found. According to local residents, the Tatmadaw interrogated him under charges of arms smuggling, drug trafficking, and counterfeiting.
