= Arakan Liberation Army =

Armed group in Myanmar

- ရခိုင်ပြည် လွတ်မြောက်ရေး တပ်မတော်
- Flag of the Arakan Liberation Army
- Leaders: Khine Ray Khine; Khine Soe Mya (general) X Khaing Moe Lunn †; Khine Min Soe (major general)
- Dates active: 1 June 1971 – present
- Headquarters: Indian Border, Rakhine State
- Active regions: Kayin State; Rakhine State
- Ideology: Rakhine nationalism Federalism
- Size: 60–100
- Part of: Arakan Liberation Party
- Wars: the internal conflict in Myanmar

The Arakan Liberation Army (Burmese: ရခိုင်ပြည် လွတ်မြောက်ရေး တပ်မတော်; abbreviated ALA) is a Rakhine insurgent group in Myanmar (Burma). It is the armed wing of the Arakan Liberation Party (ALP). The ALA signed a ceasefire agreement with the government of Myanmar on 5 April 2012.

== History ==
=== 1968–1969 ===
The Arakan Liberation Army (ALA) was founded on 20 November 1968 with the help of the Karen National Union (KNU), which organised, trained, and supplied the ALA with ammunition and vehicles. On 26 November 1968, Khai Ray Khai, a member of the ALP's central committee, along with nine other associates, were arrested in Sittwe, the capital of Rakhine State, by Burmese authorities. In December 1968, several arrests of the ALP's leaders led to the dissolution of the ALA and the ALP.

=== 1971–1977 ===
Between 1971 and 1972, former political prisoners from the ALP were released on amnesty. As soon as Khaing Moe Lunn, a former ALP political prisoner, was released, he departed to the village of Komura to meet with KNU leaders in order to re-establish the ALA. From 1973 to 1974, the ALA was re-established with help from the KNU, and 300 fighters were recruited and trained, with Lunn as commander-in-chief of the ALA.

Between April and May 1977, 120 ALA fighters led by Lunn engaged with the Indian Armed Forces and the Tatmadaw (Myanmar Armed Forces) at the India-Myanmar border. Ten ALA fighters were killed, including Lunn, over 70 were arrested by Indian and Burmese authorities, and 40 were disarmed and arrested. An additional 20 went missing during retreats from government forces, and 30 of the arrested were executed by shooting. A further 55 others were charged with treason under Article 122 of the then constitution; 11 of them were sentenced to death, and the rest to life imprisonment. The group ceased to exist once again, as it became increasingly risky to operate illegally.

=== 1980–present ===
In 1980, all ALA prisoners were released on amnesty. In 1981, the ALA was once again re-established and assisted by the KNU. The ALA was then led under the new leadership of Khai Ray Khai. Presently, the ALA campaigns on a nationalist agenda, and has been openly hostile towards the Rohingya ethnic minority in Rakhine State, claiming that they are not natives of the region, but illegal immigrants from Bangladesh.

In 2022, the ALA split into two factions led by Khaing Ye Khaing and Saw Mra Razar Lin, with Khaing Soe Naing Aung.

On the morning of 4 January 2023, three ALA leaders, Major Gen. Khine Soe Mya (commander-in-chief), Lieutenant Col. Khine Kyaw Soe and Captain Khine Thuri Na, were driving from the Independence Day celebrations they attended in the city of Sittwe when they were assassinated by unknown assailants. Soon after, the ALA accused the Arakan Army of having perpetrated the assassination.

Sometime in 2023, Saw Mra Razar Lin broke away from Khaing Ye Khaing to negotiate peace talks with Min Aung Hlaing.

The AA accused ALA of aiding and abetting Tatmadaw war crimes in Byian Phyu, Sittwe Township, from 29–31 May 2024.

Residents of Sittwe stated that the ALA collaborates with the Tatmadaw by monitoring conversations and participating in raids where troops pick out alleged supporters of the Arakan Army by checking for tattoos.

On 12 January 2026, members of the ALA deserted their posts in Shwe Min Gan in Sittwe Township, marking the first such noted occurrence of desertion.

On 14 February 2026, Saw Mra Razar Lin denied reports of a gas explosion at her house and subsequent gunfire that killed 4 ALA members. She also denied allegations of ALA forces aiding Tatmadaw forces against Arakan Army attacks.
