= Arakan Army (Kayin State) =

Rakhine insurgent group in Kayin State, Myanmar

- ရခိုင့်တပ်တော်
- Leader: Colonel Min Tun
- Dates active: 2010 – present
- Headquarters: Mobile headquarters
- Active regions: Kayin State; Rakhine State
- Ideology: Rakhine nationalism
- Size: 350+
- Part of: Arakan National Council, United Nationalities Federal Council
- Wars: the internal conflict in Myanmar

The Arakan Army (Kayin State) (Burmese: ရခိုင့်တပ်တော်) (AA-K) is a Rakhine insurgent group based in Kayin State, Myanmar. It is the armed wing of the Arakan National Council.

== Background ==
In 2004, the ANC-AA formed as a merger between the National United Party of Arakan, AASYC (All Arakan Students and Youth Congress), RSU (Rakhine Sangha Union), and ALD (E) [Arakan League of Democracy (Exile)]. It was sometimes called the Arakan State Army.

On 23 June 2020, Thai authorities raided a house in the border town of Mae Sot (close to Kayin State), seizing a large stash of newly manufactured weapons originating from China. Members of a local armed group on the Burmese side of the border told The Irrawaddy that the weapons were likely being smuggled to the Arakan Army and "Indian rebels" because "they pay good prices".

On 7 May, 2021, after the 2021 Myanmar coup, AA-K leader Min Tun announced that the militia had joined anti-Tatmadaw resistance, capturing the Oo Thu Hta military base alongside the Karen National Liberation Army.
