= Karenni National Progressive Party =

Karenni National Progressive Party ကရင်နီအမျိုးသားတိုးတက်ရေးပါတီ
- Abbreviation: KNPP
- Chairman: Khu Oo Reh
- Vice-Chairman: Abel Tweed
- Secretaries: Aung San Myint
- Founded: 1957
- Headquarters: Nya Moe, Shadaw Township, Kayah State
- Armed wing: Karenni Army
- Ideology: Karenni nationalism Federalism
- National affiliation: National Unity Consultative Council
- Seats in the Amyotha Hluttaw: 0 / 224
- Seats in the Pyithu Hluttaw: 0 / 440

Party flag

The Karenni National Progressive Party (Burmese: ကရင်နီအမျိုးသားတိုးတက်ရေးပါတီ; abbr. KNPP) is a Karenni political organisation in Kayah State, Myanmar (Burma). Its armed wing, the Karenni Army, fought against government forces for an independent Karenni State from 1957 until a ceasefire in 2012. A similar ceasefire deal was signed in 1995, but it was dissolved within three months. In 2021, the KNPP became a member of the National Unity Consultative Council.
