= Arakan Liberation Party =

Arakan Liberation Party ရခိုင်ပြည် လွတ်မြောက်ရေး ပါတီ
- President: Khaing Ray Khaing
- Vice President: -
- General Secretary: Khaing Kyaw Khaing
- Joint General Secretary: -
- Founded: 9 April 1967
- Headquarters: Rakhaing - India Border
- Membership: 2,000
- Ideology: Rakhine nationalism Federalism
- Slogan: "Liberty, Equality, Fraternity"
- Seats in the Amyotha Hluttaw: 0 / 224
- Seats in the Pyithu Hluttaw: 0 / 440

Party flag

The Arakan Liberation Party (Burmese: ရခိုင်ပြည် လွတ်မြောက်ရေး ပါတီ; ALP) is a Rakhine political party in Myanmar (Burma). The party has an armed wing, the Arakan Liberation Army (ALA), which has 60-100 personnel. The ALA signed a ceasefire agreement with the government of Myanmar on 5 April 2012 and became a signatory of the Nationwide Ceasefire Agreement (NCA) on 15 October 2015.

== History ==
=== 1967–1969 ===
The Arakan Liberation Party was founded on 9 April 1967, along with its armed wing, the Arakan Liberation Army, with the help of the Karen National Union (KNU). On 26 November 1968, Khai Ray Khai, a member of the party's central committee, along with nine other associates, were arrested at Sittwe, the capital of Rakhine State, by Burmese authorities. On 20 December 1968 Khaing Soe Naing, the party's General Secretary, was arrested by Burmese authorities at Rathedaung Township, in Rakhine State. Following those arrests, several more ALP members were also arrested on different charges, and the party dissolved. The party has accused the government of torturing its imprisoned members.

=== 1971–1977 ===
Between 1971 and 1972, former political prisoners from the ALP were released on amnesty. As soon as Khaing Moe Lunn, a former ALP member, was released, he departed to Komura to meet with KNU leaders in order to re-establish the ALP and ALA. From 1973 to 1974, the ALP was re-established with help from the KNU, and 300 fighters were recruited and trained by the ALA, with Khaing as the President of the ALP and Commander in Chief of the ALA. After a failed offensive by Khaing against both Indian and Burmese forces resulted in massive arrests of party members, the ALP ceased its activities once again.

=== 1980–2015 ===
In 1980, all ALP and ALA prisoners were released on amnesty. In 1981, the ALP and ALA were once again established, now under the leadership of Khai Ray Khai, and was once again assisted by the KNU. The ALP is presently allied with the KNU, along with the National Democratic Front (NDF), the Democratic Alliance of Burma (DAB), and the National Council of the Union of Burma (NCUB).

The ALP signed the Nationwide Ceasefire Agreement (NCA) on 15 October 2015, along with seven other insurgent groups.

=== 2021–present ===
Following the 2021 Myanmar coup d'état, Saw Mya Yarzar Lin reaffirmed her commitment to political dialogue and advocated for the expansion of Arakan Liberation Party liaison offices throughout Rakhine State. Her strategy, centered on continued engagement with the military authorities and adherence to the Nationwide Ceasefire Agreement (NCA), stood in contrast to other ethnic armed organizations that shifted toward armed resistance. This approach became a source of internal friction within the ALP and contributed to a significant rift that ultimately led to a split within the party.

The division gave rise to two competing factions: one that rejected engagement with the junta and aligned itself with the broader anti-coup resistance, and another, led by Saw Mya Yarzar Lin, that maintained a policy of negotiation with the military government under the terms of the existing NCA framework. In January 2022, a faction within the ALP, including chairman Khaing Ye Khaing and then–vice chair Saw Mya Yarzar Lin, expelled vice chair Khaing Soe Naing Aung, accusing him of attempting to form a new political party. Following this reorganization, Khaing Ye Khaing was no longer listed among the party’s leadership.

On 5 March 2023, Saw Mya Yarzar Lin issued a statement announcing the formation of a new leadership structure within the ALP and declared herself as chair, appointing Khaing Ni Aung as vice chair. This move was immediately challenged by the rival faction led by Khaing Ye Khaing and general secretary Khaing Kyaw Khaing, who released a counter-statement on 20 March 2023, rejecting the leadership change as illegitimate and announcing Saw Mya Yarzar Lin's expulsion from the party for violating internal regulations.

The political alignment of Saw Mya Yarzar Lin's faction placed it in direct opposition to the Arakan Army (AA), which has become the dominant force in Arakanese nationalism. Tensions escalated in mid-2024 when the AA accused the Arakan Liberation Army (ALA), the armed wing of the Arakan Liberation Party (ALP), of collaborating with the Tatmadaw in committing war crimes during a village massacre in Sittwe Township.

== See also ==
- Arakan National Party
- Internal conflict in Myanmar
