= Lahu Democratic Union =

Lahu Democratic Union လားဟူဒီမိုကရက်တစ်အစည်းအရုံး
- Abbreviation: LDU
- Ideology: Lahu self-determination
- National affiliation: United Nationalities Federal Council

Alternative Lahu flag

The Lahu Democratic Union (Burmese: လားဟူဒီမိုကရက်တစ်အစည်းအရုံး; abbreviated LDU) is a political and insurgent group of the Lahu people in Myanmar. It was formed in 2008 along the Thailand-Myanmar border. Due to its small size, it was originally barred from signing the Nationwide Ceasefire Agreement (NCA) with the government of Myanmar; it later signed it on 13 February 2018. The LDU is part of the United Nationalities Federal Council (UNFC) and its military coalition, the Federal Union Army (FUA). After the February 2021 coup, the LDU split into two rival factions with Kyar Solomon leading the pro-Junta group. This split reportedly led to the LDU losing popular support in Lahu regions, boosting the popularity of the rival anti-coup Lahu National Development Party.
