= Karenni Army =

Kayah State-based guerilla organization

- ကရင်နီပြည် တပ်မတော်
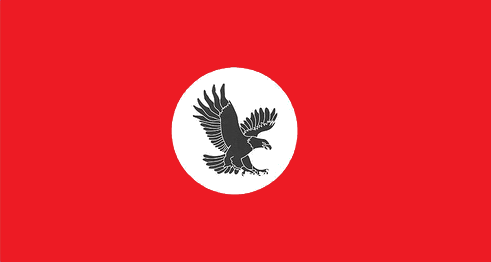
- Flag of the Karenni Army
- Leaders: Khu Oo Reh; Khun Abel Tweed; Khu Plu Reh Aung San Myint; Khu Thaw Reh Est
- Dates active: 1957 – present
- Headquarters: TeLeh Duhso (Nya Moe), Hsotashar Township, Karenni State
- Active regions: Karenni State; Myanmar-Thailand border
- Ideology: Karenni nationalism
- Size: 8,000
- Part of: Karenni National Progressive Party

The Karenni Army (Burmese: ကရင်နီပြည် တပ်မတော်; abbreviated KA) is the armed wing of the Karenni National Progressive Party (KNPP), and operates in eastern Kayah State (also known as Karenni State), Myanmar (Burma).

On 7 March 2012, the government of Myanmar signed a ceasefire agreement with the KNPP, in the presence of international observers from the UN High Commission for Refugees, British Council. and the American embassy. A similar ceasefire deal was signed in 1995, but it was dissolved within three months.

== History ==
The British government recognised and guaranteed the independence of the Karenni States in a treaty with the Burmese King Mindon Min in 1875, by which both parties recognised the area as belonging to neither to the Konbaung dynasty (Kingdom of Burma) nor to the British Empire. Consequently, the Karenni States were never fully incorporated into British Burma. The Karenni States were recognised as tributary to British Burma in 1892, when their rulers agreed to accept a stipend from the British government.

The Constitution of the Union of Burma in 1947 proclaimed that the three Karenni States be united into a single constituent state of the union, called Karenni State. It also gave the possibility of secession from the union after 10 years if the state's leaders were not satisfied with the central government. In August 1948, the Karenni leader U Bee Htu Re was assassinated by a pro-central government militia for his opposition to the inclusion of the Karenni States in the Union of Burma.

Since 1957, the Karenni Army has been fighting government forces in an attempt to create an independent Karenni state, apart from a brief ceasefire in 1995. The KNPP have also fought left-wing groups such as the Kayan New Land Party (KNLP), and the Karenni National People's Liberation Front (KNPLF), both of which were allied with the Tatmadaw (Myanmar Armed Forces). The group has been accused of using child soldiers, a claim that they have not denied, saying that the children had volunteered willingly, because their parents had been killed during fighting between the KA and government soldiers.

Violence between Karenni rebels and the Tatmadaw escalated in May 2021. Beginning on 21 May 2021, the Karenni Army, along with their newly constituted ally the Karenni People's Defense Force, engaged in battles with the Tatmadaw across several towns in Kayah State, leaving dozens dead.

== Flags ==
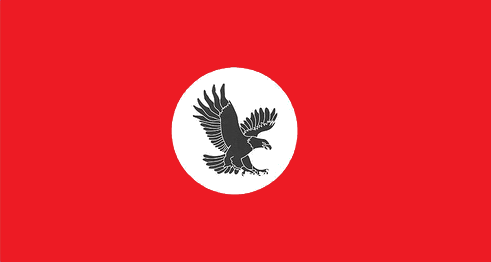
Flag of the Karenni Army

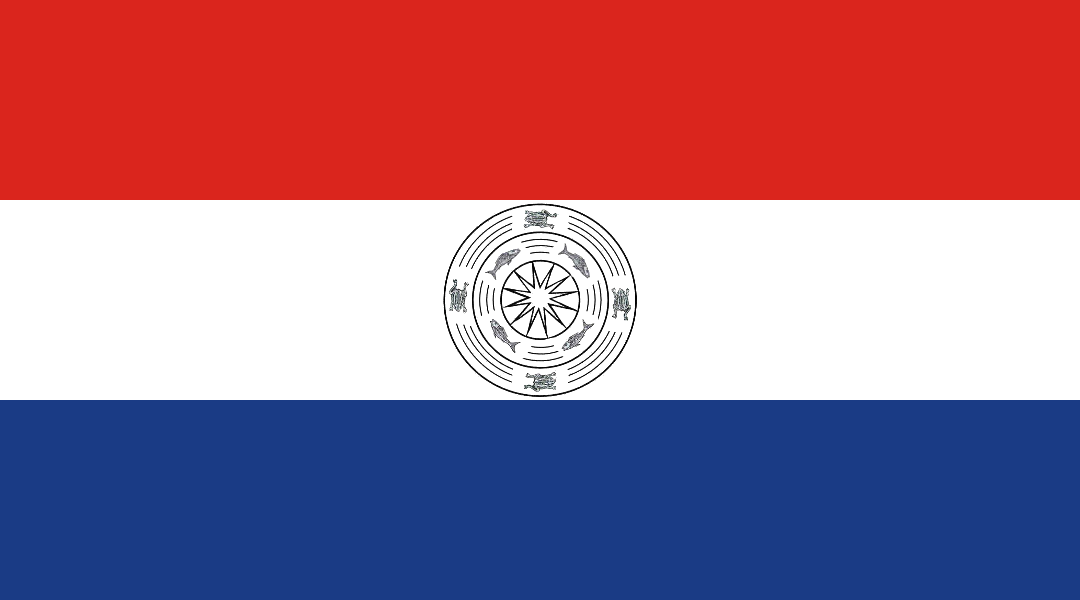
Flag of the Karenni people, used alongside the flag of the Karenni Army

Flag of the Karenni National Progressive Party (KNPP), used alongside the flag of the Karenni Army
