= Shan State Army (SSPP) =

Insurgent group in Myanmar

- ပႃႇတီႇမႂ်ႇသုင်ၸိုင်ႈတႆး – တပ်ႉသိုၵ်းၸိုင်ႈတႆး
- Flag of the Shan State Army (SSPP)
- Dates active: 1971–present
- Group: Shan State Progress Party
- Headquarters: Wan Hai, Kehsi Township, Shan State
- Active regions: Shan State, Myanmar
- Ideology: Shan nationalism Federalism; Socialism; Anti-Chauvinism
- Size: 10,000+
- Wars: the Internal conflict in Myanmar

The Shan State Army (Burmese: ရှမ်းပြည်တပ်မတော် - မြောက်ပိုင်း; abbreviated SSA or SSPP/SSA), also known as Shan State Army – North (SSA-N) (Note: To distinguish it from the Shan State Army (RCSS) (SSA - South)) or Shan State Army/Special Region 3 (SSA/SR-3) is a Shan nationalist insurgent group in Myanmar (Burma). It is the armed wing of the Shan State Progress Party (SSPP).

== History ==
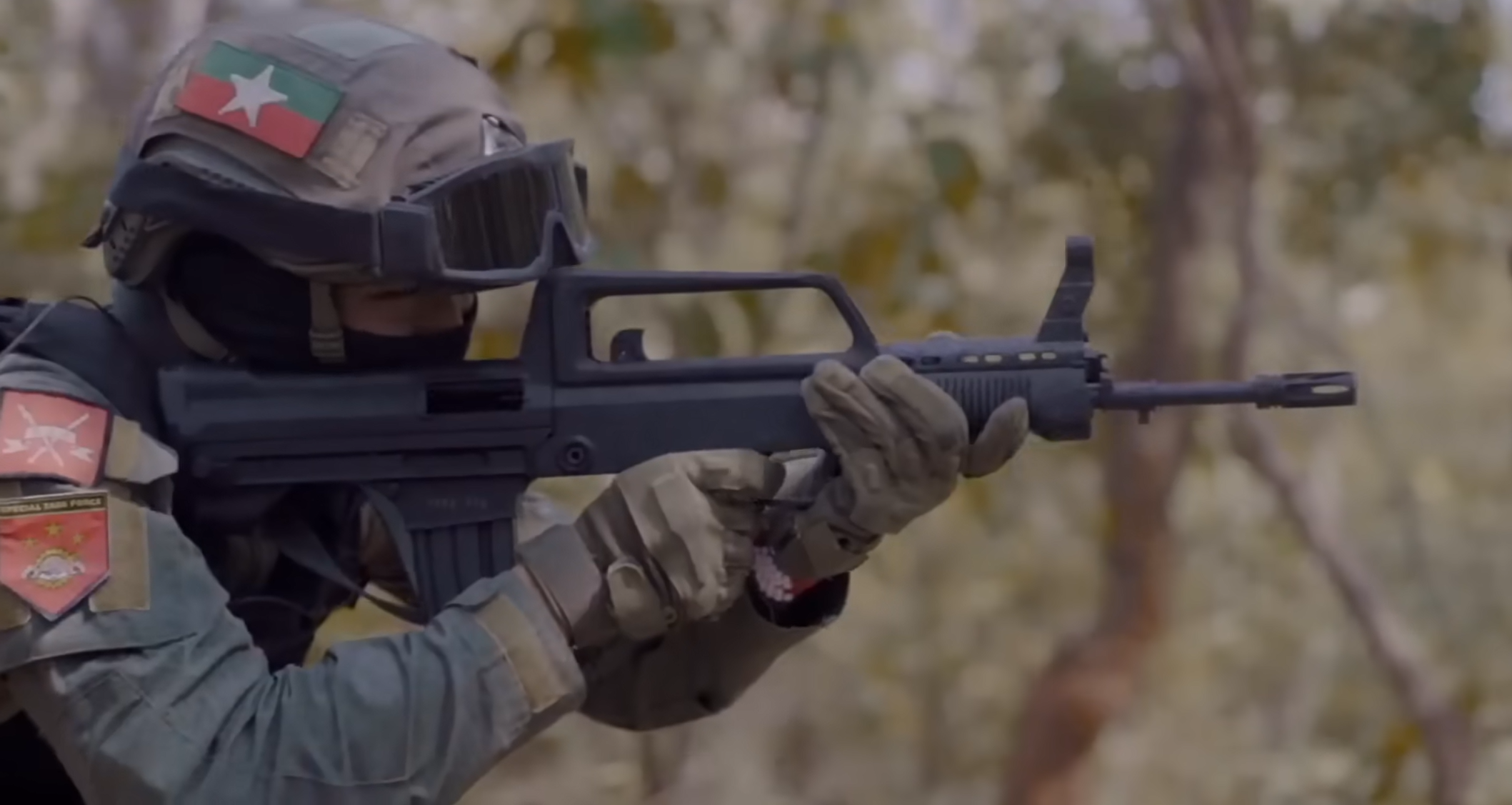
An armed Shan State Army (SSPP) fighter with a QBZ-97.

The Shan State Army was founded on 24 April 1964 and the Shan State Progress Party was founded in 1971 as the political wing of the SSA. In 1989, the SSPP signed a ceasefire in 1989 after negotiations with the State Peace and Development Council and was able to obtain a degree of autonomy for the areas under its control, establishing the Special Region 3 of the Shan State. This area included Nam Kham, Langkho, Hsipaw, Kyauk Mae, Mong Hsu, Tang Yang, Mongyai, Kehsi and Lashio Township. The size of the armed group at that time was of about 4.000 fighters. Even after having signed a ceasefire, the Burmese military continued to attack the Shan State Army (SSPP) areas.

Although the SSPP/SSA is more conciliatory towards the government than other armed Shan separatist groups, in 2005 it abandoned its base rather than disarm. At one point the Burmese government wished the Shan State Army (SSPP) to join its border guard force. Two of the three brigades reportedly agreed to join the border guard, while the other refused.

=== Renewed hostilities ===
In 2014, the group clashed with the Burmese army in Kehsi Mansam Township, home to the SSPP/SSA Wanhai headquarters.

Beginning on 6 October 2015, a large scale offensive by the Tatmadaw comprising 20 Burma Army battalions has been launched in central Shan State. The military aims to seize Shan ceasefire territories in Kehsi, Mong Nawng, Mong Hsu and Tangyan townships, using heavy artillery and with fighter jet and helicopter gunship air support to indiscriminately shell and bomb civilian areas. These attacks have displaced thousands of Shan, Palaung, Lisu and Lahu people causing a new humanitarian crisis.

=== 2021–2026 Myanmar Civil War ===
On 30 November 2023, SSPP/SSA declared a truce with Shan State Army (RCSS), with the SSPP/SSA stating that they intended to unite in the future.

On 3 May, the Vice-Chairperson of the Shan State Progress Party announced that it and its armed forces, the Shan State Army, would join revolutionary forces, and that a political solution to the conflict was "impossible". Later, on 5 May, the vice-chairperson retracted his statement, stating the decision to declare war on the junta was not made.

The SSPP/SSA was criticized for detaining parents and forcefully training them with weapons until at least one of their sons joins their ranks.

According to BBC Burmese, SSA-N impeded Myanmar military forces in Momeik Township during August 2026 fighting. Despite its participation with the Tatmadaw under the Union Government of Myanmar, the Myanmar Army reportedly destroyed homes allegedly used by SSA-N.

== Organisation ==
The SSPP/SSA originally had three brigades: the 1st, 3rd, and 7th brigades, but two brigades, the 3rd and 7th, surrendered in 2009.

== See also ==
- Internal conflict in Burma
- Shan people
