= New Mon State Party =

New Mon State Party Mon: ဗော်ဍုၚ်မည်တၟိ Burmese: မွန်ပြည်သစ်ပါတီ
- Chairman: Nai Hong Sar
- Founded: 20 July 1958
- Headquarters: Ye Chaung Phya (ရေးချောင်းဖျား)
- Armed wing: Mon National Liberation Army
- Ideology: Federalism; Mon interests
- National affiliation: United Nationalities Federal Council
- Colours: Red, yellow, blue, white.

Party flag

Website
- newmonstateparty.org

The New Mon State Party (NMSP) (Mon: ဗော်ဍုၚ်မန်တၟိ; Burmese: မွန်ပြည်သစ်ပါတီ Burmese pronunciation: [mʊ̀m pjì t̪ɪʔ pàtì]) is an opposition party in Myanmar. Its armed wing, the Mon National Liberation Army (MNLA), has fought the government of Myanmar since 1949, but under different names. The NMSP has attempted many times unsuccessfully to push for constitutional and political reforms through the government sponsored National Convention. The NMSP had signed a ceasefire pact with the government in 1995 but the pact turned invalid when the party refused to accept to transform itself into a border guard unit.

The current chair is Nai Hong Sar, who has succeeded his predecessor Nai Htaw Mon) because of health issues.

== History ==
Based on the 1995 ceasefire, there are 12 areas through Mon State, Kayah State, and Tanintharyi Region prohibited for the Burmese military to enter.

Following the SPDC's dissolution in 2011, the NMSP signed state level and union level agreements in 2012.

On 13 February 2018, the NMSP signed the Nationwide Ceasefire Agreement. On 11 May 2023, the NMSP withdrew Peace Process Steering Team, which consists of ethnic armies that signed the Nationwide Ceasefire Agreement.

On 23 May 2022, members of the NMSP held a meeting with the military ruler of Myanmar, Min Aung Hlaing, over the possibility of a separate constitution for Mon State.

Despite previous negotiations, in February 2024, a splinter group of the New Mon State Party and its armed-wing Mon National Liberation Army called the New Mon State Party (Anti-Military Dictatorship) (NMSP-AD), made up of several senior NMSP officials, announced that they will no longer negotiate with the junta and will be joining hands with the revolutionary forces, effectively declaring war on the junta.
