= List of engagements during the Myanmar civil war (2021–present) =

This is a list of engagements that have occurred during the Myanmar Civil War.

Military situation in Myanmar

== Battles ==
Ongoing
Anti-SAC & EAOs victory
Another result like Ceasefires
SAC victory
Inconclusive

Name	Location	Start date	End date	Result of the battle
Battle of Theemuhta	Thee Mu Hta, Hpapun District	27 March 2021	27 March 2021	KNU victory
Kalay clashes	Mainly Kalay and surrounding villages, Myanmar	28 March 2021		Ongoing
Battle of Taze	Taze Township, Shwebo District, Sagaing Region, Myanmar	7 April 2021		Ongoing
Battle of Mindat	Mindat	24 April 2021	13 May 2021	SAC victory
First Battle of Loikaw	Loikaw Township	21 May 2021	12 June 2021	Ceasefire
Muse clashes	Muse Township, Shan state, Myanmar	23 May 2021	2 December 2021	Inconclusive
Pekon clashes	Pekon Township, Taunggyi District, Myanmar	24 May 2021		Ongoing
Battle of Demosho	Demosho Township, Myanmar	24 May 2021	15 June 2021	Ceasefire
Chindwin River ambushes	Chindwin River,Myammar	26 May 2021		Ongoing
Raid on Hnan Khar	Hnan Khar, Gangaw Township, Myanmar	1 June 2021	1 September 2022	SAC victory
2021 Myawaddy clashes	Loikaw Township	2 June 2021	28 December 2021	Inconclusive
2021 Mandalay Boarding House Raid	Mandalay, Myanmar	22 June 2021	22 June 2021	SAC victory
Battle of Myin Thar	Myin Thar, Gangaw Township, Magway Region, Myanmar	9 September 2021	13 September 2021	SAC victory
Battle of Thantlang	Thantlang Township	19 September 2021		Ongoing
Battle of Kachinthay	Kachithay, Shwegu Township, Kachin State, Myanmar	25 November 2021	25 November 2021	Inconclusive
Battle of Lay Kay Kaw	Lay Kay Kaw, Myawaddy District, Myanmar	14 December 2021	31 March 2024	KNU and PDF victory
Battle of Demoso (2022)	Demoso, Demoso Township, Karenni State, Myanmar	1 January 2022	August 2025	SAC victory
Second Battle of Loikaw	Loikaw Township	6 January 2022	8 February 2022	Inconclusive
Khin-U attacks	Khin-U Township, Sagaing Region	29 January 2022		Ongoing
Battle of Kawkareik	Kawkareik Township	21 October 2022	21 October 2022	SAC victory
Siege of Ti Bwar	Chin State	15 November 2022	15 November 2023	Anti-SAC victory
Battle of Mese	Mese Township	19 February 2023	14 June 2023	Anti-SAC victory
Shwe Kokko offensive	Shwe Kokko, Myawaddy District, Myanmar	1 April 2023	11 April 2023	SAC victory
Operation Kanaung	Northern Mandalay Region	15 July 2023	27 September 2023	Anti-SAC victory
Battle of Chinshwehaw	Chinshwehaw; Laukkaing Township; China-Myanmar border	27 October 2023	1 November 2023	MNDAA victory
Operation 1027	Northern Shan State	27 October 2023		Ongoing
Operation Taungthaman	Madaya Township	28 October 2023		Ongoing
Operation 1107	Kayah State	7 November 2023		Ongoing
Third Battle of Loikaw	Kayah State	11 November 2023		Ongoing
Battle of Laukkai	Kokang SAZ	15 November 2023	5 January 2024	MNDAA Victory
Rakhine offensive	Rakhine State	13 November 2023		Ongoing
Battle of Namhsan	Namhsan, Namhsan Township, Pa Laung Self-Administered Zone, Myanmar	10 December 2023	15 December 2023	TNLA victory
Battle of Kyindwe	Chin State	22 December 2023	1 May 2024	Anti-SAC victory
Operation 0307	Kachin State	7 March 2024		Ongoing
Siege of Myawaddy	Myawaddy Township	6 April 2024	24 April 2024	SAC victory
Battle of Maungdaw	Maungdaw Township	21 May 2024	6 December 2024	AA Victory
National Highway 8 offensive	Tanintharyi Region	7 June 2024	October 2024 [?]	Inconclusive
Battle of Lashio	Lashio District	2 July 2024	3 August 2024	MNDAA Victory
Myingyan District Special Operation	Myingyan District	10 August 2024	21 August 2024	Inconclusive
Battle of Budalin	Budalin Township	30 September 2024	30 September 2024	Resistance Victory
Battle of Ann	Ann Township	24 October 2024	20 December 2024	AA Victory
Battle of Falam	Falam, Chin State	9 November 2024	8 April 2025	Resistance Victory
Ngape clashes	Ngape Township	21 November 2024		Ongoing
Battle of Bhamo	Bhamo Township	4 December 2024		Ongoing
Battle of Mepali Camp	Mepali village, Bilin Township	1 January 2025	1 February 2025	Resistance Victory
Battle of Kyaukphyu	Kyaukphyu Township, Myanmar	20 February 2025		Ongoing
Katha Township clashes	Katha Township, Sagaing Region	30 May 2021		Ongoing
Battle of Sittwe	Sittwe Township	13 November 2023		Ongoing

== See also ==
- Timeline of the Myanmar civil war (2021–present)
