= Battle of Demoso =

2021 battle in Myanmar

Battle of Demoso (2021)
- Part of the Karenni theater in the Myanmar civil war
Date	24 May – 15 June 2021 (3 weeks and 1 day)
Location	Demoso, Demoso Township, Karenni State, Myanmar 19.544°N 97.162°E
Result	Ceasefire

Belligerents
Karenni Nationalities Defence Force: Karenni PDF; Karenni National Progressive Party: Karenni Army	Tatmadaw

Units involved
Unknown	427th Infantry Battalion; 102nd Infantry Battalion

Casualties and losses
170+ killed (as of June 6)	11+ killed (as of June 6)
- 70 civilians killed (first battle)

The First Battle of Demoso began on May 21, 2021, between the forces of the State Administration Council junta (known as the Tatmadaw) and Karenni separatist groups allied with the anti-junta People's Defence Force (PDF) during the 2021 Myanmar civil war. The battle took place over the span of a few weeks in the city of Demoso and surrounding villages, eventually ending in a ceasefire between the two parties.

== Prelude ==
Kayah State, also known as Karenni state, is located in eastern Myanmar and is subdivided into townships. The capital of Demoso Township is the city of Demoso, with much of the rest of the township being rural, small villages. The Karen people in the area have been fighting a low-level conflict for independence with the Burmese Army, also known as the Tatmadaw, since 1949. The conflict was paused in 2015 after a peace deal was signed with the government of Aung San Suu Kyi after the 2015 Myanmar general election as Myanmar transitioned to a democracy.

On February 1, 2021, military leadership in the Tatmadaw overthrew the democratic government, and instated a military junta, sparking protests across the country. The first protests in Demoso broke out on February 11, with police arresting seven protesters. In the protests, 30,000 people participated, including much of the Demoso administration. One of the speakers was Demoso town administrator, U Zowani, who opposed the junta along with several other district administrators. By February 14, dozens of police officers from Demoso and Loikaw townships protested in Loikaw against the junta. Afterwards, protests died down in Demoso until May.

On May 21, in Marnaplaw village, a suburb of the city, unknown insurgents attacked a junta patrol, killing two policemen, three junta soldiers, and injuring two more. The insurgents then made their way to Ngwetaung ward, where one more policeman was killed. In response, several of the insurgents were arrested. Clashes also broke out on May 23, with the People's Defence Force, the armed wing of the government-in-exile, capturing a military checkpoint in between Loikaw and Demoso.

== Battle ==
The battle in the city of Demoso began at 4am on May 24, when PDF forces attacked the Demoso police station, which was understaffed at the time. In response, the junta's 427th Infantry Battalion and 102nd Infantry Battalion, both based in Demoso, sent 60-70 soldiers as reinforcements, and began firing artillery from the Ngwetaung Reservoir. Residents of Demoso stated that much of the artillery hit civilian homes in Dawngankha Ward and Tanang U Koi village. In the artillery barrage, two people were killed. Clashes also broke out along the Ngwetaung Reservoir dam between Tatmadaw troops and the Karenni People's Defence Force.

On May 27, two men in the Nguplaw delivering food to refugees were killed by junta troops. That same day, a member of the Free Burma Rangers was killed near Ngwetaung Reservoir. In the battles between May 24–25, two KPDF soldiers were killed, and the number of junta troops killed is unknown. On the night of May 28, clashes broke out again for the first time since the 25th, with PDF forces attempting to recapture the Demoso police station. The fighting occurred between 7-12pm, and died down by the morning of May 29. That same day, junta artillery bombarded Demoso. On May 31, junta troops used helicopters to bombard Karenni Nationalities Defence Force (KNDF) positions, causing an unknown number of casualties. In the clashes, junta troops blew up two bridges connecting Demoso to Hpruso. Protests broke out in the junta-controlled villages of Kaya Pune and Mobye in neighbouring Pekhon Township, Shan State on June 2. That same day, small skirmishes ensued between PDF and the junta after a civilian was injured.

A small skirmish occurred near the Demoso police station on June 5, damaging several houses. The next day, junta troops launched an offensive onto Dawngankha ward, burning down several houses and a church. In the battle, one PDF member was killed, and several others were injured. The KNDF also stated one of their soldiers was killed during the battle. On June 8, Tatmadaw forces launched attacks from Twi Libila mountain on the outskirts of the city, while KNDF and Tatmadaw forces clashed in the village of Sodekhu. Around 400 Tatmadaw reinforcements also arrived towards the border of Karenni and Shan states. By June 9, Tatmadaw forces increased their attacks and incursions onto Dawngankha Ward, while KNDF and PDF controlled most of western Demoso. The Tatmadaw had some control over the eastern part of the city.

A June 4 memo by the Kayah State administration stated that the goal of junta troops was to enter Demoso through the Taungoo-Thantaunggyi road entering the city via the western ward of Dawngankha. The administration also urged civilians in villages and wards around the road to stay safe. Khu Daniel, the leader of the Karenni National Progressive Party (KNPP), released a statement supporting the Demoso PDF. In clashes on June 11, Lieutenant Colonel Chufe of the KNPP's armed wing, Karenni Army, was killed. Later, on June 15, clashes in Ngwetaung ward destroyed many houses, and caused refugees to flee towards the city of Demoso. Residents of Ngwetaung stated that before their houses were torched, Tatmadaw soldiers looted items from the houses. The KNDF and Karenni PDF denied that their troops were present in Ngwetaung at the time of the arson. Whenever residents returned to Ngwetaung days later, several bodies of civilians were discovered, and over 40 houses were torched. On June 15, the KNDF and Demoso PDF began talks for a ceasefire, which mostly succeeded, with the exception of some fringe elements of the Demoso PDF.

== Aftermath ==
Residents of Htipo Klo, a group of villages in Demoso township, told the BBC that Tatmadaw troops stationed there were extorting locals out of money, food, and belongings despite the ceasefire. The military council denied these lootings. Small shootouts occurred near Demoso city as well. On July 12, four bodies of civilians were found in a toilet in a Tatmadaw-occupied village. On August 12, artillery from the 102nd Battalion injured one person in Nyongone village. Short clashes also broke out in Hiphok village on August 13, forcing 2,000 people to flee. Five civilians were killed in the fighting.

The Tatmadaw retook Demoso on 20 August 2025.

== Impact ==
In the first week of fighting, the Tatmadaw blocked all vehicles from entering or exiting Karenni State, causing food shortages. In June 2023, Christian organizations expressed concern for the amount of refugees fleeing from the fighting in Demoso township. By June 6, 2021, aid groups in Karenni State stated over 100,000 refugees were fleeing the fighting. A resident of Dawngankha ward stated that many civilians from the area fled to PDF-controlled areas of Demoso, so the Tatmadaw employed scorched earth tactics to prevent refugees fleeing to houses recaptured by the PDF.

== See also ==
Battle of Demoso (2022)
