= Mo So =

Village in Kayah State, Myanmar

Mo So မိုဆို
- Village
- Location in Myanmar (Burma)
- Coordinates: 19°25′01″N 97°05′44″E
- Country: Myanmar
- Division: Kayah State
- District: Loikaw District
- Township: Hpruso Township
- Time zone: UTC+6.30 (MMT)

Mo So (Burmese: မိုဆို) is a village in the Hpruso Township of Kayah State, Myanmar. Mo so is the primary village in the Mo So village tract and is located west of Hpruso on the Hpruso-Mo So-Hoyar Road.

On 24 December 2021, Myanmar Army carried out an alleged massacre against civilians near the village.
