= Mo So massacre =

2021 massacre in Myanmar

Coordinates: 19°25′29.56″N 97°06′02.93″E

- Part of the Myanmar civil war
- Site of massacre (Myanmar)
- Location: Mo So, Hpruso Township, Kayah State
- Date: 24 December 2021
- Deaths: 44: 40 civilians; 4 military troops; 13 missing
- Perpetrators: Myanmar Army including Aung Zaw Aye and Ni Lin Aung

The Mo So Massacre, also known as the Christmas Eve Massacre, was a mass killing of civilians that occurred on the afternoon of 24 December 2021, in Hpruso Township in Kayah State, Myanmar. During the massacre, Myanmar Army troops killed and burned over forty people.

The following day, the Karenni Nationalities Defence Force (KNDF) found the victims burned in their vehicles. The incident was condemned by the United Nations, Save the Children, and the United States Embassy in Myanmar.

== Incident ==
More than a hundred soldiers from the Myanmar Army's Light Infantry Division 66 traveled from Demoso to Hpruso, where they engaged individuals driving on the Moso-Koi Ngan Road. Four members of the Karenni National People's Liberation Front (KNPLF), an ethnic armed organisation then under Border Guard Forces, arrived on the scene and attempted to negotiate for the release of the detainees. The soldiers shot and killed those from KNPLF, who were first beaten with their hands tied behind their backs. The Myanmar Army troops then ransacked the victims and their belongings.

Next, members of the Myanmar Army tortured and arrested local villagers and stole their private property. The commander of the KNDF Brigade 4 spotted vehicle fires by 11:00 on 24 December but did not see the burning bodies at the time because of the intensity of the fire.

Upon securing the scene on 25 December, the KNDF found the victims' bodies burned to ashes or charred beyond recognition, both in their vehicles and on the ground beside them. More than twelve vehicles were burned, including three large petroleum trucks, three cars, two tractors, and five motorcycles. The vehicles were also looted for food, medication, and gasoline. The KNDF reported finding the victims' clothing scattered about the scene. It took two days to collect the remains because the soldiers continuously shelled the area.

On 27 December, the KNDF reported that over thirteen individuals were missing after the incident, including eight people from Loikaw who worked in a petrol station and three others believed to be on the roadway where the massacre occurred. Two staff from the humanitarian organization Save the Children were missing after being caught in the incident. Their vehicles were found burned, and the workers were later confirmed dead. Khue Li Reh, a forest ranger, was also believed by police to be another victim because his burned motorcycle was found at the scene. Other victims were the drivers of trucks for a local petrol company.

Ten days after the massacre, the Karenni State Police held a press conference, announcing that there were 31 bodies, five female and 26 male, as well as three large refuse bags of human remains turned to ash. Although autopsies were conducted, it was almost impossible to identify the victims. The postmortems revealed that one victim was a girl around the age of ten. Some victims were gagged with their hands tied behind their backs at the time of their death.

The KNDF identified the Myanmar military junta as the principal culprit of the looting and killings. According to Myanmar's state government, their soldiers killed an unknown number of people in seven vehicles from Koi Ngan that failed to stop at a security checkpoint. The soldiers referred to the victims as "terrorists with weapons" who shot at the soldiers before they were "captured dead". The soldiers stated that the vehicles contained "recruits for terrorist training" and caught on fire during the shooting.

Later, the military junta’s Brig-General Zaw Min Tun said that a group of some twenty gunmen attacked his troops. He noted that 25 bodies were found and that the vehicles caught on fire during the shooting.

However, the KNDF noted that most of the victims were local villagers who did not have firearms, including four children. In addition, the police noted that most victims were shot in the head, none were found in the driver's seat of the vehicles, and none of the vehicles were moving when they caught on fire. One doctor who examined the victims' bodies noted, “They killed innocent civilians and burned the bodies to destroy the evidence of their crime."

== Reactions ==
=== Within Myanmar ===
Fifty-nine civil organizations across Myanmar condemned the massacre, promising "they will stand with Karenni People to get justice". The Myanmar government, meanwhile, refused to comment on the incident. Save the Children temporarily suspended operations parts of Myanmar after the attack. The National Unity Government of Myanmar condemned the incident, tweeting that the international community must "act immediately & decisively to end the military junta’s escalating war crimes & crimes against humanity."

=== International ===
The United Nations Undersecretary-General for Humanitarian Affairs, Martin Griffiths, said it was a "horrific" incident and that the Government of Myanmar must investigate the massacre. The American embassy in Myanmar also condemned the massacre, deeming it "barbaric" and demanding that the government "immediately cease its indiscriminate attacks in Karen State and throughout the country and ensure the safety of all civilians in line with international law.”

In the aftermath of the massacre, the European Union called for international arms embargo on Myanmar’s military regime.

In February 2022, the European Union sanctioned two Burmese generals - Ni Lin Aung, the commander of the Eastern Command and Aung Zaw Aye, commander of the Bureau of Special Operations No. 2 - for their leadership role in the massacre. The Eastern Command's Light Infantry Battalions (LID) 531 and 66, which are under the direct purview of Ni Lin Aung and Aung Zaw Aye, were implicated in the massacre. In August 2022, Human Rights Watch reported that Tin Soe, a brigadier general who had been based in the Eastern Command during the massacre, had been trained by the Japan Self-Defense Forces. In September 2022, the Japanese government announced it was suspending training programs for the Burmese military.

The killing of four KNPLF soldiers angered members of the organization. Units from the organisation defected on 13 June 2023.

== See also ==
- Save the Children Jalalabad attack, a massacre that also targeted Save the Children
- Hlaingthaya massacre, the first major massacre following the February 2021 coup
- List of massacres in Myanmar
