= Battle of Lay Kay Kaw =

Battle in the Myanmar civil war

Coordinates: 16°36′N 98°32′E

- Part of the Myanmar civil war (2021–present) and the Myanmar conflict
Date	14 December 2021 – 31 March 2024 (2 years, 3 months, 2 weeks and 3 days)
Location	Lay Kay Kaw, Myawaddy District, Myanmar
Result	KNU and PDF victory

Belligerents
Karen National Union; People's Defense Force	State Administration Council

Strength
Unknown	Unknown

Casualties and losses
At least 4 killed	At least 5 killed
- At least 30 people arrested; at least 1500 displaced in Thailand

The Battle of Lay Kay Kaw was an engagement between allied Karen National Union(KNU)/ People's Defense Force (PDF) fighters and the Myanmar Tatmadaw that began on 14 December 2021.

== Background ==
Shortly after negotiations between the KNU and the Tatmadaw, Lay Kay Kaw was built in 2015 as a cooperation between the then-chief minister of Kayin State, Zaw Min, and KNU's chairperson, Saw Mutu Say Poe, with the support of Nippon Foundation, Divided into six quarters, it has a population of more than 3000. Despite administration of the Kayin State Government, the town has been controlled de facto by the KNU for six years.

Since the February 2021 coup, anti-coup protesters and those who joined the civil disobedience movement came to Lay Kay Kaw to evade the military and receive guerrilla training.

== Battle ==
On 14 December 2021, the Tatmadaw raided Lay Kay Kaw, arresting dozens of former NLD members and other anti-regime activists.

Days after the raid, the Karen National Liberation Army (KNLA) and PDF forces clashed with Myanmar Army troops, who resorted to airstrikes and heavy artillery. Due to these strikes, at least 2500 local villagers fled to Mae Sot, border town in Thailand. After a shell landed in a sugarcane plantation, and a small fire broke out, Thai authorities, through Thai–Myanmar Border Committee, issued a warning that "it was prepared to retaliate if stray artillery shells landed on Thai soil", and Thai armed forces were deployed in the border area. On 20 December 2021, KNU urged the UN and international community to establish the area as a no-fly zone.

Sometime during late 2022, the Myanmar junta captured the town. However, by 31 March 2024, anti-junta forces retook Lay Kay Kaw.
