= Battle of Sittwe =

2023 battle in Myanmar

Coordinates: 20°9′N 92°54′E

- Part of Operation 1027 (Rakhine Theatre) in the Myanmar civil war
Date	13 November 2023 – ongoing (2 years, 3 months, 2 weeks and 4 days)
Location	Sittwe, Myanmar

Belligerents
Myanmar; State Administration Council (until 2025); Muslim militias; Arakan Liberation Army	Arakan Army

Commanders and leaders
Major General Kyaw Swar Oo; Lieutenant General Naing Naing Oo	Twan Mrat Naing; Nyo Twan Awng; Major General Htet Myint Thein †

Units involved
Tatmadaw: Myanmar Army; Myanmar Air Force; Myanmar Navy; Myanmar Police Force	Arakan Army

Strength
2,000 infantry 1,000 naval troops 10 warships	unknown

Casualties and losses
Tatmadaw: 240+ killed 30+ captured Multiple injured	unknown
- At least dozens of civilians killed and injured Over 1,000 residents fled.

In late 2023, the Arakan Army began attacking Sittwe as part of its Operation 1027. As of 2026, Sittwe is the only settlement in northern Rakhine state which is still under junta control.

== Background ==
Sittwe is the capital of Rakhine State and serves as a key city for the SAC. The city plays a vital role in Myanmar's oil and gas trade through the Indian Ocean. Sittwe hosts around 10 junta battalions, including a Regional Operations Command, along with artillery, infantry, and light infantry units, as well as a naval base.

== Timeline ==
In March 2023, Myanmar's military imposed curfews in Sittwe amid rising conflict and battles.

On 4 March 2024, the AA announced that it had seized control of Ponnagyun Township.

In mid-2024, the military regime forced residents from around 20 villages in Sittwe to use them as “human shields” around its bases.

On 29 August 2024, fighting between the Arakan Army and junta forces erupted largely in the township. The junta used heavy shelling around the region and nearby townships as the AA continued retaliation.

In February 2025, AA launched an artillery assault on the regime outposts in Padaleik and Amyintkyun villages, including a naval base near Shwemingan Port in Sittwe Township which hosts the military's Light Infantry Battalions 232 and 344.

On early 2026, AA captured two military outposts in Sittwe's Regional Operations Command on Kan Kaw Kyun. Military junta forces in Yay Chan Pyin Village were forced to retreat up to the State Parliament office. On 11 January, the AA announced that their battalion commander Major Htet Myint Thein was killed in action on the frontline of the battle.

Between 1–13 January 2026, multiple junta soldiers in Sittwe Township, including from Ohn Taw Gyi camp, the 270th Battalion, and Police Battalion 36, deserted their posts by abandoning their weapons and fleeing by sea, multiple troops were captured by the AA.

By early March 2026, clashes have been erupting in the military council's Shwe Min Gan Naval Base and some military camps near Zaw Madek. On 24 March, the naval base at Shwe Min Gan was attacked from across the river launching assaults from villages, resulting in the deaths of approximately 30 or 40 soldiers. The Kyar Ma Thauk village in the north of Sittwe is also attacked with warships responding from shelling.

As of mid-June 2026, clashes has erupted to Naryikan village, which is around a mile from Sittwe town and its regional operational command.

On 4 September, the junta launched an offensive dubbed "Operation 4926," of which one portion involved an offensive out of Sittwe. This included an increase of airstrikes in Pyauktaw Township. The Arakan Army claimed that around 200 junta troops were killed between 4 September and 11 September near Khamaungtaw and Ywarbo, around 20 kilometers north of Sittwe.

Mid-October saw an increased fighting over Nga Pyi Kyun island, located in the confluence east of Sittwe. On 26 October 2026, the Arakan Army sunk two Tatmadaw warships. This coincided with the end of Wa Kyut, or Buddhist Lent, on the night of Thadingyut, under a full moon.

== See also ==
- List of engagements during the Myanmar civil war (2021–present)
  - Battle of Maungdaw
  - Battle of Kyaukphyu
  - Battle of Ann
