= Battle of Kawkareik =

2022 battle in Myanmar

- Part of Myanmar civil war (2021–present)
Date	21 October 2022
Location	Kawkareik, Kayin State, Myanmar 16.57057°N 98.28390°E
Result	SAC victory

Belligerents
State Administration Council; Tatmadaw; Myanmar Army; 97th Battalion	Karen National Liberation Army; Kawthoolei Army People's Defence Force

Commanders and leaders
	L Say Warr (KTLA) Bo Kyaw Thet †

Casualties and losses
9 dead	1 dead, 3 injured
- 3 dead, 16+ injured

The Battle of Kawkareik or siege of Kawkareik occurred in late October 2022 when the Karen National Liberation Army (KNLA) escalated fighting in southeastern Myanmar and besieged the district-level capital town of Kawkareik. At the time, it appeared to be a significant first seizure of a major town by anti-junta forces since the renewed civil war.

Fighting broke out on 21 October with a series of surprise attacks on the Asia Highway leading into Kawkareik and at government offices within the town. Ultimately, the resistance forces were unable to take the urban areas due to the junta's air and artillery strikes. Heavy artillery shelling and air strikes from the junta targeted the military garrison base in Ward 2, while the rebel forces engaged in a battle near the General Administration Department office in Ward 7. According to the KNLA, their objective was to draw junta reinforcements away from surrounding positions and was never to take the town.

== Background ==
In 2021, the State Administration Council junta seized power in the 2021 Myanmar coup d'état, sparking a civil war between the ousted National Unity Government (NUG) and renewing the long-standing Karen conflict. The Karen National Liberation Army (KNLA), the armed wing of the Karen National Union (KNU), launched attacks in Myawaddy District and in Lay Kay Kaw as early as April 2021.

In August 2022, the KNLA led attacks on the Kawkareik District police station and the General Administration Department office in Kawkareik.

== Battle ==
The siege of Kawkareik began after a call to action from the NUG in mid October. The NUG's local People's Defence Forces (PDFs) worked with Karen rebel forces in the battle.

The battle itself was instigated by Boh (Lieutenant) L Say Warr, who serves the Kaw Thoo Lei Army (KTLA), a group established in July 2022. He previously served in the Karen National Defence Organisation (KNDO), the KNU's first armed wing.

Around 7 a.m. on 21 October 2022, Kaw Thoo Lei Army (KTLA) forces launched a surprise attack in Kawkareik Township, targeting police offices, toll gates and administrative offices of the junta. The junta's Light Infantry Battalion 97 responded with mortar shells, killing one and injuring two civilians. Eyewitnesses reported Myanmar Air Force aircraft flying over and bombing the Asian Highway-1 to the town's east. Fighting broke out in various parts of the town involving PDF and KNLA forces. The junta responded with heavy artillery shelling and air strikes, killing three civilians and injuring at least 15. According to the rebels, the town was surrounded and being patrolled by the joint rebel coalition by that afternoon.

Heavy artillery shelling and air strikes from the junta targeted the military garrison base in Ward 2 while the rebel forces engaged in a battle near the General Administration Department office in Ward 7, 0.7 miles (1.1 km) to the north. The junta continued its shelling of the town, targeting Ward 7 of Kawkareik- destroying civilian homes in the process. Regime troops stationed in nearby Kamaigone, Kawnwet and Ywarthit villages were withdraw to defend Kawkareik.

At the end of the day, the rebel forces withdrew eastwards. Like in the July 2022 Battle of Loikaw, the junta's air strikes and multiple rocket launcher systems prevented the well-armed resistance forces from taking urban areas. However, according to Lt. Col. Saw Yan Naing of the KNLA Brigade 6, the objective of the attack was to force the junta to withdraw from positions in villages south of Kawkareik, not to take the city. The state-run MRTV reported that the army had driven the rebels, who the news station called terrorists, after the rebels fired artillery shells into Kawkareik to destroy government personnel housing.

=== Continued skirmishes ===
Fighting continued east of the town near the Tamaw Waterfall. On 25 November, the rebel forces clashed with the junta forces on the Asian Highway east of Kawkareik, with two vehicles being set on fire as a result of the shootout. The Asian Highway remained closed because of the fighting until 26 November 2023. The KTLA warned travelers to ask them for permission first as a precaution citing that fighting was still occurring on the highway.

On 28 October, airstrikes from the junta as part of continued fighting near Kawkareik struck and damaged a dam.
