= To-kawko =

- Village
- Location in Myanmar (Burma)
- Coordinates: 16°46′0″N 98°10′6″E
- Country: Myanmar
- Division: Kayin State
- District: Kawkareik District
- Township: Kawkareik Township
- Time zone: UTC+06:30 (MMT)

To-kawko, also spelled Tokawko, is a village in Kawkareik Township, in Kayin State, Myanmar (Burma). The headquarters of the KNU/KNLA Peace Council are located in the village.
