= Saw B San Thein Myint =

Burmese politician

Member of the Amyotha Hluttaw
- Incumbent
- Assumed office 1 February 2016
- Constituency: Kayin State No. 8
- Majority: 13624 votes

Personal details
- Born: 30 June 1963 (age 62) Kawkareik Township, Kayin State, Myanmar
- Party: National League for Democracy
- Spouse: Nan Hla Shin
- Children: 2
- Parent(s): Thaung Kyi (father); Mal Myaing (mother)
- Occupation: Politician

Saw B San thein Myint (Burmese: စောဘီစံသိန်းမြင့်, born 30 June 1963) is a Burmese politician who currently serves as an Amyotha Hluttaw MP for Kayin State No. 8 Constituency. He is a member of the National League for Democracy.

== Early life and education ==
Saw was born on 30 June 1963 in Kawkareik Township, Kayin State, Myanmar. He is an ethnic Karen. His previous job was as a farmer. He had served as the executive member of NLD township.

== Political career ==
He is a member of the National League for Democracy. In the 2015 Myanmar general election, he was elected as an Amyotha Hluttaw MP, winning a majority of 13624 votes and elected representative from Kayin State No. 8 parliamentary constituency. He also serves as the member of Amyotha Hluttaw's Ethnic Affairs Committee.
