= Shay Rei Shu Maung =

Burmese politician

Member of the Amyotha Hluttaw
- Incumbent
- Assumed office 1 February 2016
- Constituency: Kayah State No.2
- Majority: 14087 votes

Personal details
- Born: 27 August 1952 (age 73) Demoso, Kayah State, Burma (Myanmar)
- Party: National League for Democracy
- Parent(s): Uh Ray (father); Ko Myhar (mother)
- Occupation: Politician

Shay Rei Shu Maung (Burmese: ရှေးရယ်ရှုမောင်, born 27 August 1952) is a Burmese politician who currently serves as a House of Nationalities member of parliament for Kayah State № 2 constituency.

== Early life and education ==
He was born on 27 August 1952 in Demoso, Kayah State, Burma (Myanmar).

== Political career ==
He is a member of the National League for Democracy. In the Myanmar general election, 2015, he was elected as an Amyotha Hluttaw MP, winning a majority of 14087 votes and elected representative from Kayah State № 2 parliamentary constituency .

He also serves as a member of Amyotha Hluttaw Local and International Non-Government Organizations Committee.
