= Demoso District =

Demoso District ဒီးမော့ဆို ခရိုင်
- District
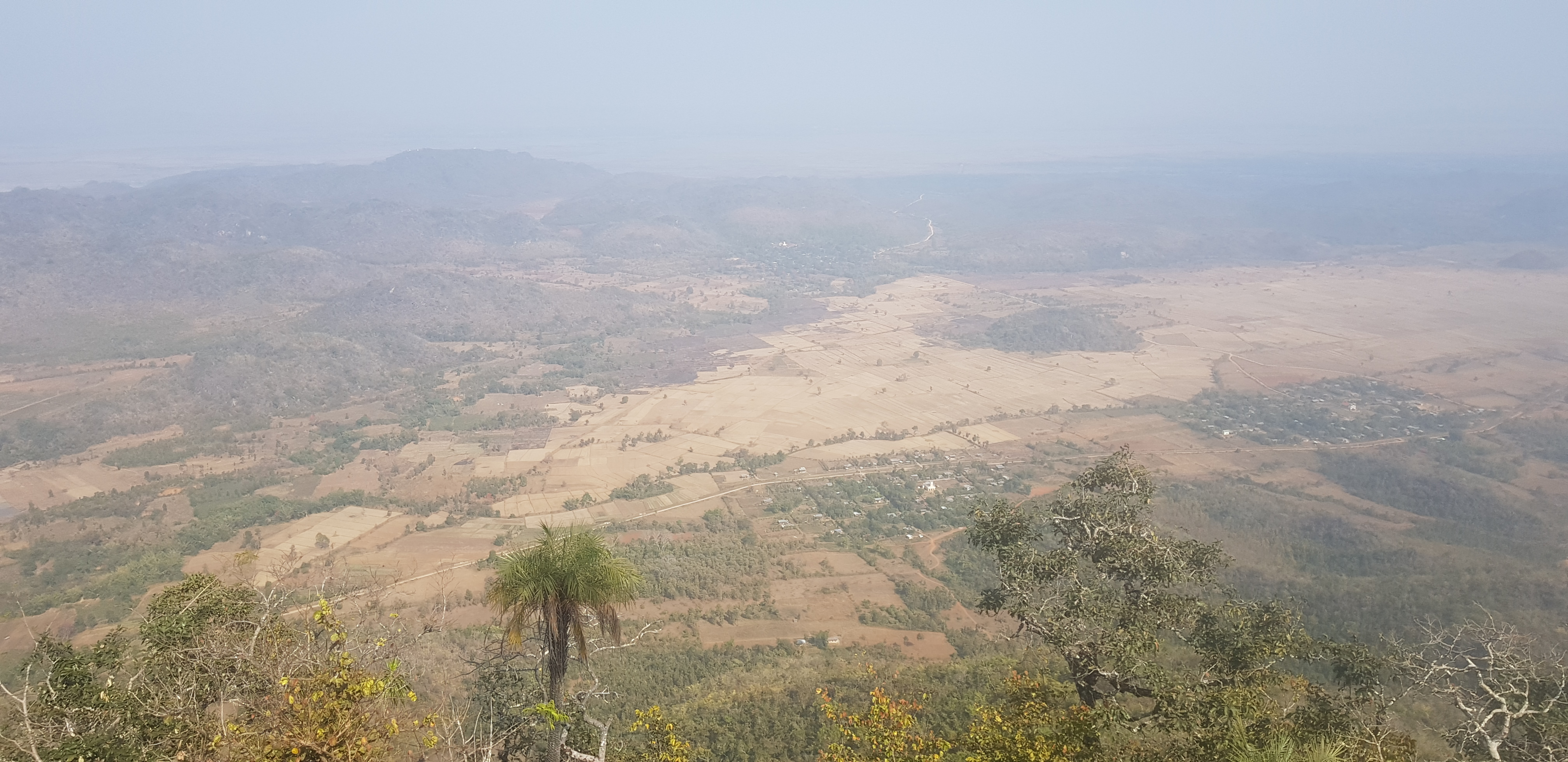
- View from Loinanpha Hill

- location in Kayah State

- Location in Burma
- Coordinates: 19°32′0″N 97°03′0″E
- Country: Myanmar
- State: Kayah
- Time zone: UTC6:30 (MST)

Demoso District (Burmese: ဒီးမော့ဆို ခရိုင်) is the district of Kayah State, Myanmar. Its principal town is Demoso.

== Townships ==
Townships of Demoso District Demoso Township Hpruso Township

The townships, cities, towns that are included in Demoso District are as follows:

- Demoso Township
  - Demoso
  - Nanmekon
- Hpruso Township
  - Hpruso

== History ==
On April 30, 2022, new districts were expanded and organized. Demoso Township and Hpruso Township from Loikaw District are formed as Demoso District.
