= Lawpita =

Town in Loikaw Township, Myanmar

Lawpita လောပိတမြို့
- Town
- Law Pi Ta
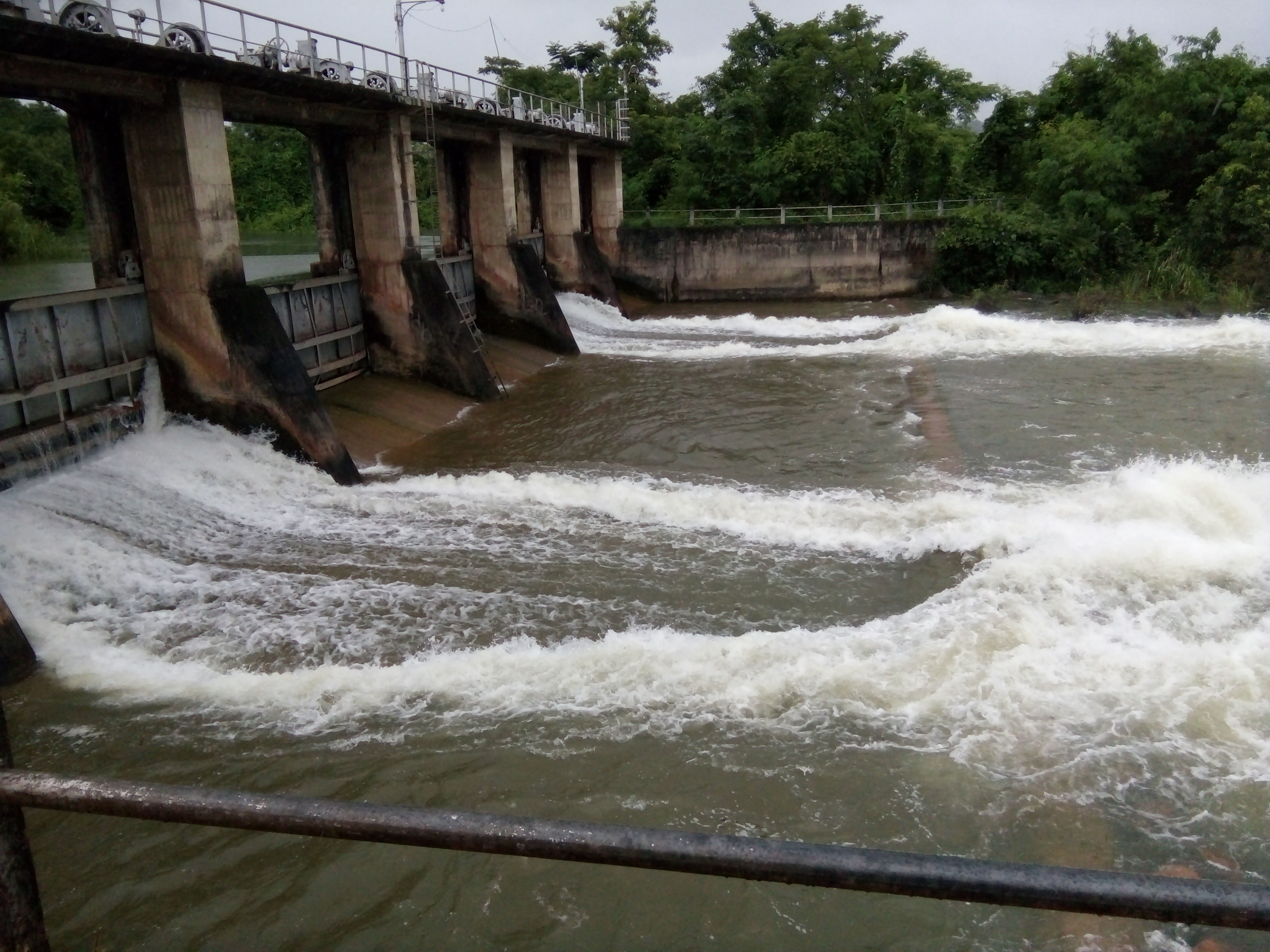
- Lawpita Hydroelectric Power Station
- Interactive map of Lawpita
- Coordinates: 19.55°N 97.33°E
- Country: Myanmar
- State: Kayah State
- District: Loikaw District
- Township: Loikaw Township

Area
  - Total: 0.762 sq mi (1.97 km^{2})
- Elevation: 2,654 ft (809 m)

Population (2026)
  - Total: 3,729
  - Density: 4,890/sq mi (1,890/km^{2})
- Time zone: UTC+6.30 (MMT)

Lawpita (Burmese: လောပိတမြို့) is a town in Loikaw Township, Kayah State, Myanmar near the Kayah-Shan State border. In 2026, the town had 3,729 people and decreased in population form 2025 when it had 3,950 people. The town is primarily Buddhist with 96.6% of the town adhering to the religion. The town is ethnically 45.6% Bamar, 29.4% Karenni and 20.3% Shan.

Lawpita is most famous for its proximity to one of Myanmar's main sources of hydroelectric energy. As part of the larger Lawpita hydropower project, the Lawpita Hydropower Plant I and Lawpita Hydropower Plant II were built in the 1950s with funds from Japanese World War II reparations and with the help of Japanese corporations Kajima and Nippon Koei. Lawpita I was complted in 1974 and Lawpita II in 1992. The nearby Lawpita Falls was damaged when the Lawpita II Plant was completed. These dams are also called Baluchaung I and Baluchaung II to differentiate from the main dam of the hydroelectric project in Mobye, Shan State. Additional funds were given to rehabilitate the plant in the 2000s.

In 2026, during the current civil war, the junta set up checkpoints and inspected trucks as part of enforcing a ban on fuel sales in Lawpita.

== Wards ==
As of 2026, the town is subdivided into 8 wards:

- Daw Se
- Kanni
- Kyauk Tuang
- Law Ka Htu Kwet Thit
- Law Ka Htu
- Lawpita (Shan)
- Lawpita
- Shan Kwet Thit

== Notable People ==
- L Phaung Sho - 2nd Chief Minister of Kayah State (2016-2020)
