= Myawaddy (disambiguation) =

Myawaddy is a town in Kayin State, Myanmar.

Myawaddy may also refer to:

- Myawaddy District
  - Myawaddy Township
- Myawaddy TV, Burmese TV network

== See also ==
- Myawady F.C., Burmese professional football club based in Naypyidaw
