= Loilinlay =

Town in Loikaw Township, Myanmar

Loilinlay လွိုင်လင်လေးမြို့
- Town
- Loilen Lay
- Htee Zai Kha Waterfall, in the northern suburb of Loilinlay
- Interactive map of Loilinlay
- Coordinates: 19.87°N 97.23°E
- Country: Myanmar
- State: Kayah State
- District: Loikaw District
- Township: Loikaw Township

Area
  - Total: 0.451 sq mi (1.17 km^{2})
- Elevation: 2,707 ft (825 m)

Population (2026)
  - Total: 3,403
  - Density: 7,550/sq mi (2,910/km^{2})
- Time zone: UTC+6.30 (MMT)

Loilinlay (Burmese: လွိုင်လင်လေးမြို့), also known as Loilen Lay, is a town in Loikaw Township, Kayah State, Myanmar close to the Kayah-Shan State border. In 2026, the town had 3,404 people and decreased in population form 2025 when it had 3,950 people. The town is primarily Buddhist with 80.0% of the town adhering to the religion with Christianity second with 19.9% of the population. The town is ethnically 56.0% Bamar, 24.9% Karenni and 15.3% Shan.

As of 2026, the town is subdivided into 3 wards: Aung Mingala, Aung Tayza and Aung Theik Di wards.

The town was elevated from village status on 26 October 2017, through Legal Notication No. 1387/2017.

The town was hit by artillery shells from the Tatmadaw during the current civil war in July 2023, injuring five residents. In 2025, The Myanmar Army Light Infantry Battalion 530 based itself in the town to launch attacks on the surrounding resistance-held territory, injuring civilians.
