= Loikaw Township =

Loikaw Township ꤞꤤꤚꤤꤘꤢꤪ꤭ ꤠꤟꤤ꤭ꤗꤟꤌꤣ꤭ လွိုင်ကော်‌မြို့နယ်
- Township
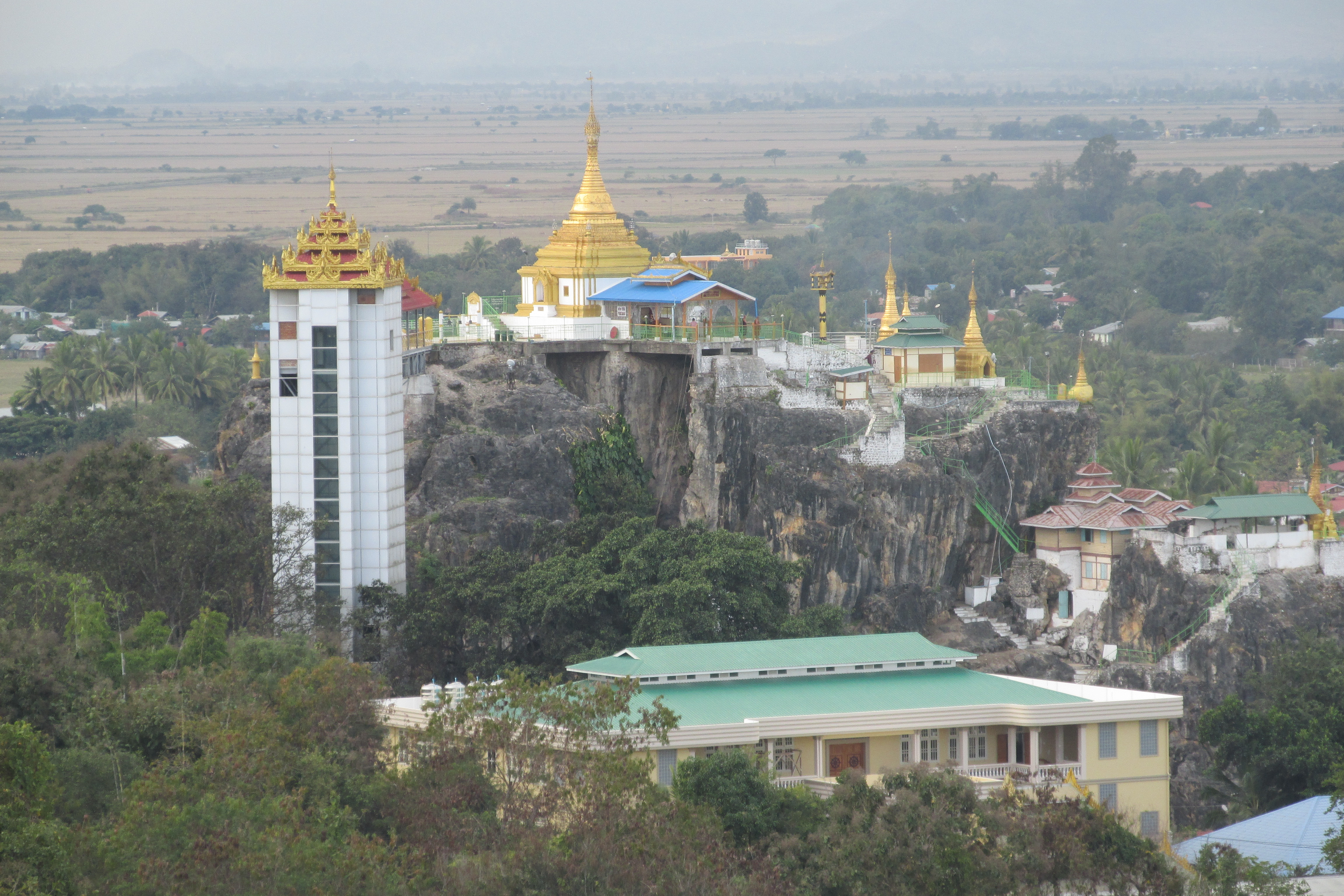
- Taungkwe Pagoda

- Location in Loikaw district
- Coordinates: 19°44′43″N 97°18′58″E
- Country: Myanmar
- State: Kayah State
- District: Loikaw District
- Capital: Loikaw

Area
  - Total: 598.06 sq mi (1,549.0 km^{2})
- Elevation: 2,950 ft (900 m)

Population (2026)
  - Total: 128,401
  - Density: 214.70/sq mi (82.895/km^{2})
  - Ethnicities: Karenni; Bamar; Shan
  - Religions: Buddhism; Christianity
- Time zone: UTC+6:30 (MMT)

Loikaw Township (Western Kayah: ꤞꤤꤚꤤꤘꤢꤪ꤭ ꤠꤟꤤ꤭ꤗꤟꤌꤣ꤭, Burmese: လွိုင်ကော်‌မြို့နယ်) is a township in Loikaw District, Kayah State in eastern Myanmar. The principal town and capital of Kayah State lies at its principal town of Loikaw. The township contains three towns- the capital Loikaw, Lawpita and Loilinlay. The township also has 111 villages grouped into 12 village tracts.

Loikaw Township is located in northern Kayah State and is bordered by Shadaw Township to its east, Demoso Township to its west, Bawlakhe Township to its south and Pekhon Township, Shan State and Hsi Hseng Township in the Pa-O Self-Administered Zone to the north.

The township has an industrial zone with many manufacturers as of 2019. However, the township has been close to internal conflict in Myanmar and many residents were displaced from conflict during Operation 1111 in 2023 and is experiencing economic hardship.

== History ==
According to the Ministry of Home Affairs, a village was established by someone named U Thiri in 1838 and named Thiridaw. The village became known as Loikhaw in the Shan language, meaning "Distinguishing Mountain" referring to nearby Taungkwe Mountain. It various became know as Lweikaw and then eventually Loikaw. In 1888, the Sawphya (chieftain) of Kandarawadi established the Kandarawadi Palace in Loikaw, moving the capital of the state to Loikaw.

Loikaw was the Headquarters of the Political Officer in Charge of the Karenni States, part of the Princely States of British Burma, in 1922 during British rule in Burma. The town was located in the only flat part of the Karenni area. In 1892 it numbered four huts. As an Agent of the British government he was exercising control over the local Karenni Rulers, being supervised by the Superintendent at Taunggyi.

After Burma's independence in 1948, Loikaw was established as the capital of the Karenni State, later renamed as Kayah State in 1952.

On 11 November 2023, Karenni Nationalities Defence Force (KNDF) and Karenni Army forces started attacking Tatmadaw military bases around Loikaw starting Operation 1111. The coalition forces captured seven military bases and shot down an aircraft. Within two days, the KNDF took several positions from the Tatmadaw and began sieging Loikaw proper. By February 2024, the offensive stalled in the city with normalcy returning to the outskirs of Loikaw.

In 2024, no fighting was reported in the township until May, when the Tatmadaw launched a counteroffensive reaching the village of Kayan Tha Yar near the Loikaw-Mobye-Hsi Hseng highway intersection. Fighting intensified in July with reports of soldiers setting Loikaw Technological Univeristy and houses in villages surrounding Loikaw alight. In early August 2024, the Tatmadaw secured Loikaw, including much of its rural township, according to Tatmadaw claims and civilian reports. Fighting continued in the northern part of the township, along the Shan State border as part of a larger fight for Pekon Township, Shan State. Casaulties from airstrikes and fighting has continued through to November 2026 in Loikaw Township.

== Geography ==
Loikaw Township is located in northern Kayah State and is bordered by Shadaw Township to its east, Demoso Township to its west, Bawlakhe Township to its south and Pekhon Township, Shan State and Hsi Hseng Township in the Pa-O Self-Administered Zone to the north. The township contains three towns- the capital Loikaw, Lawpita and Loilinlay. The township also has 111 villages grouped into 12 village tracts.

Loikaw Township is mostly hilly and forested, with some flat terrain following the Baluchaung River and then Pun River. It contains the southern summit of the Thiri Mingalar mountain and other notable mountains like Mt. Myakalat and Mt. Shweletwa. 10 miles (16 km) east of Loikaw is Kyat Cave, a "ghost cave" with an broken wooden boxes believed to be coffins, without any bodies.

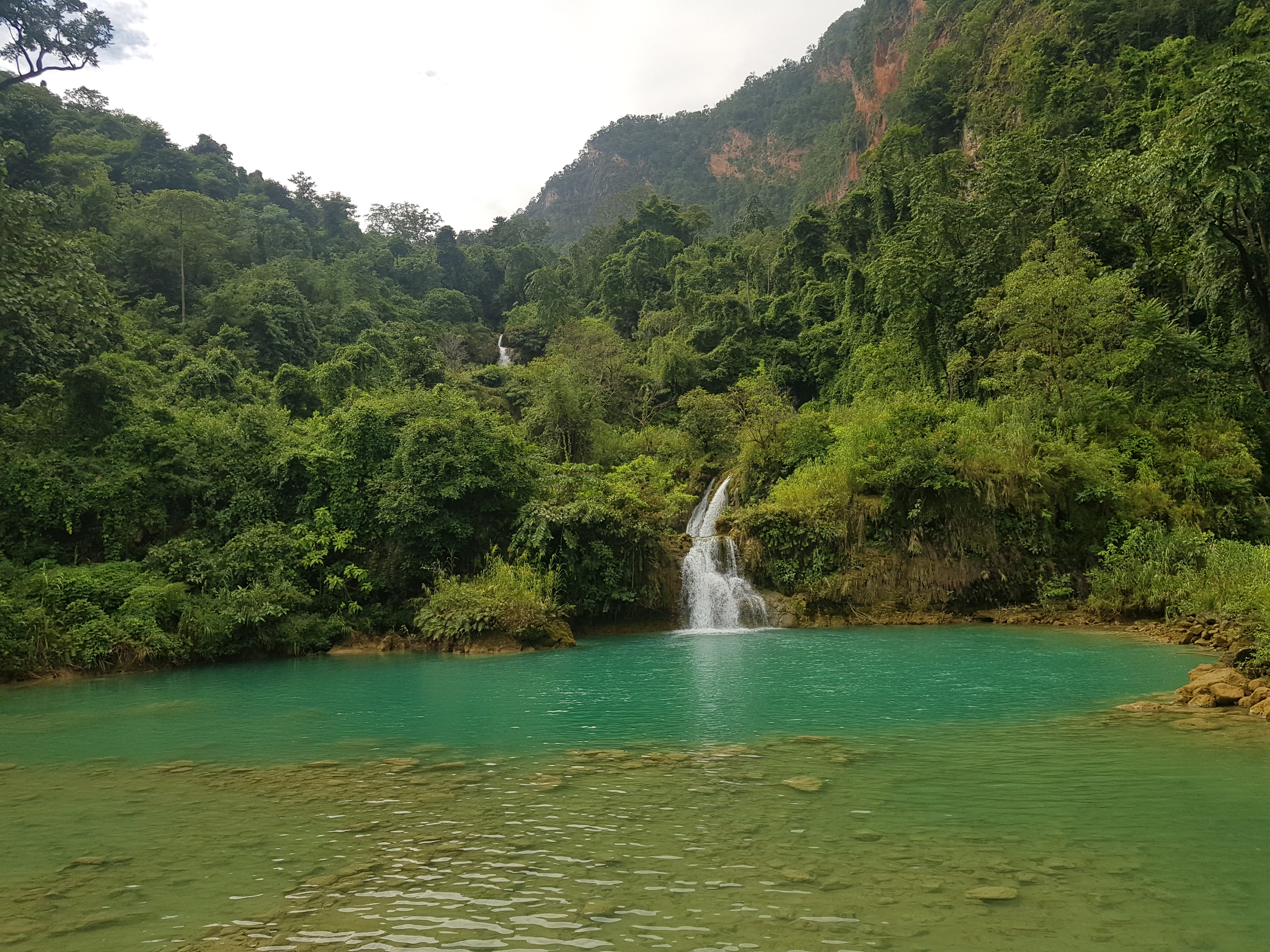
Lawpita Falls

Two of the dams in the larger Lawpita hydropower project lie within the township- the Lawpita Hydropower Plant I and Lawpita Hydropower Plant II situated near the town of Lawpita. The plants are also called Baluchaung I and II after the river that they dam. The nearby Lawpita Falls was damaged when the Lawpita II Plant was completed.

From 2022 to 2026, the average year saw 43.8 days with 20.63 inches (52.4 cm) of rain with significant variation. 2025 saw 50.39 inches (128.0 cm) of rain over 118 days while 2026 has only seen 4 days of rain for 1.26 inches (3.2 cm) of rain. Over the same period, the township saw highs ranging between 26°C and 36°C and lows ranging between 5.1°C and 10°C. The climate is considered cool and temperate. The area has a Köppen climate classification of being a monsoon-influenced humid subtropical climate (Cwa).

19.5% of the township's land is forested, with 71,539 acres (289.51 km^{2}) of protected forests (0.48% of the township's area). The town has several animal species including muntjac, sambar deer, hares, snakes, tortoises, monitor lizards, pangolins, herons and cranes. There are many tree species including eucalyptus, pine, Australian pine, red silk-cotton, Siamese sal, tamarind, Indian laurel, danyin and lebbeck trees. Various other species of plants are used in traditional ceremonies for the Karenni people. For example, the bark of the khasi tree is used to ward off bad spirits and a wax gourd is customarily kept on the 1st step of a ladder in house warming ceremonies.

== Demographics ==
Historical Population
Year	Pop.	±%
1973		—
1983		—
2014	128,401	—
2018	116,795	−9.0%
2019	118,264	+1.3%
2025	125,261	+5.9%
2026	124,485	−0.6%
Source: Ministry of Labor, Immigration, and Population and General Administration Department data

The 2014 Myanmar Census reported that Loikaw Township had a population of 128,401. The population density was 82.9 people per km^{2}. The census reported that the median age was 24.5 years, and 97 males per 100 females. There were 26,495 households; the mean household size was 4.6.

In 2019, the township's population fell to 118,264 people and the mean household size was 5.3.. In 2026, the township's population grew to 124,485 people and the mean household size fell to 4.0. The township is ethnically 39.2% Karenni (Kayah), 32.7% Bamar, 19.8% Shan and 3.8% Karen. 1.7% of the township is Indian Burmese

== Economy ==
Loikaw Township is an economically important township in Kayah State. The primary industries are agriculture, light manufacturing and the service sector. The township has access to the Baluchaung River and many roads, including National Highway 21 (formally NH5), connecting it to other major towns like Taunggyi and Taungoo. Loikaw is also on the Aungban-Loikaw Railway line.

The primary crops farmed in the township are rice, maize and sunflower seeds with lesser amounts farming Pigeon pea, peanuts, seasame, chilli peppers and potatoes. The primary plantation crop is bananas with some betel nut and coconut industries in the township. The township has 41 combine harvesters.

In 2019, there were 44 businesses in Loikaw's Nwa La Oe industrial zone, with the most common producing lumber and paper products. Other products like vegetable oils, animal feed, traditional textiles, galvanised iron and vehicle repair mechanics were also in the zone. Outside of the industrial zone, there were 47 other industrial businesses improving 195 workers. Products ranged from vermicelli to decorative stainless steel. In 2026, the General Administration Department was unable to survey the indsustrial zone and only noted one factory outside the zone producing bottled water.

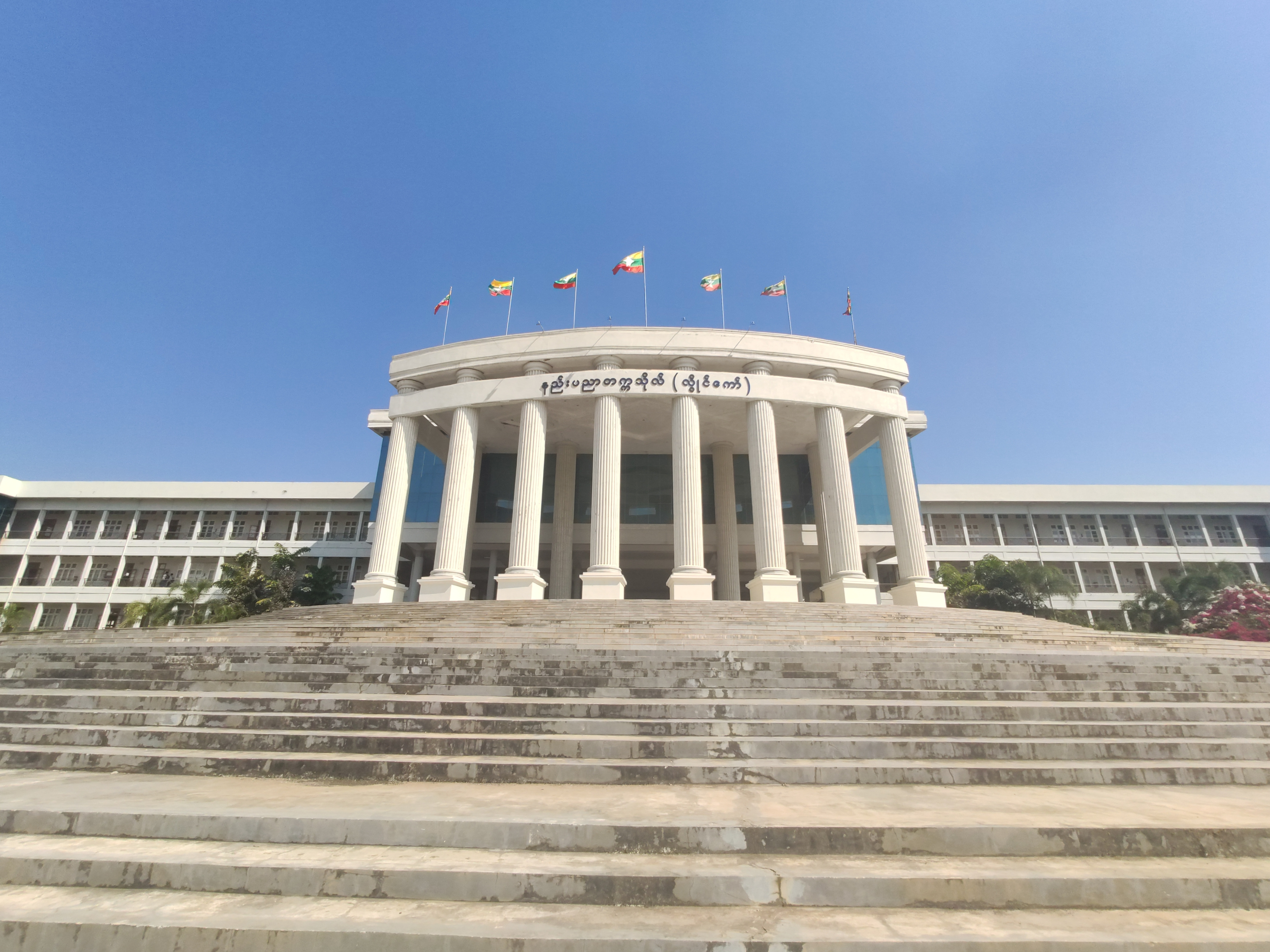
TU Loikaw Main Building

The township is home to Loikaw University, Technological University, Loikaw, Computer University, Loikaw, and Loikaw Education College. Loikaw's General Hospital serves not only locals in the state but also to those in the southern part of neighbouring Shan State.

The township's proximity to conflict throughout 20th and 21st century internal conflict in Myanmar has led to a high amount of landmines and other explosive remnants of war. 47 hazardous areas in 16 villages within Loikaw township was identified in 2017 by the Mines Advisory Group. Deteriorating security and increased conflict after the start of Operation 1111 in October 2023, caused increased in commodity prices in Loikaw Township. Military strikes on IDP camps also impacted the ability to deliver aid to those displaced from Loikaw town. During Quarter 4 of 2023, 40% of Loikaw's population had been displaced from their homes.

== Subdivisions ==
The township contains three towns- the capital Loikaw with 23 or 24 urban wards, and the towns of Lawpita with 8 wards and Loilinlay with 3 wards. The township also has 111 villages grouped into 12 village tracts.

The following are Loikaw Township's 12 village tracts in the township, which group together 111 legally recognised villages as of 2026.

- Chi Kei
- Daw Paw Ka Le
- Htee Se Khar
- Htee Ta Ngar
- Kone Thar
- Law Da Lay
- Ma Htaw Khu
- Noe Koe
- Nwar La Woe
- Pan Kan
- Par Laung
- Pein Chit
- Tee Lon
