= Baw Rei Soe Wai =

Burmese politician

Member of the Amyotha Hluttaw
- Incumbent
- Assumed office 1 February 2016
- Constituency: Kayah State No.3
- Majority: 8162 votes

Personal details
- Born: 11 May 1963 (age 62) Demoso Township, Kayah State, Burma (Myanmar)
- Party: National League for Democracy
- Spouse: Tar Me
- Parent(s): Maung Gyi (father); Soe May (mother)
- Education: Second Year at Yangon University
- Occupation: Politician

Baw Rei Soe Wai (Burmese: ဘော်ရယ်စိုးဝေ, born 11 May 1963) is a Burmese politician currently serving as a House of Nationalities MP for Kayah State No. 3 constituency.

== Early life and education ==
He was born on 11 May 1963 in Demoso Township, Kayah State, Burma (Myanmar).

== Political career ==
He is a member of the National League for Democracy. In the 2015 Myanmar general election, he was elected as an Amyotha Hluttaw MP, winning a majority of 8162 votes and elected representative from Kayah State No. 3 parliamentary constituency. He also serves as a member of Amyotha Hluttaw Public Complaints Committee.
