= Zee Pyar =

Village in Magway Region, Myanmar

- Location in Myanmar
- Coordinates: 22°07′46″N 94°04′01″E
- Country: Myanmar
- Division: Magway Region
- District: Gangaw District
- Township: Gangaw Township
- Time zone: UTC+6.30 (MMT)

Zee Pyar is a village in Gangaw Township, Gangaw District, Magway Region, Myanmar. The village was used as a base for Tatmadaw troops, police, and a Pyu Saw Htee militia prior to its capture by the People's Defence Force (PDF)

== History ==
=== Myanmar Civil War (2021 - Present) ===
In early October 2022, 17 Myanmar Junta troops were killed in a raid on a Zee Pyar training camp by the People's Defence Force.

In mid-November 2023, the Myaing People's Defence Force attacked Zee Pyar, burning the village's police station and reportedly killing over 30 Myanmar regime personnel.
