= Khin-U attacks =

2023 attacks during the Myanmar civil war

- Part of the Dry Zone theater of the Myanmar civil war (2021–present)
Date	29 January 2022 – present (4 years, 1 month and 3 days)
Location	Khin-U Township, Sagaing Region, Myanmar 22°46′08″N 95°37′18″E
Status	Ongoing

Belligerents
State Administration Council; Pyusawhti militias	People's Defence Force

Casualties and losses
7 dead, 13 wounded (PDF claim)	Unknown
- As of 25 August 2023: 6,000 refugees; 30,000 internally displaced; 6,000 homes destroyed; As of 2 January 2023: 240 PDF and civilians dead; 150 PDF and civilians arrested
- Location of the attacks within Myanmar

Since the beginning of the Myanmar civil war in 2021, the village of Khin-U and other surrounding settlements been attacked several times by groups associated with the ruling State Administration Council. As a result of the attacks, primarily conducted via artillery strikes and burnings of settlements, thousands have homes have been destroyed and thousands of local residents have been displaced.

== Timeline ==
Khin-U Township is located in Myanmar's ethnically-Bamar Dry Zone. Following the 2021 Myanmar coup d'état the local population overwhelmingly supported the deposed National League for Democracy, first taking up arms against the State Administration Council junta in March 2021. The Tatmadaw was characterised by allegations of collective punishment and disproportionate force by locals.

According to monitoring organisation Myanmar Witness, the earliest known claim of an attack in Khin-U Township dates to 29 January 2022, when the Kachin News Group posted an image alleged to be fires near the village of Yauk Thwar Aing on Facebook. Several arson attacks continued to be reported throughout the year and into the next. Radio Free Asia has also quoted residents of the township as stating that heavy artillery has been used on civilian buildings. As a result of attacks by the Tatmadaw, 6,000 individuals had fled their homes out of fear of reprisals, while an additional 30,000 had been displaced after the destruction of their homes during attacks.

The involvement of the pro-junta Pyusawhti militias in attacks in the township has also been alleged by locals. According to interviews, members of Pyusawhti militias have participated in the theft of property and food, with the intention of seizing anything that could help the People's Defence Force.

Local affiliates of the People's Defence Force has made efforts to respond, but operations have been severely hampered by the Tatmadaw's response. In June 2023, PDF soldiers ambushed the Tatmadaw near the town of Khin-U, claiming to kill seven and wound 13 in the ensuing battle before retreating. A drone operator from the PDF was also killed during the battle. Following the battle, the Tatmadaw attacked the village of Ye Aye Kone, destroying three homes and stealing food.

== List of fires ==
Name	Pop.	Date	More information
Yauk Thwar Aing	1,755	29 January 2022	Reported by Kachin News Group. Unconfirmed
Hman Taw	2,709	5 March 2022	Reported by Khit Thit Media. Unconfirmed
Ta Moke	Unknown	15 March 2022	First posted on Reddit, later confirmed via geolocation
Ku Lar Lu	Unknown	16 March 2022	First posted on Twitter, later confirmed via geolocation
Shar Lwin	2,968	16 March 2022	First posted on Telegram, later confirmed via satellite data
Ku Lar Lu	Unknown	30 March 2022	Reported by Khit Thit Media, later confirmed via satellite data
Ngar Inn Gyi	1,237	3 April 2022	Reported by Khin-U Revolution News, later confirmed via satellite data
Ywar Thar	2,008	23 April 2022	Reported by Khit Thit Media, later confirmed via satellite data
Than Bo	1,742	26 April 2022	First posted on Facebook, later confirmed via satellite data
Inn Pat	5,587	2 May 2022	Reported by Khit Thit Media. Unconfirmed
Thar Wut Hti	2,449	18 July 2022	Unconfirmed
Mon Hla	2,274	18 July 2022	Unconfirmed
Shar Taw	Unknown	18 July 2022	First posted on Facebook. Unconfirmed
Shar Taw	Unknown	18 July 2022	First posted on Facebook. Unconfirmed
Ngar Yon Gyi	1,237	18 July 2022	Unconfirmed
Shin Min Dway	1,136	18 July 2022	Reported by Ayeyarwaddy Times. Unconfirmed
Kyi Su	Unknown	19 July 2022	Information obtained via satellite data
Shin Min Dway	1,136	20 July 2022	Reported by Ayeyarwaddy Times, later confirmed via satellite data
Let Pan Hla	1,506	27 July 2022	Reported by Khit Thit Media. Unconfirmed
Inn Pat	5,587	24 September 2022	Reported by Khit Thit Media, later confirmed via geolocation
Paung Hle Kone	1,893	18 November 2022	Reported by Khit Thit Media, later confirmed via satellite data
Let Yet Kone	Unknown	18 November 2022	Reported by Khit Thit Media. Unconfirmed
Let Pan Gyi	1,096	20 November 2022	Reported by Khit Thit Media, later confirmed via satellite data
Ma Daung Gyi	1,367	20 November 2022	Reported by Mandalay Free Press, later confirmed via satellite data
Saw Gyi	2,262	21 November 2022	Reported by Mandalay Free Press, later confirmed via satellite data
Tha Nat Sein	Unknown	21 November 2022	Reported by Mandalay Free Press, later confirmed via satellite data
Mon Hla	2,274	24 November 2022	Reported by Radio Free Asia, later confirmed via satellite data
Myin Kya	Unknown	25 November 2022	Confirmed via satellite data
Myit Taw	Unknown	26 November 2022	Unconfirmed
Ah Lel Sho	2,918	1 January 2023	Reported by Myaelatt Athan, later confirmed via satellite data
Mya Kan	496	1 March 2023	Reported by Myaelatt Athan. Unconfirmed
