= Shadaw =

Shadaw ရှားတောမြို့
- Location in kusinger
- Coordinates: 19°36′0″N 97°31′0″E
- Country: Myanmar
- Division: Kayah State
- District: Loikaw District
- Township: Shadaw Township

Population (2005)
  - Religions: Buddhism
- Time zone: UTC+6.30 (MST)

Shadaw (Burmese: ရှားတောမြို့) is a town in the Kayah State of eastern part of Burma.
