= Raid on Hnan Khar =

Series of raids on Hnan Khar, Myanmar

Raids on Hnan Khar
- Part of the Myanmar civil war (2021–present) and the Myanmar conflict
Date	June 2021 – September 2022
Location	Hnan Khar, Gangaw Township, Myanmar
Status	SAC victory

Belligerents
State Administration Council; Tatmadaw; Myanmar Army; Myanmar Police Force	Local People's Defense Forces

Strength
Unknown	Unknown

Casualties and losses
At least 20 killed	Unknown
- Multiple civilian casualties

The Raids on Hnan Khar were a series of raids on the village of Hnan Khar, Gangaw Township, Magway Region by the Myanmar Tatmadaw junta. During these raids, junta soldiers committed various war crimes.
