= Battle of Myin Thar =

Series of clashes in Magway Region

Coordinates: 22°35′N 94°08′E

- Part of the Myanmar civil war (2021–present) and the Myanmar conflict
Date	9 September 2021 – 13 September 2021 (4 days)
Location	Myin Thar, Gangaw Township, Magway Region, Myanmar
Status	SAC victory

Belligerents
State Administration Council; Tatmadaw; Myanmar Army; Myanmar Police Force; Pyusawhti militias	Anti-coup forces; People's Defense Forces; Civil Disobedience Movement (CDM); Yaw militias

Strength
Unknown	Unknown

Casualties and losses
- At least 18 killed

The Battle of Myin Thar was an engagement between the Myanmar SAC junta and anti-coup forces in the village of Myin Thar, Gangaw Township, Magway Region. Tatmadaw forces raided the village two days after the National Unity Government called for a "people's defensive war" against the military. Yaw militias armed with improvised black powder rifles and grenade launchers heavily resisted until heavy artillery forced them to withdraw.

Numerous civilians, including a 50-year-old paralyzed man, were massacred by the Tatmadaw.
