= Aung Zaw Aye =

Burmese army officer

- အောင်ဇော်အေး

Chairman of Myanmar Economic Holding Limited
- Incumbent
- Assumed office February 2023
- Leader: Min Aung Hlaing

Commander of the Bureau of Special Operations No. 2
- In office 12.8.2019–7.7.2020
- Preceded by: Aung Kyaw Zaw
- Succeeded by: Win Bo Shein

Personal details
- Born: Burma (now Myanmar)
- Spouse: Soe Soe Htwe
- Children: Multiple, including: Su Mon Aye; Soe WuttYi Aye; Nyi Nyi Than Aye

Military service
- Allegiance: Tatmadaw
- Branch/service: Myanmar Army
- Rank: Lieutenant General

Lieutenant General Aung Zaw Aye (Burmese: အောင်ဇော်အေး) is a Burmese military officer.

== Military career ==
Aung Zaw Aye has been reshuffled several times throughout his military career. He previously served as the commander of Bureau of Special Operations No. 2 and inspector general.

In the aftermath of the 2021 Myanmar coup d'état, Aung Zaw Aye led efforts to dissuade major ethnic armed organisations from joining the resistance movement and the National Unity Government. In April 2021, he and Yar Pyae met with United Wa State Army and the Shan State Progress Party to maintain relations with the Burmese military.

In March 2022, he was sanctioned by the European Union for committing military atrocities and abuses, particularly for his culpability in the Mo So massacre in December 2021.

In February 2023, he was appointed Chief Minister of Shan State.

== See also ==
- 2021 Myanmar coup d'état
- State Administration Council
- Tatmadaw
