= Tin Soe =

Burmese army officer

- တင်စိုး

Personal details
- Born: Burma (now Myanmar)

Military service
- Allegiance: Myanmar
- Branch/service: Myanmar Army
- Rank: Major General

Major General Tin Soe (Burmese: တင်စိုး) is a Burmese military officer. From 2019 to 2021, he served as the military attaché for the Myanmar embassy in Tokyo, Japan. Following the 2021 Myanmar coup d'etat, he returned to Myanmar and was promoted to the rank of brigadier general. From August 2021 to July 2022, he was deployed to the Eastern Command headquarters in Taunggyi, Shan State. In December 2021, troops from the Eastern Command committed the Mo So massacre, which killed 44 civilians. In August 2022, Human Rights Watch reported that Tin Soe trained at the Joint Staff College, which is run by the Ministry of Defense (Japan). In September 2022, the Japanese government announced it was suspending training programs for the Burmese military starting in 2023.

== See also ==
- 2021 Myanmar coup d'état
- Mo So massacre
- Tatmadaw
