= Kawkareik =

Kawkareik ဒူဖျၢ်ယၢ်ဝ့ၢ်ဖိ ဍုံကောဝ်တြာ် Kawkaraik
- Town
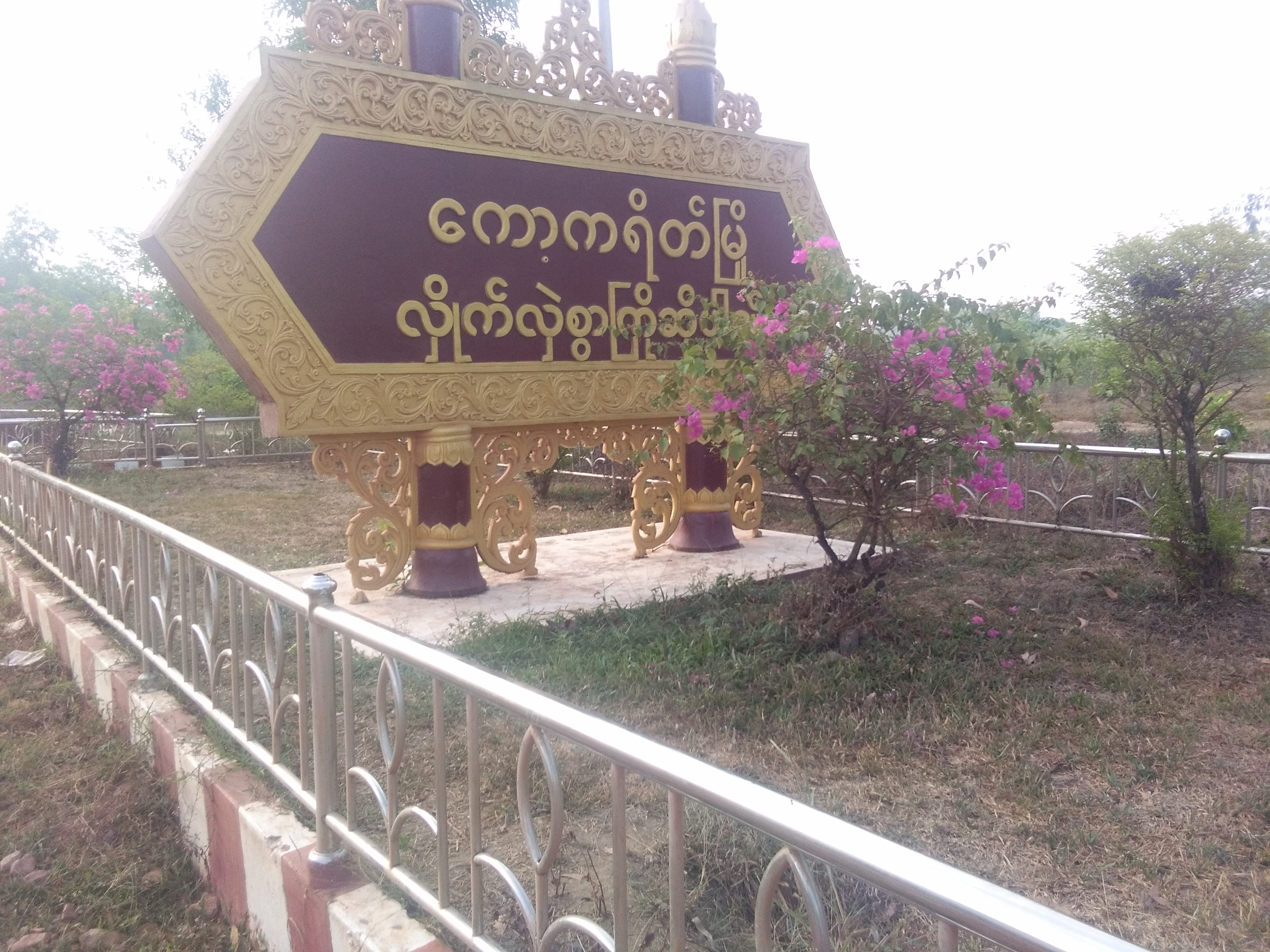
- The former sign of Kawkareik. The sign reads: "A warm welcome from Kawkareik." It was demolished in 2020s and replaced with the new one.

- Location in Myanmar (Burma)
- Coordinates: 16°33′20″N 98°14′24″E
- Country: Myanmar
- Division: Kayin State
- District: Kawkareik District
- Township: Kawkareik Township

Population (2019)
  - Total: 48,468
  - Religions: Buddhism; Christianity
- Time zone: UTC+6.30 (MMT)

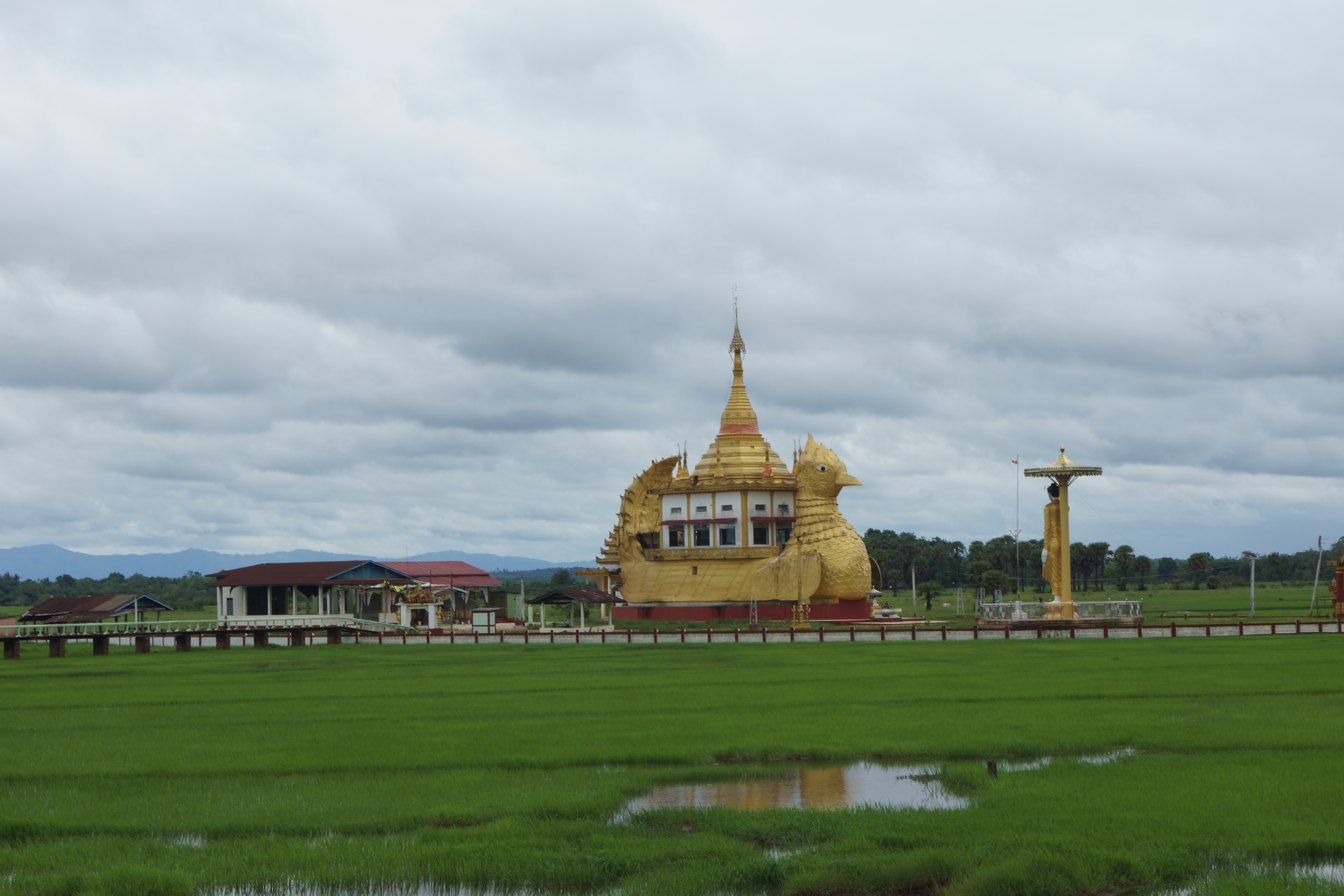
Kyaikpawt Pagoda, Minywar Village, Kawkareik Township

Kawkareik (Pwo Eastern Karen: ဍုံကောဝ်တြာ်; Burmese: ကော့ကရိတ်, [kɔ̰kəɹeɪʔ]; S'gaw Karen: ဒူဖျၢ်ယၢ်ဝ့ၢ်ဖိ; Mon: ကအ်ကြိက်), also spelled as Kawkarike, is a town in Karen State, Myanmar. It is the capital of Kawkaraik District and Kawkaraik Township.

== History ==
The Kawkareik Pass across the Tenasserim Hills is named after this town. The Pass was the access route from Thailand used by the Japanese Fifteenth Army, consisting of two infantry divisions under Lieutenant General Shōjirō Iida, when it invaded the southern Burmese division of Tenasserim (now Mon State, Kayin State and Tanintharyi Region) in January 1942.

In January 2009, the forces of the Karen National Union and the Democratic Karen Buddhist Army clashed outside Kawkareik. The DKBA set up their military command post inside the town, and although DKBA soldiers burned down several civilian houses and detained dozens of citizens in villages across the border in Thailand, Kawkareik was left intact.

During the Myanmar civil war that began in 2021, the battle of Kawkareik took place in late October 2022. The Karen National Liberation Army (KNLA) stepped-up fighting in southeastern Myanmar and besieged the town. At the time, it appeared to be a significant first seizure of a major town by anti-junta forces since the renewed civil war.

== Climate ==
Kawkareik has a typical southeastern Myanmar tropical monsoon climate (Köppen Am) featuring an extremely wet wet season from mid-April to early November and a dry season from November to mid-April.

Climate data for Kawkareik (1981–2010)
Month	Jan	Feb	Mar	Apr	May	Jun	Jul	Aug	Sep	Oct	Nov	Dec	Year
Mean daily maximum °C (°F)	33.3 (91.9)	35.0 (95.0)	36.7 (98.1)	37.6 (99.7)	34.4 (93.9)	30.4 (86.7)	29.4 (84.9)	29.2 (84.6)	31.1 (88.0)	33.3 (91.9)	33.6 (92.5)	32.6 (90.7)	33.1 (91.6)
Mean daily minimum °C (°F)	17.6 (63.7)	18.2 (64.8)	20.1 (68.2)	22.5 (72.5)	22.9 (73.2)	22.6 (72.7)	22.3 (72.1)	22.2 (72.0)	22.7 (72.9)	22.7 (72.9)	21.4 (70.5)	19.2 (66.6)	21.2 (70.2)
Average rainfall mm (inches)	3.5 (0.14)	9.6 (0.38)	22.6 (0.89)	73.8 (2.91)	407.5 (16.04)	833.2 (32.80)	1,049.4 (41.31)	1,105.7 (43.53)	616.6 (24.28)	234.2 (9.22)	33.7 (1.33)	7.1 (0.28)	4,396.9 (173.11)
Source: Norwegian Meteorological Institute

== Transport ==
Kawkareik lies on the East-West Economic Corridor that links the South China Sea at Da Nang to Mawlamyine through Mae Sot and Myawaddy.

The town has two public high schools; BEHS (1) Kawkareik and BEHS (2) Kawkareik.

There is no higher education institution in Kawkareik.

== Healthcare ==
Kawkareik District Public Hospital serves the people of Kawkareik and its surrounding areas.

== Notable people from Kawkareik ==
- Diramore
- Naing Thet Lwin
