= Battle of Taze =

Series of clashes in Sagaing Region

Coordinates: 22°57′N 95°23′E

- Part of the Myanmar civil war (2021–present) and the Myanmar conflict
Date	April 7, 2021 – present (4 years, 10 months, 3 weeks and 3 days)
Location	Taze Township, Shwebo District, Sagaing Region, Myanmar
Status	Ongoing

Belligerents
State Administration Council (Note: 2021–2025)/State Security and Peace Commission (Note: 2025–present); Tatmadaw; Myanmar Army; Myanmar Police Force; Pyusawhti militias	National Unity Government; People's Defence Force; Taze Township People's Defense Forces; Civil Disobedience Movement (CDM); Armed civilians

Strength
Unknown	Unknown

Casualties and losses
Over 8 killed or wounded.	Over 11 killed (including civilians); Many wounded

The Battle of Taze is an ongoing engagement between the Myanmar SAC junta and anti-military forces in Taze Township, Sagaing Region.
