= Battle of Namhsan =

Engagement during the Myanmar Civil War (2023)

Coordinates: 22°58′N 97°20′E

- Part of Operation 1027 of the Myanmar civil war (2021–present)
Date	10 December – 15 December 2023 (5 days)
Location	Namhsan, Namhsan Township, Pa Laung Self-Administered Zone, Myanmar
Result	TNLA victory

Belligerents
Ta'ang National Liberation Army	State Administration Council

Strength
Unknown	100+

Casualties and losses
Unknown	At least 60 dead, >64 taken prisoner
- At least 3 civilians

The Battle of Namhsan was an offensive by the TNLA against the Myanmar military junta during Operation 1027. The TNLA attacked numerous military bases and police stations while fending off reinforcements exiting Y-12 and ATR-42 planes, along with air support from Mi-35 helicopters and fighter jets.

After the battle, the TNLA captured large caches of weapons and ammunition from police stations and military bases.
