= Myaelatt Athan =

- Native name: မြေလတ်အသံ
- Type: News agency
- Industry: Mass media
- Founded: April 2019; 7 years ago
- Headquarters: Myanmar
- Area served: Sagaing Region, Magway Region, Bago Region
- Website: myaelattathan.org

Myaelatt Athan (Burmese: မြေလတ်အသံ) is a Myanmar-based news agency founded in April 2019. The agency provides regional news coverage focusing on the central parts of Myanmar, specifically the Sagaing, Magway, and Bago regions.

== Post-2021 history and legal incidents ==
Since the 2021 Myanmar coup d'état, several journalists associated with Myaelatt Athan have been detained or sentenced by the military authorities under various laws.

=== Arrests of journalists ===
- Than Htike Myint: A correspondent for Myaelatt Athan, was arrested in Myanaung Township, Ayeyarwady Region, on 6 February 2025. On 3 April 2025, he was sentenced to five years in prison by a military court under Section 52(a) of the Anti-Terrorism Law. The prosecution alleged that evidence of communication with the People's Defense Force (PDF) was found on his mobile phone. He is currently being held at Hinthada Prison.
- Aung Gyi: On 4 July 2021, Aung Gyi, a reporter for Myaelatt Athan based in Paungde Township, Bago Region, was detained alongside his father. His arrest was documented by the Assistance Association for Political Prisoners (AAPP).

== See also ==
- Media of Myanmar
- The Irrawaddy
- Myanmar Now
