= Muse clashes =

- Part of the Myanmar conflict
Date	23 May – 2 December 2021 (6 months, 1 week and 2 days)
Location	Muse Township, Shan State, Myanmar
Result	Inconclusive

Belligerents
Myanmar	Northern Alliance

Units involved
Tatmadaw; Myanmar Army; Northeastern Command; Myanmar Air Force; Myanmar Police Force; Border Guard Police	Northern Alliance; Arakan Army; Kachin Independence Army; Myanmar National Democratic Alliance Army; Ta'ang National Liberation Army

Casualties and losses
At least 5 dead, one helicopter shot down	Unknown
- At least 1 civilian hit by landmines.

Three months after the 2021 Myanmar coup d'etat, the Muse clashes erupted between the Myanmar military and the Northern Alliance. According to the Democratic Voice of Burma, gunfire broke out in Muse on 23 May 2024. Fighting also took place in the Chinese border area of Mongko between the MNDAA and the Myanmar Army.
