= 2021 Myawaddy clashes =

Myawaddy Clashes
- Part of the Myanmar civil war (2021–present) and the Myanmar conflict
Date	June 2021 – December 2021
Location	Myawaddy Township, Myanmar
Result	Inconclusive

Belligerents
DKBA-5 Karen National Liberation Army ABSDF People's Defense Force	State Administration Council: Myanmar Army; Karen Border Guard Force

Commanders and leaders
	Min Aung Hlaing; Saw Chit Thu

Strength
Unknown	Unknown

Casualties and losses
4 ABSDF members captured	3 police officers captured
- 1 firefighter captured; 400 villagers fled to Thailand

The Myawaddy clashes erupted on 1 June 2021, when Myanmar Army and Karen BGF crossed into DKBA-5 territory in retaliation for the latter group capturing three police officers and a firefighter from Waw Lay Township. According to DKBA Major General Kyaw Thet, KNLA, PDF, and BGF defectors participated in the battle. During the fighting, a Myanmar Army artillery shell landed in Thailand, but did not explode.

On 2 November 2021, the Myanmar Army raided an ABSDF liaison office and arrested four staff members on unknown charges.

As clashes erupted into December 2021, the Thai Border Patrol Police strengthened security around Mae Sot after more stray shells landed in Thailand. Thai soldiers also visited refugee camps to provide aid.
