= Battle of Theemuhta =

Battle in the Myanmar civil war

Battle of Theemuhta သီးမူထာတိုက်ပွဲ
- Part of the Myanmar civil war (2021–present) and the Myanmar conflict
| Date | 27 March 2021 |
| Location | Thee Mu Hta, Hpapun District, Myanmar |
| Result | KNU victory |

Belligerents
| Karen National Union | State Administration Council |

Strength
| Unknown | Unknown |

Casualties and losses
| 4 killed | 10+ killed, 8 captured |

The Battle of Theemuhta was an engagement that took place during the current Myanmar civil war in the Hpapun District, the Karen National Union raided the Theemuhta military base and wiped out the State Administration Council defenders.

== Battle ==
The Karen National Union raided the Hteemuhta military base on 27 March during Myanmar's Armed Forces Day, the Karen National Union killed at least 10 and captured 8 Junta troops.
