= 2021 Mandalay Boarding House Raid =

Series of clashes in Mandalay

- Part of the Myanmar civil war (2021–present) and the Myanmar conflict
Date	22 June 2021
Location	Mandalay, Myanmar
Status	SAC victory

Belligerents
State Administration Council; Tatmadaw; Myanmar Army; Myanmar Police Force	People's Defense Forces

Strength
At least 20 soldiers and three armored vehicles	Unknown

Casualties and losses
At least 8 killed (PDF claim); some serious injuries (SAC claim)	At least 8 killed or captured (SAC claim); 6 captured (PDF claim)

The 2021 Mandalay Boarding House Raid occurred on 22 June 2021, when the Tatmadaw raided a former boarding house which was being used as a safehouse for the Mandalay People's Defense Force. According to military sources such as Myawaddy TV, Tatmadaw forces killed four PDF fighters, arrested eight others, and seized various weapons. The military also claimed that a white car occupied by four guerrillas conducted a failed ambush attempt before all of them were killed when they crashed into a transformer.

However, the PDF claimed that only six of their members were arrested by the Tatmadaw while eight soldiers died.
