= Battle of Mepali Camp =

Battle during the Myanmar civil war (2025)

Coordinates: 17°26′08″N 96°53′16″E

- Part of the Myanmar civil war (2021–present)
Date	1 January 2025 – 1 February 2025 (1 month)
Location	Mepali village, Bilin Township
Result	Resistance victory

Belligerents
State Administration Council	Karen National Union; National Unity Government; Bamar People's Liberation Army; Force for Federal Democracy

Units involved
Southeastern Command: 405th Infantry Battalion	Karen National Liberation Army: KNLA Brigade 1; People's Defense Force: PDF Southern Military Region Command; PDF 27th Brigade; Bamar People's Liberation Army; Force for Federal Democracy

Strength
100~	Unknown

Casualties and losses
40 killed, 52 captured	2 killed

The Battle of Mepali Camp was an assault on the Myanmar Army strategic camp in Mepali Village, Bilin Township, by a coalition of resistance forces including the Karen National Liberation Army, People's Defense Force, Bamar People's Liberation Army, and Force for Federal Democracy.

== Background ==
It is reported that some of the officers and soldiers stationed in Mepali Strategic Camp participated in abuses against local civilians. On October 11th, 2024, the commander of the 405th battalion (a lieutenant-colonel), as well as a captain, a lance corporal, and a private got drunk in Mepali village and severely beat 8 villagers without reason and left them at the village hospital. One of the villagers died of his injuries the day after. The lieutenant-colonel also threatened to rape two women.

== Battle ==
Footage of the Mepali Camp battle recorded by the Bamar People's Liberation Army.

Beginning on the first week of January, the coalition of resistance forces would encircle the Mepali Strategic Camp and attack it with mortar fire and probing infantry actions. SAC forces stationed in Kyaikto Township fired heavy artillery and launched air strikes against the rebel positions. Still, these proved ineffective to dislodge the rebel forces. However, the usage of heavy weapons did cause the displacement of 3,000 civilians from Mepali and Ahsuchaung village tracts. On February 1 at 11 AM, the various groups of the coalition began their assault into the base. The perimeter fence of the camp was breached and the rebels quickly ran into the camp's trenches to engage in close-quarters fighting with the junta soldiers. Once the rebels took control of the camp and all its trenches, they continued firing into the treeline around the camp until the remnants of the force stationed there surrendered and were taken into custody by the resistance factions. 40 Myanmar Army soldiers were killed during the fighting. About 29 prisoners of war were taken immediately after the battle.

== Aftermath and importance ==
After the rebel forces took control of the Mepali Strategic Camp, they seized a 122mm howitzer, various mortars, rifles, and ammunition. Among the captured POWs were various officers of different ranks. Some soldiers and officers stationed at the Mepali Camp were able to escape during the fighting, including a battalion commander. On February 9th, an officer from the People's Defense Force Southern Military Command stated that 25 soldiers who fled the fighting had been arrested, raising the total amount of POWs to 52.

The victory coincided with the anniversary of the 2021 coup d'état in Myanmar.
