= Chindwin River ambushes =

- Part of Myanmar civil war (2021–present)
Date	26 May 2021 – ongoing (4 years, 9 months and 5 days)
Location	Chindwin River, Myanmar

Belligerents
People's Defense Force	(Myanmar) State Administration Council: Myanmar Army

Commanders and leaders
Various	Min Aung Hlaing

Casualties and losses
6+	20+

The Chindwin River ambushes are a series of ambushes conducted by the People's Defense Force (PDF) and local anti-junta militias against Myanmar Army supply boats traveling across the Chindwin. Initially, anti-junta forces relied on single-shot Tumi guns to ambush the boats. As the Myanmar civil war raged on, the PDF and allied local militias would eventually use automatic weapons and explosives to attack the boats.
