= Battle of Demoso (2022) =

- Part of the Karenni theater in the Myanmar civil war
Date	1 January 2022 – November 2023
Location	Demoso, Demoso Township, Karenni State, Myanmar 19.544°N 97.162°E
Result	Karenni victory in November 2023.

Belligerents
Karenni Nationalities Defence Force: Karenni PDF; Karenni National Progressive Party: Karenni Army	Tatmadaw

Units involved
Unknown	427th Light Infantry Battalion

Casualties and losses
At least 15 dead	At least 350 killed (anti-junta claim)
- At least 2 dead; more than 150,000 displaced

The Second Battle of Demoso began when the Myanmar Tatmadaw attacked Karenni positions to retake parts of Demoso controlled by anti-junta forces.

During the battle, the Tatmadaw destroyed numerous churches and schools.

Demoso was captured by the Karenni during their offensive in November 2023. After which it was controlled by Karenni State Interim Executive Council until Tatmadaw's offensive which eventually would result in the capture of Demoso. In the meanwhile it became a refugee hub serving some 150,000 refugees alone. Many of whom now have to flee war again.
