= Katha Township clashes =

Clashed during the Myanmar civil war (2021-present)

Coordinates: 24°13′N 96°08′E

- Part of the Myanmar civil war
Date	30 May 2021 – ongoing (4 years, 9 months and 3 days)
Location	Katha Township, Sagaing Region, Myanmar

Belligerents
People's Defense Force; Kachin Independence Army; All Burma Students' Democratic Front	(Myanmar) State Administration Council: Myanmar Army

Commanders and leaders
Various	Min Aung Hlaing

Casualties and losses
At least 2 casualties	At least 50 killed, wounded, or captured.

The Katha Township clashes denote a series of clashes between the Tatmadaw, the Kachin Independence Army, the All Burma Students' Democratic Front, and the People's Defense Force in Katha Township, Sagaing Region, Myanmar.

== 2021 ==
On 30 May 2021, a police station in Moe La Tay village was set ablaze by unknown gunmen. Katha PDF and the KIA then clashed with the Tatmadaw. 8 soldiers were killed; 13 were wounded, and 1 was captured.

The PDF claimed that 44 Tatmadaw troops were killed during fighting between 24 June to 26 June 2021. According to KIO spokesperson, Colonel Naw Bu, individual fighters possibly collaborated with the PDFs at their own discretion without order from the KIA.

On 20 September 2021, KIA and PDF forces attacked Tatmadaw forces on the banks of the Irrawaddy River near the village of Moedar.

== 2022 ==
On 22 January 2022, a joint force of the PDF, KIA, and the ABSDF ambushed a Myanmar Army force near Nant Hlaing. Anti-junta forces claimed at least 7 troops were killed.

== 2023 ==
ABSDF and PDF forces clashed with 120 Myanmar Army troops in Chaunghwa village on 25 January 2023.

== 2024 ==
During the Battle of Bhamo, the KIA ambushed military ships on the Irrawaddy River near Katha Township to prevent supplies from reaching Tatmadaw troops.

== 2025 ==
On 15 March 2025, 150 Tatmadaw soldiers, part of Light Infantry Battalion 150, were ambushed by PDF and KIA forces near the Natyaetwin-Pinmalut intersection during a patrol. 2 rebels were killed, while at least 33 soldiers were either killed or taken prisoner.
