= Battle of Chinshwehaw =

- Part of Operation 1027 in the Myanmar civil war
- Map of Operation 1027 overall as of February 2024 (Not including gains made by anti-SAC forces before 27 October) Gains made by anti-SAC forces
Date	27 October 2023 – 1 November 2023 (5 days)
Location	Chinshwehaw; Laukkaing Township; China-Myanmar border 23°28′32″N 98°49′27″E
Result	MNDAA victory
Territorial changes	MNDAA captures Chinshwehaw and surrounding areas

Belligerents
State Administration Council: Kokang BGF	Myanmar National Democratic Alliance Army and allied forces

Commanders and leaders
Min Aung Hlaing	Peng Daxun

Units involved
Tatmadaw: Myanmar Army; Northeastern Command; Myanmar Air Force; Border Guard Force	Myanmar National Democratic Alliance Army

Strength
Unknown	Unknown

Casualties and losses
"Dozens killed, captured, or wounded" (MNDAA claim)	Unknown
- Numerous civilian casualties; reportedly 500 displaced persons

The Battle of Chinshwehaw was one of the first engagements of Operation 1027. MNDAA fighters attacked military bases, border checkpoints, and police stations. SAC spokesperson, Zaw Min Tun, claimed that they seized a hotel and took hostages.

By 1 November 2023, the SAC conceded that the MNDAA captured the town. Besides seizing numerous weapons and armored vehicles, the MNDAA controls one of the major trade points between Myanmar and China.
