= Lay Kay Kaw =

Lay Kay Kaw လေးကေ့ကော်
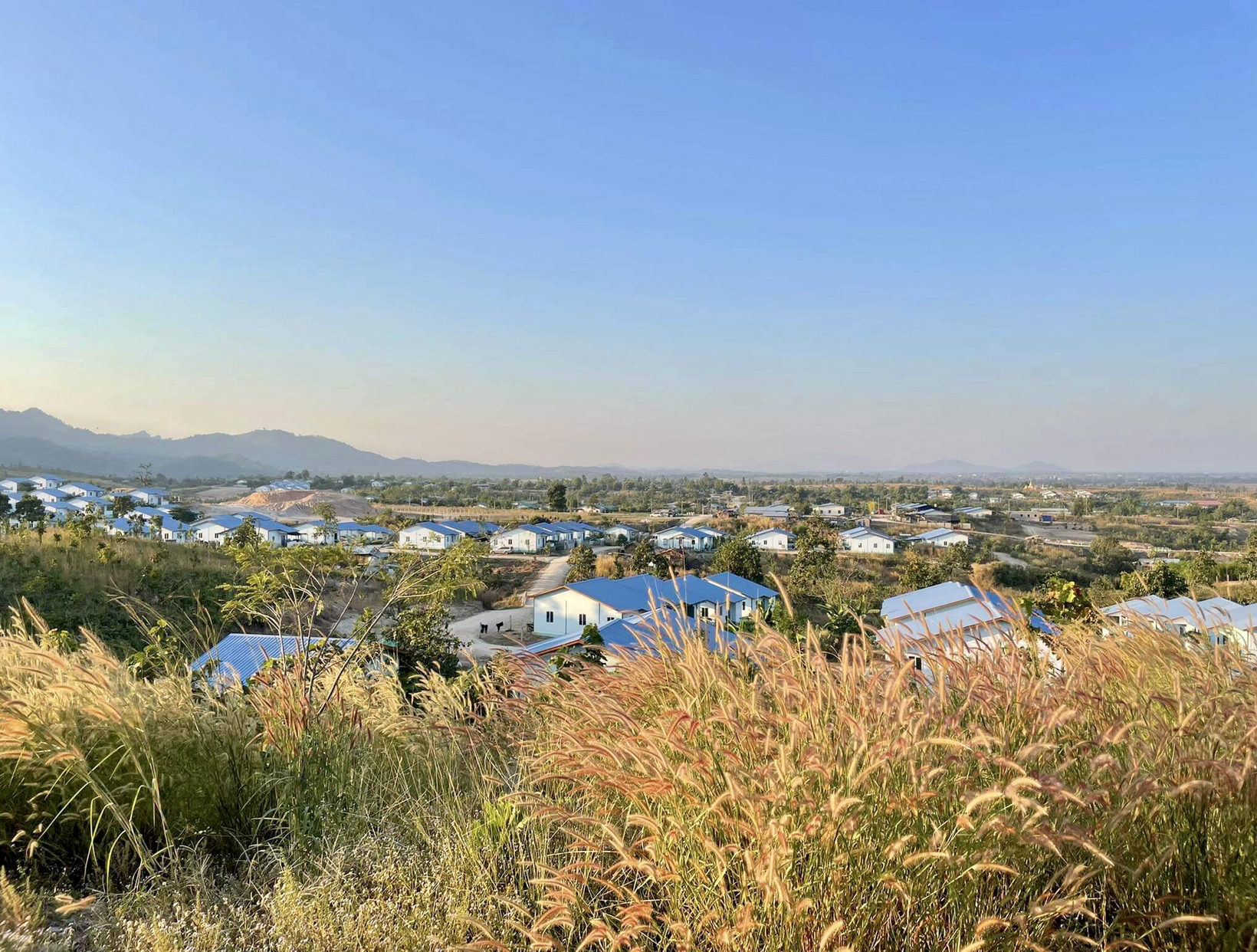
- Lay Kay Kaw Myothit

- Location of Lay Kay Kaw, Myanmar
- Coordinates: 16°35′57″N 98°31′27″E
- Country: Myanmar
- State: Kayin
- District: Myawaddy
- Founded: 2015
- Time zone: UTC+6.30 (MST)

Lay Kay Kaw Myothit (Burmese: လေးကေ့ကော်မြို့သစ်; lit. 'Lay Kay Kaw New Town') is an unofficial town in Myawaddy Township, Kayin State in southeastern Myanmar. Nine miles in the south of Myawaddy, it is close to the border with Thailand.

In recognition of the Burmese military's negotiations with Karen National Union, the oldest ethnic armed organization in the country, Lay Kay Kaw was built as a "town of peace" in 2015.

== History ==
=== 2015–2020 ===
With the support of Nippon Foundation, Lay Kay Kaw was built in 2015 as a cooperation between the then-chief minister of Kayin State, Zaw Min, and KNU's chairperson, Saw Mutu Say Poe. Divided into six quarters, it has a population of more than 3000. Despite administration of the Kayin State Government, the town has been controlled de facto by the KNU for six years.

=== After the 2021 coup d'état ===
Since February 2021, anti-coup protesters and those who joined the civil disobedience movement came to Lay Kay Kaw to evade the military. After the military conducted a search in the town in 14 December, clashes broke out between the military and local armed groups the next day. At least 2500 local villagers fled to Mae Sot, border town in Thailand. After a shell landed in a sugarcane plantation, and a small fire broke out, Thai authorities, through Thai–Myanmar Border Committee, issued a warning that "it was prepared to retaliate if stray artillery shells landed on Thai soil", and Thai armed forces were deployed in the border area. On 20 December, KNU urged the UN and international community to establish the area as a no-fly zone.

On April 21, 2024, 24 Filipinos trafficked by a Chinese scam centre in the town's Dong Feng Park were rescued by police attachés of the Philippine Embassy of Thailand with the cooperation of Thai authorities.
