= Kyar Ma Thauk =

Kyar Ma Thauk ကျားမသောက်
- Village
- Location in Myanmar (Burma)
- Coordinates: 20°10′27″N 92°53′40″E
- Country: Myanmar
- Division: Rakhine State
- District: Sittwe District
- Township: Sittwe Township
- Time zone: UTC+6.30 (MMT)

Kyar Ma Thauk (Burmese: ကျားမသောက်) is a village located in Sittwe Township, Rakhine State, Myanmar. The village is close to near the junta's Sittwe Regional Operations Command. As of 2022, the village was recorded to have 260 household. About 18% of the Kyar Ma Thauk River in compared to other rivers in Sittwe is in use.

The area is a hand-weaving industry, where the Shwe Kyar weaving workshop in the village has over 120 looms, but as of 2022, it is running with only fraction of it.

During the Myanmar civil war, clashing has occurred between Arakan Army and Myanmar military. On 27 December 2024, fighting had occurred after AA fired five rounds of mortar shells into junta military base checkpoint in the village. During the battle of Sittwe, AA has launched attacks to capture the regional command headquarters in the village.
