= Shadaw Township =

Coordinates: 19.6000°N 97.5167°E

Shadaw Township ရှားတော‌မြို့နယ်
- Township
- Location in Loikaw district
- Country: Myanmar
- State: Kayah State
- District: Loikaw District
- Capital: Shadaw
- Time zone: UTC+6:30 (MMT)

Shadaw Township (Burmese: ရှားတော‌မြို့နယ်) is a township of Loikaw District in the eastern part of Kayah State in Myanmar.
