= Siege of Ti Bwar =

2023 military engagement in Myanmar

- Part of Myanmar civil war (2021–present)
Date	15 November 2022 – 15 November 2023 (1 year)
Location	Ti Bwar, Myanmar 23.12836°N 93.44617°E
Result	Chin victory

Belligerents
Chin National Defence Force; Mountain Eagle Defence Force; Chinland Defense Force	State Administration Council

Strength
	35 soldiers (2022)

Casualties and losses
Chin claim: Four fighters injured	Chin claim: 25 killed

The siege of Ti Bwar or Tibual was a year-long military operation during the ongoing conflict in Myanmar by Chinland forces against a junta outpost at Ti Bwar, Falam Township, Chin State.

== Siege ==
On 15 November 2022, Chin forces began assault on a junta camp at Ti Bwar using multiple drones to drop more than 300 bombs on the outpost. On the first day four jet fighters dropped bombs on insurgents in the morning and evening. Eight soldiers were reportedly killed and two insurgents injured. On the second day at least five Myanmar soldiers were reportedly killed with junta MI-35 attacking insurgent forces for 20 minutes. On 17 November, Mountain Eagle Defence Force (MEDF) forces dropped bombs on the outpost reportedly killing six soldiers and wounding many, with one insurgent being injured. On 18 November four soldiers were reportedly killed and one CNDF fighter injured. On 19 November junta forces installed drone jamming device preventing insurgents from conducting further attacks. On 20 November, the Chin insurgents claimed to have killed at least five soldiers after ambushing them in the Bualte village at around 5pm. In retaliation soldiers burned down people's homes in the village.

Chin forces claimed that out of 34 soldiers at the outpost, 25 were killed, and many other injured. Four drones were lost during the attack but Chin forces were unable the seize the outpost due to airstrikes.

At night of 14 November 2023 Chin forces stormed the camp again. At 5am 15 November they managed to overrun it, setting it ablaze and capturing substantial quality of weapons and ammunition. 29 soldiers stationed there fled to India. They were repatriated back to Myanmar a few days later.
