= Naing Naing Oo =

Burmese military officer

His Excellency Major General Naing Naing Oo
- နိုင်နိုင်ဦး

Commander of Bureau of Special Operations No. 2 (BSO 2)
- Incumbent
- Assumed office February 2024
- Preceded by: Aung Zaw Aye

Commander of the Northeastern Command
- In office May 2021 – April 2023

Commander of the Eastern Central Command
- In office April 2021 – May 2021

Personal details
- Education: Defence Services Academy

Military service
- Allegiance: Myanmar
- Branch/service: Myanmar Army
- Rank: Major General

Naing Naing Oo (Burmese: နိုင်နိုင်ဦး; pronounced pronounced [nàiɰ̃ nàiɰ̃ ʔù]) is a Burmese military officer who has held senior roles within the Tatmadaw. Since February 2024, he has commanded the Bureau of Special Operations No. 2 (BSO 2). Previously, he led the Northeastern and Eastern Central Commands, overseeing operations in conflict-affected regions of Shan State.

== Early life and education ==
Naing Naing Oo was born in Myanmar. He graduated from the 35th intake of the Defence Services Academy, Myanmar's main military academy for officer training.

== Military career ==
In April 2021, Naing Naing Oo was appointed commander of the Eastern Central Command as a brigadier general. The following month, he assumed command of the Northeastern Command and was promoted to major general by July 2021.

During his tenure from May 2021 to April 2023, the Northeastern Command conducted operations in northern Shan State amid escalated conflict with the Three Brotherhood Alliance, comprising the Arakan Army, MNDAA, and TNLA.

=== Appointment to BSO 2 ===
Naing Naing Oo was promoted and assigned as commander of the Bureau of Special Operations No. 2 in February 2024 following military setbacks in northern Shan State.

=== Operational context ===
BSO 2 oversees military operations in Shan and Kayah States. Starting in October 2023, the Three Brotherhood Alliance launched coordinated offensives, including Operation 1027, resulting in the capture of Lashio and disruption of the Lashio–Muse highway. Subsequently, BSO 2 reportedly restructured its command approach in response to these challenges.

=== 2026 ===
In May 2026, Naing Naing Oo was appointed commander of Bureau of Special Operations No. 3 (BSO-3), taking charge of both the Western and Southwestern Commands to coordinate military operations against the Arakan Army in Rakhine State and Ayeyarwady Region.
