= Battle of Kachinthay =

Battles of Kachinthay
- Part of the Myanmar civil war (2021–present) and Myanmar conflict
| Date | 25 November 2021 |
| Location | Kachithay, Shwegu Township, Kachin State, Myanmar 24.712117°N 97.488365°E |
| Result | Inconclusive |

Belligerents
| Kachin Independence Army; People's Defense Force | State Administration Council |

Strength
| Unknown | 100+ |

Casualties and losses
| Unknown | Unknown |

The Battle of Kachinthay (Burmese: ကချင်သေတိုက်ပွဲ) was a clash between a joint KIA-PDF force and the Myanmar military. Although the reason for the firefight is unknown, the military supposedly believed that the KIA was planning to infiltrate the Sagaing Region. During the battle, the Myanmar Army used artillery.
