= Battle of Budalin =

2024 battle in the Myanmar civil war

Coordinates: 22°27′06″N 95°07′18″E

- Part of the Myanmar civil war (2021–present)
Date	30 September 2024
Location	Budalin Township
Result	Resistance victory

Belligerents
State Administration Council: Tatmadaw	People's Defence Force; People's Liberation Army; Student Armed Force; Local anti-junta militias

Units involved
Tatmadaw: Myanmar Army; North Western Command; Ogre Column (alleged); Myanmar Police Force; Pyusawhti militias	People's Defence Force: Monywa District 20th Battalion; Budalin People's Defense Team; 96 Soldiers PDF; Student Armed Force People's Liberation Army Local Mobile Force Burma Liberation Democratic Front Yadanarbon Revolutionary Force Union Liberation Front

Strength
80–120	Unknown

Casualties and losses
20–50 killed, 42–50 captured	4 wounded

The Battle of Budalin was a confrontation between Myanmar Army troops and People's Defense Forces in Budalin Township which occurred on 30 September 2024.

== Background ==
On 20 September 2024, resistance forces attacked a junta base in Ku Taw village. A column of Myanmar Army troops was dispatched by the Northwestern Command to reinforce Ku Taw. On the way there, the column raided several villages, burned 19 houses, and killed both civilians and resistance forces. The casualties of these actions include an elderly man from Katoe village, a civilian from Kywe Thay Chaung, and two People's Defense Team members in Yatkyay village. During the 20 September battle in Ku Taw, two resistance fighters died and other were injured due to airstrikes by the Myanmar Air Force.

== Battle ==
On Monday, 30 September, the column of junta troops withdrew from Ku Taw to return to Budalin town. While on the way to Budalin, the column was surrounded and ambushed by resistance forces between the villages of Sipaw and Kywe Thay Chaung. Since the junta troops were out in the open while the resistance fighters fired from cover and concealment, they were overwhelmed despite air and artillery support and suffered many casualties before surrendering. Some of the junta troops were recently conscripted recruits, which contributed to the speed at which surrender was declared. Among the captured soldiers were two captains.

== Aftermath and importance ==
A spokesman for 96 Soldiers stated that “This is the first time a junta column was badly beaten in southern Anyar [central Myanmar]”.

The Myanmar Air Force began to conduct reprisal bombings in Budalin township on 2 October. Two people were killed after the bombings of a school, Buddhist religious building, and a clinic in Maung Htaung village. 10,000 people have become displaced and are fleeing their villages for fear of airstrikes. Many have gone into the woods or larger towns.

The bodies of killed Myanmar Army soldiers were buried on 2 October.

Later in the month of October, the troops of the Northwestern Command and allied militias would maraud through Budalin Township committing atrocities as retaliation for the defeat. The most shocking incident was the massacre in Si Par village on 17 October, which coincided with Thadingyut. Six villagers were killed by junta soldiers, dismembered, and their body parts hung on a fence as a display. The soldiers involved in the slaughter also burned down 300 homes. About 25 villagers were killed from the 10th-20th October and scores of others were arrested. 50,000 people fled Budalin during these events.
