= Saw Mutu Say Poe =

Karen military and political leader

Chairman of the Karen National Union
- In office 21 December 2012 – March 2023

Personal details
- Party: Karen National Union

Military service
- Allegiance: Kawthoolei
- Branch/service: Karen National Liberation Army
- Rank: General

Saw Mutu Say Poe is a Karen military and political leader. He is the chairman of the Karen National Union, first elected at the 15th KNU Congress on 21 December 2012 and reelected for another term on 10 April 2017. As a member of the Karen National Liberation Army, Poe maintained the rank of general officer and served as the commander in chief of the group prior to his election as chairman of the Karen National Union.

At the Union Peace Conference - 21st Century Panglong, Poe was a notable speaker who made the opening address and urged for more inclusive peace negotiations between the government of Myanmar and armed insurgent groups. Poe has also encouraged leaders of other insurgent groups to sign the Nationwide Ceasefire Agreement with the government.

Poe stepped down as KNU chairman on March 2023. On November 2025, the KNU formally expelled him for attending Tatmadaw-sponsored NCA events.
