= Demoso =

Demoso ဒီးမော့ဆိုမြို့
- Town
- Location in Myanmar
- Coordinates: 19.5383°N 97.1588°E
- Country: Myanmar
- State: Kayah
- District: Demoso District
- Township: Demoso Township

Area
  - Town: 0.98 sq mi (2.5 km^{2})
- Elevation: 2,982 ft (909 m)

Population (2019)
  - Urban: 5,522
  - Metro: 87,088
- Time zone: UTC+6.30 (MMT)

Demoso (Burmese: ဒီးမော့ဆိုမြို့; also spelled Dimawhso) is the capital of Demoso District in northwestern Kayah State, Myanmar.

== History ==
Demoso was the site of the Battle of Demoso during the Myanmar civil war that began in 2021. As a result of the conflict, many citizens in Demoso fled to neighboring areas, while numerous displaced people in Kayah State moved to the town, including Bishop Celso Ba Shwe of the Diocese of Loikaw in 2024.

On April 30, 2022, new districts were expanded and organized. Demoso became the capital of its own district, separating out of Loikaw District.

The town was taken by the Karenni Nationalities Defence Force following an offensive in November 2023. It was retaken by the Tatmadaw in August 2025.
