= Hpruso Township =

Coordinates: 19.0500°N 97.1333°E

Hpruso Township ဖရူဆိုမြို့နယ်
- Township
- Location in Demoso district (in red)
- Country: Myanmar
- State: Kayah State
- District: Demoso District
- Capital: Hpruso
- Time zone: UTC+6:30 (MMT)

Hpruso Township (Burmese: ဖရူဆိုမြို့နယ်) is a township of Demoso District in the western part of Kayah State in Myanmar. In 2022, it was moved out of Loikaw District to form part of the new Demoso District.

The principal town lies at Hpruso.
