= Hpruso =

Hpruso ဖရူဆိုမြို့
- Location in Myanmar
- Coordinates: 19°2′58″N 97°7′32″E
- Country: Myanmar
- State: Kayah State
- District: Loikaw District
- Township: Hpruso Township

Area
  - Total: 0.90 sq mi (2.33 km^{2})

Population (2020)
  - Total: 4,201
  - Density: 4,670/sq mi (1,800/km^{2})
- Time zone: UTC+6.30 (MST)

Hpruso (Burmese: ဖရူဆိုမြို့) is a town in the Kayah State of eastern part of Burma. It is the principal town of Hpruso Township and is divided into 5 wards.
