= Gangaw Township =

- Township
- Location in Gangaw district
- Coordinates: 22.1667°N 94.1167°E
- Country: Myanmar
- Division: Magway Division
- District: Gangaw District
- Capital: Gangaw
- Time zone: UTC+6:30 (MMT)

Gangaw Township is a township of Gangaw District in the Magway Division of Myanmar. The principal town is Gangaw. The capital city of Gangaw District is Pakokku.
