= Kawkareik Township =

Coordinates: 16.5500°N 98.2333°E

Kawkareik Township Burmese: ကော့ကရိတ်မြို့နယ် S'gaw Karen: ကီၢ်ကရံၣ်ကီၢ်ဆၣ် East Pwo Karen: ကေါဝ်တြာ်ဍုံကၞင့်
- Township
- Location in Karen State (in red)
- Country: Myanmar
- State: Karen State
- District: Kawkareik District
- Capital: Kawkareik

Area
  - Total: 932 sq mi (2,413 km^{2})
- Elevation: 55 ft (17 m)

Population (2019)
  - Total: 291,941
  - Density: 313.4/sq mi (121.0/km^{2})
  - Ethnicities: Karen; Mon; Bamar
  - Religions: Buddhism; Christianity
- Time zone: UTC+6:30 (MST)

Kawkareik Township (Pwo Eastern Karen: ကောဝ်တြာ်ကၞင့်; Burmese: ကော့ကရိတ်မြို့နယ်, Burmese pronunciation: [kɔ̰kəɹeɪʔ mjo̰nɛ̀]; S'gaw Karen: ကီၢ်ကရံၣ်ကီၢ်ဆၣ်) is the only township of Kawkareik District in the Karen State of Myanmar (Burma). The principal town is Kawkareik. Kawkareik township is the second most populated township in Karen State and there are many small villages inside. In 2022, the Ministry of Home Affairs split up Kawkareik District, leaving the township as the only township of the district.
