= Loikaw District =

Loikaw District လွိုင်ကော်‌ခရိုင်
- District of Kayah State
- location in Kayah State

- Location within Myanmar
- Coordinates: 19°40′27″N 97°12′34″E
- Country: Myanmar
- State: Kayah State
- Seat: Loikaw
- Time zone: UTC6:30 (MST)

Loikaw District (Burmese: လွိုင်ကော်‌ခရိုင်) is a district of the Kayah State in eastern part of Myanmar.

== Townships ==
Loikaw Township Shadaw Township

The district contains the following townships, cities and towns:

- Loikaw Township
  - Loikaw
  - Loilinlay
  - Lawpita
- Shadaw Township
  - Shadaw

In April 2022, Demoso Township and Hpruso Township were formed as Demoso District.
