= Myawaddy District =

District in Myanmar

Coordinates: 16°32′N 98°32′E

Myawaddy District (S'gaw Karen: ရါမတံၤကီၢ်ရ့ၣ်, Phlone:မေဝ်ပ္တီခြိုင့်,Burmese: မြဝတီခရိုင်) is a district of the Kayin State in Myanmar (Burma). It consists of a single township composed of 50 villages.

Location in Kayin state

== Townships ==
The district contains the following townships:

- Myawaddy Township
