= Demoso Township =

Coordinates: 19.538319°N 97.158813°E

Demoso Township ဒီမောဆိုး‌မြို့နယ်
- Township
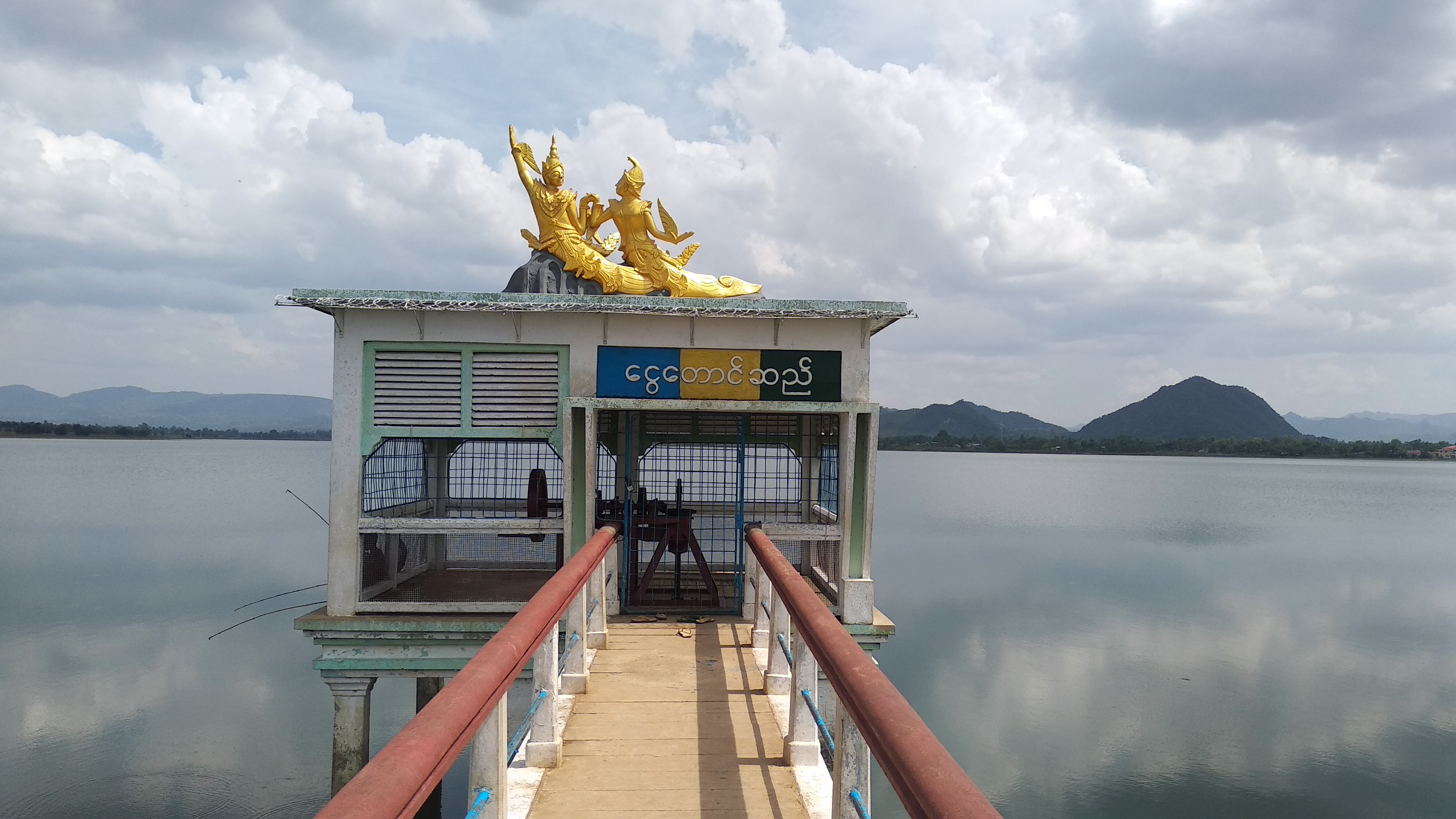
- Ngwe Taung Dam located within Demoso Township

- Location in Demoso district
- Country: Myanmar
- State: Kayah State
- District: Demoso District
- Capital: Demoso

Area
  - Total: 459.69 sq mi (1,190.6 km^{2})
- Elevation: 2,982 ft (909 m)

Population (2023)
  - Total: 92,077
  - Density: 200.30/sq mi (77.337/km^{2})
- Time zone: UTC+6:30 (MMT)

Demoso Township (Burmese: ဒီမောဆိုး‌မြို့နယ်) is a township in Demoso District in the western part of Kayah State in Myanmar. The township has two towns- the principal town of Demoso and the town of Nanmekhon, which combined comprise a total of five urban wards. The township also contains 173 villages grouped into 25 village tracts. In 2022, Demoso Township and its western neighbour Hpruso Township were made into their own district by the Ministry of Home Affairs.
