= National Highway 1 offensive =

2024 battle in Tanintharyi

- Part of the Myanmar civil war
Date	8 June 2024 – October 2024 (Note: No online sources refer to an end of NH1 offensive)
Location	National Highway 1, Tanintharyi Region (with spillover in Mon State), Myanmar
Result	Inconclusive: SAC recaptures several areas of NH1; Continued rebel activity along NH1

Belligerents
State Administration Council	Karen National Liberation Army People's Defence Force: Dawna Column; Tanintharyi PDF; Ye Air Force; Mon State Revolutionary Force All Burma Students' Democratic Front

Units involved
Tatmadaw: Myanmar Army; Light Infantry Battalion 406, 408, 409, 410	Karen National Liberation Army; Brigade 5, 6; People's Defence Force; Dawna Column’s Battalion 2

Casualties and losses
Tatmadaw unknown	People's Defence Force unknown

The National Highway 1 offensive was an offensive by the State Administration Council, aimed to recapture the National Highway 1 from resistance forces in June 2024 during the Myanmar civil war. Resistance forces had succeeded in capturing key sections of the road in March 2024, controlling more than 60% of the highway, installing checkpoints and ambushing Junta troops. The section targeted was formerly National Highway 8. The highway is vital for Junta operations in southern Myanmar, since it's the only road that links the Tanintharyi Region with the rest of the country. The Junta used ground troops together with airstrikes and bombs from its naval bases to hit the coalition of resistance forces, composed by NUG-affiliated groups like the Dawna Column and Tanintharyi PDF, independent post-coup groups like the Mon State Revolutionary Forces, older groups like the Karen National Union and All Burma Students’ Democratic Front, and even a drone team named the Ye Air Force.

== Background ==
National Highway 1 is the most important highway of southeastern Myanmar. It runs from Payagyi to Myeik, connecting Bago to Myeik. Thaton, it joins National Road 85. The highway then continues south and ends on the coast at Myeik.

== Offensive ==
On 7 June 2024 the Tatmadaw launches an offensive to recapture National Highway 1, the only paved road linking the Tanintharyi Region in southern Myanmar to the rest of the country. The regime used at least 600 troops in its attempt to retake the section of NH 8. Fierce clashes have broken out for control of the road, with Junta using its navy and air force to support its ground troops. Dawna Column's Battalion 2 stated that between June 7 and 11 the regime retook control of the villages of Thar Yar Mon and New Rar Hpu. In both cases, ground troops occupied the villages after they were bombarded with artillery from its naval base. Mon State Revolutionary Force (MSRF) stated that regime troops were forced to use water transport since resistance is in control of the road. Resistance forces said that the regime's military suffered casualties in clashes with resistance troops on the highway near Yarpuu Ywathit and Tharyar Mon villages in Tanintharyi's Yebyu Township on June 10 and 12.

The regime has reportedly sent reinforcements of Light Infantry Battalion 406 to Ma Hlwe Hill, which overlooks the highway on the border of Mon State and Tanintharyi. It has also sent reinforcements to Kalein Aung town by sea and tightened security there, residents say. Light Infantry Battalions 408, 409 and 410 are based in the town located in Tanintharyi's Yebyu township.

== Aftermath ==
After the offensive, it seems that the Junta succeed in recapturing some area of the township (Note: No online sources refers to an end of NH8 offensive), since on 14 October 2024 Junta troops raided Kye village, Pulaw Township; a PDF member said that around 300 junta troops are using National Highway 1 and waterways to raid villages in the township. More than 3,000 residents from at least seven villages have been displaced by the fighting.

== See also ==
- Karen National Union
- Ramanya Joint Column
- National Highway 1 (Myanmar)
- Tanintharyi Region)
