= Roads in Myanmar =

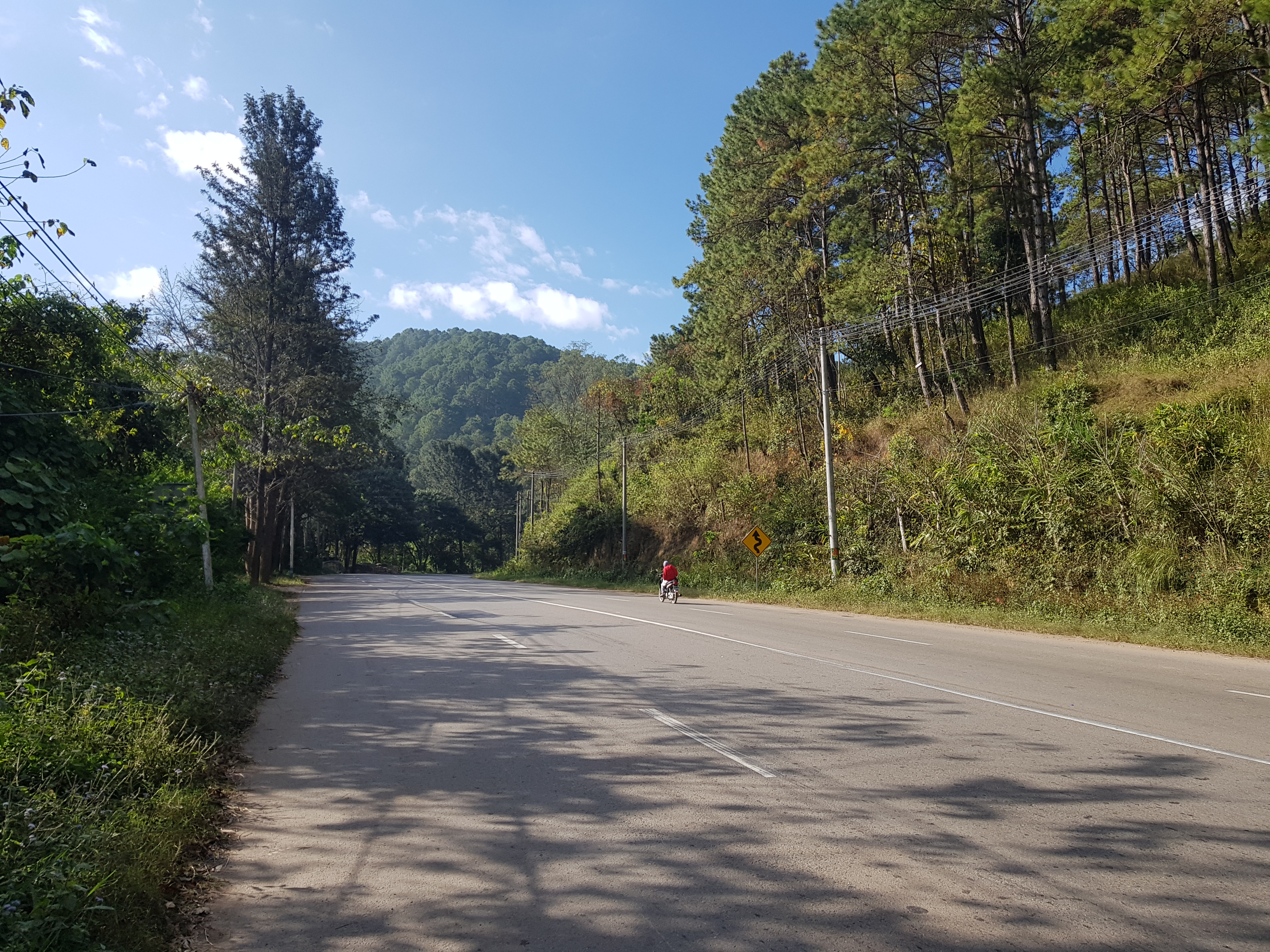
AH2 in Kalaw

Myanmar's road network consists of five types of roads:

- Expressways (အမြန်လမ်းမကြီး)
- National Highways (ပြည်ထောင်စုလမ်းမကြီး), also known as Union Highways
- Main Arterials (အဓိကလမ်းမကြီး)
- Sub Arterials (လမ်းခွဲငယ်)
- Asian (ASEAN) Highways

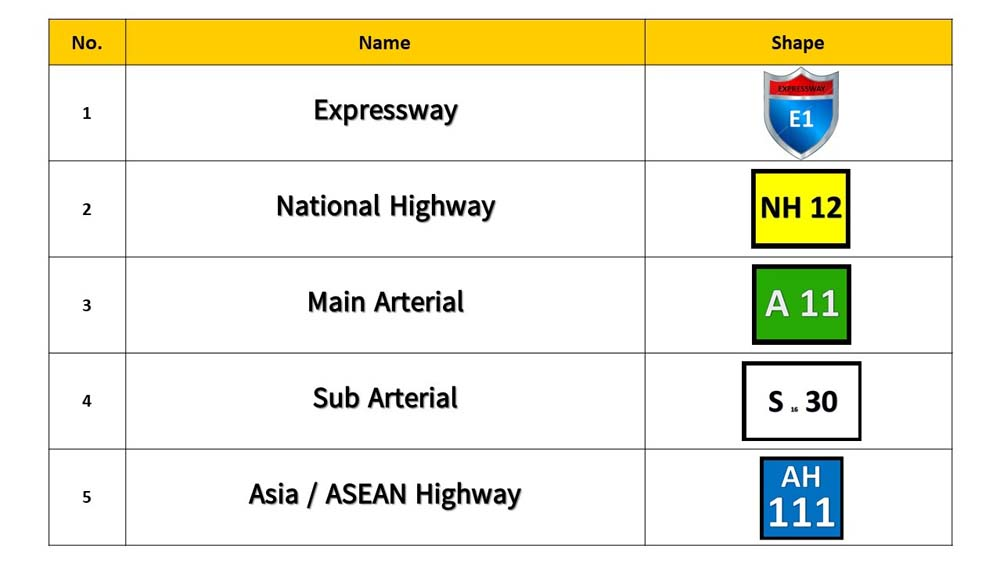
Road Numbering Signs of Myanmar

== Expressways ==
Myanmar's expressway network is undergoing gradual modernization, with the Yangon-Mandalay Expressway (E 1) serving as its backbone. Completed in 2010, the E 1 is a 590-kilometer, four-lane highway linking the country's largest city Yangon with the central hub Mandalay via Naypyidaw, the capital. Myanmar has outlined plans for five additional expressways.

Expressways
No.	Route	Length (km)	Status
E 1	Yangon - Naypyidaw - Mandalay	589.62	Active
E 2	Mandalay - Myitkyina	460	Planned
E 3	Pathein - Monywa - Shwebo	811	Planned
E 4	Minbu - Ann - Kyaukphyu	350	Planned
E 5	Yangon - Pathein - Ngayokaung	304	Planned
E 6	Thilawa - Thanatpin - Kyaikto	135	Planned

== National Highways ==
In 2021, the Ministry of Construction published a list of 50 national highways. This numbering system is designed as a grid, with numbers increasing from south to north. There is no clear system within this grid, but the numbers are somewhat zoned. However, certain numbers do not run east-west or north-south. Some routes do not actually exist as drivable road connections.

National Highways in Myanmar

No.	Route	Length (km)
NH 1	Payagyi - Thaton - Mawlamyine - Dawei - Myeik - Tanintharyi - Bokepyin - Kawthaung	1193.03
NH 2	Htone Khar - Thea Hpyu - Maw Daung (border Thailand)	77.65
NH 3	Dawei (SEZ) - Myit Tar - Htee Khee (Phu Nam Ron)(border Thailand)	156.11
NH 4	Thanbyuzayat - Payathonzu (border Thailand)	101.79
NH 5	Pathein - Einme - Wakema - Mawlamyinegyun - Bogale - Pyapon - Dedaye - Yangon (Kungyangon)	279.08
NH 6	Thaton - Hpa-An - Kawkareik - Myawaddy (border Thailand)	178.44
NH 7	Pathein - Chaungtha - Gwa	158.33
NH 8	Yangon - Pathein	182.25
NH 9	Ngathaingchaung (Yae Nant Thar) - Gwa - Thandwe - Toungup	279.42
NH 10	Pathein - Monywa	670.69
NH 11	Yangon - Pyay - Magway - Kyaukpadaung - Myingyan - Myittha - Mandalay	768.06
NH 12	Yangon - Taungoo - Meiktila - Mandalay	631.66
NH 13	Pyay - Pandaung - Toungup - Ma-Ei - Kyaukpyu	354.45
NH 14	Pyay - Paukkhaung - Taungoo (Oktwin)	201.37
NH 15	Taungoo - Mawchi - Bawlakhe - Demoso	279.13
NH 16	Bawlakhe - Ywarthit - Sut Pai - BP 10 (border Thailand)	83.18
NH 17	Loikaw - Pun Chaung - Shadaw - Tar Ta Mawt	79.70
NH 18	Minbu - Ann - Sittwe	486.83
NH 19	Naypyidaw - Kanpyar - Magway	159.33
NH 20	Pyinmana (Kin Thar) - Pinlaung - Loikaw	182.66
NH 21	Taungoo - Leiktho - Yar Dow - Loikaw - Hopong	349.17
NH 22	BP 1 (Thailand border) - Mongton - Mongpan - Kunhing - Mong Nawng - Kyethi - Mongyai - Lashio (Muse)	631.42
NH 23	Nansang - Mongnai - Mongton - Mong Hsat - Mongkhoke - Monghpyak	451.12
NH 24	Sittwe - Ponnagyun - Rathedaung - Buthidaung - Maungdaw - Kyein Chaung - Taungpyoletwea (Bangladesh Border)	207.001
NH 25	Kyauktaw - Paletwa - Set Pyit Pyin - Myeik Wa (Zorinpui)(Indian Border)	163.35
NH 26	Meiktila - Kyaukpadaung - Nyaung-U - Myingyan	214.65
NH 27	Meiktila - Taunggyi - Kengtung - Tachileik (Thailand Border)	790.19
NH 28	Tachileik - Kengtung - Mong Khet - Mong Pawk - Panghsang - Mongmao - Hopang - Chinshwehaw (China border)	724.61
NH 29	Tarlay - Mong Pa Hlyo - Kenglat (Laos border)	56.33
NH 30	Pakokku - Pauk - Kyaukhtu - Mindat - Matupi	321.67
NH 31	Shwenyaung - Lawksawk - Intaw - Kyauk Gu - Nawnghkio	231.64
NH 32	Loilem - Pang Kay Tu - Hsipaw (Hko Lan)	240.19
NH 33	Kengtung - Mong Ma -Mong La (China border)	87.51
NH 34	Hakha - Matupi - Paletwa	492.26
NH 35	Monywa - Pale - Gangaw - Hakha	315.03
NH 36	Mandalay - Sagaing - Monywa - Ye-U	204.58
NH 37	Mandalay - Lashio - Muse - Namkham - Bhamo - Lweje (China Border)	673.31
NH 38	Sagaing (Ohn Taw) - Shwebo	68.8
NH 39	Hakha - Thantlang - Sa Si Chuak / Saisihchuak (India border)	103.4
NH 40	Kalay - Taingen - Falam - Hakha	199.56
NH 41	Gangaw - Kalay - Kyi Kone	143.43
NH 42	Monywa - Yar Gyi - Kalewa	186.08
NH 43	Mandalay - Tagaung - Bhamo - Myitkyina	294.11
NH 44	Hsenwi - Kunlong - Chinshwehaw (China border)	106.22
NH 45	Taingen - Tedim - Tonzang - Cikha (Indian Border)	182.46
NH 46	Shwebo - Ye-U - Kalewa - Kyi Kone - Tamu (India Border)	358.98
NH 47	Shwebo - Myitkyina	483.81
NH 48	Thet Kei Kyin - Paungbyin - Homalin - Hkamti - Sin Thay - Lahe - Dohi - Nanyun	793.61
NH 49	Kanpaikti (China border) - Waingmaw - Myitkyina - Tanai - Pansau (India border)	499.10
NH 50	Myitkyina - Sumprabum - Putao - Nogmung	467.92

=== Old Numbering System ===
In the past, there was a different system where single-digit roads formed the main routes, with the 1 and 2 between Yangon and Mandalay, with other single-digit roads branching off from them, and the two-digit roads branching off from the single-digit roads. This created a zoned system with three-digit numbers as well.

The main highways are as follows:

- 1 – Runs from Yangon to Mandalay, passing through Bago, Taungoo, Pyinmana and Meiktila.
- 2 – Runs from Yangon to Mandalay, passing through Pyay, Magwe, Kyaukpadaung and Myingyan.
- 3 – Runs from Mandalay to Muse, on the border with China, passing through Lashio.
- 4 – Runs from Meiktila to Tachileik, on the border with Thailand, passing through Taunggyi and Kengtung.
- 5 – Runs from Taungoo to Hopong, passing through Loikaw.
- 6 – Runs from Yangon to Pathein.
- 7 – Runs from Mandalay to Moreh, on the border with India, passing through Shwebo and Kale.
- 8 – Runs from Payagyi to Myeik, passing through Moulmein, Ye and Dawei.
- 17– Runs from Tada-U to Myingyan, passing through Gway Kone, and Myo Thar.
- 31 – Runs from Mandalay to Myitkyina, passing through Mogok and Bhamo.

== Main Arterials ==
Main arterials are designated with one to two digits numbers. The arterials are numbered according to their direction: north-south roads are assigned odd numbers, increasing from west to east; east-west roads are assigned even numbers, increasing from south to north.

Main Arterials
No.	Route	Length (km)
A 1	Pathein - Shwe Myin Tin-Chaungtha - Gwa - Kyeintali - Thandwe - Taungup - Ma-Ei - Ann - Na Yan Junction - Minbya - Pauktaw - Rathedaung - Buthidaung - Maungdaw - Kyein Chaung - Baw Tu Lar (Bangladesh Border)	889.301
A 2	Tanintharyi - Hton Kha - Thea Hpyu - Maw Daung (border Thailand)	77.651
A 3	Labutta - Myaungmya - Einme - Kyaunggon - Kan Ka Lay - Yae Nant Thar - Kwin Kauk - Bwet Yoe - Oakshitpin - Pa Dan - Kan Pyar - Ka Zun Ma -Saw - Kyaukhtu - Htilin - Gangaw - Han Thar Wa Di - Kalay - Kyi Kone - Tamu (Border of India)	1071.226
A 4	Dawei - Pa Kar Ri - Myit Tar - Sin Hpyu Taing - Htee Khee (Phu Nam Ron)(border Thailand)	140.818
A 5	Yangon - Hmawbi - Taikkyi - Thayarwady - Min Hla - Pyay - Kamma - Thayet - Minhla - Minbu - Magway - Yenangyaung - Kyaukpadaung - Nyaung-U - Let Pan Chi Paw -Pakokku- Myaing - Lin Ka Taw - Kyar Tet - Salingyi - Monywa - Ye-U - Taze - Kanbalu - Kyunhla - Kawlin - Win Gyi - Wuntho - Nant Thea - Nam See Awng - Namti	1328.827
A 6	Thanbyuzayat - Chaungzon - Payathonzu	101.791
A 7	Yangon - Bago - Taungoo - Pyinmana - Pyawbwe -Meiktila - Kyaukse - Mandalay - Madaya - Let Pan Hla - Hpawt Taw - Twin Nge - Tagaung - Mya Taung - Ngar Oe - Thar Yar Kone - Shwegu - Nga Bat Gyi - Man Wein Lay - Sa Wan Ka Htaung - Bhamo - Waingmaw - Myitkyina - Sumprabum - Putao	1597.933
A 8	Ngayokekaung - Ngayokekaung Taung - Oke Shit Kwin - Nga Pu Taw - Pammawaddy - Myaungmya - Wakema - Mawlamyinegyun - Baik Lay - Pyapon - Dedaye - Kungyangon - Kawmhu - Kan Beit - Dala - Thanlyin - Thongwa - Thanatpin - Bilin	583.847
A 9	Kawthaung - Bokepyin - Tanintharyi - Kyauk Hpyu Taung (Myeik) - Ye - Thanbyuzayat - Mudon - Mawlamyine - Thaton - Bilin - Papun - Khe Ma Hpyu - Hpasawng - Bawlakhe - Loikaw - Hopong - Loilem - Pang Kay Tu - Hko Long - Mae Han - Lashio - Theinni - Kutkai - Nam Hpat Kar - Muse (Border of China)	2206.258
A 10	Pathein - Kan Ka Lay - Kyaung Kone - Pantanaw - Sar Ma Lauk - Htan Ta Pin - Hmawbi - Htauk Kyant - Za Yat Kwin - Bago - Sit Taung - Bilin - Thaton - Hpa-An - Naung Lon - Gyaing - Kyondoe -Hlaing Kwei - Myawaddy (Border of Thailand)	597.668
A 11	Tachileik/Keng Lat - Tarlay - Mong Hpyak - Kengtung - Mongkhet - Mong Nang - Mong Pawk - Nawng Hkat - Mongmao - Man Mein Hon - Nam Hu (Border of China)	679.143
A 12	Toungup - Pandaung - Pyay - Paukkaung - Oktwin - Taungoo - Thandaung - Mawchi - Hpasawng - Mese - BP-13 (Border of Thailand)	640.601
A 14	Kyaukphyu - Ma-Ei - Ann - Pa Dan - Minbu - Magway - Taungdwingyi - Chaung Net - Taung Nyo - Pyinmana - Pinlaung - Pekon - Loikaw	725.614
A 16	Sittwe - Ponnagyun - Kyauktaw - Paletwa - Matupi - Mindat - Kanpetlet - Ka Zun Ma - Chauk - Gway Cho - Kyaukpadaung - Meiktila - Thazi - Hpa Yar Ngar Su - Kalaw - Taunggyi - Hopong - Loilem - Nansang - Kholam - Tar Kaw - Mong Ping - Kengtung - Mong Ma - Mong La (Border of China)	1512.883
A 18	Hakha - Gangaw - Pale - Monywa - Myinmu - Ohn Taw - Sagaing - Myitnge - Htone Bo - Pyin Oo Lwin - Kyaukme - Hsipaw - Lashio - Theinni - Kunlong - Nam Hu - Chinshwehaw (Border of China)	873.704
A 20	Kalay - Kyi Kone- Kalewa - Thet Kei Kyin - Taze - Ye-U - Shwebo - Kyaukmyaung - Singu- Let Pan Hla- Hpawt Taw - Thabeikkyin - Twin Nge - Momeik - Mantong - Mong Wee - Namhkam - Muse (Border of China)	695.942
A 22	Tamu (Border of India) - Sit Thaung - Yawng Hee - Pinlebu - Win Gyi - Wuntho - Kyauk Tan - Sin Kone - Ma Ra Thein - Htigyaing - Mya Taung - Ngar Oe - Thar Yar Kone - Kyay Taw - Nga Bat Gyi - Hsin Hkan - Han Htet - Man Wein Lay - Sa Wan Ka Htaung - Mansi - Kaik Hteik - Man Wean Gyi - Namhkam	622.506
A 24	Pansau (India border) - Nanyun - Shingbwiyang - Tanai - Lawa - Namti - Myitkyina - Waingmaw - Sa Done - Kanpaikti (China border)	491.196

== Sub Arterials ==
Sub arterials road numbers consist of two parts: the first part is the region/state code and the second part is the road code. The road number are numbered according to their direction: north-south roads are assigned odd numbers, increasing from west to east; east-west roads are assigned even numbers, increasing from south to north. Roads numbered 1 to 99 are within the same region/state, and roads numbered 201 to 299 are connecting two regions/states.

Region/State Codes
Region/State	Code	Region/State	Code	Region/State	Code
Kachin State	1	Bago Region	7	Eastern Shan State	13
Kayah State	2	Magway Region	8	Southern Shan State	14
Kayin State	3	Mandalay Region	9	Northern Shan State	15
Chin State	4	Mon State	10	Ayeyarwady Region	16
Sagaing Region	5	Rakhine State	11	Naypyidaw Union Territory	17
Tanintharyi Region	6	Yangon Region	12		

== Asian Highways ==
There are seven Asian Highway routes within Myanmar, three of which are also ASEAN highways.

Asian (ASEAN) Highways
No.	Route	Length (km)	Network
AH1	Payagyi - Thaton - Myawaddy(border of Thailand); Yangon - Payagyi - Taungoo - Meiktila - Mandalay - Monywa - Kalewa - Kaley - Tamu (border of India)	1542.706	Asian Highway
AH2	Meiktila - Loilen - Kengtung - Tachileik (border of Thailand)	790.084	Asian Highway
AH3	Kengtung - Mong La (border of China)	87.508	Asian Highway
AH14	Mandalay - Hsipaw - Muse (border of China)	446.370	Asian Highway
AH111	Loilen - Hsipaw	240.193	ASEAN Highway
AH112	Thaton - Mawlamyine - Dawei - Kawthaung	1111.963	ASEAN Highway
AH123	Dawei - Phu Nam Ron (border of Thailand)	140.817	ASEAN Highway

== Rural ==
Myanmar faces severe rural accessibility challenges, with around two-thirds of its rural population physically isolated for part or all of the year. The country has about 64,000 villages but only 75,000 km of all-season roads—roughly one kilometer per village, far below what is needed for universal access. An estimated 20 million people, or 40% of the population, live in villages without all-season road access. Of these, 9.2 million people in 25,000 villages lack any road connection at all, while another 11.3 million in 20,000 villages are linked only by roads that become impassable during the rainy season.

Using the Rural Access Index (RAI), which measures the share of the rural population living within 2 km of an all-season road, Myanmar scores only 36%, the second lowest in Asia after Afghanistan. This means 64% of rural residents—about 24 million people—must travel more than 2 km to reach an all-season road. Access varies widely across regions: Mon State has relatively high access (73%), while Chin State (11%), Kachin State, Kayin State, and Rakhine State (15–18%) face extremely poor connectivity, comparable only to some of the least connected countries in Africa.

== See also ==
- Transport in Myanmar
- Road signs in Myanmar
