= Mon State Federal Council =

2021 provisional Myanmar government

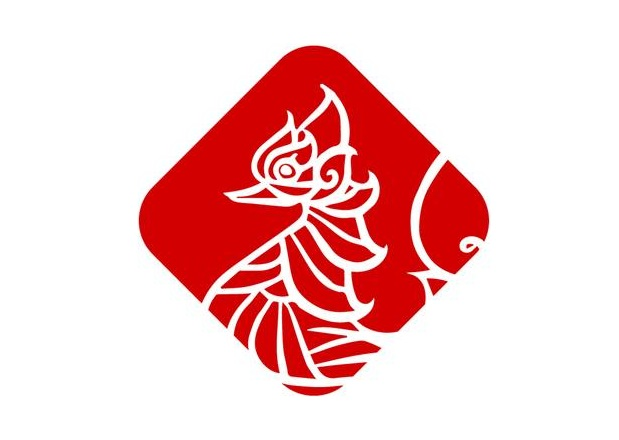
- MSFC Logo
- Leader: Nai Thuwunna
- Dates active: 2021-present
- Active regions: Mon State; Kayin State
- Ideology: Mon nationalism Federalism

The Mon State Federal Council is an interim government established in Mon State following the 2021 Myanmar coup d'état. It is one of the two major Mon revolutionary groups active in Myanmar, the other being the New Mon State Party (Anti-Military Dictatorship). The MSFC commands 2 military forces, the Mon State Revolutionary Force and the Mon State Defense Force. It is also a member of the National Unity Consultative Council.

== History ==
The MSFC was established as the Mon State Interim Coordination Committee (MSICC) on 19 April 2021 as an umbrella organisation for Mon pro-democracy political parties, lawmakers, and civil organisations. On 15 January 2023, the MSICC reformed as the MSFC after its first conference to better represent and strengthen its federalist cause. In April 2024, the Mon State Defense Force agreed to join the Mon State Revolutionary Force under the MSFC. Shortly after, the MSFC and NMSP-AD pledged to begin collaborating.

On 20 January 2025, the NMSP-AD, the MLA, MSDF, and MSRF agreed to contribute soldiers into a joint force: the Ramanya Joint Column. The column was disbanded in June 2025 due to complications with the NMSP-AD and MLA merging into the Ramonnya Mon Army, but discussions were held to reassess its command structure.

The MSDF faced an internal split in July 2025 after its political chairman, Dr. Thirimon Chan, was dismissed from duties due to mutiny. In retaliation, Chan established the Mon State Defense Force - Central on 15 July, with himself as commander-in-chief. The MSDF established an inquiry committee to investigate the issue.

The MSFC has experienced tensions with other Mon organisations, including the Mon State Consultative Council and the NMSP-AD, over issues regarding unification.
