= Kyauk Mi =

Myauk Mi သဵၼ်ႈဝီ
- Location in Burma
- Coordinates: 21°54′56″N 96°9′56″E
- Country: Burma
- Division: Mandalay Division

Population (2005)
  - Religions: Buddhism
- Time zone: UTC+6.30 (MST)

Kyauk Mi is a town in Mandalay Division, Burma situated 15.2 km East of Mandalay. The town is first settlement on National Highway 3 after Mandalay.
