= Ongyaw =

Ongyaw အုန်းချော Ohn Chaw
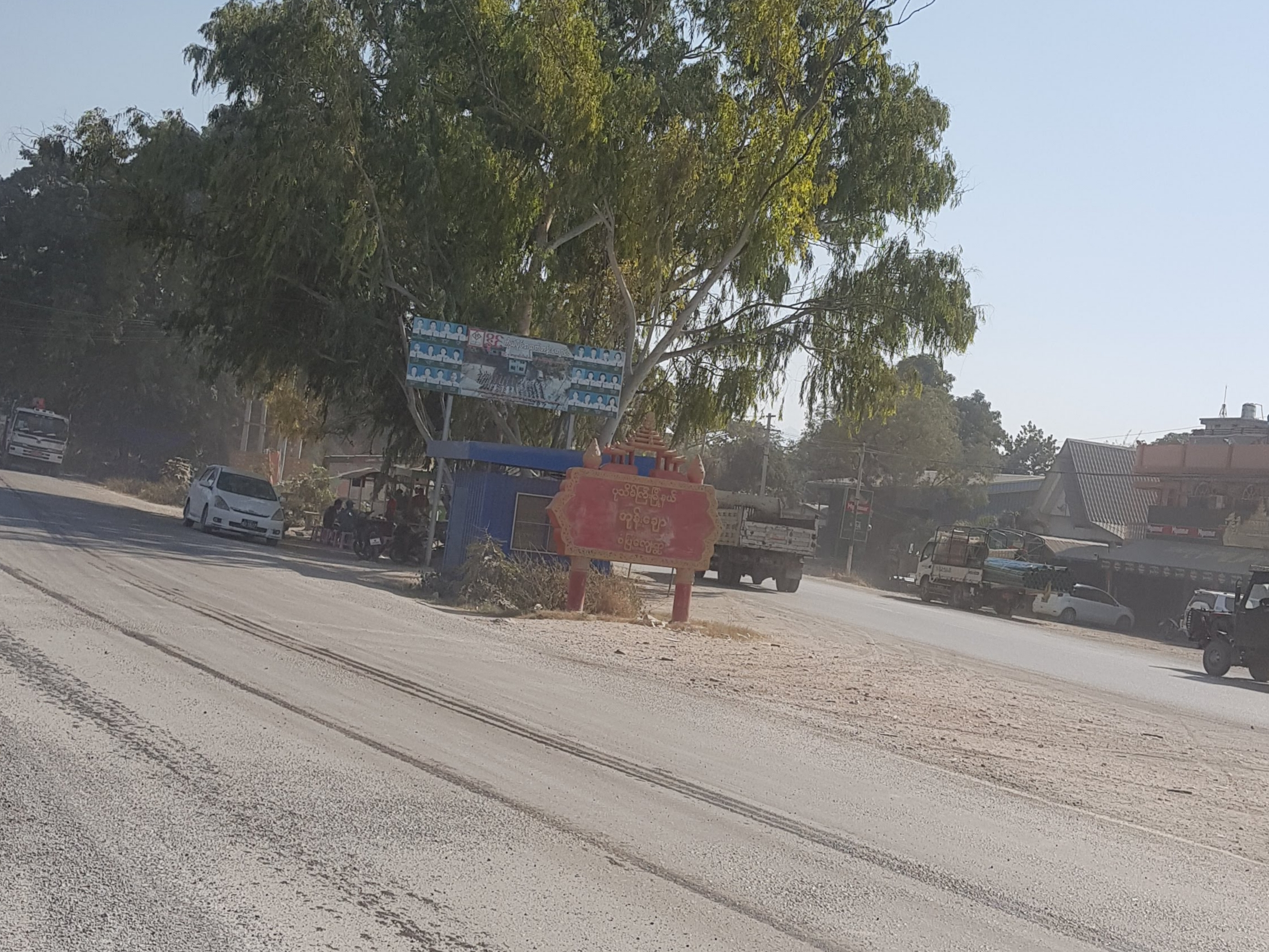

- Location in Myanmar
- Coordinates: 21°52′47″N 96°12′0″E
- Country: Myanmar
- Region: Mandalay

Population (2005)
  - Religions: Buddhism
- Time zone: UTC+6.30 (MST)

Ongyaw (also known as Ohn Chaw) is a village in Patheingyi Township, Mandalay District, Mandalay Division, Myanmar situated 24.7 kilometres (15.3 mi) south-east of Mandalay. The village is the third settlement on National Highway 3 after Mandalay.
