= General Strike Committee of Nationalities =

Multi-nationalities strike organization in Myanmar

- General Strike Committee of Nationalities (2021-Aug 2024); Generations' Solidarity Coalition of Nationalities (Aug 2024-present) လူမျိုးပေါင်းစုံအထွေထွေသပိတ်ကော်မတီ (2021-Aug 2024) လူမျိုးပေါင်းစုံမျိုးဆက်များသွေးစည်းညီညွတ်သောမဟာမိတ်အင်အားစု (Aug 2024-present)
- Logo of General Strike Committee of Nationalities
- Abbreviation: GSCN
- Established: February 11, 2021; 5 years ago
- Purpose: To build a federal democratic union in Myanmar, To end military dictatorship
- Affiliations: General Strike Committee; National Unity Government; National Unity Consultative Council

The General Strike Committee of Nationalities (Burmese: လူမျိုးပေါင်းစုံအထွေထွေသပိတ်ကော်မတီ; GSCN) is a multi-nationalities strike organization formed on February 11, 2021, during the Spring Revolution. It is a coalition of 31 ethnic groups united by a common political goal: to end military dictatorship and establish a federal democratic union. The GSCN has been actively involved in the struggle and is a leading voice of Myanmar's Civil Disobedience Movement. It is also a member of the National Unity Consultative Council, the advisory body of the National Unity Government of Myanmar.

The General Strike Committee of Nationalities, alongside the General Strike Committee (GSC), is one of the most influential domestic organizations in Myanmar’s ongoing conflict. The General Strike Committee of Nationalities was reformed and renamed as the Generations' Solidarity Coalition of Nationalities on August 14, 2024.

== History ==
The General Strike Committee of Nationalities was formed on February 11, 2021, shortly after the military coup in Myanmar. Since its inception, it has played a significant role in organizing and coordinating nationwide protests.

In the early stages of the Spring Revolution, numerous strike groups used different slogans and messages. Over time, the GSCN, in coordination with other strike committees, worked to unify these efforts by developing shared slogans and themes. This collaboration led to the widespread adoption of slogans such as "Who are we? We are the people of Yangon" and "The mountains and land are now united," symbolizing solidarity between ethnic minorities and the Bamar majority. The GSCN's primary goals include establishing a federal democratic union, abolishing the 2008 constitution, demanding the unconditional release of all individuals detained arbitrarily, and opposing the military's planned elections.

Despite tensions with the CRPH, the General Strike Committee of Nationalities has remained one of the most visible, impactful, and innovative ethnic-based contributors to the pro-democracy movement, in contrast to some ethnic parties that cooperated with the military's SAC or offered only limited support.

During its second conference on 14 August 2024, the General Strike Committee of Nationalities officially changed its name to the Generations' Solidarity Coalition of Nationalities, following a consensus decision by the Central Executive Committee.

== Federal FM ==
Federal FM is a media organization that originated during Myanmar's Spring Revolution as a sister group to the General Strike Committee of Nationalities (GSCN). Based in Karenni State, the organization employs over two dozen members and broadcasts via FM radio, television, and digital media. Federal FM has two offices: one in Chiang Mai and the other inside Karenni State.

== See also ==
- 2021 Myanmar coup d'etat
- National Unity Government
- State Administration Council
