= National Unity Consultative Council =

Governmental body in Myanmar

- အမျိုးသားညီညွတ်ရေးအတိုင်ပင်ခံကောင်စီ
- Abbreviation: NUCC
- Established: March 8, 2021; 5 years ago
- Founders: Committee Representing Pyidaungsu Hluttaw (CRPH), ethnic armed organizations (EAOs), federal-unit and nationalities-based consultative councils
- Purpose: To build a federal democratic union in Myanmar
- Affiliations: National Unity Government
- Website: nucc-federal.org

The National Unity Consultative Council (Burmese: အမျိုးသားညီညွတ်ရေးအတိုင်ပင်ခံကောင်စီ; NUCC) is an advisory body of the National Unity Government of Myanmar. Formed in response to the 2021 Myanmar coup d'etat, the NUCC seeks to overthrow the military dictatorship and build a federal democratic union in Myanmar through collective leadership, political dialogue, and coordination. NUCC is a historic alliance of ethnic armed organizations and the Bamar majority, and is considered one of the most inclusive in modern Burmese history.

== History ==
28 political institutions, including the Committee Representing Pyidaungsu Hluttaw (CRPH), Ethnic Armed Organizations (EAOs), federal-unit and nationalities-based consultative councils formed the NUCC on 8 March 2021. NUCC published a two-part Federal Democratic Charter on 31 March 2021 as a precursor to replace the military-drafted 2008 Constitution of Myanmar, which was abolished by CRPH that same day. On 16 April 2021, it formed the National Unity Government (NUG).

In May and September 2022, the government of Malaysia, an ASEAN member-state, called for ASEAN to formally engage with NUCC and NUG in the face of intransigence from Myanmar's ruling military junta. In December 2022, the American government passed the BURMA Act, which explicitly expresses the government's support of and authorises assistance to NUCC, NUG, and other pro-democracy advocates aiming to restore civilian rule. In response, the military junta issued a statement dubbing the law an interference in Myanmar's internal affairs, and encroachment of the country's sovereignty.

On 28 June 2026, the NUCC met with representatives of the Communist Party of Burma and the Spring Revolution Alliance to address internal disputes among the People's Defence Force and allied armed groups.

== Representatives ==
NUCC representatives include the Committee Representing Pyidaungsu Hluttaw (CRPH), a legislative body representing deposed lawmakers elected by the 2020 Myanmar general election, eight ethnic armed organizations, including the Karen National Union (KNU), the Karenni National Progressive Party (KNPP), and the Chin National Front (CNF), and five ethnic-based consultative councils representing the Kachin, Chin, Karenni, Mon, and Palaung peoples. Ethnic-based political parties, civil society organizations and civil disobedience groups were also founding members.

== Members ==
	Organizations	Abbreviation	Type
1	Committee Representing Pyidaungsu Hluttaw	CRPH	Elected members of parliament
2	Members of Parliament Union	MPU	Elected members of parliament
3	Democratic Party for a New Society	DPNS	Political party
4	Anti-coup Forces Coordination Committee – Mandalay	AFCC	Civil society organizations, including unions, women, youths and minorities concerned groups, CDM organizations against dictatorship, and mass movement strike organizations
5	Critical Movement	CM	Civil society organizations, including unions, women, youths and minorities concerned groups, CDM organizations against dictatorship, and mass movement strike organizations
6	Myanmar Labour Alliance	LA	Civil society organizations, including unions, women, youths and minorities concerned groups, CDM organizations against dictatorship, and mass movement strike organizations
7	General Strike Coordination Body	GSCB	Civil society organizations, including unions, women, youths and minorities concerned groups, CDM organizations against dictatorship, and mass movement strike organizations
8	General Strike Committee (Basic and Higher Education)	GSCBHE	Civil society organizations, including unions, women, youths and minorities concerned groups, CDM organizations against dictatorship, and mass movement strike organizations
9	General Strike Committee	GSC	Civil society organizations, including unions, women, youths and minorities concerned groups, CDM organizations against dictatorship, and mass movement strike organizations
10	General Strike Collaboration Committee	GSCC	Civil society organizations, including unions, women, youths and minorities concerned groups, CDM organizations against dictatorship, and mass movement strike organizations
11	General Strike Committee of Nationalities	GSCN	Civil society organizations, including unions, women, youths and minorities concerned groups, CDM organizations against dictatorship, and mass movement strike organizations
12	88 Generation Peace and Open Society	88	Civil society organizations, including unions, women, youths and minorities concerned groups, CDM organizations against dictatorship, and mass movement strike organizations
13	Myanmar Teachers Federation	MTF	Civil society organizations, including unions, women, youths and minorities concerned groups, CDM organizations against dictatorship, and mass movement strike organizations
14	Technological Teachers Federation	TTF	Civil society organizations, including unions, women, youths and minorities concerned groups, CDM organizations against dictatorship, and mass movement strike organizations
15	Women's League of Burma	WLB	Civil society organizations, including unions, women, youths and minorities concerned groups, CDM organizations against dictatorship, and mass movement strike organizations
16	Monywa People's Strike Steering Committee	MPSSC	Civil society organizations, including unions, women, youths and minorities concerned groups, CDM organizations against dictatorship, and mass movement strike organizations
17	Synergy Social Harmony Organization	SSHO	Civil society organizations, including unions, women, youths and minorities concerned groups, CDM organizations against dictatorship, and mass movement strike organizations
18	Women's Peace Network	WPN	Civil society organizations, including unions, women, youths and minorities concerned groups, CDM organizations against dictatorship, and mass movement strike organizations
19	Women Advocacy Coalition – Myanmar	WAC-M	Civil society organizations, including unions, women, youths and minorities concerned groups, CDM organizations against dictatorship, and mass movement strike organizations
20	Karenni National Progressive Party	KNPP	Ethnic resistance organizations
21	Karen National Union	KNU	Ethnic resistance organizations
22	All Burma Students' Democratic Front	ABSDF	Ethnic resistance organizations
23	Interim Chin National Consultative Council	ICNCC	Interim State, Federal, Ethnic Representative Committees
24	Mon State Federal Council	MSFC	Interim State, Federal, Ethnic Representative Committees
25	Karenni State Consultative Council	KSCC	Interim State, Federal, Ethnic Representative Committees
26	Pa-O National Federal Council	PNFC	Interim State, Federal, Ethnic Representative Committees
27	Ta'ang Political Consultative Council	TPCC	Interim State, Federal, Ethnic Representative Committees

== See also ==
- 2021 Myanmar coup d'etat
- National Unity Government
- State Administration Council
- Steering Council for the Emergence of a Federal Democratic Union
