= Bago Township =

Bago Township ပဲခူးမြို့နယ်
- Township
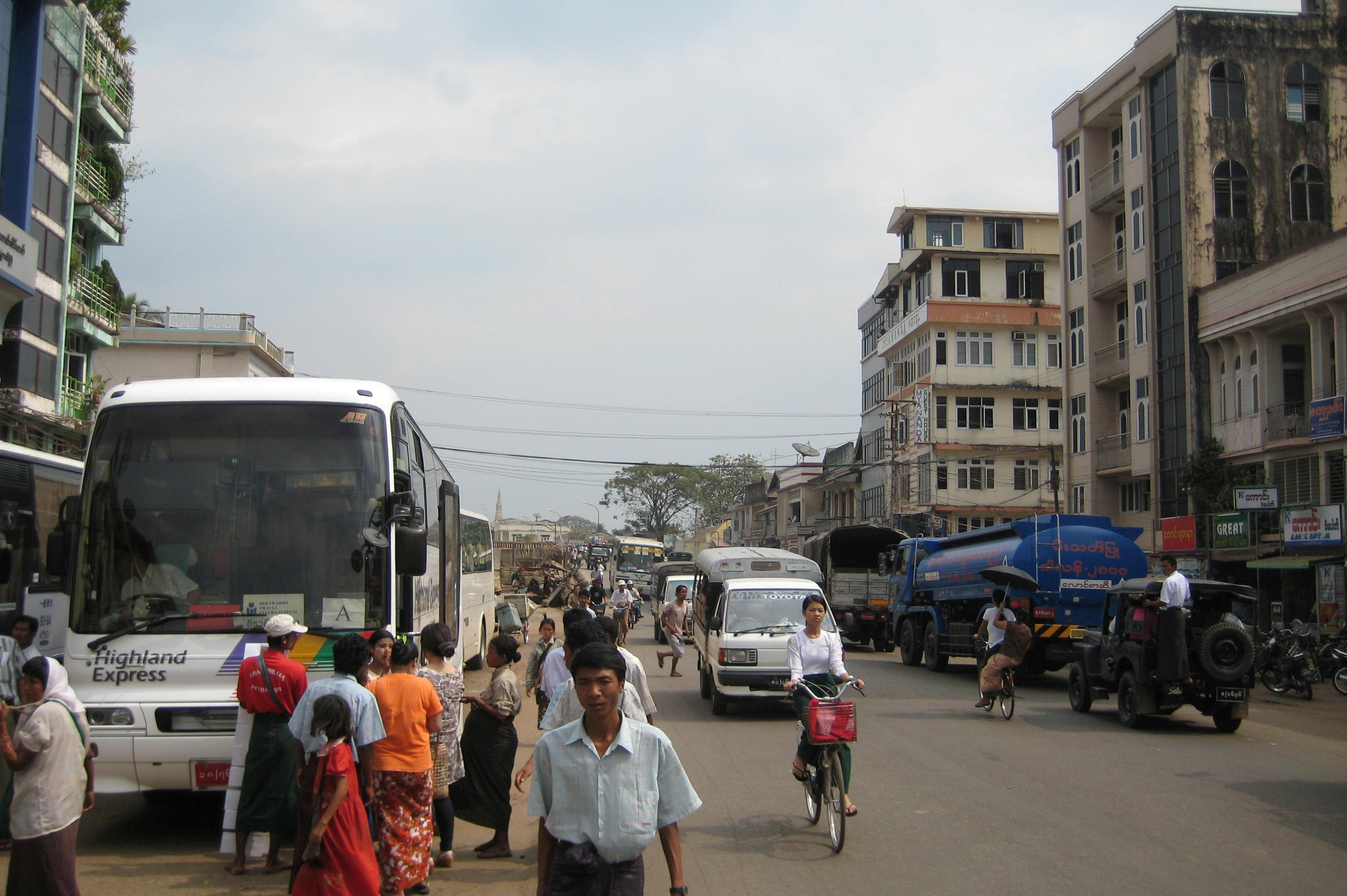
- A Street in Bago

- Location in Bago district
- Coordinates: 17°19′N 96°27′E
- Country: Myanmar
- Region: Bago Region
- District: Bago District
- Capital: Bago

Area
  - Total: 1,121.7 sq mi (2,905.1 km^{2})
- Elevation: 31 ft (9.5 m)

Population (2019)
  - Total: 439,622
  - Density: 391.94/sq mi (151.33/km^{2})
  - Ethnicities: Bamar; Karen; Mon; Palaung; Indian
  - Religions: Buddhism; Christianity; Hinduism
- Time zone: UTC+6.30 (MMT)

Bago Township or Pegu Township is a township in Bago District in the Bago Region of Burma. The principal town is Bago. Bago Township is an urban township with Bago city taking up 96.53 square miles (250 km^{2}) of the township. Bago Township has 40 wards that create 3 cities (Bago, Payagyi and Ingadaw) and 211 villages grouped into 66 village tracts.

Bago is the capital of Bago Region and has been the capital of various Mon and Burmese kingdoms and empires throughout its history. It remains important to the cultural heritage of the Mon people, even though they are now a small minority of the Township's many residents.

== Geography ==
Bago Township lies on the eastern foothills of the Bago Yoma mountains and is naturally heavily forested. The north part of the township has higher hills and thicker forests. These forests have many species of trees including Teak, Lebbek trees and Champak trees. The areas outside Bago city are mostly forest preserves, primarily in the north. Various herbs of medicinal value may also be found in these forests. Endangered animals like Elephants, Hill Turtles and Leopards as well as other animals like wild hogs, goats, cats and dogs are found within these preserves.

The Bago River runs through the middle of the township from northwest to southwest bending around the Bago Yoma towards the Yangon River. The Township is bounded on its west by the Lagunpyin Stream which, like other streams in the township, flow into the Bago River. There are 2 major dams within the township on the Bago and Sittaung Rivers, mostly for flood protection and freshwater supply.

== Demographics ==
=== 2014 ===
Historical Population
| Year | Pop. | ±% |
|---|---|---|
| 1973 | | — |
| 1983 | | — |
| 2014 | 491,434 | — |
| 2018 | 437,222 | −11.0% |
| 2019 | 439,622 | +0.5% |
Source: Ministry of Labor, Immigration, and Population and General Administration Department data

The 2014 Myanmar Census reported that Bago Township had a population of 491,434. The population density was 169.2 people per km^{2}. The census reported that the median age was 26.6 years, and 92 males per 100 females. There were 107,132 households; the mean household size was 4.4.

=== 2019 ===
As of 2019, 88.73% of the Township is Bamar with a significant Karen, Mon, Palaung and Burmese Indian population. 49.8% of the population lives outside of urban land. Although the township has 3 cities, Payagyi and Ingadaw are much smaller towns with 19,551 and 29,698 residents respectively. Buddhists make up 93.58% of the Township with Christianity being the second most populous at 4.1%.

== Economy ==
Bago Township has a diverse economy with many service sector jobs and a significant agricultural sector. The major roads and waterways passing through Bago make trade, transport and communication abundant in the township. The primary export of the town is milled and unmilled rice, mostly to Yangon Region.

Rice is primarily harvested during the Monsoon Season with a significant off-season harvest during the summer. During the cool season, peanuts and mung beans are grown in the township. Corn and bird feed (primarily for chickens) are also important year-round crops. The township also has a sizeable amount of vegetable farming for subsistence and, to a lesser extent, for sale.

Bago city has an industrial zone with several factories, mostly in textiles and shoe-making. Smaller factories and workshops within the city also create food products, plastics, electric meters, motors, wood products, tea and halwa. Some forest preserver areas are used for logging, mostly for teak and pyinkado. 55% of the Forestry in the Township is run by state-owned enterprises.
