= Road signs in Myanmar =

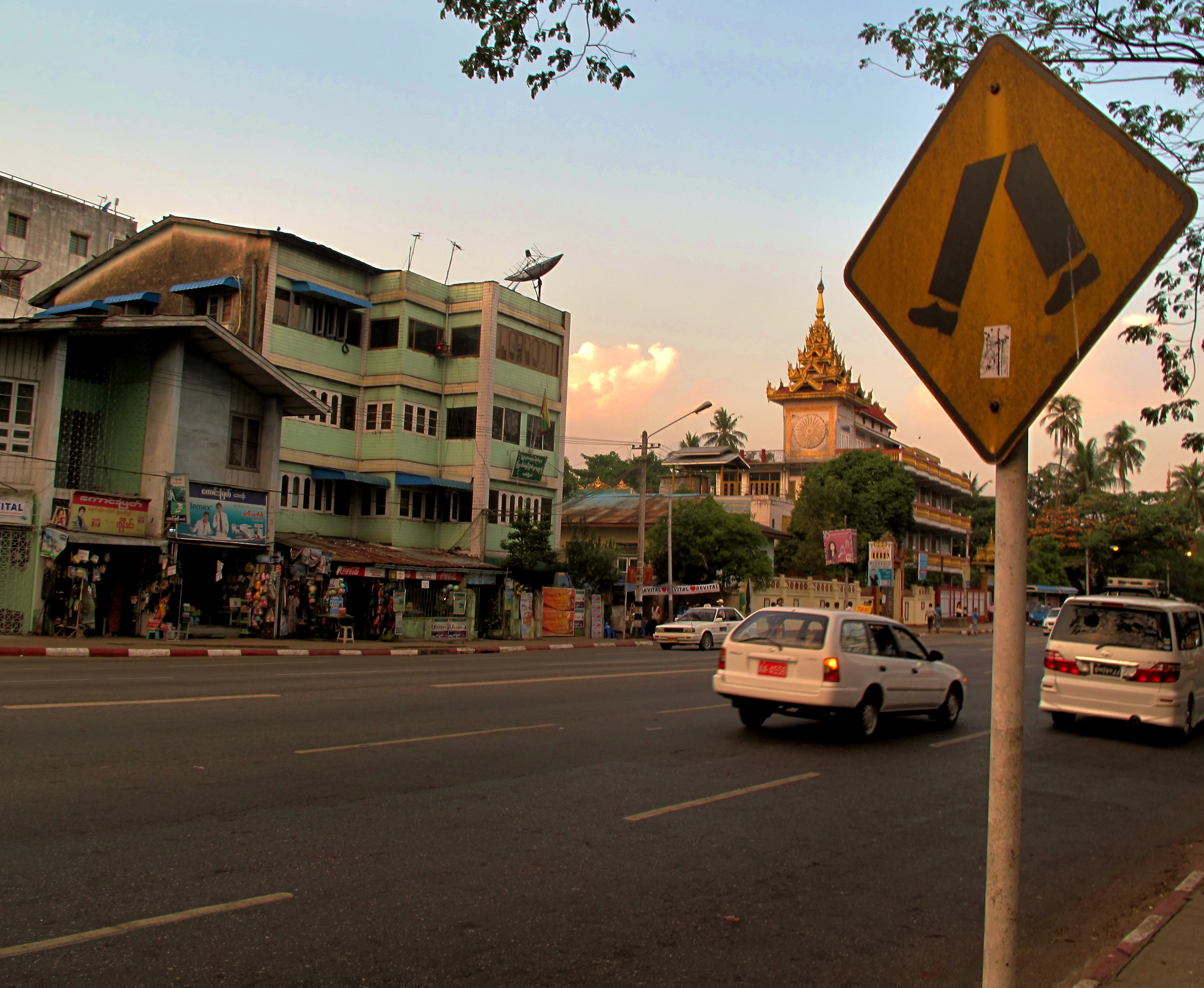
Crosswalk sign in Yangon

Road signs in Myanmar are the standardized visual indicators used on roads and highways throughout the Republic of the Union of Myanmar to regulate, warn, and guide road users. The system encompasses traffic signs, road markings, and signal devices designed to enhance road safety and traffic efficiency. Myanmar's road sign system is influenced by the Vienna Convention on Road Signs and Signals and domestic regulatory frameworks.

== History ==
Myanmar became a party to the Vienna Convention on Road Traffic and the Vienna Convention on Road Signs and Signals, acceding in June 2019.

In January 2022, the Road Transport Administration Department (RTAD), under the Ministry of Transport and Communications, released the Guidance on Road Signs, Markings and Signals (2022) (Burmese: လမ်းညွှန်များ၊ လမ်းအမှတ်အသားများနှင့် အချက်ပြများ (၂၀၂၂ ခုနှစ်)) to standardize and update the national design and application of road signs, markings, and signals. This directive reflects techniques aligned with Vienna Convention norms and supports nationwide uniformity.

== Warning signs ==
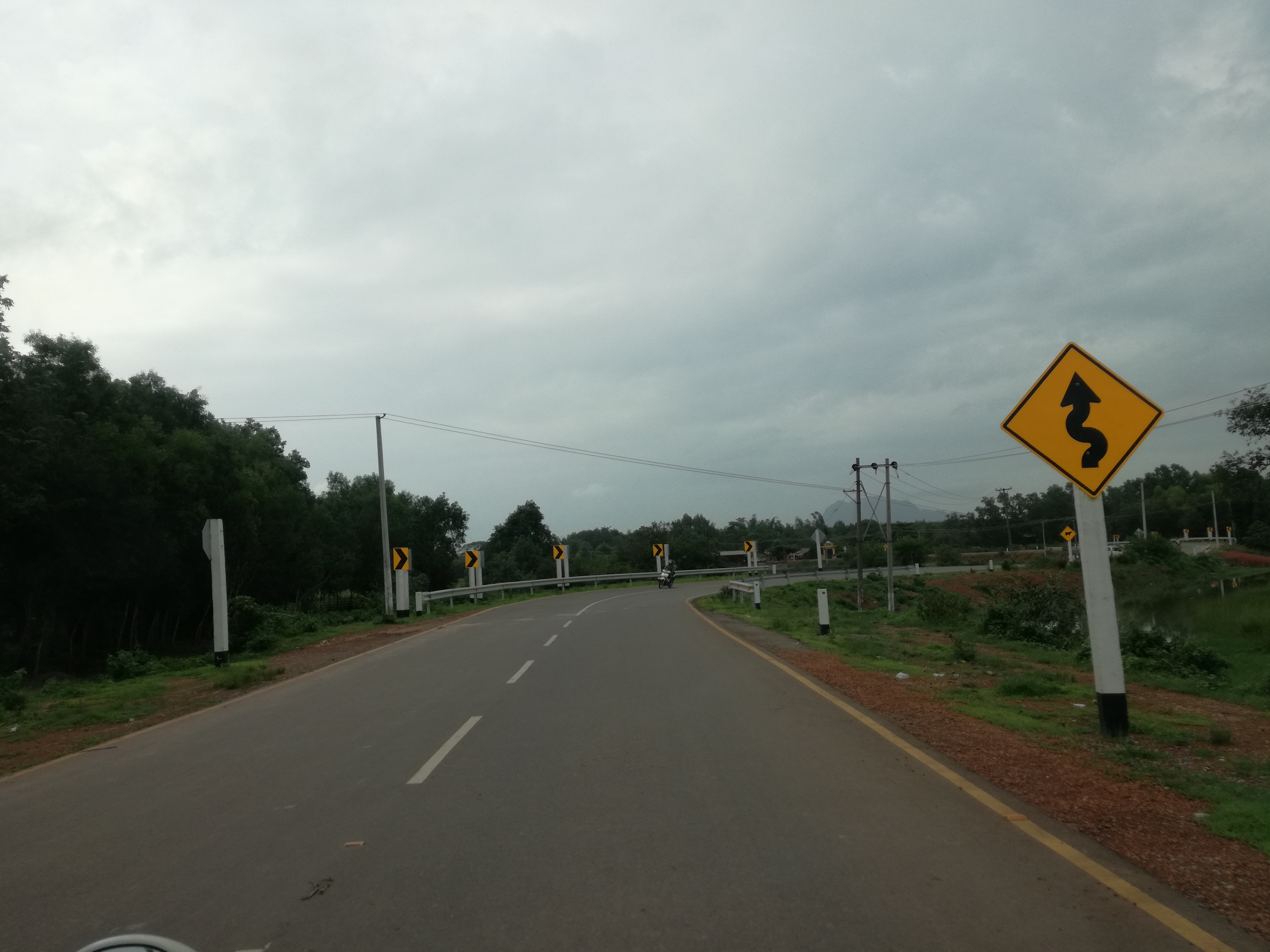
Winding road, chevron and animal warning road signs in Kayin State

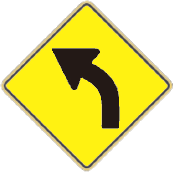
1
Curve (left)

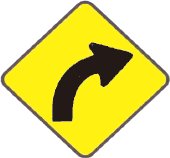
2
Curve (right)

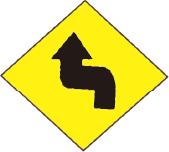
3
Reverse turn (left)

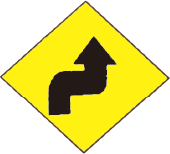
4
Reverse turn (right)

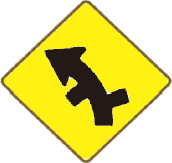
5
Curve with crossroad (left)

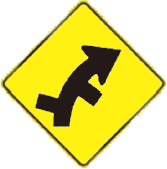
6
Curve with crossroad (right)

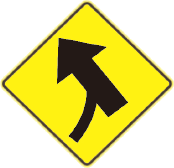
7
Merge left (entering roadway)

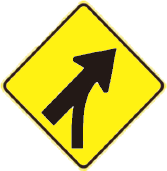
8
Merge right (entering roadway)

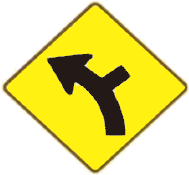
9
Curve with side road (left)

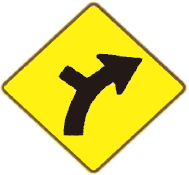
10
Curve with side road (right)

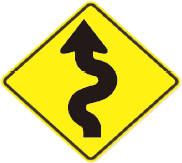
11
Winding road (left)

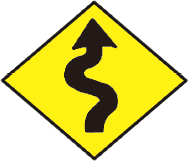
12
Winding road (right)

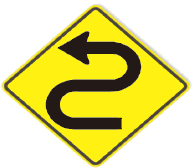
13
Double reverse curve (left)

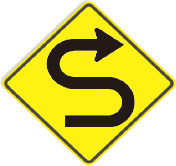
14
Double reverse curve (right)

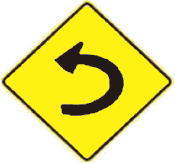
15
Hairpin turn (left)

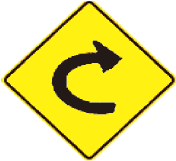
16
Hairpin turn (right)

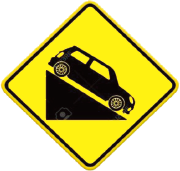
17
Steep descent

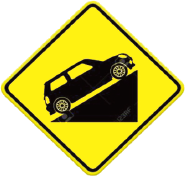
18
Steep ascent

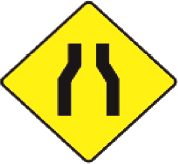
19
Road narrows

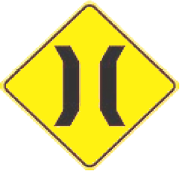
20
Narrow bridge

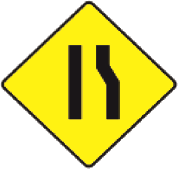
21
Lane ends (left)

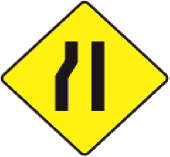
22
Lane ends (right)

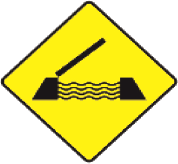
23
Opening Bridge

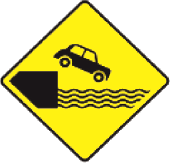
24
Open water

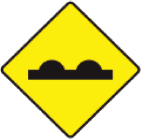
25
Uneven surface

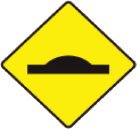
26
Bump

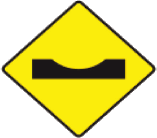
27
Dip

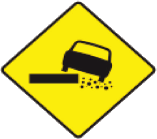
28
Soft shoulder

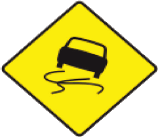
29
Slippery

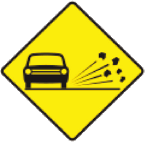
30
Loose gravel

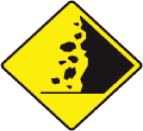
31
Rockfall

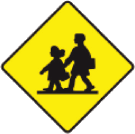
32
School Zone

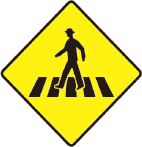
33
Pedestrian crossing

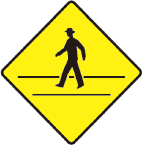
34
Pedestrian crossing

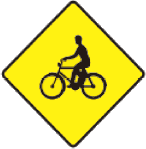
35
Bicycle

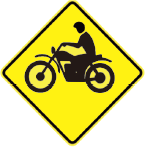
36
Motorcycle

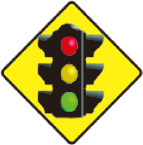
37
Traffic light ahead

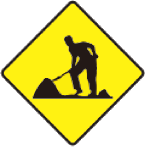
38
Road works

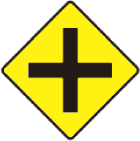
39
Crossroad

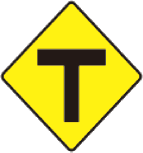
40
T-intersection

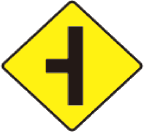
41
Side road (left)

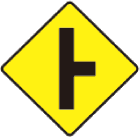
42
Side road (right)

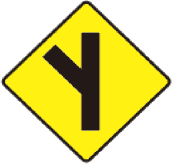
43
Side road at an acute angle (left)

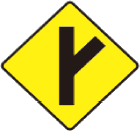
44
Side road at an acute angle (right)

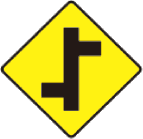
45
Offset side roads (left and right)

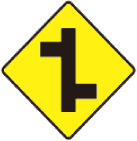
46
Offset side roads (right and left)

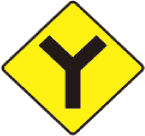
47
Y-intersection

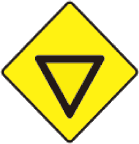
48
Yield sign ahead

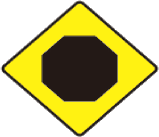
49
Stop sign ahead

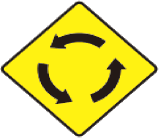
50
Roundabout

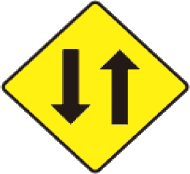
51
Two-way traffic

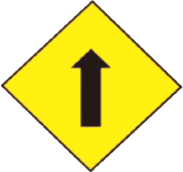
52
One-way traffic

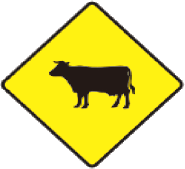
53
Animal

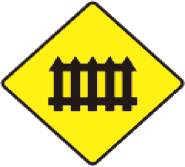
54
Railway crossing ahead (with barriers)

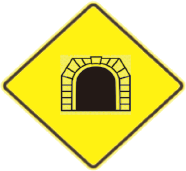
55
Tunnel ahead

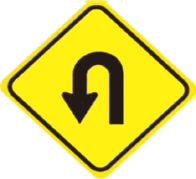
56
U-turn ahead

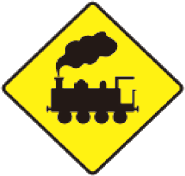
57
Railway crossing ahead (without barriers)

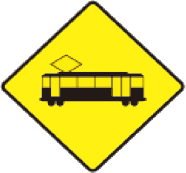
58
Tramway crossing ahead

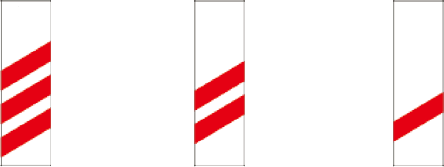
59
Level crossing countdown markers

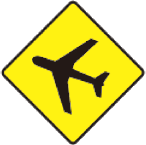
60
Low-flying aircraft

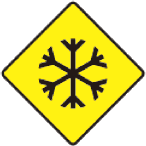
61
Ice

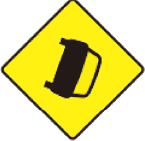
62
Accident

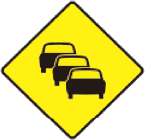
63
Traffic congestion or queues

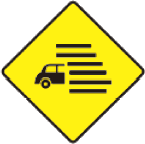
64
Fog

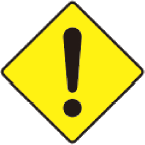
65
Danger

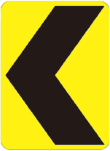
66
Chevron (left)

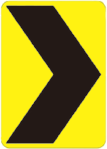
67
Chevron (right)

68
Hazard delineators (left)

69
Hazard delineators (right)

70
Chevron delineators

== Regulatory signs ==
=== Priority signs ===
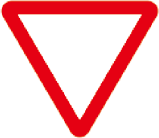
71
Yield

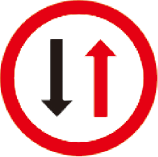
72
Yield to oncoming traffic

73
Stop (in Burmese)

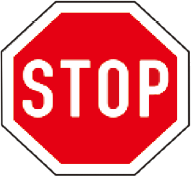
74
Stop

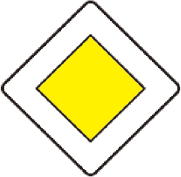
75
Priority road

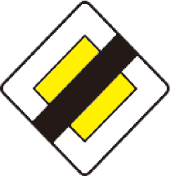
76
Priority road ends

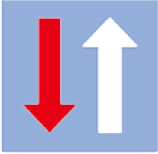
77
Priority over oncoming traffic

=== Prohibitory signs ===
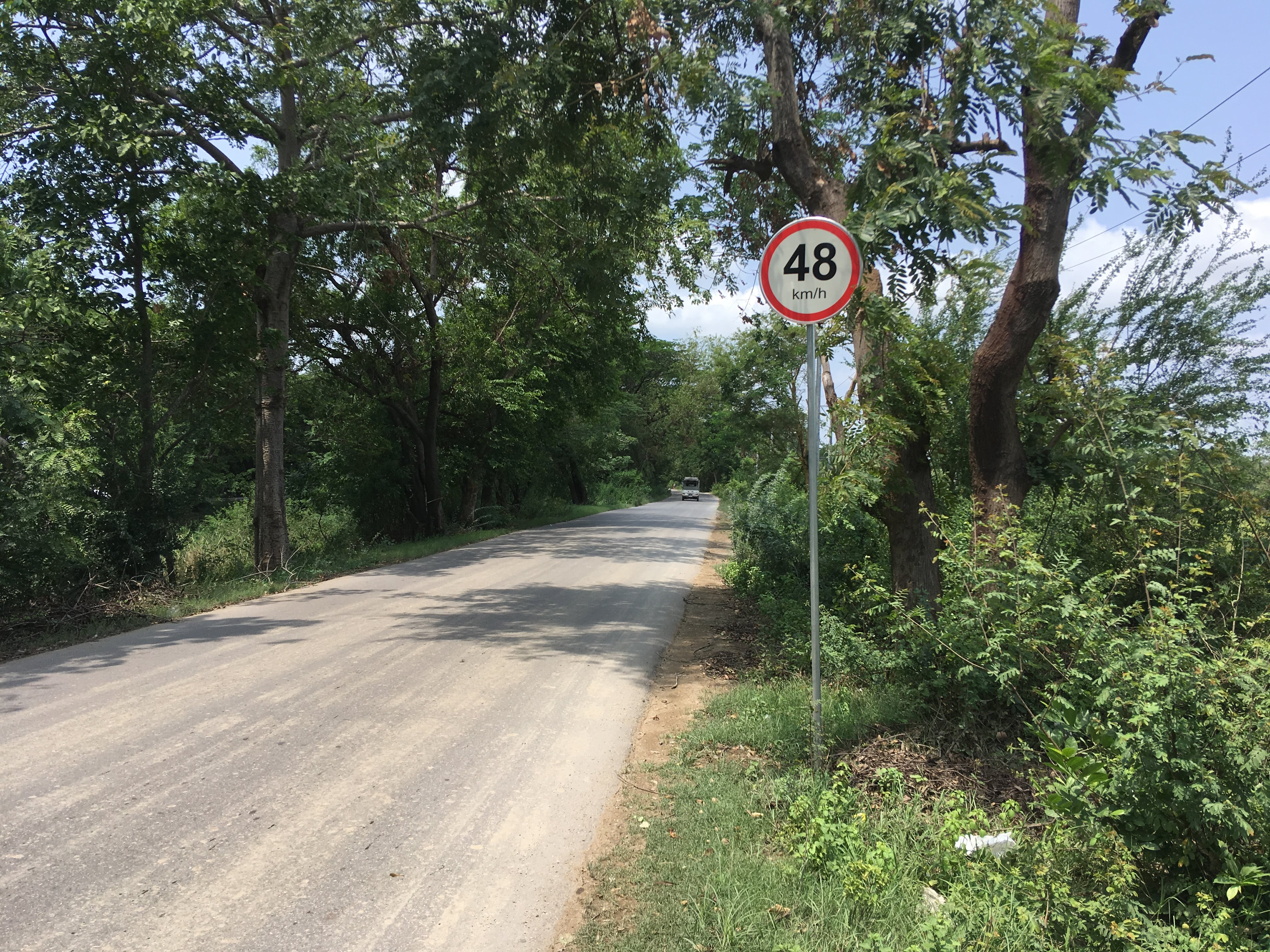
Speed limit road sign in Myanmar

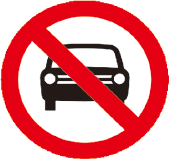
78
No motor vehicles

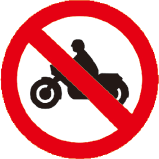
79
No motorcycles

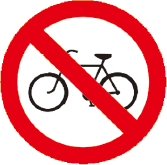
80
No bicycles

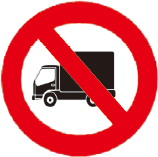
81
No trucks

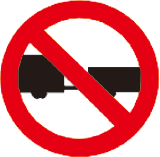
82
No trailers

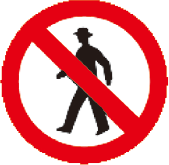
83
No pedestrians

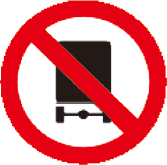
84
No hazardous cargo

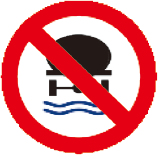
85
No water-polluting cargo

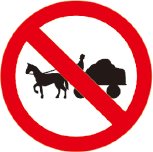
86
No animal-drawn vehicles

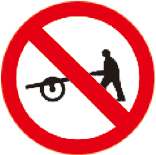
87
No handcarts

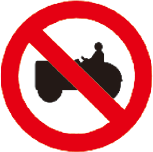
88
No tractors

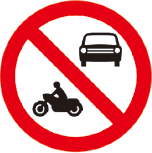
89
No motor vehicles

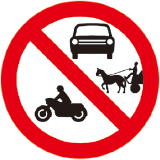
90
No motor vehicles and animal-drawn vehicles

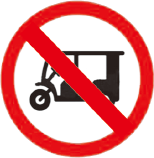
91
No three-wheeled vehicles

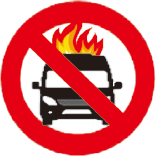
92
No explosive or inflammable cargo

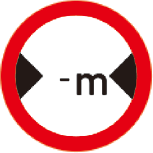
93
Width limit

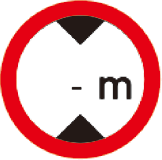
94
Height limit

95
No slow vehicles

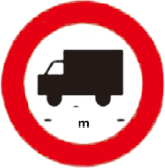
96
Length limit

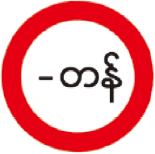
97
Weight limit

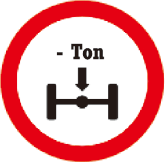
98
Axle load limit

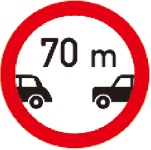
99
Driving of vehicles less than ... metres apart prohibited

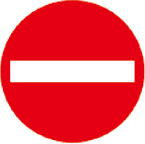
100
No entry

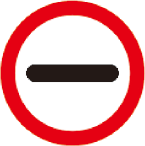
101
Stop for Inspection

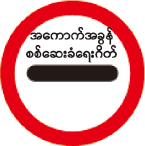
102
Stop at customs

103
Stop at customs (bilingual)

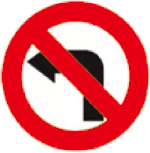
104
No left turn

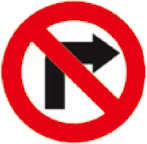
105
No right turn

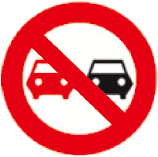
106
No overtaking

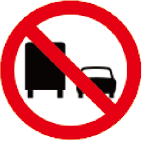
107
No overtaking by heavy vehicles

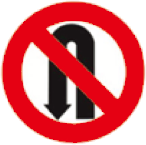
108
No U-turn

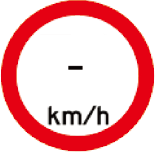
109
Speed limit

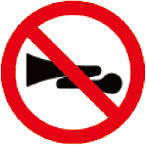
110
No honking

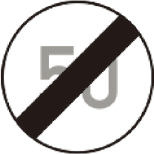
111
End of speed limit

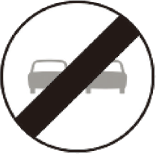
112
End of no overtaking

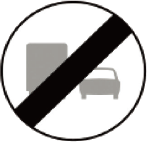
113
End of no overtaking by heavy vehicles

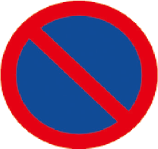
114
No parking

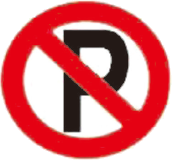
115
No parking

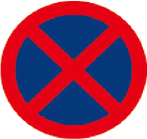
116
No stopping

=== Mandatory signs ===
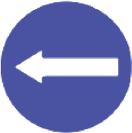
117
Go left

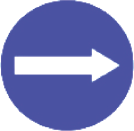
118
Go right

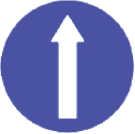
119
Go straight

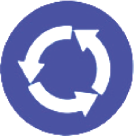
120
Roundabout

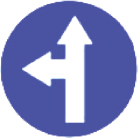
121
Go straight or left

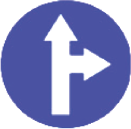
122
Go straight or right

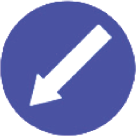
123
Keep left

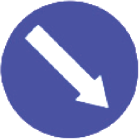
124
Keep right

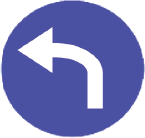
125
Turn left

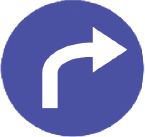
126
Turn right

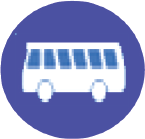
127
Buses only

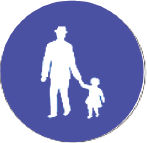
128
Pedestrians only

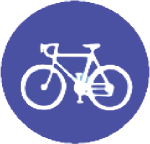
129
Cycles only

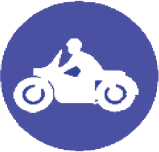
130
Motorcycles only

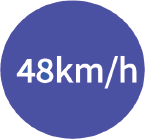
131
Minimum speed limit

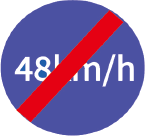
132
End of minimum speed limit

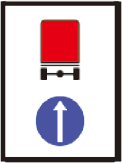
133
Route for vehicles carrying dangerous goods (straight)

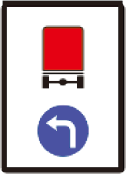
134
Route for vehicles carrying dangerous goods (left)

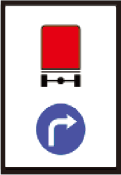
135
Route for vehicles carrying dangerous goods (right)

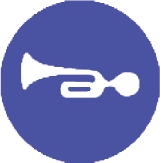
136
Horn

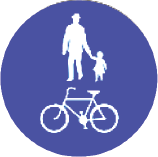
137
Shared pedestrian and cycle path

== Information signs ==
=== Special regulation signs ===
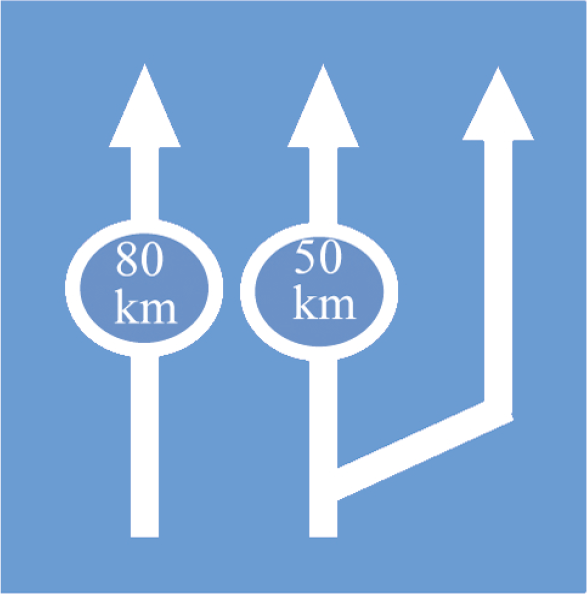
138
Minimum speed applying to different lanes

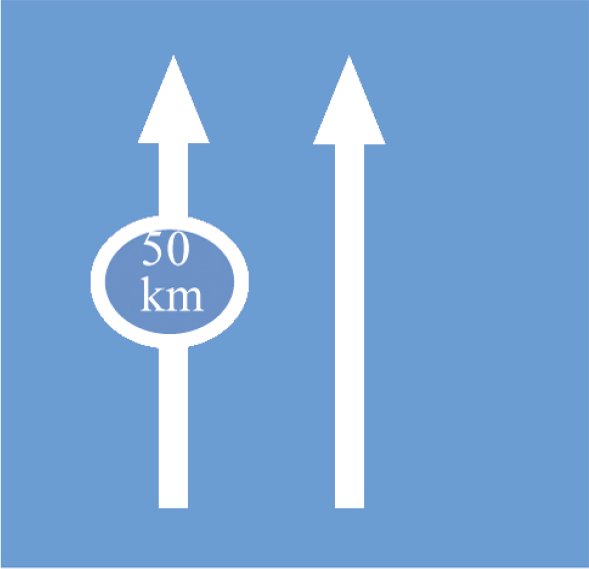
139
Minimum speed applying to one lane

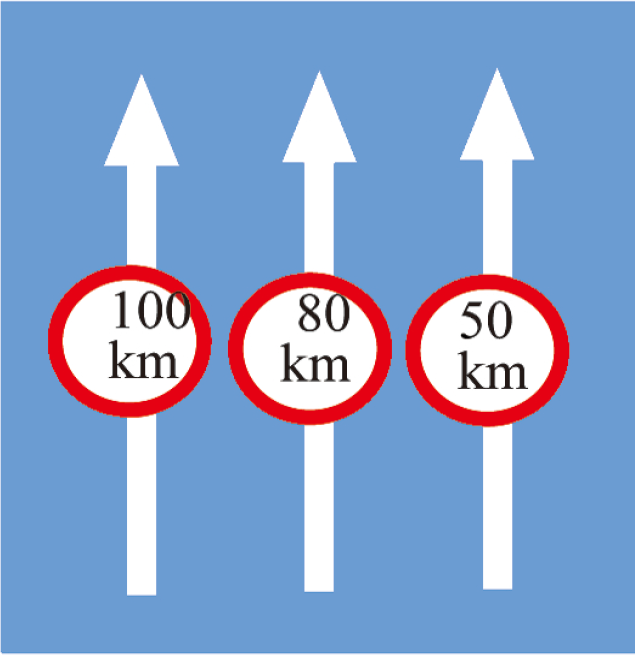
140
Speed limits applying to different lanes

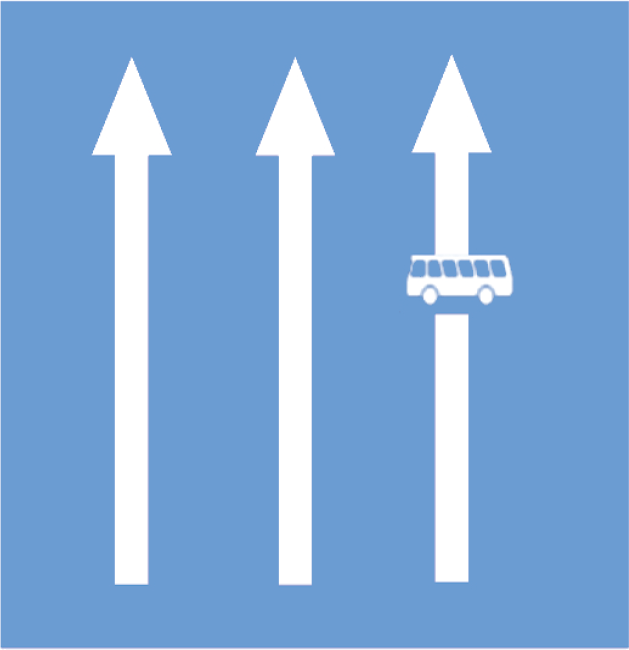
141
Lanes reserved for bus

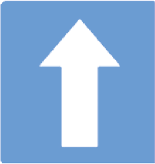
142
One way (straight)

143
One way (left)

144
One way (right)

145
One way with text (left)

146
One way with text (right)

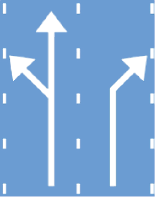
147
Preselection sign

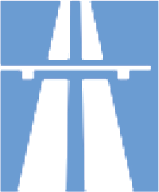
148
Motorway

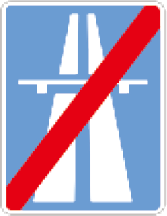
149
End of motorway

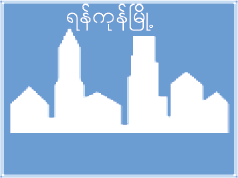
150
Beginning of a built-up area

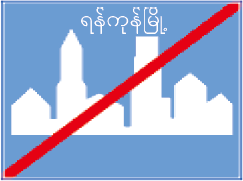
151
End of a built-up area

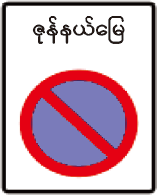
152
No parking zone

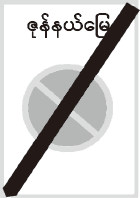
153
End of no parking zone

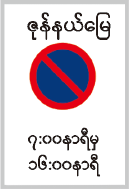
154
Time-restricted no parking zone

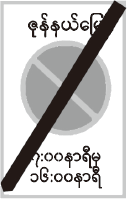
155
End of time-restricted no parking zone

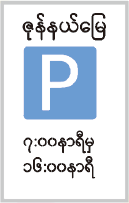
156
Time-restricted parking zone

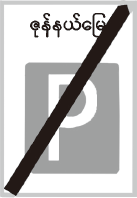
157
End of time-restricted parking zone

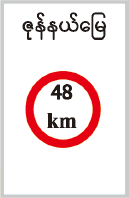
158
Speed limit zone

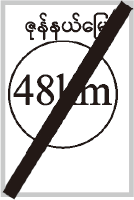
159
End of speed limit zone

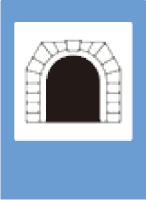
160
Tunnel

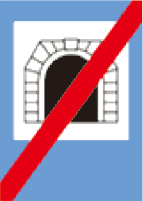
161
End of tunnel

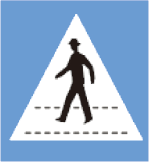
162
Pedestrian crossing

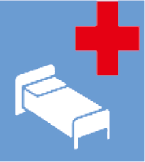
163
Hospital

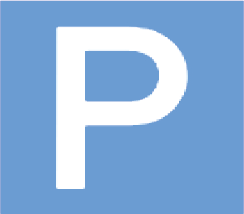
164
Parking

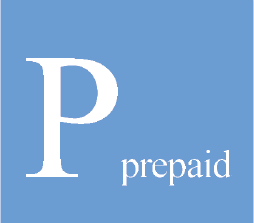
165
Pre-paid Parking

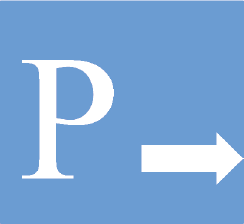
166
Parking

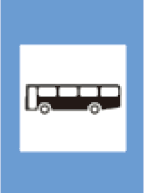
167
Bus stop

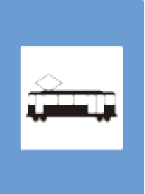
168
Tram stop

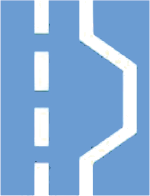
169
Emergency stopping place

=== Information, facilities and service signs ===
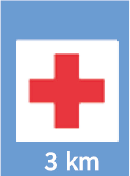
170
Hospital with distance

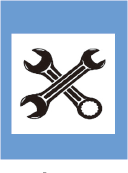
171
Breakdown service

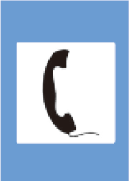
172
Public telephone

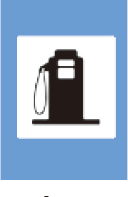
173
Filling station

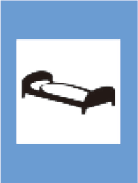
174
Hotel or motel

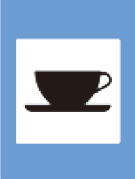
175
Refreshments or cafeteria

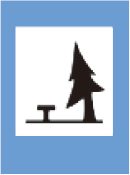
176
Picnic site

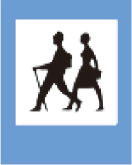
177
Starting point for walks

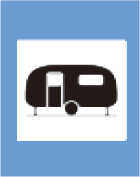
178
Caravan site

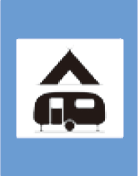
179
Camping and caravan site

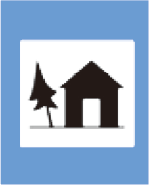
180
Youth hostel

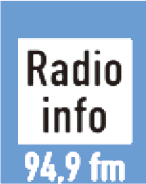
181
Radio stations giving traffic information

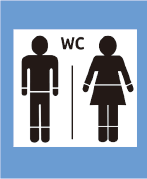
182
Public toilets

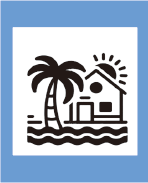
183
Beach or swimming pool

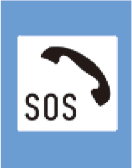
184
Emergency telephone

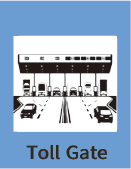
185
Toll gate

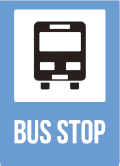
186
Bus stop

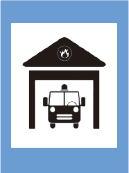
187
Fire station

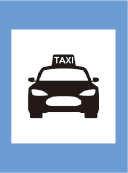
188
Taxi

=== Direction, position and indication signs ===
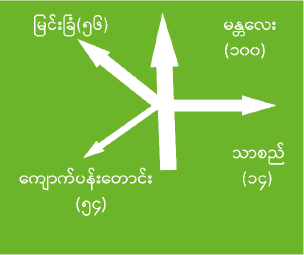
189
Interchange advance guide

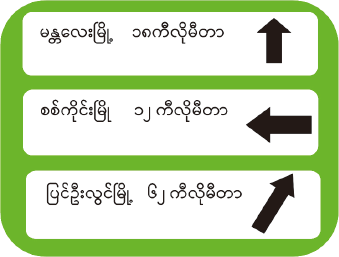
190
Advance directions with distance

191
Direction of places

192
Direction of roads

193
Direction of places with distance

194
Direction of airports

195
Direction of places with distance

196
Direction of fuel station

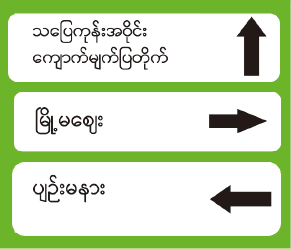
197
Directions of places

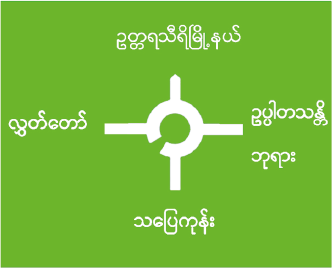
198
Roundabout advance guide

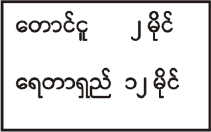
199
Distance to places

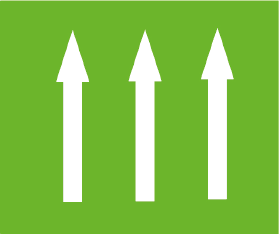
200
Sign indicating the number and direction of traffic lanes

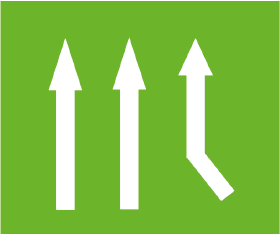
201
Sign indicating the number and direction of traffic lanes

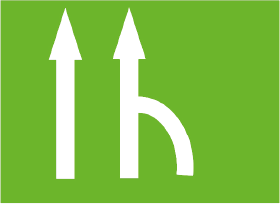
202
Sign indicating the number and direction of traffic lanes

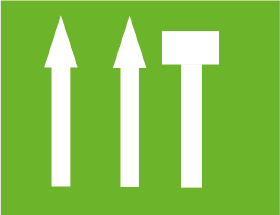
203
Sign indicating closure of a traffic lane

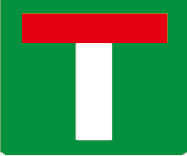
204
No through road

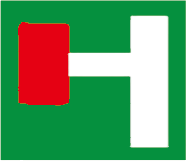
205
No through road

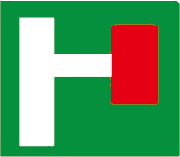
206
No through road

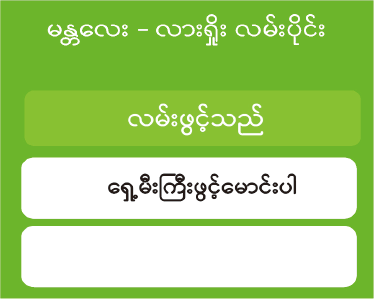
207
Road condition (opened)

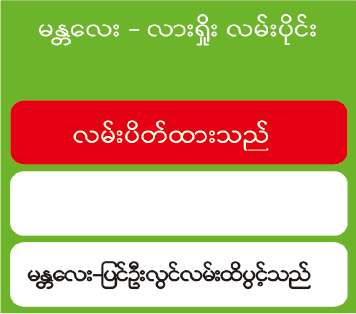
208
Road condition (closed)

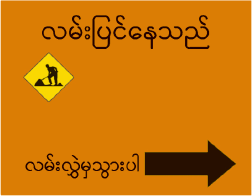
209
Temporary route change

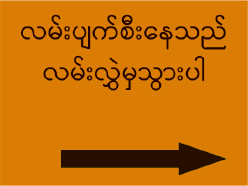
210
Temporary route change

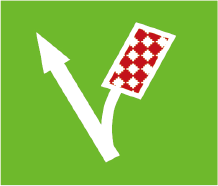
211
Emergency escape lane

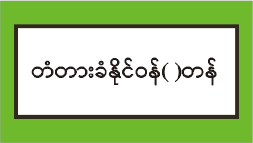
212
Bridge weight limit

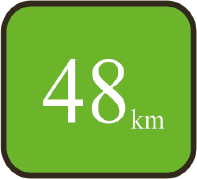
213
Advisory speed

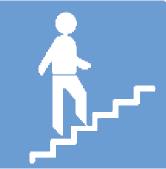
214
Pedestrian overpass

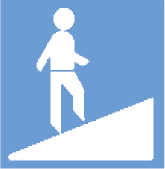
215
Pedestrian overpass

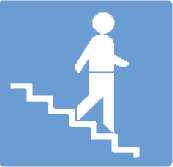
216
Pedestrian underpass

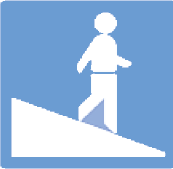
217
Pedestrian underpass

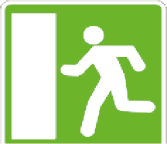
218
Emergency exit

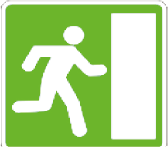
219
Emergency exit

220
Emergency exit with distance

221
Emergency exit with distance

222
Emergency exits with distances

=== Additional panels ===
223
Distance to...

224
Length of...

225
Side extension (of parking or stopping ban)

226
Side extension (of parking or stopping ban)

227
Beginning (of parking or stopping ban)

228
Continuation (of parking or stopping ban)

229
Ending (of parking or stopping ban)

230
Side extension (of parking or stopping ban)

231
Parking place for handicapped persons

== Route signs ==
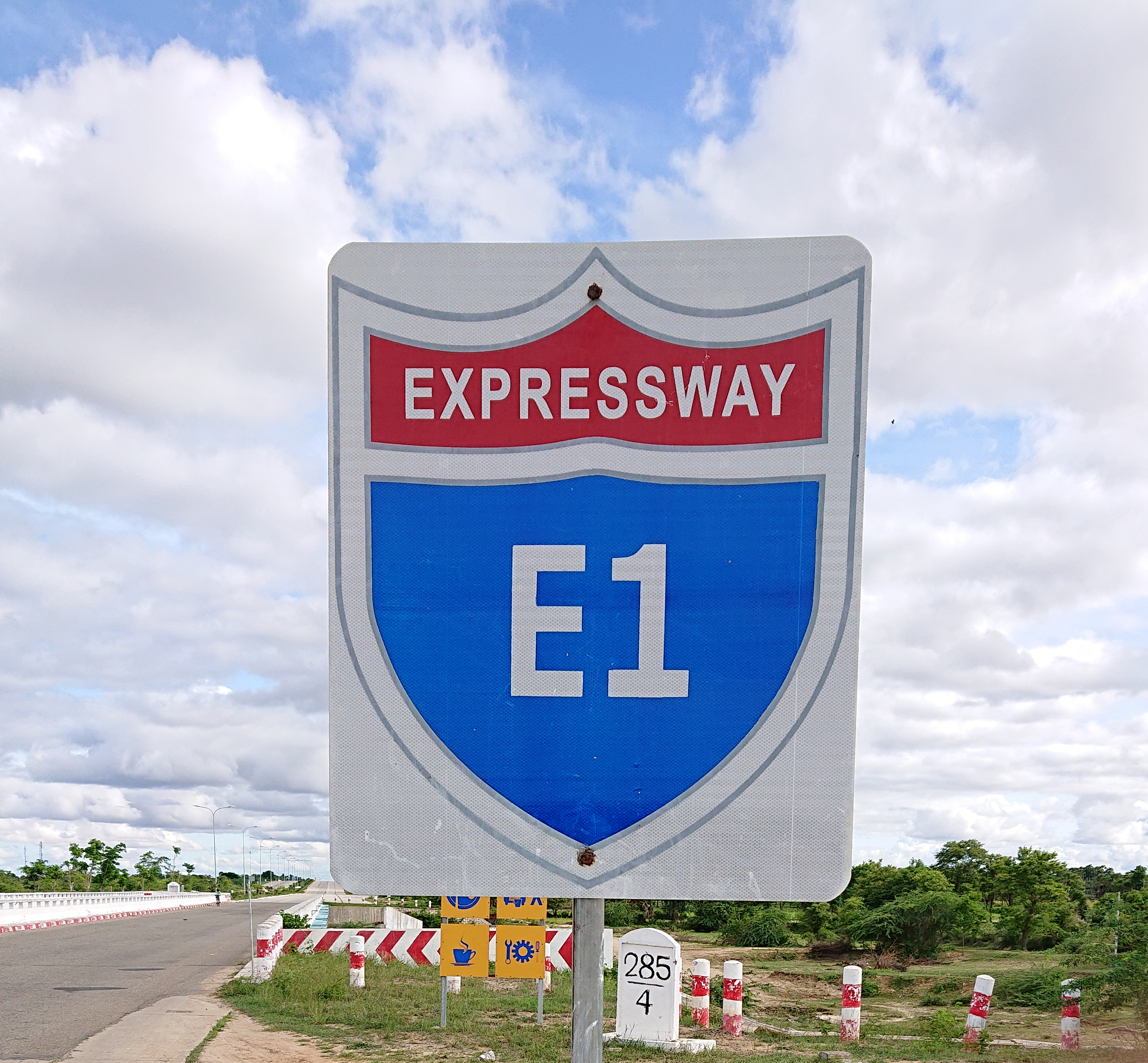
Yangon-Mandalay Expressway E1 sign

National Highway Route Marker (1-digit)

National Highway Route Marker (2-digits)

== See also ==
- Roads in Myanmar
