= Mon State Defense Force =

Ethnic armed group in Myanmar

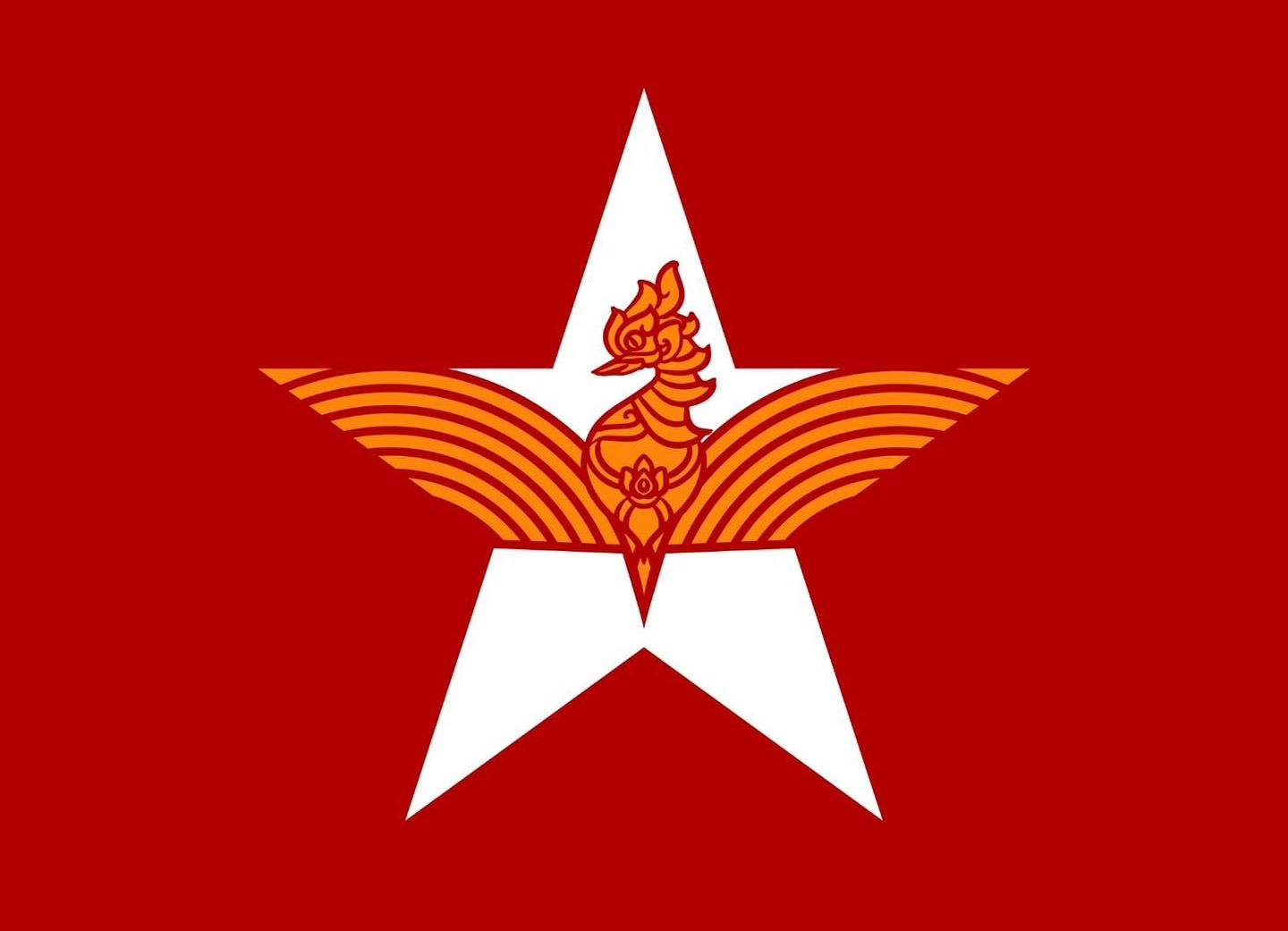
- Flag of the MSDF
- Dates active: 2021-present
- Active regions: Mon State; Kayin State
- Ideology: Mon nationalism Federalism

The Mon State Defense Force (MSDF) is an ethnic armed resistance group in Myanmar, established around September 2021 following the military coup. It was formed with the primary goals of protecting the Mon people, ensuring regional security, and eventually establishing a self-administered or sovereign Mon State.

== History ==
In August 2022, marking Mon Revolution Day, the Mon State Defense Force (MSDF) formally urged the community to support the Spring Revolution by contributing manpower and financial resources. Led by Steering Committee head Nai Ko Thu, the MSDF aimed to leverage national opposition to the military junta to advance self-determination.

In April 2024, the Mon State Defense Force (MSDF) and the Mon State Revolutionary Force (MSRF) formed a military alliance involving joint training, equipment production and intelligence sharing. This cooperation furthered a broader initiative to establish the Ramanya Joint Military Column and move toward a unified Mon Army command.

Four Mon armed resistance groups - the MSDF, MSRF, MLA and MNLA-AD have merged to form the Ramanya Joint Military Column, aiming to consolidate operations against the Myanmar military regime in Mon State. This alliance seeks to increase tactical efficiency, establish a unified military command and ultimately create a single, unified Mon Army to support the anti-coup movement.

The MSDF faced an internal split in July 2025 after its political chairman, Dr. Thirimon Chan, was dismissed from duties due to mutiny. In retaliation, Chan established the Mon State Defense Force - Central on 15 July, with himself as commander-in-chief. The MSDF established an inquiry committee to investigate the issue.
