= National Highway 36 (Myanmar) =

Road in Myanmar

National Highway 36 (NH36) is a road of northeastern Myanmar (formerly Burma).

The highway is fed by National Highway 31 from the south at Mansi at 24°12′19″N 97°15′30″E and goes in an easterly direction until it skirts the Chinese border and joins National Highway 3 coming from the south at Muse at 23°59′49″N 97°54′5″E.
