= National Highway 8 (Myanmar) =

Road in Myanmar

National Highway 8
- အမှတ် 8 ပြည်ထောင်စုလမ်းမကြီး
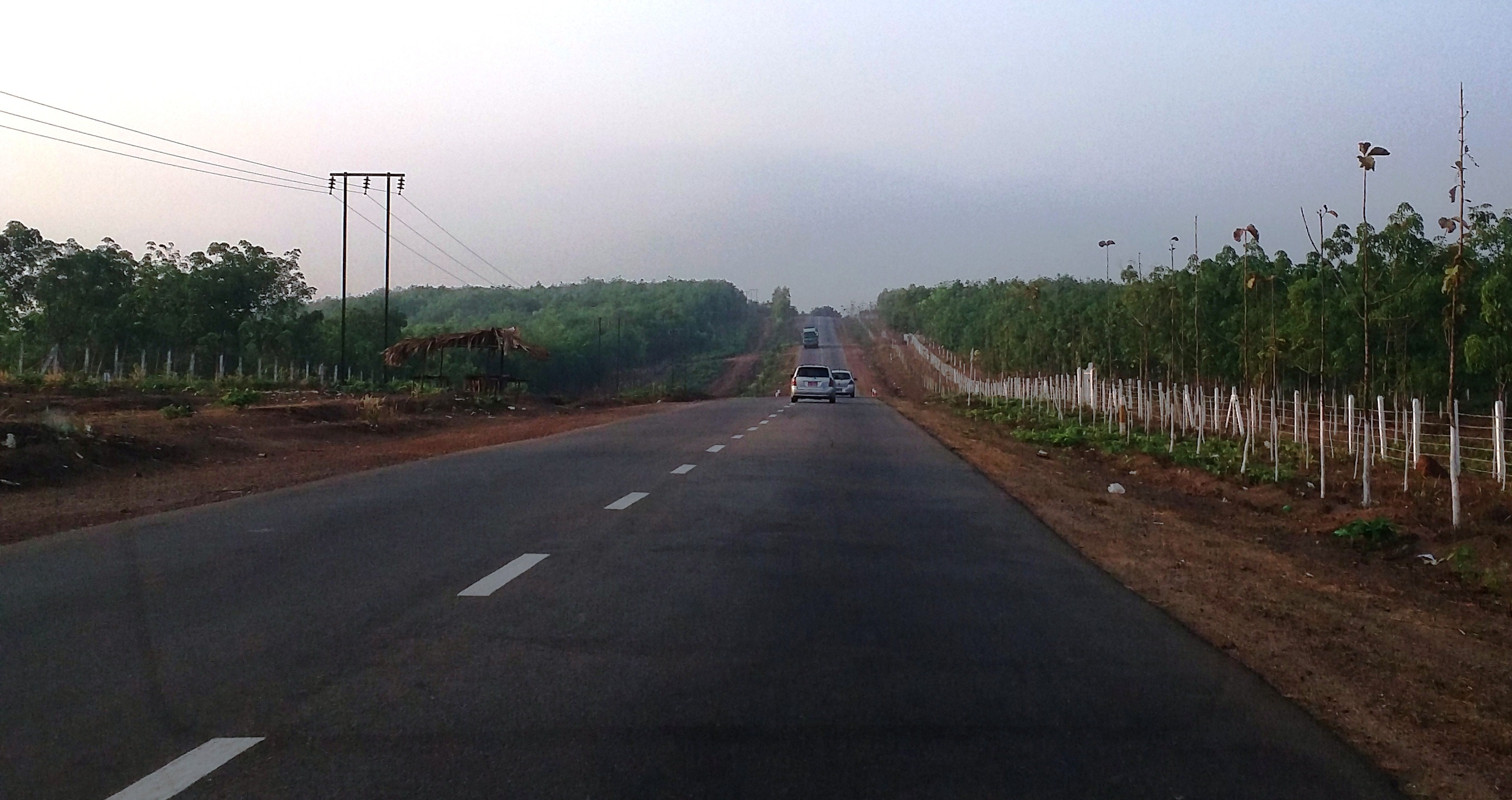

Route information
- Part of AH1

Major junctions
- North end: Payagyi
- South end: Myeik

Location
- Country: Myanmar
- Major cities: Thaton, Mawlamyine, Dawei, Myeik

Highway system
- Transport in Myanmar

National Highway 8 (NH8), or simply Highway No. 8 is the most important highway of southeastern Myanmar (formerly Burma). It runs from Payagyi to Myeik, connecting Bago to Myeik.

The highway is joined by National Highway 1 in Payagyi (north of Bago) at 17°28′27″N 96°31′39″E. At Thaton, it joins National Road 85. The highway then continues south and ends on the coast at Myeik at 12°26′32″N 98°35′43″E. It is also part of Asian Highway 1.

During the ongoing Myanmar civil war, Karen National Liberation Army and People's Defence Force groups took control of the highway between Ye and Thanbyuzayat in southern Mon State and set up checkpoints for the junta's military personnel travelling south.
