= National Highway 3 (Myanmar) =

Road in Myanmar

National Highway 3
- အမှတ် 3 ပြည်ထောင်စုလမ်းမကြီး
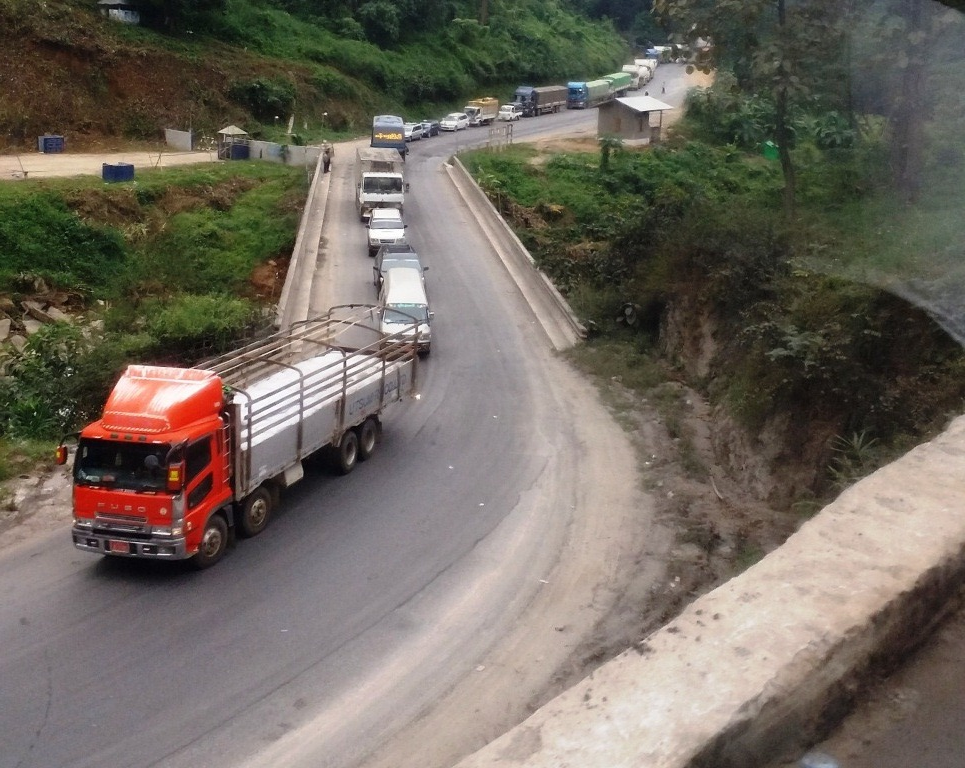

Route information
- Part of AH14
- Length: 477 km (296 mi)

Major junctions
- South end: Mandalay
- North end: Muse

Location
- Country: Myanmar

Highway system
- Transport in Myanmar

National Highway 3 (NH3) is one of the most important highways of central-eastern Myanmar. It connects Mandalay to Muse on the border with China.

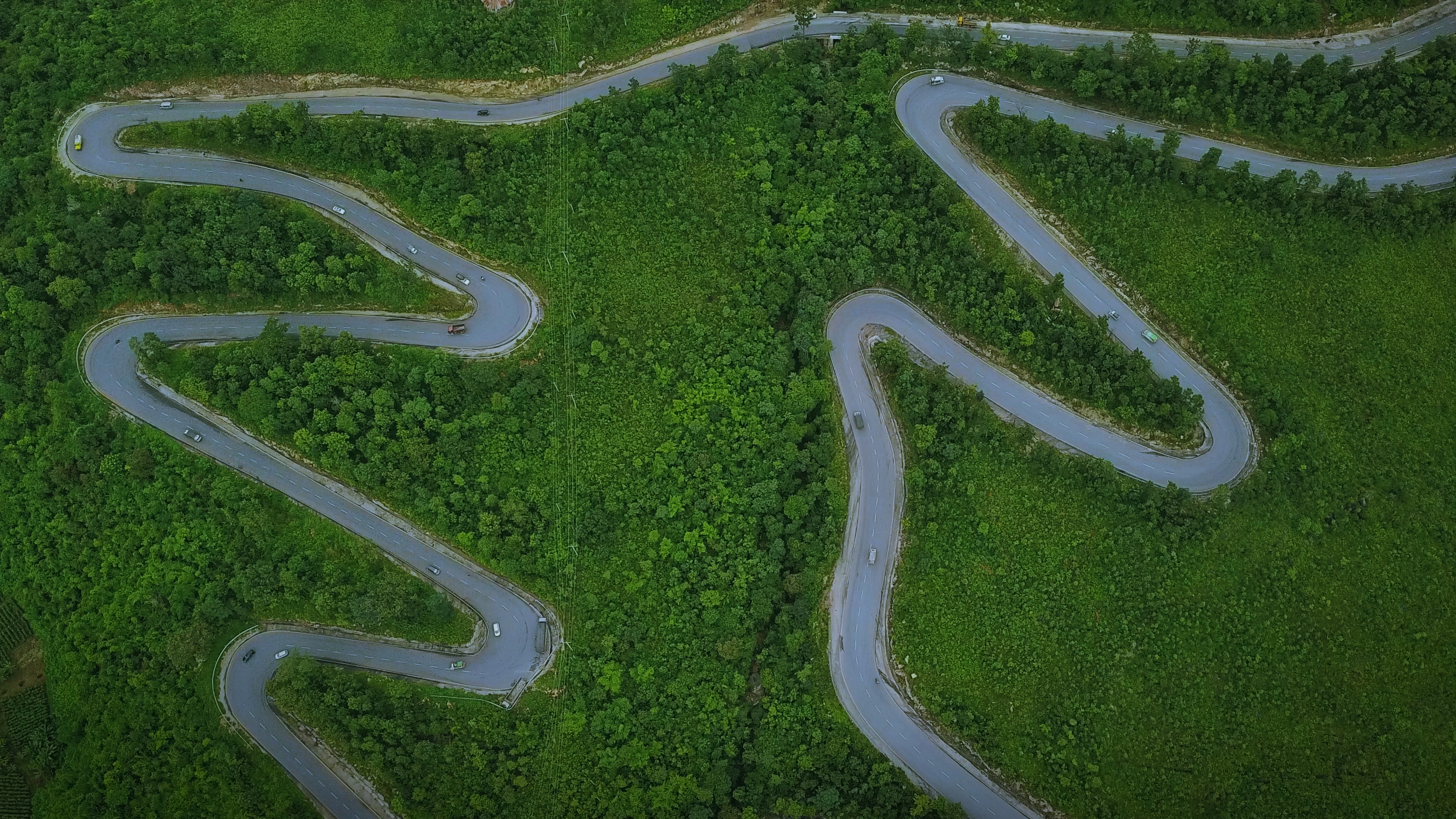
NH3 between Mandalay and Pyinoolwin

The highway is fed by National Highway 1 at Mandalay at 21°58′58″N 96°5′14″E coming from the south and 26th Street from the west. It initially goes in an easterly direction until it reaches the northeast suburb of Mandalay and then skirts the city outskirts by changing direction to the south. After moving in a southeasterly direction for several kilometres it then heads northeast for most of its passage. At Hsenwi it joins the National Road 34 to the east and continues north-northeast until it reaches Muse, where it is joined by National Road 36 from the southwest at 23°59′49″N 97°54′5″E.
