= Ramanya Joint Column =

Joint Mon military column in Myanmar

- Founded: December 2024
- Dates active: January–June 2025
- Groups: Ramonnya Mon Army; Mon State Revolutionary Force; Mon State Defense Force
- Active regions: Mon State; Karen State; Tanintharyi Region; Myanmar–Thailand border

The Ramanya Joint Column, also known as the Ramanya Joint Task Force, was a joint military force active in southern Myanmar. Its establishment was announced on 19 January 2025, by several Mon resistance organisations fighting against the military junta of Myanmar. The column contains the Mon National Liberation Army-AD, Mon Liberation Army, (Note: The MNLA-AD and MLA later merged into the Ramonnya Mon Army) Mon State Revolutionary Force, and the Mon State Defense Force. The groups first agreed to unify during a meeting on 19 December, 2024; using the column to test whether such unification was feasible. The purpose of the force is to encourage the unification of disconnected resistance groups fighting in Mon State. In the column, each Mon group contributes 25 soldiers, having 100 soldiers in total. The Mon groups also contribute 2 representatives each to the commanding committee, with an NMSP-AD representative being the senior-most officer.
