= National Highway 1 (Myanmar) =

Road in Myanmar

National Highway 1
- အမှတ် 1 ပြည်ထောင်စုလမ်းမကြီး
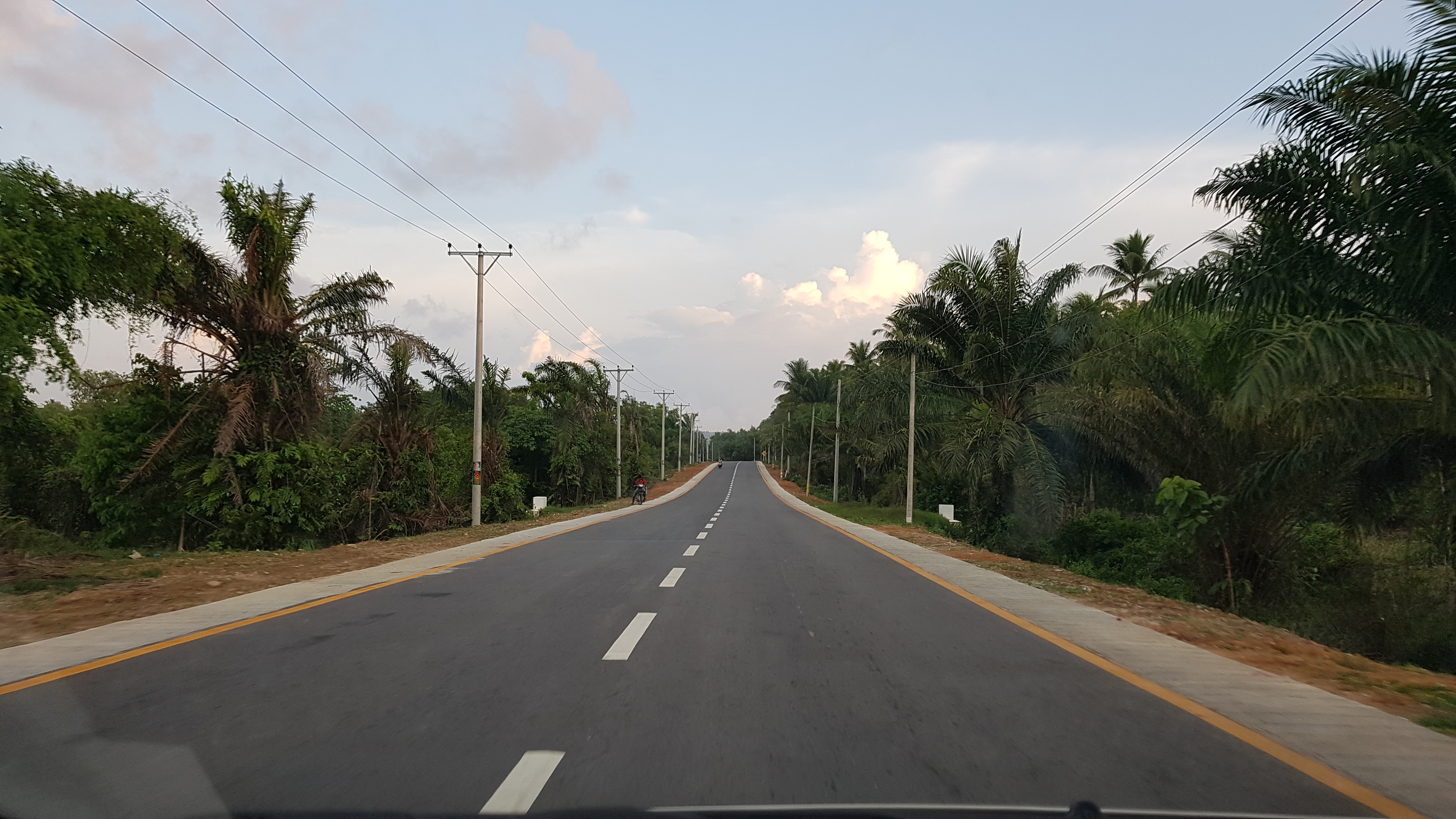

Route information
- Length: 1,193.03 km (741.31 mi)

Major junctions
- South end: Kawthaung
- North end: Payagyi

Location
- Country: Myanmar
- Major cities: Thaton, Mawlamyine, Dawei, Tanintharyi, Bokepyin

Highway system
- Transport in Myanmar

National Highway 1 (NH 1) is a national highway in Myanmar. The road runs north-south across the Malay Peninsula, from Kawthaung in the far south along the coast to Payagyi. At 1,193 kilometers, it is the longest national highway in Myanmar.

== Route description ==
National Highway 1 runs along the coast of southern Myanmar, in the narrow strip of land wedged between the Andaman Sea and the Tenasserim Hills on the border with Thailand. The route begins in Kawthaung, Myanmar's southernmost city, on a peninsula opposite the border with Thailand. The road runs north through tropical rainforest, initially flanked by mountain ranges. The road is very winding and of poor quality, but it is paved. NH 1 runs through the coastal area and therefore has several large bridges. The road runs slightly inland from the small town of Myeik and also passes just outside Dawei.

North of Dawei, National Highway 1 is less winding and runs through somewhat flatter terrain with longer, straight stretches. The road often runs along the foothills of mountain ranges further east. In the town of Mawlamyine, a combined Thanlwin Bridge, over 2.5 kilometers long, crosses a river delta. The road then skirts the Gulf of Martaban and turns west, ending at National Highway 12 at Payagyi, 80 kilometers north of Yangon.

== History ==
National Highway 1 has traditionally been a relatively important and strategic road along the west coast of southern Myanmar. The northern section, extending to Thaton, is important for international traffic to Thailand, and there are no major border crossings further south. On April 18, 2005, the Thanlwin Bridge in Mawlamyine opened to traffic, making it the longest bridge in Myanmar at the time. The route is fully paved.

The road was previously designated National Highway 8. Following a renumbering of Myanmar's road network around 2021, it was renumbered National Highway 1. It is the southernmost numbered road in Myanmar.

This number of National Highway 1 was once used as the "Road to Mandalay". It is an important north-south highway in central Myanmar and the busiest highway in Myanmar. It connects Yangon and Meiktila, where it joins National Highway 4 to the east, and then NH1 continues north to Mandalay.
