= Payagyi =

Hpayargyi ဘုရားကြီး
- Town
- Location in Myanmar
- Coordinates: 17°28′31″N 96°31′36″E
- Country: Myanmar
- Region: Bago Region
- District: Bago District
- Township: Bago Township
- Village tract: Hpayargyi village tract
- Elevated from village: 23 May 2013

Area
  - Total: 7.04 sq mi (18.2 km^{2})

Population (2019)
  - Total: 19,552
  - Density: 2,780/sq mi (1,070/km^{2})
- Time zone: UTC+6.30 (MMT)

Payagyi (Burmese: ဘုရားကြီး; also spelt Hpayargyi or Hpayagyi) is a town in Bago Township, Bago Region, Myanmar that was elevated from village status in 2013. The four villages the Hpayargyi village tract- Hpayagyi, Shansu, Taungpeteekone and Natkin- were consolidated into three urban wards of the newly created town of Payagyi by the Ministry of Home Affairs.

The town is located roughly 10 miles northeast of Bago via the Yangon-Mandalay Highway. Payagyi is also the ending point of National Highway 1 and serves as a junction along the Asian Highway Network between AH1's main route and its spur going to Yangon.

In 2014, the 2014 Myanmar Census counted 16,805 people in the three urban wards of Payagyi. In 2018 the General Administration Department estimated the population at 17,521 people, increasing to 19,551 people in 2019.
