= Operation 1111 =

2023 rebel military operation in Myanmar

Operations 1111 & Yan Naing Min
- Part of the Karenni theater in the Myanmar civil war
- From top to bottom: Map showing the battle of Loikaw during November 2023-May 2024; Map showing the battle of Loikaw during May–September 2024
Date	11 November 2023 – May 2026 (2 years, 5 months, 3 weeks and 6 days)
Location	Loikaw, Kayah State and surroundings
Result	Undetermined: Largely Status quo ante bellum, however some territorial shifts, see territorial changes below
Territorial changes	Initially in November 2023: More than half of Loikaw captured by anti-junta forces.; By mid-October 2024: Tatmadaw: Regains Loikaw and maintains Bawlakhe.; Karenni resistance: Take Demoso, Mobye and other settlements outside of Loikaw from Tatmadaw.; By late March 2025: Intense fighting along the Loikaw-Hsihseng road; Control over Mobye uncertain.; Karenni resistance control of Historical Karenni State estimated at 80%; By early July 2025: Tatmadaw and Pa-O National Army take Mobye and territory from the Karenni resistance, reducing their territorial control to 70%.; By early September 2025: Tatmadaw takes Demoso.; In February 2026: Siege of Hpasawng broken by Tatmadaw.; Bawlakhe Township listed under Tatmadaw's control, however it is uncertain how extensive that is.

Belligerents
Republic of the Union of Myanmar; Tatmadaw; Pa-O National Army (2024–)	Karenni State Interim Executive Council; Karenni ethnic armed organizations; Karenni National People's Liberation Front; Karenni Army; Karenni Nationalities Defence Force; People's Defence Force; Kayan National Army (Oct. 2024–); Pa-O National Liberation Army

Commanders and leaders
Brig. Gen. Aye Min Naung † (commander of the 44th Light Infantry Division)	Khun Bedu; Marwi; Lin Lin

Units involved
Tatmadaw: 54th Infantry Battalion; 261st Infantry Battalion; 250th Infantry Battalion; 362nd Artillery Battalion; 722nd Logistic Company; 7th Military Hospital	KNDF; KA; Demoso PDF; Phekon PDF; Moe Bye PDF; Naypyitaw PDF; Loikaw PDF; Various Local PDF; NUG Central Command

Strength
2,000 in Loikaw (July 2024); 4,000 in Loikaw (November 2024) 2,000 Junta + unknown number of Pa-O in Southern Shan (June 2025)	Unknown

Casualties and losses
3,808 killed as of 1 June 2025 (acc. to PKPF)	608+ killed (July 2024) 801 killed as of 1 July 2025 (acc. to PKPF)
- 350,000 internally displaced and 580 civilians killed. Since Feb 1 2021, start of the civil war til 30 June 2026: 878 civilians killed. The bulk within this articles time frame. Around 2000 civilians reported wounded. Demoso and Loikaw townships recording the highest dead of 248 civilians each. Material casualties reported as "3,405 houses, 67 religious buildings, 33 schools and 19 medical buildings" destroyed.

Operation 1111 (Burmese: ၁၁၁၁ စစ်ဆင်ရေး) is an ongoing military operation in Myanmar launched by Karenni Ethnic Armed Organisations (EAOs) including the Karenni Army (KA), Karenni Nationalities Defence Force (KNDF) and Karenni National People's Liberation Front (KNPLF). The operation was launched concurrently with Operation 1107, with the goal to capture Kayah State's capital city of Loikaw.

Around 35,000 people have reportedly been displaced due to the recent fighting in Kayah state. Tatmadaw troops have reacted to the offensive by erecting roadblocks in and around Loikaw. As of 7 January 2024, fighting is ongoing.

== Name and scope of the article ==
The first Karenni concurrent operation announced in 2023 was Operation 1107, with fighting reported in places like Mese outside Loikaw. Shortly afterwards, in November 2023, Operation 1111 was announced for Loikaw.

By February–March, most sources were already using Operation 1111, though the Washington Post used "The battle for Loikaw" for operation 1111 and "October offensive" for Operation 1027.

As of June–July 2024, most sources seem to have defaulted to using exclusively Operation 1111 for all Kayah/Karenni State related fighting. By August 2024, even some pro-Tatmadaw sources had started employing the term Operation 1111, though in combination with the generic label terrorist. The term became widely used despite changes on the battlefields since the launch of Operation 1111.

June 2025, Operation 1111 began to be mentioned in the past tense, mostly in reference to its first phase. Term seeing use as of September 2025. By October 2025, the past-tense use of the term expaneed to include the intensification phase.

The Tatamdaw's counteroffensive, which they called Operation Yan Naing Min starting August 2025, overlapped with coverage of Operation 1111.

== Background ==
Loikaw has been described as the military's nerve center for Kayah State. Its loss could jeopardize the regime's control of much of the state. It has been the site of multiple battles during the civil war: the first battle in 2021 that ended in a ceasefire, and another battle in January–February 2022 that ended inconclusively.

Before the start of the 2023 battle, the junta had two battalions deployed to defend the city.

== Fighting ==
=== Karenni offensive ===
Starting at 4:00am on 11 November, KNDF and KA forces started attacking military bases around Loikaw in an operation dubbed "Operation 1111". The coalition forces captured seven military bases and shot down an aircraft.

By 13 November, the Karenni Nationalities Defence Force (KNDF) claimed it had taken several positions of the Tatmadaw. It was also reported that a total of 16 civilians had died in the fighting. The Irrawaddy reported that "volunteers estimate that around 35,000 people—including people displaced by previous conflicts—need to evacuate from Loikaw as a result of the recent fighting. The town is usually home to 50,000 residents. The capital is also the junta's key stronghold and center of administrative control in Kayah State."

By 15 November, there were reports of heavy fighting in Loikaw, with many civilians still trapped in their homes amid the ongoing fighting. More than 34 civilians were killed, and 50 were injured in Loikaw from retaliatory strikes from the junta's forces. During the fighting, 110 junta soldiers were killed and 38 surrendered.

By 18 November, the EAOs further gained control in Loikaw, including the Loikaw District Court and Loikaw University. The groups took 38 prisoners of war, who surrendered after the rebels cornered them before any air support could arrive. It was reported the number of displaced civilians had reached 40,000 and at least 50 were dead.

On 22 November, it was reported that 315+ fighters and civilians on both sides had died during the first 10 days of Operation 1111 and that 100,800 people had been displaced in Kayah state, with 40,000 of those from Loikaw. The KNDF claimed to have taken further outposts from the Tatmadaw. The fighting had reached the downtown of Loikaw by 23 November. In an interview with The Irrawaddy on 28 November, the KNDF's deputy commander-in-chief Marwi claimed that the rebels already controlled 80% of Kayah state and had surrounded Loikaw, where an interim Karenni government was being established. With its ground forces in Kayah State weakened, on 29 November, the junta began to resort to airstrikes against Loikaw. In a report to the State Administration Council, Chairman Min Aung Hlaing claimed that the Tatmadaw had retaken the city, but these claims were denied the following day by Marwi.

Reports emerging in August 2025 stating Demoso town was captured by the Karenni by November 2023.

Lin Lin, a leader of the People's Defence Force in Kayah, stated that most of his fighters had been motivated to take Loikaw as they are from the city and wanted to return to their homes; while reporting that the Tatmadaw was on the defensive. On 2 December, KNDF chairman Khun Bedu reported that the Tatmadaw had retreated to the city police station. By this time, the military regime's administration was reportedly no longer functional in the city. Loikaw's Naung Yar and Daw Au Khu residential wards saw ongoing clashes and rebel forces claimed to have captured 50 soldiers and several weapons and ammunition.

On the 9th, Pyu Township was also reported to be under attack by insurgents. Pekon Township that neighbors Kayah State, but is in Shan State is also seeing fighting, with Demoso and Loikaw continuing seeing combat.

On 10 December, the KNDF took control of the main police headquarters in Loikaw.

On 11 December, the Irrawaddy stated, "The regime's Regional Command Center, Loikaw General Hospital, Nursing and Midwife School, the State Government Office and some religious buildings are still occupied by junta troops, according to resistance forces." By 18 December, anti-junta forces were reported to have control of 85% of Loikaw.

As of 15 December, fighting in Mobye is continuing and the insurgents claim to have taken 75% of the town. At least 5 civilians were reported to have been killed as a result of the fighting, with much of the town abandoned by the civilians. The casualties of fighting in Mobye include 11 Tatmadaw and 9 insurgent soldiers killed.

On 7 January, the Karenni rebel forces launched an offensive against Pekon. By the following day, they had captured the police station, as well as state and government offices, bringing most of the city under their control. More than two-thirds of the town's population fled the fighting. Ko Banyar additionally reported that fighting was continuing in towns throughout the state.

Mawchi has fallen to Karenni forces as of 29 January. Mawchi was taken by Karenni Nationalities Defense Force, which is an effort towards Taungoo where Karen National Union is already fighting. Thus the efforts in Kayah and Bago are linked. Fighting was reported in Mobye, Demoso and Loikaw. With 2/3 of Loikaw controlled by the Karenni forces. On 29 January, KNLA and PDF forces shot down a Tatmadaw Eurocopter AS365 with machine guns, sniper rifles, and RPGs as it was landing. Brigadier General Aye Min Naung of the 44th Light Infantry Division and the pilot were among the five recorded casualties.

==== Stalling of offensive ====
In February 2024, reports emerged that the Karenni resistance fight for Loikaw city was stalling. Life was continuing in the outskirts of Loikaw while the downtown area was depopulated. Markets, farming, and small businesses were opening in areas on the outskirts. During this time, the KNDF was consolidating control over much of Kayah since the Tatmadaw was sending reinforcements to Loikaw from elsewhere in Kayah. At this time, the Karenni resistance was still urging civilians not to return to Loikaw during the fighting.

The Irrawaddy reported in July 2024 that the offensive to take Loikaw had seen little progress since the Karenni took the Loikaw University.

==== Escalation ====
In March 2024, Al Jazeera reported a counter estimate on how much of Loikaw the Karenni forces actually control, stating "About half the city, controlled by the military since the coup, is now in the hands of the Karenni resistance". They further stated that the fighting in Kayah was escalating, with Demoso, Mese, Shadaw and Ywar Thit fully in Karenni control. Khu Reedu was the commander who took Shadaw for the Karennis. Shadaw also saw harsh fighting. Khu Reedu claimed Tatmadaw took 180 casualties dead, while the Karenni only 9 in the fight for Shadaw, with 6 civilians dead.

There were also reports of fighting in Pasaung. Al Jazeera also reported that the Tatmadaw is increasingly using military planes to bombard Karenni positions. In June, Channel 4 reported the Karenni were using customized drones to fight the military.

Karenni forces captured Hpasawng and most of Hpasawng Township on 14 March. On 4 May, Karenni forces launched an offensive on the last remaining junta forces in Hpasawng Township, killing 20 junta soldiers.

=== Tatmadaw counter offensive ===
On 29 May, it was reported that the Karenni were putting up intense resistance at several points of the route to Loikaw, which the Military is taking. Tatmadaw named this counter-offensive Operation Yan Naing Min. On 30 May 2024, the Irrawaddy reported the Tatmadaw had mounted an advance towards Loikaw. They also stated that the Karenni control 80% of Loikaw, meaning the control had increased from 2/3 to 4/5 of Loikaw since January (see above). With the Tatmadaw force being at Kayan Tha Yar with the direction towards the capital, while stating fighting in Loikaw itself was continuing daily. By 3 June, the 500 soldier column had reached the Loikaw-Mobye-Hsi Hseng intersection, known as the Kayantharyar intersection.

During 22 June, it was reported that Tatmadaw had lost military bases in Mobye, Demoso, Shadaw, Ywar Thit, Nammekon, Mawchi and Mese since the start of the operation.

On 1 July, junta forces began attacking KNDF positions south of Pinlaung, attempting to relieve the Karenni siege on Pekon.

=== Intensification in Loikaw and both on the offensive ===
The Irrawaddy reported on 8 July that fighting was intensifying after reinforcements of 500 troops had arrived to help the already stationed 1,500 Tatmadaw troops. The Atlas News reported that the reinforcing column had managed to take some initial territory around Loikaw after arriving. Methods included using infiltration tactics, by sending in soldiers into the rebel held area dressed as civilians to do reconnaissance for the Tatmadaw while the reinforced Tatmadaw advanced towards Loikaw University. The Karenni were reported to lack ammunition, making defending the area harder. The military regime claimed to have opened schools in previously contested areas of Loikaw. In light of this Karenni forces regrouped and announced a counterattack amidst this fighting on 4 July.

By mid July in Hpasawng Township there had been reports of fresh intense fighting, including Karenni claims of poisoned gas use by Tatmadaw against the resistance fighters. Meanwhile, in Loikaw, pro-Tatmadaw sources confirmed there to be continued fighting in Loikaw, Pekhon and Mobye. These sources also claimed that there had been Tatmadaw progress in the direction of Loikaw University. Chinaview reported the junta had intercepted a weapons shipment into Kayah State. In Loikaw itself, Karenni State Interim Executive Council where moving museum artefacts into safety from the fighting. The Irrawaddy stated the Tatmadaw has forced the Karenni on the retreat in parts of Loikaw.

By end of July, there emerged reports that soldiers had started intentionally setting civilian houses alight. Hmainglone, Ywardanshae, Htudungantha, Loikaw Technological University and Myakalat Mountain areas of Loikaw city were seeing fighting.

In early August, it was reported that Tatmadaw had secured Loikaw, including much of its rural township, according to Tatmadaw claims and civilian reports. KNDF states there are daily clashes around Loikaw including for the control of Loikaw-Demoso Union Highway. There are reports of Karenni advances as well, with two key military bases (Yaykyaw & Mae Salong) near Bawlakhe falling to the resistance fighters. While Myanmar Peace Monitor reported 608 Karenni fighters, 514 civilians had been killed since the 2021 coup.

Fighting around Mobye has also intensified, including damaging a nearby dam that has led to flooding in parts of Demoso, Mobye and Loikaw.

In early September KNDF shelled Loikaw in an attempt to kill Min Aung Hlaing. With the Irrawaddy reiterating that Loikaw has been lost to Tatmadaw, as mentioned above. While RFA reported the Karenni are taking bases and settlements around Loikaw. In retaliation for attempted killing of Min Aung Hlaing, the Junta conducted airstrikes of civilian targets. With information emerging that Min Aung Hlaing may have exposed himself, by taking a tour of conflict zones, due to internal criticism over recent military setbacks.

During the second half of September, fighting was reported along the Karenni-Shan border, killing dozens. With large parts of Kayah State at this time seeing flooding, affecting civilian life. This natural disaster was caused by Typhoon Yagi.

As of 20 September 2024, the Myanmar junta only has control of Loikaw and Bawlakhe Townships.

In December, reports emerged that as mentioned above in July already, the Karenni suffered ammunition shortages. But that now this was due to the Pa-O National Army cutting Karenni supply lines and thus causing the supply problems. Contributing to the Tatmadaw retaking Loikaw.

==== Post-Yagi situation ====
The Karenni State Interim Executive Council said 40,000 people have been displaced by Yagi and the Mobye Dam flooding. With other estimates that Kayah's agricultural production could fall by as much as 30% as a result. With many civilians in conflict areas risking food insecurity because of it. As of 2 October, the Junta census push is ongoing until 15 October. Stating that clashes were continuing and that there was the junta's risk of further attacks due to the census drive. Karenni resistance groups rejected the junta's offer to negotiate a peace agreement. The Junta is reported to have prevented aid from reaching some areas by putting in place road blocks, thus worsening the effects of Yagi. With some 200,000 people being displaced by Yagi.

=== Fighting along the Karenni-Shan Border area ===
During October fighting has been reported in North Kayah State. Amid the state still feeling some effects from Yagi. With a 1,000 Tatmadaw troops and additional Pa-O Militia attacking several settlements held by Karenni Resistance. Such as Pinlaung, Mobye and Pekon. While Frontline states Pekon had been taken in a military counter-offensive taking advantage of the flooding caused by Yagi. Karenni Army Adjutant-General Colonel Phone Naing however thinks Tatmadaw will not aim to hold the territory, but is seeking to shore up its supply lines. With fighting reported in Bawlake and Hparsaung as well. As of October, only Loikaw and Bawlake townships are being controlled by the Tatmadaw. Causing Tatmadaw to supply some of its troops with helicopters. The Kayan National Army was formed on 29 October, unifying many of the Karenni Resistance forces.

On 1 November, it was reported that Karenni resistance forces have been pushed back in Southern Shan state. With one reason given being the resistance forces running low on ammunition. Also Chinese drones are playing a part, with former counter-measures less effective in their combat and their able to carry bigger bomb loads. With the article mentioning that the Junta were in control of Loikaw as previously reported, but also its airport.

The Irrawaddy reported on 5 November that Tatmadaw was building up forces near Kayah State and in Loikaw for an offensive, possibly for the upcoming anniversary of Operation 1111. The aim might be to take more territory. With residents of Loikaw estimating the Tatmadaw forces there now numbering some 4,000 troops. While civilian farmers are suffering disruptions due to the ongoing situation in Northern Kayah and South Western Shan. With some outlets claiming the Junta taking vehicles from villagers, use of 'human shields' and forced conscription in Pekhon.

Fighting has now come to Demose Township, a township that has not seen much fighting since beginning of Operation 1111. While fighting Mobye Town, Pekhon-Pinlaung area and with large-scale artillery shelling. While a KNDF spokesperson said the Tatmadaw offensive might head towards Loikaw or to Nam Mae Khon, with the Tatmadaw's exact goals unclear to the KNDF. The fighting in the Karenni-Shan border area is a continuation of months of fighting there. In late November, a small detachment of 80 Junta troops heading for Loikaw from Mobye were attacked and suffered some 30 dead. At the same time-frame, fighting in Pekhon is causing displacement of Civilians. Including with Junta airstrikes on Pekhon. While the Irrawaddy reports Pekhon has been taken, unlike concurrent reports by Bni Online and KT News, which report fighting in Pekhon. The Frontier Myanmar also reported Pekhon was taken, but already in October. While the Irrawaddy reports major fighting in Mobye for control of the Pekon-Moebye-Loikaw road. With Mobye sitting in a 'critical junction'. Quoting a Pekhon PDF member saying "The regime has gathered around 500 troops in Pekon. It is trying to break through to the Battalion 422 base, backed by shelling from artillery units in Pekon and Loikaw,". While also stating fighting was occurring on the outskirts of Loikaw itself. With Nan Mae Khon being a goal of the Tatmadaws push. With Tatmadaw using drone strikes in Mobye. In early December, claims of chemical weapons use surface in fight for Mobye. By mid December, arrests and gunfire were reported from Loikaw. Bombardment in villages east of Pekhon Lake forces civilians to flee, despite this area not currently seeing fighting. While the PNO have been fighting in the townships of Pinlaung, Hsihseng, and Pekon.

In December, while all this fighting is going on, Pro-Junta sources report fears of a second push to take Loikaw by KNDF since Operation 1111 started. Stating fighting is occurring in 'Bawlakhe, Hpruso, Hpasawng, Demoso, Moebye, and Pekon' and estimating a battle for Loikaw is on the horizon for 2025. While around the New Year, Khun Be Du, chairperson of the Karenni National Defense Force (KNDF) said; "In 2025, we will strive to decisively take over the junta's camps in Kayah [Karenni] State. We call on the people to support and encourage us." In November, the Irrawaddy reported a military build-up in Loikaw of 4,000 troops. Since November, according to the Irrawaddy, both the Junta and the Pa-O National Army have been on the offensive to retake territory from the Karenni Resistance.

With late December civilians having fled from Mobye, Pekhon and Loikaw. Tatmadaw is seeing setbacks in their offensive against the Karenni, with the Mellyu base, Shadaw Township falling to the Karenni Army. The base had 80 troops. Kantarawaddy Times reported that from 1 February 2021 to 1 December 2024 there had been 1765 air strikes in Kayah State by the Junta, while in early January 2025 reports emerged that the Junta is supporting the Pa-O National Army offensive in the northern border area with airstrikes.

El Pais reports that Demoso has become a place for refugees to shelter. Housing some 150,000 people today. While it mentions fighting on the "Loikaw front". With KNDF General Maui stating, "Without enough weapons for a frontal assault, tactics and intelligence are everything in the outcome of the conflict. We must make sure that the army comes after us and falls in our trap." While Myanmar Peace Monitor reports Loikaw Prison was excluded from a recent amnesty issued by the Junta.

By mid-January, skirmishing was reported within the vicinity of Loikaw, with the brunt of the airstrikes being around Mobye. One killed and one wounded were reported in this fighting in Mobye by Karenni resistance. During this time Min Aung Hlaing stated in his opinion, the destruction now seen in Kayah state is the fault of the Karenni resistance.Towards the latter half of January, reports emerged of fighting on Loikaws outskits. This, while Tatmadaw wants to reopen the University of Loikaw. Locals interviewed stated this fighting was the reason they did not yet want to return to Loikaw.

==== Fight for control of Mobye ====
Tatmadaw has succeeded in taking Mobye, the town, during its offensive in December. Now as of early February, the KNDF launches an advance to retake the town. Tatmadaw reportedly took Mobye with 700 troops deployed to the task.

By middle February, 80% of the Historical Karenni State is estimated by the Democratic Voice of Burma as under resistance control. On February 17 Karenni Army is reported to have taken the last Tatmadaw outpost along the Kayah-Thai border. With said assault starting on 12 February with artillery and drone strikes on the 40 man strong Tatmadaw outpost. Reports of some Tatmadaw conscripts defecting to KNDF had emerged; "Most defectors are young men who were forcibly conscripted under the junta's military service law and sent to the frontlines." By February 22, more defections were reported and 'clashes' in Mobye.

Reports of Tatmadaw looting of homes are reported in Pekhon township, its town and villages. With intense fighting reported there.

Early March, reports of air and artillery strikes in Pekhon and Loikaw. "Heavy Clashes" reported in Mobye. While KNDF had announced it launched an offensive to retake Mobye from Tatmadaw, who had taken it in December. Junta is reported to have taken high casualties when taking the town. With KNDF now defending against a Junta bid to "Reclaim" Mobye from KNDF. The Junta is now sending reinforcements from Loikaw to help in this effort. Additional areas are mentioned, with the Irrawaddy citing an KNDF member saying: "Fighting has also broken out in [Karenni's] Loikaw, Hpasaung, and Bawlakhae townships over the past month, but Mobye has seen the heaviest clashes. The junta has suffered significant casualties, while we have also lost some comrades". Mobye is strategically located 40 km from Loikaw. In the city of Loikaw itself, the Junta is reported to be deploying the Peoples Militia to guard important sites. Such as Educational and Government buildings. Explaining "The People's Militia in Loikaw was formed after the 1111 Operation, and the majority of its members are local residents and junta supporters." Reporting on the recent fighting causes civilian casualties, due to artillery and air strikes. Drone strikes in the fight over Mobye reported, these drone strikes have forced the Karenni to withdraw from some defensive positions with both Tatmadaw and Karenni resistance having suffered "heavy casualties". Karenni have made inroads into Bawlakhe township recently, prompting the Junta to respond, lanching a battle for Bawlakhe. With also Demoso, Moebye and areas surrounding Loikaw also seeing some fighting. Claims of the Junta employing prisoners in their fight against the Karenni emerge.

My mid-March, Irrawaddy says "In Hpruso, Bawlake, Hpasawng, and Demoso, the regime has primarily resorted to defensive positions", leaving it unclear what kind of control this in practice means, is it the towns or just strategic points in the townships. With heavy fighting in Mobye and Pekhon. Irrawaddy is also reporting "heavy casualties" in this fighting. While DVB stated in mid-February, "The regime in Naypyidaw controls Loikaw, Bawlakhe, and Hpasawng."

Pa-O National Organization is said to participate in the fighting as fighting is ongoing along the Loikaw-Hsihseng road, incl. in Mobye.

==== Earthquake ====
The 2025 Myanmar earthquake affected residents, limiting their water access. However, combat also continued in the Kayah theatre with Junta airstrikes in Hrupso and Loikaw townships. While reportedly, some Karenni civilians initially confused the quake with airstrikes. This water crisis affecting some 100,000 people in Karenni held areas. In early April, it was reported that civilian recovery from the Earthquake had begun. However, this is largely with private efforts and donations. The KSIEC has promised it will provide support to civilians. In some parts of Karenni lands, food production is affected. This is still from the 2024 flooding, meaning there are multiple natural disasters affecting life in Karenni state.

==== Battles along roads north continues ====
Several villages are seeing combat along the Loikaw-Hsihseng road. Reporting Tatmadaw "has control of Loikaw, Bawlakhe and Hpasawng in Karenni, as well as the MOC 7 in Pekon town, southern Shan." This as of early April. BBC undercover journalist team report daily fighting in Mobye. With frontlines running some 100 meters from a military base in Mobye. 29 April, the Irrawaddy reported that on the 27th, a Tatmadaw unit of 100 troops advancing on Mobye from the north was attacked by KNDF. On the 28th, the Tatmadaw attempted to assault Mobye with 300 troops. With casualties amongst the Karenni resistance. The Irrawaddy states that the control of Mobye has been held by the Karenni resistance since 'early' 2025, but that the Tatmadaw is trying to retake it.

While for context, the status of Mobye til February 2025 from start of Operation 1111;

- At the outset of Operation 1111 the Junta controlled Mobye.
- Tatmadaw had lost Mobye by November 2024.
- Tatmadaw had retaken the Mobye town for a moment by late December 2024 which they then lost.
- Then by February it was back in Karenni hands.

Meanwhile Khun Bedu of KNDF has made a statement that the different resistance groups of Myanmar should cooperate to retake Lashio. Kantarawaddy Times reported on 6 May that 13 civilians have been killed and 20 wounded since the earthquake ceasefire was announced. Stating: "attacks took place in areas such as Bawlakhe and Mawchi in Karenni State, as well as in Pekon and Mobye along the Shan-Karenni border." KNU conducts attacks and takes military bases along the Thai Border, including in the Karenni border areas. Killed and wounded, incl. an PDF deputy battalion commander reported in Southern Shan. With fighting in several places, incl. Bawlakhe and Mobye. With PNO accused of extrajudicial killings of four PNLA members. 1,000 Junta and PNO troops were attacked by PDF troops in Nyaung Shwe Township, causing an unknown number of casualties. Bawlakhe town is seeing heavy fighting, with Karenni Army saying their goal is to take the town. 5 resistance fighters have died, including a deputy battalion commander. It was an ambush of Junta troops on the Loikaw to Loilinlay road. The Irrawaddy is also stating the Karenni have established a joint command to defend Mobye from Junta offensive and to conduct its offensive on Bawlakhe. Reports emerged 10 June that PNO has begun evicting people from villages in and around Hsihseng Township. Stating that The PNO also warned that it could not guarantee the safety of any villagers who do not leave their homes by 15 June. 8,000 civilians have to flee due to fighting in mid June in Pekon Township. The Junta and PNO offensive being cited as the cause. With heavy fighting over Mobye continuing, but also in the rest of the Township. The Shan Herald Agency for News stating KNDF controls Mobye, but junta is trying to retake it. With civilian life difficult in Southern Shan. Reporting "The 13 villages in eastern Pekon Township that villagers had to flee from are: Taungpoetkwe, Taungpoetgyi, Yaepu, Hpayartaung, Hsantswea, Hsantlate, Loipaw, Saungnankhe, Nangpawlong, Mahkayhkam, Lahei, Nyaungmun, and Konepaw." due to the mid-June fighting.

13 June, the Irrawaddy reported Junta troops entered Mobye, with heavy fighting there. While the Karenni have attacked the Battalion 1006. Quoting a resistance fighter, that Mobye is strategic, from there the Karenni can threaten Loikaw itself. The battle is also about the Junta's upcoming elections. Controlling the Mobye-Loikaw road would make it easier to arrange by the Junta. PNO has been advancing into Yawnghwe and Pinlaung townships, plus Eastern Pekon. Helped by Russian military-trained PNO units. With ammunition shortages being a cause for gradual withdrawal by the Karenni. The latest estimate is that 70% of Karenni state is now under resistance control. Casualties reported amongst fighting in Pekhon township. On 25 June, the Karenni launched an offensive near Mawchi town in Hpasawng township. Two resistance fighters were reported dead during 23–25 June in the battle for Moebye. A total of 40 civilian homes reportedly were set aflame during the same period in Pekhon township. Stating that Loikaw, Bawlakhe and Hpasawng remain under Tatmadaw control. Said burning of homes reported to have happened in Saung Nan Khae and being 50-60 houses burned.

==== Mobye changes hands ====
The Irrawaddy reports on July 3 that Mobye has fallen to the Tatmadaw. Tatmadaw was aided by Pa-o and Conscripts in this. Tatmadaw's goal is the Pinlaung-Mobye road's opening. Irrawaddy states, "Six Karenni towns and large rural areas of the state are resistance-held." While also reporting Tatmadaw setbacks in Hpasawng, saying a fighter jet had been shot down in the fighting. Fighting were still continuing while the Karenni is retreating. With a fighter describing artillery and air support making a defense difficult. While the Karenni failed to take Light Infantry Battalion 442 base in November 2024 when taking Mobye, the base is near the town. This base subsequently became a place to regroup for the Tatmadaw. A total of 40 defending Karenni lost their lives during early June to 3 July. Network Media Group, also reports that not every ward of Mobye has fallen and there is still fighting for what the Karenni still hold as of 3 July. The final offensive to take Mobye was launched on 29 June. With Irrawaddy saying Mobye fell on the 30th, Kantarawaddy News on 1 July and Network Media Group agreeing the town center having fallen but heavy fighting still ongoing in some remaining parts of the town while the Karenni being on the retreat. The Karenni capturing military bases in Hpasawng. DVB showing an photograph purported to show said downing of the fighter jet by the Karenni in the battle. While the Tatmadaw confirmed the fighter loss, but said its an training accident. Hpasawng has been under siege since February 2024, with two battalion bases now falling to the Karenni resistance. The Shan Herald Agency for News reports the Junta deployed thousands of troops to retake Mobye. On Tatmadaw's part, they declared victory over the Karenni on July 6. Claiming that the last parts of Mobye had been taken. Acknowledging "some" Tatmadaw killed and injured. Junta and Pa-O troops are advancing deeper into eastern Pekhon. The Irrawaddy reports that half of the troops that took Mobye from the Karenni were made up of conscripts. In July, after the fall of Mobye, it is being reported that farmland is now being left unharvested. This has led to 40,000 civilians fleeing their homes in Southern Shan. Martial law is being imposed in Karenni areas held by the Tatmadaw.

=== Fighting shifts ===
==== Siege of Hpasawng ====
Control of Hpasawng Township remains contested, with continued fighting reported.

As of July 17, the Siege of Hpasawng continues, which DVB reports began on June 25. With Bawlakhe and Demoso seeing no on-the-ground fighting, but is experiencing bombardment from the air by the Junta. In contrast, the Irrawaddy reports that Hpasawng has been under siege since February 2024, with two battalion bases now falling to the Karenni resistance.

A total of 25 people were killed in the deadliest one-strike airstrike so far in Kayah. This is in Mawchi, Hpasawang Township. Mawchi was taken in January 2024 from the Tatmadaw. The attack was targeted or hit near an hospital, civilian houses, an area near a primary school, and a shop providing paid access to a Starlink Wi-Fi connection. This attack took the form of two airstrikes. It happened on August 17, around 8:00 am. With the Network Media Group being able to verify two of the killed civilians, as of the dating of the report. The hospital hit located in the Lokalo Village while a kindergarten was hit in Hill 16 Ward. Dvb reports 22 killed and 17 wounded. Noting Mawchi has seen several airstrikes this year. On 19 August the death toll was reported to have risen to 32 with 7 still injured. Air attacks in the Hpasawng township have become a daily occurrence now.

As of September, the Karenni are trying to capture the LIB 135 military base in Hpasawng.

Airstrikes were reported in Mawchi in Late November 2025, with civilian deaths reported. Kantarawaddy Times reports that five civilians lost their lives in these airstrikes. As of December 2025, Tatmadaw only holds in Hpasawng Township, their Light Infantry Battalion (LIB) 135 military base, the rest of the township is controlled by Karenni forces.

In mid-February 2026, it was reported the siege of Hpasawng had been broken by Tatmadaw. The force sent to brake the siege was described as 'overwhelming'. Tatmadaw employed artillery and suicide drones to help break the siege. KNDF is restricting access to the Thanlwin River, which is located 3 km south of the town. Tatmadaw reportedly had dozens of clashes with the Karenni resistance. Tatmadaw are said to only control their camps and the vicinity of the town itself. With clearance operations still ongoing as of mid-February. With the main fighting for the Town taking place between February 12 and February 15. The town itself was captured by the Karenni resistance already in Late June 2025 but that the siege was on the Light Infantry Brigade 135's military base located in Hpasawng. The Than Lwin Bridge connecting Hpasawng and Mese across the Salween River were destroyed. DVB reports that Karenni forces re-entered the town of Hpasawng on February 17 and fighting for it is ongoing.

===== Push towards Mawchi =====
The Karenni blew up the Than Lwin Bridge 3 km south of Hpasawng. Residents accuse the Karenni resistance of also blowing up the Htuchaung Bridge. Since 15 February, fighting has been constantly ongoing in Hpasawng township, with the fighting moving towards Mawchi town. As of early March, the force who relieved the siege of Hpasawng numbered 1,000. Now 200 more troops are reinforcing this force from Myanmar's capital. The Karenni have lost trade routes to Thailand due to the fighting related to Hpasawng. Fighting was occurring daily now. Mawchi is strategically important to the Karenni because it contains mines that finance much of their war effort. The Karenni resistance expects Tatmadaw to push towards Mawchi and attempt to take it next. Salween Bridge, Htoo Chaung Bridge, and Pon Chaung Bridge are reportedly destroyed. In early April air strikes were conducted in Mawchi by Tatmadaw. It was reported that Tatmadaw has attempted to advance onto Mawchi during April 2026, incl conducting drone strikes in the area. However, noting that bo major fighting has occurred beyond small skirmishes, drone strikes and such.

==== Hrupso Township buildup ====
There is apparently a build-up in Hrupso town of Tatmadaw troops. 500 troops are reportedly advancing both west and east of the town. With fighting around these. On March 5, there was an attempted "backhoe" advance by Tatmadaw, which got ambushed by the KNDF. Another ambush was organized in Nanpe. Demawso–Hpruso–Bawlakhe road is seeing frequent clashes as well. In May 2026 it was reported that Tatmadaw burned down an IDP camp forcing 1,000 civilians to flee. With Network Media Group saying "Locals reported that troops from the junta’s Light Infantry Battalions 531 and 428, as well as MATD 14 in Hpruso Township, have been moving more frequently around surrounding villages in recent days." In early June 2026 it was reported that on 28 March 16 homes got burned in Bukhu village, 60 homes in Htarleh village on 6 May and the next day on the 7th Prehtaw village 4 more houses got burnt.

==== Situation in nearby Bawlakhe ====
In February, there was combat for the Bawlakhe town, and Karenni advised civilians not to return. Now Tatmadaw is asking refugees to return in order for them to be able to part-take in the upcoming elections. Despite this situation between the Karenni fighters and Tatmadaw, many civilians still remain in the town. Some fighting as spread to Bawlakhe from Demoso direction. Kantarawaddy Times reports the Regime in preparing an force of a 1,000 troops to push towards Bawlakhe. Fighting along the Union road reported during November on the Loikaw to Bawlakhe section. Including near Nanphe village and Maesalaung Mountain, Bawlakhe. With fighting near Hrupso also reported. In February 2026, Bawlakhe was listed as controlled by Tatmadaw. In February 2026, Tatmadaw is reportedly advancing toward Hpruso and Bawlakhe.

==== Pinlaung to Loikaw Axis ====
Villages around Mobye town is still held by Karenni resistance. While Loikaw City is under Tatmadaw control, the surroundings in the Loikaw township are in resistance hands. Hpayarni and Hmonpyar are reportedly "torched" as the Tatmadaw tries to gain full control of the Pinlaung to Pekon to Mobye to Loikaw road. Hpayarni and Dawhso-kle in Loikaw Township are seeing 'heavy fighting'. With fears lingering that Tatmadaw and their Pa-O allies might next attack out of Mobye and Loikaw.

As of 7 August, the Tatmadaw has begun flooding farmland by releasing water from the Mobye Dam.

By later half of August, Fighting in Pehkon Township for its control was reported, incl. around Pekhon Lake, 10,000 civilians displaced in the fighting. By end of August, PNO is claimed to be extorting large sums of money from returning refugees Nyaungshwe Township.

By the first half of September, more than 30,000 civilians were displaced in Pekhon township due to fighting there. With more than 250,000 displaced in the Karenni-held areas. Fighting reported in Eastern Loikaw Township during November. Displacing ~1,000 people as the Junta pushes east.

===== Focus on Pehkon and Bawyan =====
As of the second half of September, PNO and Tatmadaw troops have made advancements in Pehkon Township. With the offensive against the Karenni started during the second week of September. Civilians are fleeing from five villages in the area. As of early October, Pekhon township is seeing fighting, PNO and Tatmadaw troops are advancing and taking ground in the township. After brief clashes between the Junta & PNO milita and Karenni defenders, the Junta and PNO militia enter and burn houses in Bawyan Village, Pekon Township. These clashes in Bawyan and Salone have caused thousands to become refugees. Pa-O National Defence Force is helping the refugees evacuate.

Heavy fighting erupts in Pehkon township in early November. Bawyan Village is seeing heavy fighting, Tatmadaw and the PNO is attacking. With killed and wounded reported on all sides, incl. civilians. Artillery and drone strikes were used in the battle. At the same time its reported that Tatmadaw and PNO forces are attempting to retake both Pekon and Pinlaung towns, displacing further civilians. Trying to expand the zone of control further out from Mobye. With establishing control over the Pinlaung-Loikaw road as another goal as well. By late November, shelling of civilians reported. "Fierce clashes" is reported in Bawyan village of Pekhon. With fighting going on in 3–4 days at a time and causing houses to take fire. With combat related casualties reported for both fighting parties. Kantarawaddy times describe a 'fierce battle' taking place here in their November report. Involving places in Pekhon and Pinlaung Townships.

Shan Herald Agency for News reports that on 6 December the Karenni coalition launches an counter-offensive in the Pekon Township, around Salong, lasting til 8 December. Both sides had casualties and fighting was described as "really intense". With fighting occurring in the Bawyan, Salong North and Salong South villages. Tatmadaw being reported to have used Artillery and Drones. During the second week of September, Tatmadaw had managed to enter these three villages and were now ejected. On 19 December, reports emerged that PNO and Tatmadaw were setting fire to Salong North and South villages for a second time this year. Tatmadaw is said to have deployed between these villages and used this tactic to try to clear the villages of Karenni resistance amid fighting. With almost daily fighting. In a report about December 2025, at least 36 civilian homes were reportedly burned and fighting in Pekhon Township. Citing civilians interviewed, it was not clear if these were burned intentionally or as a result of fighting.

In January 2026, fighting was reported in village tracts such as Htee Pa Dar, Htit Kel, Tee Lon and Ko Nan, where local residents as well as displaced people have taken refuge.

In February 2026, fighting was reported in La Maung La and Lway Yin Mingalar villages.

Shelling of civilians was reported, with 4 dead.

===== Area around the Loiyin mountain =====
In March, a military force of Pno and Tatmadaw is advancing on villages near Mobye, forcing civilians to flee. Towards the Liwo villages at the foothills of Loiyin mountain. With Saung Phalan having been bombarded as well. This is affecting some ~~1,000 civilians.

===== Creation of Alpha Military Region =====
In late April it was announced the different resistance groups in the Karenni-Shan border area have united into "No. 1 Alpha Military Region-Mobye". With the area of operation describes by an source as "Resistance forces within the No. 1 Alpha Military Region-Mobye have been active across key towns along the Shan–Karenni border—including Pekon, Mobye, Pinlaung, and Pawnglawng—with operations extending westward to the outskirts of the capital, Naypyidaw".

This new military region is under the command of the Minister of Defense of the KSIEC

===== Fighting continues around Mobye =====
In mid-May fighting was reported around Mobye forcing civilians to flee. Drone recon followed by artillery strikes as well reported with negative effects on rice cultivation.

==== Demoso ====
The Irrawaddy reports that on 19 August 2025, the Tatmadaw claims to have captured Demoso. Demoso was captured by the Karenni during offensive in November 2023. The Karenni still hold strategic ground in the Township itself and battle is ongoing for Nanmekhon town. AP news reports that the Tatmadaw launches a 16-day operation to take the town. Saying that photos of soldiers who recaptured the town were taken from in front of the hospital, fire department, and town hall and published in the military government's newspapers. DVB reports in the 16 days of fighting, that started on 4 August, Demoso fell on the 19th. With at least six dead resistance fighters, whose bodies have been recovered. With the Junta admitting casualties as well, but refusing to state how many. On 10 August KNDF announced they were closing the Hpruso–Demoso road. Myanmar now says the town of Demoso has changed hands but much of Demoso township is still in Karenni hands. While Karenni resistance denies the Junta has taken 'full control' of the town and says there is still fierce fighting ongoing for the control of the town. Admitting however, that the centre of the town has been taken by Tatmadaw from the Karenni. The Junta is currently deploying 300 troops to take the Dawngankhar Village of Demoso town. With the Tatmadaw deploying heavy artillery, airstrikes, battle tanks and drones. Demoso has also become a refugee hub for those fleeing war, many of whom now have to flee again. KNDF is urging people to avoid the Loikaw-Demoso-Hpruso Highway. This battle is part of the still ongoing Operation Yan Naing Min, with the latest offensives also being part of this operation on the Tatmadaw side. By the end of August, reports of fighting in Ngwetaung village, Demoso township, were raging. 15 Tatmadaw reported dead. Also, only half of Demoso town is said to be under Tatmadaw control, with Karenni still saying the contest is ongoing for the town. A fight for control over the Demoso-Hpruso road is reported. Tatmadaw is said to want to use Demoso to supply its forces in Hpruso Township, as well as in Bawlakhe Township. As of early September, despite claims of fighting by the Karenni resistance, many news agencies still list Demoso in Tatmadaw hands. With 106 civilians reported killed since January alone. Kantarawaddy reports fighting 'in and around' Demoso. Incl. that Junta troops have now reach the Hpruso Township border. With serious impacts on refugees who now are again on the road. Arbitrary executions of two civilians reported to have taken place on the 8th by Tatmadaw Padawdu village. With KNDF claiming they have drone footage of Tatmadaw employing human shield tactics on the 18th of August.

===== Fighting in the Demoso Township =====
As of the first half of September, artillery shelling kills civilians. An airstrike on a church in Western Demoso.

By late September, it was reported that fighting had continued in Demoso township intensively and now also spread to Hrupso and Bawlakhe townships. With fighting in Dawngankhar and Ngwetaungywarthit villages. Pointing out that the clashes in these other townships aren't as intense as in Demoso township. Tatmadaw has 150 troops stationed in Dawngankhar and is using it to launch attacks from. Civilian suffering is reported as a result of this fighting. The area around Demoso-Hpruso Road is being contested. The junta is attempting to advance towards Bawlakhe. KNDF has announced the closure of the Hpruso-Htarle-Nanhpe Road due to the fighting, as reported by Network Media Group.

Kantarawaddy Times reports in early October, in a summary for September, that ongoing fighting had been seen in the Daw Ngan Khar quarter. As of early October, Demoso and Hrupso townships are seeing fighting.

Fighting continues as of early November, with civilians harvesting food being targeted by airstrikes and artillery. As of late November, frequent fighting and troop movements are causing 50% price hikes in food as delivering food becomes more difficult logistically. During November, Junta columns that embarked from Loikaw in July have now reached Khopalot village and are near Ngamyung village. Advances ongoing towards Nanmekhon. Frequent clashes are reported. These advances are significant because they are getting dangerously close to places where displaced civilians are holding up in difficult situations. Airstrikes occur in Western Demoso despite no clashes on the ground. In mid January, drone and heavy weapons strikes were reported in Demoso township, hitting an church.

In mid April it was reported that Tatmadaw was artillerying civilians attempting to return to plant food.

==== PNLA areas ====
Fighting erupts in January 2026 for the control of Kadugyi. With Tatmadaw and PNO launching an offensive against PNLA. According to PNLA the Tatmadaw-PNO offensive is intended to enter Shadaw Township in Karenni State. Shadaw potentially being the goal. Fighting has continued in Kadugyi, with the village of Chinn Hnin said to have been entirely burned down according to villagers who fled from the area. In February 2026, Ban Mat Ywar Thit village was burned in Kadugyi. In 2023, the village was created for refugee civilians in Mawkmai Township. Populated by ~100 people.

==== Mese Township ====
January 2026 80 Tatmadaw soldiers broke out of a prison in Mese. The Thai Army returns 68 of the escaped 81 inmates to the Junta from the prison in Mese. With 13 inmates having been recaptured by the Karenni resistance. In March, 5 were killed in an air strike and 20 were injured at the detention center. The junta troops bombed were troops from fighting in Hpasawng and their families. While there are no fights ongoing atm in Mese.

=== Lull in Fighting ===
By May 2026, there was very little fighting reported and much of it in the early part of the month. In early June 2026 airstrikes on civilians occurred, killing one man. Despite no fighting between the forces on the ground occurring in Western Demoso.

== Post-fighting ==
In early March it was reported that most homes of those who fled the fighting had been looted in Loikaw. There were also reports of trials of Loikaw University personnel for having colluded with the regime, including Loikaw University Rector U Aung Khin Myint. Karenni State Interim Executive Council has begun to consolidate control over parts of Kayah State. In January 2025 it was reported that the new interim government had begun collecting taxes at the township level. By July 2024, it was reported that an anti-junta law enforcement agency, the Karenni State Police, was attempting to deal with sex crimes. A total of 365 cases of war-related sexual violence have been documented by the Women's League of Burma in Karenni State, by mid 2025 since the coup start.

As of January 2025, the local Military council have started issuing confiscation threats for vacant homes. While gender based violence has been brought to the attention of Karenni State Interim Executive Council.

The KSIEC has begun to issue residency cards to its citizens.

Due to gambling crackdowns elsewhere in Myanmar, part of the gambling business is shifting to the southern Shan.

DVB, in an interview with Khun Bedu, said the KSIEC has built up a civilian administration, with departments for "youth, education, health, economy, and more." Stating also that they are aiming to hold elections in 2026 and have conducted a population census, with taking Loikaw not being a prerequisite for elections.

In May 2025, counterfeit cash is reportedly on the rise in Karenni State. The Junta and the people's militia is cracking down on unlicenced vehicle owners in Tatmadaw-held Loikaw as of June 2025. Resistance-held Karenni areas are suffering severe fuel shortages and the KSIEC is promising a crackdown on price gouging. In July 2025, the Tatmadaw is allowing residents to return to areas of Loikaw, previously inaccessible to them. They report having to pay 50,000 kyats for mine clearing in the wards, without any sign of there having been any mine clearing or mines. With looting also reported.

In October 2025, Marwi, the deputy commander-in-chief of KNDF, called for a United Karenni State Army. Its goal would be to unify all Karenni armed groups into one army.

In late October, Tatmadaw is announcing elections will be held in four townships of Karenni State, Demoso, Hpruso, Bawlakhe and Loikaw Townships. With opposition calling for boycotts. Violence against civilians, including sexual violence was reported in November 2025 around Karenni State. Including an incident involving the PDF, the claimed assault was performed by Duwon, quartermaster general of the Naypyitaw PDF, the victim a friend of his wife, who then filed complaints with the National Unity Government (NUG). The victing being beaten by General Duwon.

=== Elections 2026 ===
Residents of Loikaw and other places under regime control are being pressured against their will to vote in the upcoming elections organized by the junta. While opposition and resistance groups are strongly condemning this election and the Karenni candidates partaking in it and its conduct as a sham election. The Election Commission has scheduled elections in Loikaw, Bawlakhe, Demoso,. and Hpruso townships, which are under regime control. Mese, Shadaw and Hpasawng townships will not host the elections since they are under the control of Karenni resistance forces. Karenni State has a total of seven townships.

A burst of attacks was reported on Election Day in the city of Loikaw, at some polling stations, amid reports of forced voting under Tatmadaw supervision. Fighting was taking place in Demoso and Hpruso townships, which were voting in the second round.

=== Opium cultivation ===
Opium cultivation is growing in Karenni-administered areas. KSIEC has vowed to clamp down on this cultivation.

=== Fuel & water crisis ===
The Karenni area is suffering from fuel shortages and fuel price increases due to the Iran War. The Junta is regulating water, fuel, and electricity consumption. This crisis puts pressure on a situation already dire due to the war. The water crisis is hitting war refugees hard and the situation is dire. The fuel prices are making this water crisis worse. Because water has dried up water must be fetched from elsewhere requiring fuel.

== Humanitarian impact ==
Since the start of the operation, more than 80% of the state's population has been internally displaced. The group Progressive Karenni People reported that the junta had destroyed "46 religious buildings, 22 schools, 14 hospitals and 2,281 homes" in the state since 1 January 2024. Ko Banyar reported that more than 500 people have been killed in the shelling.

In a UN statement released in August 2024, it stated that the level of brutality had increased, including an increase of aerial bombardment, including on children by the Tatmadaw and beheadings of surrendered soldiers in Loikaw by resistance fighters. The UN says the increase in bombardment of civilian targets by the Tatmadaw is a sign of increased desperation amongst the Junta. Demoso has become a refugee hub. Refugees in Demoso are suffering from water shortages and are dependent on charity for their water needs. IDPs are demanding that the Interim Executive Council do more to help.

In April 2025, it was reported that the food situation had begun to get worse in Kayah. KSIEC is calling for humanitarian assistance for 40,000 of its citizens as of June 2025.

=== Famine warfare ===
As of October 2025, Tatmadaw is being accused of 'famine warfare' by the Karenni. The offensive by the Tatmadaw has caused severe food shortage and hunger. With an total of 250,000 people diplaced within the Kayah State. With people asking for emergency food aid. Heading into 2026, KSIEC estimates there are 36,000 acres of farmland able to produce food. With 2025 seeing 5,200 acres wiped out alone, due to both natural disasters and warfare. There are fears of food insecurity for 2026. In May 2026 the Karenni Human Rights Group issued warnings were issued of impending famine and that this is the result of systemic Tatmadaw attacks on food production.

== Aftermath ==
In an interview of Khun Bedu, he states the push-back of the Karenni positions after the Tatmadaw's counter-Operation were due to ammunition shortages, superior drone technology by Tatmadaw and conscription employed by Tatmadaw and its allies. However going on to also state that "No Karenni force had ever gotten this far before" when considering their success in taking parts of Loikaw and other Karenni areas. While Pro-government sources has framed their successes as bringing peace, stability, and development to the state. Framing their operation as 'counter-terrorism operation codenamed "Yan Naing Min"' and painting their enemies as terrorists. Also while painting themselves as victims of an onslaught when they lost many towns and parts of Loikaw at the height before their counter-operation. The Asia Sentinel credits Tatmadaws counter-offensives success in Myanmar to "bolstered by new recruits, advanced drone warfare, and more decentralized military tactical operations" and that "Perhaps one of the most notable reversals of fortune has been in Kayah State and Southern Shan State, where multiple Ethnic Armed Organizations (EAOs) have lost territory over the past year to methodical army advances."
