= Operation 1107 =

2023 rebel military operation in Myanmar

- Part of the Myanmar civil war
Date	7 November 2023 – present (2 years, 3 months, 3 weeks and 3 days)
Location	Kayah State; Bago Region
Status	Ongoing
Territorial changes	Anti-junta controlled areas in Kayah State grow to 80%, including Mese

Belligerents
Tatmadaw	Various Karenni EAOs and PDFs

Commanders and leaders
	Tun Kyaw; Khu Oo Reh; Khun Bedu

Units involved
Tatmadaw: Myanmar Army; Eastern Command; Myanmar Air Force; Myanmar Police Force; Border Guard Forces	Karenni EAOs: Karenni National People's Liberation Front; Karenni Army; Karenni Nationalities Defence Force; Karenni Revolution Union; Other anti-junta forces: People's Defence Force

Strength
Unknown	Unknown

Casualties and losses
70+ killed 38 captured	4 killed
- 34+ civilians killed, 50 injured 280,000 civilians displaced

Operation 1107 (Burmese: ၁၁၀၇ စစ်ဆင်ရေး) is an ongoing joint military operation launched on 7 November 2023, by the Karenni National People's Liberation Front, Karenni Army, and Karenni Nationalities Defence Force against the Tatmadaw military junta in Myanmar, during the Myanmar civil war. It was launched in support of the concurrent Operation 1027 by other rebel forces in Myanmar. It has since been subsumed into the scope of Operation 1111.

== Timeline ==
=== November ===
It began on 7 November 2023, with junta border posts in Mese Township, Kayah State (including Pantein) being seized by Karenni forces. Many weapons were seized by the rebels. 70 junta soldiers were said to have been killed in the attack, while Karenni forces claimed to have incurred four dead. Starting from 4:00 AM on the 11th, KNDF and KA forces started attacking military bases around Loikaw in an operation dubbed "Operation 11.11". The coalition forces captured seven military bases and shot down an aircraft.

The KNDF claimed responsibility for the junta K-8W trainer/attack aircraft which crashed in a combat zone near Loikaw, the capital of Kayah State. However, the Tatmadaw claimed the aircraft suffered a technical problem. A junta source stated that it was unclear if it crashed from enemy fire or from technical failure.

=== December ===
In addition to Loikaw mentioned above, fighting has been reported in Demoso and Mobye. It was also stated that this fighting has strategically prevented Tatmadaw from sending reinforcements from Kayah State to Shan state, where Operation 1027 is ongoing. Not only that but also forced it to defend Loikaw and thus left some other areas around it lightly defended.

KNLA also began fighting for Kyaukkyi Township in the Bago Region joined by the Bago PDF. This was a significant development because the township lies outside of Kayah State. On 4 December, KNLA and local PDF units captured the town of Mone in Kyaukkyi Township, marking the first capture of a settlement in Bago Region.

On the 5th, there were reports of initial progress in the Bago region and that 1,500 fighters were involved against Tatmadaw.

On the 9th, Pyu Township was also reported to be under attack by insurgents. Pekon Township that neighbors Kayah State, but is in Shan State is also seeing fighting, with Demoso and Loikaw continuing seeing combat.

On 13 December, reports emerged of insurgents making some initial progress in Pyu Township, where they seized positions along the Yangon-Naypyitaw-Mandalay highway, which is located a few kilometers from the strategically important Yangon-Naypyitaw-Mandalay Expressway. Pyu township is also important due to its close proximity to the capital city Naypyitaw. Involved in this push are the local PDF units as well as KNU, Bamar People's Liberation Army and KNLA. Fighting in Kyaukkyi Township also continues.

As of 15 December, fighting in Mobye is continuing, the insurgents claim to have taken 75% of the town. At least 5 civilians where reported to have been killed as a result of the fighting, with much of the town abandoned by the civilians. The casualties of fighting in Mobye include 11 Tatmadaw and 9 Insurgents soldiers killed.

=== January ===
Fighting has been continuing in Demoso as well as the surrounding countryside. Such as in Moso, Hpruso. Al Jazeera reported that this fighting in Moso was linked to a supply road used by the resistance, with Tatmadaw trying to disrupt its use.

== Operation 1107 becoming subsumed into Operation 1111 ==
The first Karenni concurrent operation that was announced were Operation 1107, with fighting reported in places like Mese outside Loikaw. Shortly afterwards, in November 2023, Operation 1111 was announced for Loikaw.

However, most of the media outlets have now started to utilize the term Operation 1111 universally for all Kayah related fighting. This is not to say that the Operation 1107 is still not ongoing or has ended, just that the term has fallen out of use in-favour of Operation 1111 amongst many of the source material. Including pro-Tatmadaw media, using Operation 1111 alongside the generic term "terrorists". The term 'Operation 1111' is still being used, despite changes on the battlefields, such as Loikaw now being controlled by Tatmadaw.

== See also ==
- Battle of Mese
- Operation 1027
- Operation 1111
- Mo So massacre
