= Kayah State Special Region 3 =

Kayah State Special Region 3 New Kayah State
- Special region
- Flag
- Country: Myanmar
- No. of townships: 5
- Formation of the KSSR-3: 26 July 1994
- Capital: Seebu

Government
  - President: Than Soe Naing

Area
  - Total: 900 km^{2} (350 sq mi)
- Time zone: UTC+6:30 (MMT)

Kayah State Special Region 3, sometimes referred to as "New Kayah State", is a special region in eastern Myanmar governed by the Kayan New Land Party (KNLP). It covers ~200 villages in 5 townships; Demoso, Pekon, Pinlaung, Thandaunggyi, and Pyinmana Townships. The region is mainly ethnically Kayan. It was established in 1994 after the KNLP signed a ceasefire with the ruling State Peace and Development Council regime of Myanmar. The KNLP has since had strained relations with the Burmese Tatmadaw, but the KSSR-3 is typically left out of conflict.

The KSSR-3 is the third special region established in Kayah State, alongside KSSR-1 (administered by the Kayan National Guard) and KSSR-2 (formerly administered by Karenni National People's Liberation Front; dissolved when the KNPLF defected to anti-Tatmadaw resistance).
