= Pekon clashes =

2023 attacks during the Myanmar civil war

Pekon Clashes
- Part of the Karenni theater in the Myanmar civil war
Date	May 24, 2021 – present (4 years, 9 months and 1 week)
Location	Pekon Township, Taunggyi District, Myanmar
Status	Ongoing

Belligerents
State Administration Council; Pyusawhti militias	People's Defence Force Karenni Nationalities Defence Force Karen National Liberation Army

Casualties and losses
Unknown	Unknown
- As of May 12, 2024: At least 10,000 refugees

The Pekon clashes are a series of engagements between the Myanmar SAC junta and anti-coup factions in Pekon Township, Shan State.

Three months after the military coup, Karen militias raided and occupied a police station in Mobye.

In July 2022, the KNDF targeted an unnamed EAO due to the mistaken belief it was delivering food to the Tatmadaw.

In late December 2023, various resistance groups of Operation 1111 were able to capture two junta military bases, Shwe Pyi Aye and Lwal Pator, in the township.
