= Battle of Mese =

2023 Battle in Myanmar Civil War

- Part of the Myanmar civil war (2021–present)
Date	February 19 – June 14, 2023 (3 months, 3 weeks and 5 days)
Location	Mese, Kayah State, Myanmar 18.641423°N 97.654519°E
Result	Anti-junta forces victory
Territorial changes	Military bases in Mese captured by rebels; The town is deserted

Belligerents
State Administration Council	Karenni Nationalities Defence Force; Karenni National Progressive Party; People's Defence Force; Progressive Karenni People's Force; Karenni National People's Liberation Front; Karen National Liberation Army

Commanders and leaders
	Colonel Phone Naing

Units involved
Tatmadaw; Myanmar Army; Light Infantry Battalion 135; Light Infantry Battalion 430; Myanmar Police Force	KNPP: Karenni Army; Karenni Commando Force

Strength
20 soldiers 10 police officers	Unknown

Casualties and losses
- 4,000 people displaced

The Battle of Mese took place during the first half of 2023 for control of Mese Township on the border between Myanmar and Thailand in Kayah State. The battle was a part of the current Myanmar civil war.

== Battle ==
On 19 February 2023, Karenni Ethnic Armed Organisations (EAOs) ambushed a column of 30 soldiers in Mese Township. They reported to have killed six soldiers, captured five while 10 managed to flee. Firearms and ammunition were seized. In late May 2023 it was reported that junta forces struggled to bring supplies to the base in Mese.

On 13 June 2023, at around 5 a.m., anti-junta forces launched attack at Mese police station and nearby military bases. After capturing the bases they entered the town and raided a local police station where 10 police officers were stationed. In a base near Taung Hla village, the forces captured two 120mm artillery guns. The other two outposts were located in Mei La Nwe village and at Milestone 14 on the Thai-Myanmar border. A total of 40 rifles were seized according to a Karenni Nationalities Defence Force (KNDF) spokesperson. The township's chief of police was killed in the attack. Following the attack junta forces launched six airstrikes between 10am on 13 June and 1am on 14 June. 3,000 civilians from Mese and nearby refugee camp were forced to flee. The anti-junta forces had to withdraw from the town itself but remained on local hills.

Two units of the Karenni National People's Liberation Front, which were previously aligned with the junta, switched sides to join the attack on Mese.

Seven junta soldiers from the captured camps fled to Thailand following the clashes. Aerial bombings of the area reportedly continued on 15 June. On 18 June, the junta sent hundreds of soldiers from Demoso in preparation to recapture Mese. On 23 June, Karenni forces reported the capture of another armed base in the Mese township.
