= Mese, Myanmar =

Town in Kayah State, Myanmar

Mese မယ်စဲ့မြို့
- Location in Myanmar
- Coordinates: 18°38′N 97°40′E
- Country: Myanmar
- Division: Kayah State
- District: Mese District
- Township: Mese Township
- Time zone: UTC+6:30 (MMT)

Mese (Burmese: မယ်စဲ့မြို့) is the capital of Mese District in southeastern Kayah State, Myanmar.

== History ==
On April 30, 2022, new districts were expanded and organized. Mese became the capital of its own district, separating out of Bawlakhe District.

In 2023, it was the site of a battle which led to the town's capture by anti-Tatmadaw force, the Karenni National People's Liberation Front, who had previously been one of the junta's Border Guard Forces but had openly defected, began attacking Burmese military positions and joined forces with the Karenni Army, KNDF, KNLA, and PDF. The combined forces took over Mese Township and the town, becoming one of the first district-level towns to fall to anti-junta forces.
