= 4K Coalition =

Military alliance in Myanmar

- 4Kမဟာမိတ်တပ်ဖွဲ့
- Dates active: 13 June 2023 – present
- Groups: Karen National Liberation Army; Karenni Army; Karenni National People's Liberation Front; Karenni Nationalities Defence Force
- Active regions: Karenni State; Kayin State; Shan State; Myanmar-Thailand border
- Ideology: Ethnic nationalism Ethnic separatism Federalism
- Wars: the internal conflict in Myanmar

The 4K Coalition is an alliance of Karen and Karenni EAOs. Formed in June 2023, it consists of: Karen National Liberation Army, Karenni National People's Liberation Front, Karenni Army, and Karenni Nationalities Defence Force.
