= Federalism in Myanmar =

Official Political Ideology of the SCEF

Federalism is the official political ideology of the Steering Council for the Emergence of a Federal Democratic Union, the most prominent political and military alliance formed by the Kachin Independence Organisation, the Karenni State Interim Executive Council, the Karen National Union, the Chin National Front, the Sagaing Federal Unit, the Magway Federal Unit, the Mandalay Federal Unit, National Unity Government of Myanmar and the Committee Representing Pyidaungsu Hluttaw.

== See also ==
- Ethnic federalism – Form of federalism
