= KNDP =

KNDP may refer to:

- Kamerun National Democratic Party
- Kayan New Land Party, in Burma
