= Kayan New Land Party =

Myanmar political party

- ကယန်းပြည်သစ်ပါတီ
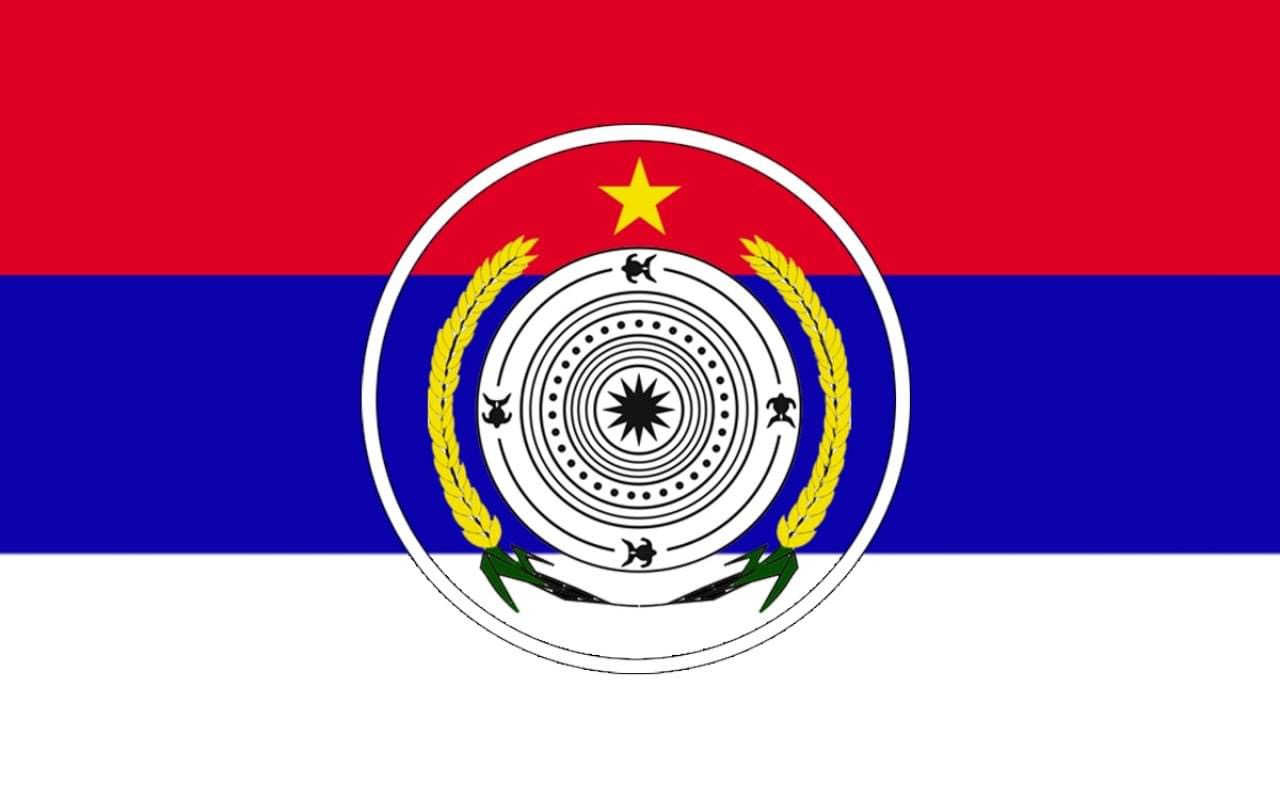
- Flags of the Kayan New Land Party and Kayan New Land Army
- Founder: Shwe Aye
- Leader: Than Soe Naing
- Dates active: August 8, 1964 – present
- Headquarters: Seebu, Pekon Township, Shan State
- Active regions: Demoso Township; Pekon Township; Pinlaung Township; Thandaunggyi Township; Pyinmana Township
- Ideology: Federalism; Democracy; Minority rights Maoism
- Size: 1,000
- Wars: Internal conflict in Myanmar
- Website: KNLP Facebook page

The Kayan New Land Party (Burmese: ကယန်းပြည်သစ်ပါတီ, abbreviated: KNLP) is a political party in Myanmar. Its armed wing is Kayan New Land Army.

== History ==
=== Early days of KNLP ===
==== Background ====
The Ne Win government, which was established in a coup in 1962, advocated Burmese Way to Socialism and promoted hard-line policies. In 1963, the Anti-dam construction Committee was established in Pekong Township by local leaders. In May 1964, the Ne Win government demonetised the 50 kyats and 100 kyats without prior notice.

==== Start of armed struggle ====
On 4 June 1964, villagers from Pekong township rebelled against the Ne Win government and attacked a military outpost. The first armed group was organised by Bo Pyan, who led the anti-Japanese struggle, but Shwe Aye, a former Rangoon University student, joined him and formed the Kayan New Land Party on 8 August that year.

Lintner (1994) describes that the armed struggle in 1964 occurred after the demonetisation of high-value banknotes by the government, but some reports suggest that the establishment of the KNLP in the same year was in response to the anti-dam movement.

South (2020) also states that the KNLP decided to launch an armed struggle for religious freedom following the expulsion of all foreign missionaries, including Roman Catholic missionaries, from Myanmar.

=== Alliance with CPB ===
Initially, the KNLP cooperated with the Karenni National Progressive Party and joined the National Democratic Front (NDF) in 1976, but left the NDF in 1977 to align with the Communist Party of Burma. In 1979, the KNLP formed an alliance with CPB, as the areas it controlled were far from the border and foreign support was not forthcoming. It also had a joint struggle relationship with the Shan State Nationalities Liberation Organisation (SSNLO), a left-wing Pa-O army, and the Karenni National People's Liberation Front (KNPLF), a left-wing offshoot of KNPP.

When CPB collapsed in 1989, divisions arose from within the KNLP: in 1991, the Kayan National Guard (KNG) split from the KNLP with about 60 troops and negotiated a ceasefire with the military regime. On 20 June of the same year, the KNLP rejoined the NDF.

=== After the ceasefire ===
On 26 July 1994, after losing its alliance partner, the KNLP negotiated a ceasefire with the military regime and was granted autonomy for the areas it controlled as Kayah State Special Region 3. It was also granted concessions for timber harvesting and mining development.

However, relations between the KNLP and the military regime were not stable, and in a document leaked to WikiLeaks, the US Embassy in Rangoon described the relationship as 'hot and cold relation with the SPDC'.

In 2005, a militia supported by the national army was created within KNLP-controlled areas, and the KNLP was forced to withdraw after clashes.

After the ceasefire, the KNLP worked closely with the national army and became more like a militia. In 2009, the military regime pressured the KNLP to convert to a Border Guard Force (BGF) or militia, as under the 2008 Constitution, all military organisations must be under the control of Tatmadaw. SPDC claimed that the KNLP had converted to the militia in November 2009, but the KNLP denied this.

Initially, the KNLP was considered as one of 'dialogue partners' by the government and was invited to the National Convention, but later was excluded from the Nationwide Ceasefire Agreement and the Union Peace Conference – 21st Century Panglong .

The KNLP was one of 12 ethnic EAOs that participated in the Panghsang Conference organised by the United Wa State Army in November 2015.

=== Post-coup era ===
After the 2021 Myanmar coup, the KNLP secretly cooperated with the resistance by training them. The party also pressured the government to release the arrested for protesters, and got them released.

In May 2021, the KNLP and the People’s Defence Force clashed with the Tatmadaw in the southern Shan State village of Soung Nan Khe. According to The Irrawaddy, it was a KNLP non-commissioned officer who joined the resistance and clashed with the Tatmadaw, and in June of the same year, the KNLP jointly with the Karenni National People's Liberation Front and the Karenni National Peace and Development Party (both two forces have converted to BGF), under the name of the Karenni Nationalities Defence Force (KNDF) declared ceasefire with the Tatmadaw although it was quickly rejected by the KNDF and the KNDF resumed fighting the Tatmadaw not long after.

In March 2022, like other militia groups, it still has close relations with Myanmar military, as the party was provided with weapons by them. However, several KNLP garrisons were targeted by the Myanmar military's aerial bombing runs. On the contrary, there were also reports of KNLP obstructing resistance forces from attacking Myanmar military positions.

On 6 August 2024, the KNLP-led Kayan National Education Committee established Kayan National University. KNU was established in an anti-junta controlled zone of the Kayan Region to promote Kayan culture in postsecondary education. Initially offering Teacher Training, Agriculture, Healthcare, Development and Social Science, Computer Science, and Kayan Literature and Languages, KNU will eventually offer other fields such as Natural Sciences, Economics, Law, and Civil Engineering.

== Politics ==
KNLP established a formal alliance with the Communist Party of Burma (CPB) in 1979 and adopted the Maoist "people's war" strategy upheld by the CPB. In 1983, under CPB's leadership, KNLP alongside Karenni National People's Liberation Front and Shan State National Liberation Organisation formed the central regional command which lasted until CPB was forced underground due to internal mutiny from its Wa and Kokang cadres.

On 11 August 1998, the KNLP issued a statement jointly with the Karenni National People's Liberation Front and the Shan State National Liberation Organisation supporting the National League for Democracy and calling for a National Assembly of elected representatives in the 1990 elections. The statement also called for tripartite talks between SLORC, NLD and EAOs.

In May 2004, a joint statement was issued with seven other EAOs at the National Convention to review the powers of the Tatmadaw in the new constitution and to respect the autonomy of ethnic minorities.

In June 2014, the KNLP supported the National League for Democracy's call for an amendment to Section 436 of the 2008 Constitution, which gives the Tatmadaw de facto veto power in constitutional reform. In December of the same year, it also stated that it would support any party other than the Union Solidarity and Development Party, a wing of the Tatmadaw, in the 2015 Myanmar general election.

There are connections between KNLP and NLD, as the daughter of KNLP Major Win Maw ran for Pyithu Hluttaw from NLD and won.

Ba Ham Htan, the son of KNLP's founder U Shwe Aye, was appointed the National Unity Government's Deputy Minister of the Ministry of Human Rights in May 2021, as a representative of KNLP in the shadow government formed by the elected lawmakers and ethnic minority leader in the aftermath of the military coup in February 2021.
