= Bawlakhe Township =

Bawlakhe Township ဘော်လခဲမြို့နယ်
- Township
- location in Bawlakhe district
- Coordinates: 19.1833°N 97.3500°E
- Country: Myanmar
- State: Kayah State
- District: Bawlakhe District
- Time zone: UTC+6:30 (MMT)

Bawlakhe Township (Burmese: ဘော်လခဲမြို့နယ်) is a township of Bawlakhe District in the southern part of Kayah State in Myanmar.

The district has become extensively deforested between 2010 and 2015.

The capital town is Bawlakhe.
