= Mese District =

Mese District မယ်စဲ့ ခရိုင်
- District
- location in Kayah State

- Location in Burma
- Coordinates: 18°40′0″N 97°40′0″E
- Country: Myanmar
- State: Kayah
- Time zone: UTC6:30 (MST)

Mese District (Burmese: မယ်စဲ့ ခရိုင်) is a district of Kayah State, Myanmar. Its principal town is Mese. This district borders Mae Hong Son Province of Thailand and has an open border trading station.

== Townships ==
Mese Township

The townships, cities, towns that are included in Mese District are as follows:

- Mese Township
  - Mese

== History ==
On April 30, 2022, new districts were expanded and organized. Mese Township from Bawlakhe District is promoted as a district.
