= Bawyan =

Village in Myanmar

Baw Yan ဘောရန်
- Village
- Interactive map of Baw Yan
- Coordinates: 19.8606°N 96.8309°E
- Country: Myanmar
- State: Shan State
- District: Kalaw District
- Township: Pekon Township
- Village Tract: Hkawng Ei
- Time zone: UTC+6:30 (MMT)

Bawyan is a village in the southern Shan State, Myanmar. It is located in rural Pekon Township near the border with Pinlaung Township. It is part of the Hkawng Ei village tract, which had a total population of 7302 people in 2023.

== History ==
During the current Myanmar civil war, the village became a major target during fighting along the Kayah-Shan border as part of a front between Pinlaung and Loikaw. In late September 2025, the Tatmadaw and militias aligned with the Pa-O National Organisation advanced their offensive into territory held by Karenni resistance forces. After brief clashes between the Junta & PNO milita and Karenni defenders in early October, the Junta and PNO militia entered and burnt down houses in Bawyan. In early November, Bawyan saw heavily fighting with artillery and drone strikes used in the battle over the village as the Tatmadaw and PNO attacked the town. Fighting continued through November, happening in bursts of three to four days causing evacuations, fires and casualties.
