= Hpasawng =

HpaSaung ဖားဆောင်းမြို့
- Location in Burma
- Coordinates: 18°50′N 97°16′E
- Country: Myanmar
- Division: Kayah State
- District: Bawlakhe District
- Township: Hpasawng Township
- Control: People's Defense Force

Population (2005)
  - Religions: Buddhism
- Time zone: UTC+6.30 (MST)

HpaSaung (Burmese: ဖားဆောင်းမြို့, MLCTS: hpaa.chaung.mrui) is a town in the Kayah State of eastern part of Burma. The town is currently in control of the People's Defence Force.

== Landmarks ==
- Hpasaung Hydropower Station
