= Steering Council for the Emergence of a Federal Democratic Union =

Military alliance in Myanmar

- ဖက်ဒရယ်ဒီမိုကရေစီပြည်ထောင်စုပေါ်ထွန်းရေး ဦးဆောင်ကောင်စီ
- Dates active: March 2026 – present
- Groups: National Unity Government; Sagaing Federal Unit; Magway Federal Unit; Mandalay Federal Unit; Committee Representing Pyidaungsu Hluttaw; Karen National Union; Chin National Front; Karenni State Interim Executive Council; Kachin Independence Organisation
- Active regions: Myanmar
- Ideology: Federal Democratic Union
- Wars: Myanmar conflict

The Steering Council for the Emergence of a Federal Democratic Union (Burmese: ဖက်ဒရယ်ဒီမိုကရေစီပြည်ထောင်စုပေါ်ထွန်းရေး ဦးဆောင်ကောင်စီ; abbreviated SCEF) is a political coalition of Myanmar rebel groups. It was formed after agreements from the Karen National Union, Chin National Front, the National Unity Government, the Kachin Independence Organisation, the Karenni State Interim Executive Council, and the Committee Representing Pyidaungsu Hluttaw on 30 March 2026.

== Objectives ==
According to the NUG, the SCEF was created to aid in the establishment of a post-coup transitional government that supports "States/Federal Units/EROs[,] the people[,] and women." Furthermore, the stated objectives of the SCEF includes: a government with an apolitical military force under civilian command, the abrogation of the 2008 Constitution of Myanmar, and the creation of a transitional justice system.

During a Kachin Martyrs' Day speech on 10 August 2026, KIO chairman, N'Ban La claimed that the SCEF works to close gaps between localized rebel forces and the NUG. Additionally, he spoke on how the SCEF is promoting more international diplomacy for the anti-coup cause.

== Actions ==
On 20 July 2026, the SCEF met with representatives of the Spring Revolution Alliance. Two days later, Mon groups (including the NMSP-AD) and the Pa-O National Liberation Organisation discussed Myanmar's political situation and roadmaps for a future federal government.

On 23 July, the United League of Arakan met with the SCEF for an hour to coordinate political processes and emergency flood relief.

On 8 September, the provisional governments of the Sagaing Federal Unit, the Magway Federal Unit, and the Mandalay Federal Unit were admitted into the SCEF.

== See also ==
- National Unity Consultative Council
