= Hpasawng Township =

Hpasawng Township ဖားဆောင်းမြို့နယ်
- Township
- Location in Bawlakhe district (in red)

- Location in Burma
- Coordinates: 18.8333°N 97.2667°E
- Country: Myanmar
- State: Kayah State
- District: Bawlakhe District

Population (2019)
  - Total: 23,000
- Time zone: UTC+6:30 (MMT)

Hpasaung Township (Burmese: ဖားဆောင်းမြို့နယ်; Pa'O: ဝေင်ꩻနယ်ႏဖားသောင်း, pronunciation: [weŋ˨ naːj˧ pʰa˥˦ˀ sɔːŋ˥˦ˀ]) is a township of Bawlakhe District in the Kayah State of Myanmar. The capital town is Hpasaung.
