= Bawlakhe District =

Bawlakhe District ဘော်လခဲခရိုင်
- District
- location in Kayah State

- Location within Myanmar
- Coordinates: 18°55′N 97°26′E
- Country: Myanmar
- State: Kayah State
- Seat: Bawlakhe
- Time zone: UTC6:30 (MMT)

Bawlakhe District (Burmese: ဘော်လခဲခရိုင်) is a district located near the Thanlwin River Basin, Kayah State, Myanmar.

map of Bawlakhe district

== Townships ==
The district contains the following townships:

- Bawlakhe Township
- Hpasaung Township

In April 2022, Mese Township was formed as Mese District.
