= Mese Township =

Mese Township မယ်စဲ့‌မြို့နယ်
- Township
- Mese Township (or) district in Kayah State

- Location in Burma
- Coordinates: 18.6333°N 97.6667°E
- Country: Burma
- State: Kayah State
- District: Mese District
- Time zone: UTC+6:30 (MST)

Mese Township (Burmese: မယ်စဲ့‌မြို့နယ်) is the only township of Mese District in the Kayah State, Myanmar. According to the Myanmar Department of Population, it had an estimated population of around 11,805 people in late 2024. The capital town is Mese.

The township was the site of the 2023 Battle of Mese.
