= Karenni State Interim Executive Council =

De facto autonomous government in Karenni State

Overview
- Established: 12 June 2023
- State: Karenni State
- Leader: Chair Khu Oo Reh
- Website: ieckarenni.org

Map of territory claimed by the Karenni IEC; Karenni State and Pekon Township

The Karenni State Interim Executive Council (Burmese: ကရင်နီပြည် ကြားကာလအုပ်ချုပ်ရေးကောင်စီ; Karenni IEC) is a provisional government established in Karenni State, Myanmar.

== History ==
The Karenni SIEC was established on 12 June 2023 by the Karenni State Consultative Council (KSCC) during the Myanmar civil war. It was created to unify the many Karenni resistance groups which control territory throughout Karenni State, bring stability to the region, and establish a unified governing body in resistance-held areas of Karenni State. The Karenni IEC is the first regional provisional government established during the Myanmar civil war, followed by several others, including the Chinland Council. It has implemented its own administrative delimitation in the territories under its control, demarcating 16 townships in place of the 7 townships recognized by the previous authorities. It also begun to set up its own justice system and to manage district and township courts. From the 15 February 2025 until July the Karenni SIEC controls estimated at 80% of the Historical Karenni State. Since July they now only control 70%.

On 30 March 2026, the IEC joined the newly-formed Steering Council for the Emergence of a Federal Democratic Union (SCEF) with the Kachin Independence Organisation, Chin National Front, Karen National Union, National Unity Government, and the Committee Representing Pyidaungsu Hluttaw.

== Leadership ==
- Chair: Khu Oo Reh
- Vice Chair: Khun Bedu
- Treasurer: Maw Poe Myar
- General Secretary: Khu Plu Reh
- 1st Secretary: Zu Padonmar
- 2nd Secretary: Banyar Khun Aung
