= Khun Bedu =

Burmese democracy activist

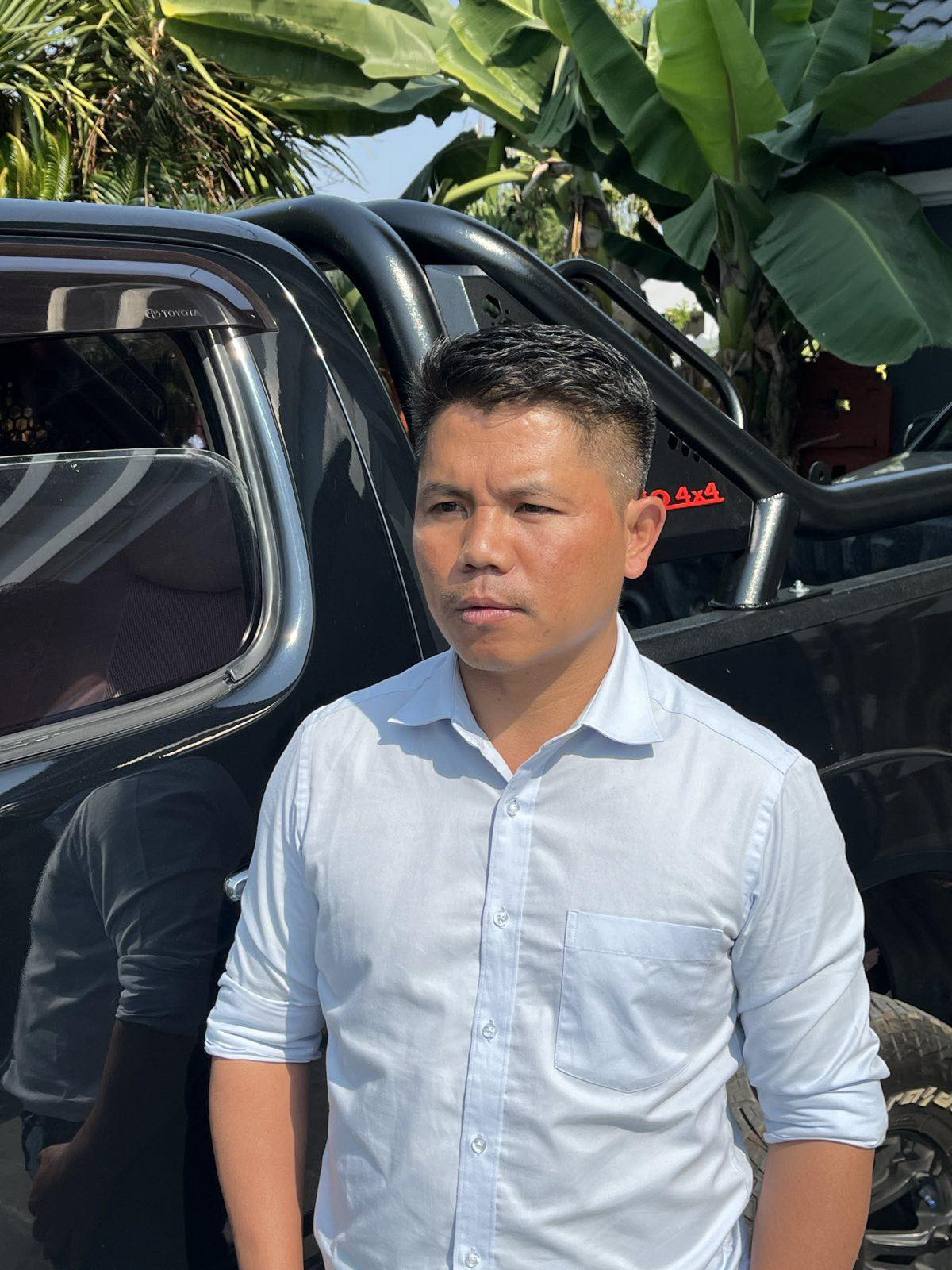
- Khun Bedu found in a liberated area (2024)

Vice President of Karenni State Interim Executive Council
- Incumbent
- Assumed office 12 June 2023

President of Karenni Nationalities Defence Force
- Incumbent
- Assumed office 31 May 2021

Spokesperson of Spring Revolution Alliance
- Incumbent
- Assumed office November 2025

Personal details
- Born: 12 June 1984 (age 42)
- Known for: anti-SPDC activism, 2008-2012 imprisonment

Khun Bedu (born 1984) is an ethnically Karenni Burmese political activist who was imprisoned from 2008 to 2012 for organizing protests against the 2008 Constitutional Referendum. He is the leader of the Karenni Nationalities Defence Force, an armed resistance/defence force and pro democracy group participating in the country's ongoing civil war. Khun Bedu is a devout Christian and believes in the fair treatment of enemies and encompasses his value system and beliefs to fight for freedom and justice for everyone regardless of ethnicity and faith. He was also democratically elected leader in the NUG. He draws inspiration from world leaders such as Winston Churchill, Abraham Lincoln, Golda Meir, John F. Kennedy, Martin Luther King Jr. and Lee Kuan Yew.

== Involvement in protests ==
In 2004, Khun Bedu joined the human rights group Kayan New Generation Youth (KNGY). He was appointed the group's joint secretary on 12 August 2007. In this role, he led trainings on human rights issues, community organizing, constitutional issues, and election systems.

In 2008, the State Peace and Development Council, Burma's military government, announced a referendum for a new constitution which guaranteed that one quarter of all parliamentary seats would be reserved for military officers, that the Ministry of Home Affairs would fall exclusively under military control, and that Burmese citizens married to foreigners would be ineligible for office, apparently disqualifying leading opposition figure and Nobel laureate Aung San Suu Kyi. Aung San Suu Kyi's party, the National League for Democracy, called on eligible citizens to vote "no" in the referendum, and claimed their campaign was violently suppressed by government officials as a result.

== Arrest and imprisonment ==
The KNGY human rights group also announced its opposition to the referendum. Khun Bedu, along with Khun Kawrio and Khun Dee De, reportedly organized members to protest the vote in Loikaw and Demo Soe, Kayah State. On 27 April, the words "no" and "vote no" began to appear on government signs, and on 30 April, group members sprayed a large "X" on a sign by the Loikaw city hall reading "To be a prosperous and developed nation, let’s support the referendum". The protesters also released balloons with attached signs reading "no", sent rafts from banana tree wood or bathing cups floating down the Beluchong River with small flags reading "vote no", and distributed copies of the video of the lavish wedding of Than Shwe's daughter.

On 10 May 2008, authorities arrested Khun Bedu, Khun Kawrio, and Khun Dee De and charged them with organizing the protests against the state. Amnesty International reported that the men were then tortured for fifteen days, with the techniques including beatings by guards, forced kneeling on stones, suffocation with plastic bags, waterboarding, and prolonged exposure to hostile weather. Khun Bedu and Khun Kawrio were sentenced to 37 years of imprisonment apiece, and Khun Dee De to 35 years.

== Myanmar civil war ==
Khun Bedu is the chairman of the Karenni Nationalities Defence Force, a resistance group opposed to the country's military dictatorship in the ongoing civil war.

Khun Bedu thought the ceasefire of Operation 1027 allowed the military to "consolidate their power and continue to maintain the central area". He cited possibly China or Iran for supporting the military in equipment, he stated that the junta is more frequently using drones rigged with explosives in kamikaze-style attacks or to drop bombs on resistance positions.

== International attention ==
Khun Bedu served his sentence in Taungoo prison of Bago Division. Amnesty International considered him a prisoner of conscience and called for his immediate release. The British ambassador to Burma reportedly also pressed the government to release Khun Bedu.

In 2010, British Shadow Treasury Minister David Hanson spoke out on behalf of Khun Bedu and other Burmese political prisoners, stating that "Just days before the Burmese elections I want to show my support for those political prisoners who are unfairly imprisoned purely for speaking out against an unjust regime ... We must not forget them and must each do our bit to remind the world of their plight."

== Release ==
According to the Assistance Association for Political Prisoners, Khun Bedu was pardoned on 13 January 2012, as part of a series of amnesties for political prisoners.
