= Karenni National People's Liberation Front =

Insurgent group in Myanmar

- ကရင်နီပြည်လူမျိုးပေါင်းစုံပြည်သူ့လွတ်မြောက်ရေးတပ်ဦး
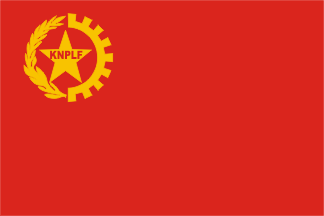
- Flag of the Karenni National People's Liberation Front
- Leader: U Tun Kyaw
- Founded: June 26, 1978; 48 years ago
- Dates active: 1978–2009, 2023–present (As KNPLF); 2009–2023 (As BGF)
- Split from: Karenni Army
- Headquarters: Pankan village, Loikaw Township
- Active regions: Kayah State; Myanmar-Thailand border
- Ideology: Marxism-Leninism; Revolutionary socialism Karenni nationalism Federalism
- Size: 2,000 (2021)

The Karenni National People's Liberation Front (KNPLF) is a Marxist-Leninist and Karenni nationalist insurgent group active in Kayah State, Myanmar (Burma). It agreed to become a government-sponsored border guard force on 8 November 2009 although it remains active under the name of KNPLF. Starting from 13 June 2023, it has decided to change sides to the Karen National Liberation Army (KNLA), Karenni Army (KA), Karenni Nationalities Defense Force (KNDF), and People's Defense Force (PDF) and fight the military regime.

== History ==
The KNPLF was formed in 1978, when a group of left-wing fighters split from the Karenni Army due to ideological differences. In 1983, under CPB's leadership, KNPLF alongside Kayan New Land Party and Shan State National Liberation Organisation formed the central regional command. The group maintained close ties with the Communist Party of Burma (CPB), receiving training, supplies, and armed support from the group until the latter's disarmament in 1989.

In 1989, a ceasefire deal was negotiated between the State Law and Order Restoration Council (SLORC) and the KNPLF, which was finalised in 1994. The group had since helped government soldiers combat other armed insurgent groups, most notably the Karenni Army, and on 8 November 2009, the group agreed to transform into a "border guard force".

The KNPLF has been accused of using child soldiers and landmines in the past, with one child soldier named Koo Reh at age 13 saying:

"I was watching the film [in the cinema], and he [the recruiter] sat and talked to me. He said if I joined I would be happy and receive a salary and uniform. I do not remember his name but he was from KNPLF. I agreed to join. He spoke to many people in the cinema, one by one, 20 or 25 people, adults, women, boys. About six people went with him. The older ones were 16 or 17, the younger ones 11, 12 or 13. I went home but didn't tell my mother, then I went with him."

== Recent events ==
Four KNPLF / BGF soldiers were murdered alongside at least 45 civilians during the Mo So massacre committed by the Burmese military on the Christmas Eve of 2021. KNPLF / BGF personnel tried to negotiate with soldiers from the Burmese army to stop them from burning civilians alive but were instead murdered by being shot in their heads.

KNPLF has also received weapons from the powerful United Wa State Army (UWSA) post-military coup and allegedly been involved in resistance efforts against the Burmese military despite being reformed as a Border Guard Force. Chit Tun, a high ranking member of KNPLF was appointed as one of the two Deputy Ministers of Federal Union Affairs in the National Unity Government (NUG), a parallel government formed by elected lawmakers and members of parliament ousted in the coup d'état. KNPLF announced its support for NUG and some low ranking KNPLF members fought alongside Karenni Nationalities Defence Force against the Burmese military.

In June 2023, KNPLF openly defected to anti-junta forces and joined forces with Karenni Army, Karenni Nationalities Defence Force, Karen National Liberation Army, and People's Defence Force and began attacking Burmese military positions. The combined resistance forces seized junta outposts and took over Maese township in Eastern Kayah State.
