= Karenni Nationalities Defence Force =

Armed resistance group in Myanmar

Karenni Nationalities Defense Force
- ကရင်နီအမျိုးသားများကာကွယ်ရေးတပ်ဖွဲ့
- Flag of the Karenni Nationalities Defense Force
- Founding leader: Khun Bedu
- Founded: 31 May 2021
- Dates active: 31 May 2021 – present
- Country: Myanmar
- Active regions: Kayah State; Shan State; Kayin State; Myanmar-Thailand border
- Ideology: Secularism; Federalism; Democracy; Minority rights
- Size: 7000+

The Karenni Nationalities Defence Force (KNDF; Burmese: ကရင်နီအမျိုးသားများကာကွယ်ရေးတပ်ဖွဲ့,) is a pro-democracy armed organization currently fighting in the Myanmar civil war. It is a defence force for the local Karenni federal state formed in response to the 2021 Myanmar coup d'état. The KNDF also includes other organizations and Operate under the commander-in-chief of Karenni Army (KA) armed wing of KNPP, which an official regard as "good relations between the EAOs and the public". The KNDF has engaged in fighting with the junta, mainly with the 66th Light Infantry Division.

On 6 June 2023, the KNDF issued a report on the second anniversary of its founding. They stated that they have established 22 battalions and six brigades. They also claimed that the junta now has control over Loikaw and other urban wards only, and most areas in the state are under the control of the resistance groups. As of January 2025, the KNDF sees itself as a defence force aiding the Pro Democracy movement and not a traditional Ethnic Armed Organization. The KNDF, as of 2025, includes many ethnicities and cultural backgrounds.

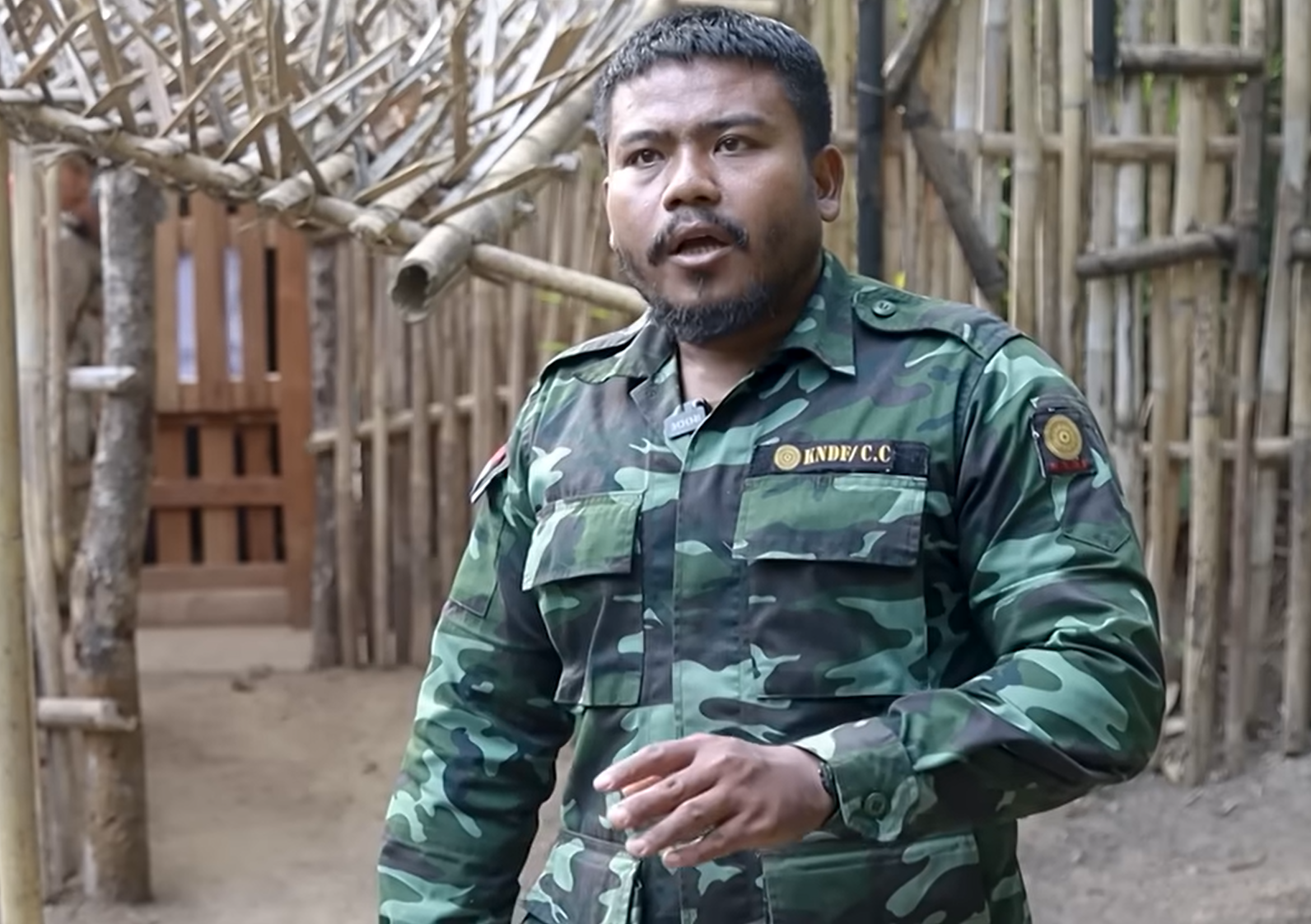
KNDF deputy commander-in-chief, Mawi, during a January 2024 interview with Myanmar Pressphoto Agency

== Objective ==
In an interview, the spokesperson of the KNDF told media groups that the KNDF is a fusion of all Karenni State's dispersed youth forces of all ethnicities and backgrounds. Uniting them to more effectively fight the junta. The KNDF primarily focuses on a united Pro Democracy front and envisions itself as an example of unity regardless of ethnicity. It was also stated that they have a shortage of weapons and ammunition. Regardless of their shortage of defence equipment, the KNDF views federal rule with a professional defence force as its top priority. The leadership of KNDF envisions a unified Myanmar(Burma) with no divisions on Race/Culture and ethnicity. The KNDF objective is also aligned with the NUG in optimism that Myanmar(Burma) will one day be a culturally diverse and independent nation from military rule and dictatorship.

The objective is the same as that of other resistance groups in Myanmar: to overthrow the military junta. It is also to ensure the unity of the people in Karenni State, encourage collaboration and pay special attention to the Karenni National Progressive Party's position. The KNDF also works closely with the Karenni state police to ensure no atrocities are committed in retaliation and follows the code and ethics of warfare according to the Geneva Convention. They are a progressive fighting force motivated by the mission of a unified non-ethnicity bias defence force. Its primary goal is for the defence of the people of Karenni state first and foremost from indiscriminate attacks by the Junta.

== Defence policy ==
The KNDF, which was founded alongside the regional PDFs and other militias, follows the NUG and CRPH's defence policy, according to the KNDF's spokesperson.

The NUG's Ministry of Defence published a seven-point defense policy with the goal of ensuring that the defense industry is democratically controlled and operates according to a federal system.

The policy encompasses leadership, defence policy formulation and execution, legislative and judicial checks and balances on the military sector, defence administration, the enforcement of internationally recognized laws and ethics, title and duty designation, financial management, and resource sharing. They also look into the international community and draw inspiration from countries with a mixed ethnicity defence force and emulate nation states which have survived years of potential threats. Countries such as Finland, Israel, Singapore, South Korea, Sweden and South Sudan have been an inspiration to their motivation that an effective defence force is crucial when potential threats are at the doorstep. The KNDF also has a very disciplined selection process for its officers and the recruitment of its personnel. Their leadership is also made up of multi ethnic leaders who can put aside cultural differences to work for the greater good of the people.

According to the KNDF's spokesman, the KNDF, which was founded in accordance with the NUG's defence plans, has three Karenni State-based PDFs, two Shan State-based PDFs, and several EAOs. The KNDF accepts recruits from all different ethnic backgrounds and religious groups, in stark contrast to the Myanmar military and other EOAs. Their leadership is made up of Christians and Buddhists working together to defend the Karenni state from the military regime.

== Defence doctrine/structure ==
The KNDF has developed their military doctrine/structure from lessons learnt from other nations. They have a structured Basic Military Training School, from which commanders are selected based on meritocracy and leadership skills, emulating various defence doctrines of other nations. The defence doctrine also focuses on military tactics and education including military history. The personnel in KNDF are said to be proficient in education and are also considered progressive and open minded. They have their own organized central command structures which also emulate certain nations ranging from: Manpower/Logistics/Intelligence/Operations/Planning/Signals/Training.

This progressive doctrine allows them to have good combat and control coordination against their adversaries.

The KNDF also works closely with civilian aid groups and NGOs to ensure the evacuation and protection of civilian lives.

== Conflict history ==
The KNDF has been involved in the Myanmar civil war since May 2021. In 2022 alone, they engaged in 341 clashes with the regime, killing 797 junta troops and suffering 65 losses. The KNDF, together with its allies, is also reportedly one of the few pro-democracy groups that have successfully shot down a Myanmar Airforce jet as it was bombing civilians on 20 June 2023. The aircraft was shot down using tactics employed similar to NATO air defense strategies by creating an envelope of fire with light munitions.

In July 2025, the KNDF claimed responsibility for shooting down a Myanmar military FTC-2000G fighter jet, an export variant of the Chinese-made Guizhou JL-9, during its offensive in Hpasawng town, Karenni (Kayah) State. According to the junta sources, the jet went missing two days prior to the report while conducting airstrikes in support of junta forces, and wreckage was later discovered near a village close to the Bago Region border.

== Internal incidents ==
The KNDF also has a structured system in their military doctrine. In 2024, a military investigation was carried out by the KNDF central military court sentenced three people found responsible for the tragic incident involving 18 pro democracy medic trainees who were swept away during a river crossing exercise. They were sentenced under the KNDF military penal code of conduct.

== Justice system and POW treatment ==
The KNDF is known for its treatment of all prisoners of war according to the Geneva Convention. It has been well documented that the KNDF believes in re-education and reconciliation through rehabilitation. The KNDF houses all prisoners in various locations and the prisoners are taken care of under the civil penal code under the jurisdiction of the local Karenni police force. This is seen as a progressive approach to the mission that a united Myanmar, through understanding, is also a key factor to ending the junta's reign. The KNDF also punishes fighters who commit war crimes, as 2 fighters were sentenced to 20 years in prison for killing a Free Burma Rangers member.

== See also ==
- Myanmar civil war (2021–present)
- People's Defence Force (Myanmar)
- Karenni National Progressive Party
