= Hopong Koyinlay =

Burmese Buddhist monk (1974 – 2021)

Ashin Porisa (Burmese: အရှင်ပေါရိသ), also known as Hopong Koyinlay (Burmese: ဟိုပုံးကိုရင်လေး; 1974 — 1 September 2021), was an influential Pa'O monk from Hopong in southern Shan State.

He was known for his religious works on Pa'O Self-Administered Zone and led the Htam Sam Cave. Koyinlay and his monastery area were guarded by Pa-O National Army.

He became a samanera at the age of six. He cut his pinkie for his deep religious donation. He found a cave as suggestion of his dream. Koyinlay said he subsequently returned to the caves, exploring the deeper caverns while fighting off the ghosts and evil spirits that were roaming in the darkness, disturbing his meditation sequences. He built many Buddhist images and pagodas in the cave. The cave was named Htam Sam Cave and became a popular pilgrimage destination.

He has not yet obtained the title of 'sayadaw' even at age 40. He is referred to as "Koyinlay" (meaning 'young novice'), probably in reference to his young age when he had the visions.

Koyinlay had been highly influenced on Pa-O people and Pa-O National Army. He led the local people in teaching military skills. In 2015, he ordered the construction of a smaller replica of Shwedagon Pagoda in Hopong. Koyinlay's Myitta Kham Tan gang, which has over 5,000 members, has teamed up with the Myanmar military in Hopong Township, Shan State.

Koyinlay died on 1 September 2021, at the age of 47, as a result of coronavirus disease (COVID-19).
