= Pinlaung massacre =

2023 mass killing in Shan State, Myanmar

Coordinates: 19°54′02.1″N 96°50′09.0″E

- Part of the 2021 Myanmar coup d'état and the Myanmar civil war (2021–present)
- Site of massacre (Myanmar)
- Location: Namneng, Shan State
- Date: 11 March 2023
- Deaths: 30+
- Perpetrators: (Myanmar) State Administration Council; Myanmar Army
- Charges: None

The Pinlaung massacre was a mass killing of civilians by Burmese military forces on 11 March 2023, in the village of Namneng, Shan State. During the massacre, Myanmar Army troops killed at least 30 civilians, including 3 Buddhist monks. The massacre occurred 9 days after the Tar Taing massacre in Sagaing.

== Background ==
On 1 February 2021, the Myanmar Armed Forces staged a coup d'état and deposed the democratically elected government led by the National League for Democracy. Shortly thereafter, the military established a junta, the State Administration Council (SAC), and declared a national state of emergency. In response, civilians throughout the country staged large-scale protests to resist the military takeover.

By May 2021, the civilian-led resistance had escalated into a civil war against the SAC, which was unwilling to compromise. Namneng (Shan: ၼမ်ႉၼဵင်ႈ; Burmese: နန်းနိမ့်, variously spelt Namneint, Nanneint, Nam Neng, Nam Hnain, Nan Neint, Nan Nein, etc.) is situated in a contested area of Shan State. The village, whose villagers are predominantly Pa'O, is part of Pinlaung Township (also spelt Panglong) in Shan State's Pa'O Self-Administered Zone, which is controlled by the Pa-O National Organisation (PNO), an ally of the military junta. The zone acts as a strategic buffer between more restive parts of Shan, Kayin and Kayah States and the national capital of Naypyidaw.

In the wake of the civil war, Pa'O youths, like many throughout the country, formed and joined resistance forces like the Pa-O National Defence Force, in opposition to military rule. By September 2021, the PNO's armed wing, the Pa-O National Army (PNA), began partnering with Myanmar army troops in military operations to capture resistance bases. In July 2022, the PNO began an effort to forcibly conscript villagers into a new local militia. The PNA also expanded recruitment efforts as fighting intensified in the region.

== Incident ==
The Burmese army has employed a 'four cuts' strategy, to cut off resistance groups from access to food, financing, intelligence, and recruits, by denying humanitarian access, razing entire villages, and using indiscriminate airstrikes and artillery shelling.

In January 2023, Burmese military forces began indiscriminate military airstrikes and shelling in Pinlaung Township, including the nearby villages of Nampan and Leinlin. On 24 February, ground fighting began in Pinlaung Township, forcing more than 5,000 villagers to flee, including most villagers from Namneng. However, 33 villagers, including the abbot of the local Buddhist monastery in Namneng, two disciple monks and 30 lay followers, remained in the village, which was otherwise deserted.

On 11 March, around 5 am, Burmese army troops began raiding Namneng, while a unit situated on a nearby hill shelled the village with artillery. In response, a clash broke out between resistance fighters from the People's Defence Force and Karenni Nationalities Defence Force, which attacked army troops that were torching houses in the village. The Burmese army and resistance forces both sustained losses during the conflict.

That evening, resistance forces retreated after military aircraft attacked the village. Military forces torched approximately 50 homes in the village, and a total of at least 200 houses in the area were burned down. Army troops proceeded to occupy the local monastery. The following morning, resistance forces that returned to the village uncovered the bodies of 28 civilians, including 3 Buddhist monks at that local monastery. The victims, most of whom displayed cranial gunshot wounds, had been executed by army troops. The monastery's walls were also pocked with bullet holes.

== Perpetrators ==
The attack was carried out by Myanmar Army troops which ultimately reports to Min Aung Hlaing, who also heads the military junta, the State Administration Council. Bullets and weaponry used by the Burmese military, including 5.51 mm (0.217 in) and 5.56 mm (0.219 in) bullets, M79 bullets, and heavy weapon shrapnel, and empty bullet boxes, were later found at the massacre site.

== Victims ==
As of 13 March, the bodies of 28 villagers, including 3 monks, had been retrieved, while five remained missing. Most of the victims were associated with the local Buddhist monastery in Namneng. Victims were found with multiple gunshot wounds, knife wounds, and signs of torture, including broken legs, bruises, and burns. Many victims had been shot at "very, very close range" and repeatedly slashed with knives to ensure they were dead. The monks, identified as Paṇḍi (aged 45), Sobhāka (aged 66), and Kovida (aged 66), were cremated on 14 March. The missing villagers are believed to have been kidnapped by the military, to be used for propaganda purposes to exonerate the army from its role in the massacre.

== Reactions ==
=== Domestic ===
On 13 March, Zaw Min Tun, the military junta's spokesman, claimed on Myawaddy TV that resistance forces including the KNDF had instigated the skirmish, by ambushing military troops and allied Pa-O National Army fighters entering the village. He refuted allegations that the military had killed villagers in the skirmish, calling it "misinformation." The following day, the PNO, which is an ally of the military, blamed the KNDF for the massacre.

The KNDF has posited that the military is actively trying to incite ethnoreligious conflict by killing Buddhist monks and civilians inside a monastic compound. The KNDF includes ethnic Karennis who are predominantly Christian, while the Pa'O are predominantly Buddhist. On 16 March, the opposition National Unity Government (NUG) echoed the KNDF's sentiments, accusing the military of sowing religious conflict, when it released details of the massacre. Aung Myo Min from the NUG called the massacre a "terror campaign" and called for a global arms embargo and other decisive actions against the Burmese military. He noted that this massacre fit the military's pattern of routinely attacking civilians, and the escalation of violence against civilians in recent months. The Pa-O National Federal Council (PNFC), a political leadership body composed of Pa-O armed resistance forces, members of the Civil Disobedience Movement (CDM) and Pa-O civil society organisations, issued a statement highlighting the junta's intention to sow mistrust between the Pa-O and Karenni communities.

=== International ===
In response to the massacre, Phil Robertson, the deputy head of Human Rights Watch called on the international community to impose sanctions on the Myanmar armed forces to end these massacres, and noted that the increase in 'brutal massacres' indicated that "the junta commanders have given the green light to their troops to indiscriminately attack civilian targets without hesitation."

A week before the massacre, the Office of the United Nations High Commissioner for Human Rights had separately condemned the Burmese military's scorched earth strategy, which has killed thousands of civilians and destroyed 39,000 houses throughout the country since February 2022.

== See also ==
- 2021 Myanmar coup d'état
- Myanmar civil war (2021–present)
- List of massacres in Myanmar
