= Khun Tan (mystic) =

Burmese mystic

Personal life
- Born: Khun Aung; 1992 (age 33–34) Kone Tha village, Hopong, Shan State
- Spouse: 6 wives (officially married)
- Occupation: former novice monk, layman

Religious life
- Religion: Buddhism
- Temple: Alantaya religious area
- School: Theravada

Khun Tan (Burmese: ခွန်တန်; born Khun Aung (Burmese: ခွန်အောင်), 1992), also known as Zat Lite (Burmese: ဇာတ်လိုက်), is a Pa'O religious figure, mystic, and sex predator who is believed to be the reincarnation of influential Pa'O Buddhist monk Alantaya Sayadaw by people from the Alantaya religious area and postured as the next Buddha in order to seduce young girls.

Khun Tan's sexual abuse of young girls is referred to as the modern "Panoo hlut" (ပန်းဦးလွှတ်, lit. offering of first virginity), an ancient tradition of Ari Buddhism during the early Pagan dynasty.

== Life ==
Khun Tan was born in 1992 in Kone Tha village, Hopong, Shan State. At the age of nine, Khun Tan moved to Thaton's Alantaya, the area surrounding the monastery of Alantaya Sayadaw Ashin Sakka. He became a samanera (novice monk) and sought to gain the belief of the Pao'O people by claiming to be the next Buddha and the reincarnation of Alantaya Sayadaw. According to local people, when he arrived in the area, he had memories of the deceased Alantaya Sayadaw and was said to be able to identify the Sayadaw's personal belongings. Ashin Arira Wuntha, the son and successor of the Alantaya Sayadaw, recognized Khun Tan as his father and instructed the local people to worship Khun Tan before his passing. This led locals to believe that he might be an incarnation of the Sayadaw. By 2013, he had gained significant influence in the area, and the local people began to revere him as a bodhisattva.

Some in Alantaya believe that women born under ill-fated circumstances can restore balance by marrying Khun Tan. He seduced hundreds of young girls, mostly aged around 15 to 18, under the guise of religious devotion. Khun Tan reportedly claimed to have officially married six Pa'O girls in a formal wedding ceremony within the Alantaya. According to reports, some parents feel regret if Khun Tan does not choose their daughter because they think that her marriage to him would be a blessing. Worship of Khun Tan is deeply ingrained in the area; his followers have claimed that they would be willing to die for him. Every household shrine in the Alantaya area features offerings of flowers and oil lamps to an image of Khun Tan, placed next to the revered figures of the Alantaya Sayadaw and his successor, Ashin Arira Wuntha.

After leaving the monkhood at the age of 20, he formed an armed gang named Dragon Battalion and instructed his followers to set fire to the cars and motorcycles of locals who did not accept him as the next Buddha. Khun Tan often committed unacceptable and cruel acts, such as stepping on monks' heads with his feet and striking children with motorcycles from behind. He compensated the victims for the injuries caused by these assaults. He is also linked to drug trafficking.

Khun Tan's crimes were not widely known until the case was revealed on October 17, 2017, by MP Khine Khine Lei from the Mon State Hluttaw, which brought significant public attention to the issue.

=== Lawsuit ===
On October 24, 2017, Win Nyunt, the father of one of the girls, filed a case accusing Khun Tan of exploiting the girls. Khun Tan was charged under Penal Code sections 366 for abduction with intent to forcefully engage, 363 for kidnapping, and 114 for abetment. Win Nyunt has received death threats for filing the case. The Religious Affairs Ministry also sued Khun Tan and his five followers under Article 295(A) of the Penal Code for undermining Buddhism after renovating the Alantaya Pagoda without obtaining the necessary permissions from the government. Khun Tan's case was heard at the Mon State Hluttaw in Mawlamyine.

To facilitate Khun Tan's arrest, the Mon State Government established an investigative commission involving monks. After conducting preliminary investigations, the commission issued an arrest warrant. However, Khun Tan has fled to Shan State. The Mon State Government negotiated with the Shan State Government to capture Khun Tan. The Myanmar National Women's Empowerment Leadership Group announced that they will file initial defamation charges against Khun Tan if he is arrested.

In January 2018, the Mon State Religious Affairs Department filed a complaint at the Thaton Township Court, requesting action against Khun Tan and his group for their involvement in religious malpractices. On May 13, 2018, a Pa'O ethnic group held a press conference in Bago, urging the withdrawal of charges against Khun Tan and his followers. Even though Khun Tan fled and became notorious after his news was made public, people in that area still worship him.

== See also ==
- Phoe Ta Khit
- Hopong Koyinlay
