= Alantaya Pagoda =

Buddhist stupa in Mon State, Myanmar

- အလံတရာဘုရား
- Location within Myanmar

Religion
- Affiliation: Theravada Buddhism

Location
- Location: Thaton, Mon State
- Country: Myanmar
- Coordinates: 17.0064°N 97.3494°E

Architecture
- Founder: Alantaya Sayadaw
- Groundbreaking: 1952
- Completed: 1977
- Height (max): 375 ft

Alantaya Pagoda (Burmese: အလံတရာဘုရား) is a Buddhist temple situated in Thaton, Myanmar, constructed by the Alantaya Sayadaw in 1952. The stupa stands on a 114-meter (375 ft) high foundation and enshrines a replica of the Buddha's hair.

== History ==
According to the pagoda's historical inscription written in both Burmese and Pa'O languages, the Alantaya Sayadaw led the formation of the Ten Paramis group, which successively constructed a golden stupa in 1952, followed by a renovation to a stupa measuring 100 inches in 1954, a stupa of 100 feet in 1957, a stupa of 100 cubits in 1958, and a stupa of 180 cubits in 1959. Later, in 1973, a stupa measuring 100 alan (a Burmese unit of measurement where one alan equals four cubits) based on the hand measurement of a ten-year-old hermit was erected. The sacred diamond pinnacle was then placed during a ceremony in 1977.

The Alantaya Buddhist Area was established by the Alantaya Sayadaw to care for the pagoda and perform both major and minor religious duties. It has been divided into 12 inner and outer wards, with residents categorized into two groups: one for vegetarians and the other for non-vegetarians. The Alantaya Sayadaw has set strict rules for monks, nuns, and laypeople who wish to live in the six inner wards of the vegetarian zone. They are required to refrain from riding bicycles, wearing watches, listening to the radio, and engaging in any form of commerce.

In the Alantaya area, there are approximately 680 households, with a population exceeding 1,700. The majority of the residents, about 85%, are Pa'O people, along with smaller communities of Karen, Burmese, and Mon.

The Alantaya Sayadaw died in 1994, after which his son and successor, Ashin Arira Wuntha, assumed responsibility for the pagoda. In 2003, Khun Tan, a young novice monk from Hopong, arrived in the Alantaya area at the age of nine. Claiming to be the reincarnation of the Alantaya Sayadaw, Khun Tan gained notoriety for seducing hundreds of young girls by portraying himself as the next Buddha. In October 2017, Khun Tan and five of his followers faced a lawsuit filed by the Religious Affairs Ministry under Article 295(A) of the Penal Code for undermining Buddhism. This action came after they renovated the Alantaya Pagoda without the required government approvals.
