= Pa-O National Army =

Ethnic army in Myanmar

- ပအိုဝ်ႏစွိုးခွိုꩻတပ်မတောႏ
- Flag of the Pa-O people, used by the PNA
- Leader: U Aung Kham Hti
- Military leader: Khun Myint Aung
- Dates active: 1949 – 9 December 2009; 2021–present
- Headquarters: Taunggyi, Shan State, Myanmar
- Active regions: Pa-O Self-Administered Zone (controlled territory)
- Ideology: Pa-O nationalism Buddhist nationalism Ultranationalism
- Size: 4,000 (2023) 41,000 (2024)
- Wars: the Internal conflict in Myanmar
- Website: https://paonational.army/

The Pa-O National Army (Pa'o Karen: ပအိုဝ်ႏစွိုးခွိုꩻတပ်မတောႏ, Burmese: ပအိုဝ်းအမျိုးသားတပ်မတော်; abbreviated PNA) is a Pa-O state sponsored militia in Myanmar (Burma). It was established in 1949 and is the armed wing of the Pa-O National Organisation.

The PNA protects the PNO-governed Pa-O Self-Administered Zone, which consists of three townships in southern Shan State: Hopong, Hsi Hseng, and Pinlaung townships.

The PNA signed a ceasefire agreement with the then ruling State Peace and Development Council on 11 April 1991 and reformed itself as a people's militia force. It merged with other Pa-O paramilitary groups on 9 December 2009. Following the military coup d'état on 1 February 2021, there have been reports of PNA forcibly recruiting locals, extorting money and conducting joint operations with the Burmese military against resistance groups. An outpost occupied by allied forces of the Burmese military and PNA in Nyaung Shwe Township, southern Shan State was seized by a joint force of Pekon People's Defence Force and Karenni Nationalities Defence Force in May 2022.

On 9 January 2025, the Karenni Nationalities Defense Force captured an alleged 15 year-old child soldier in the PNA.
