= Khun San Lwin =

Burmese politician

Khun San Lwin (Burmese: ခွန်စံလွင်) is a Pa'O politician of Burma. He is a former member of the Pa-O National Organization and currently Chairman of the Pa'O Self-Administered Zone. He was appointed to the State Administration Council in 2023.
