= Pinlaung =

Pang Laung ပင်လောင်ꩻ
- Town
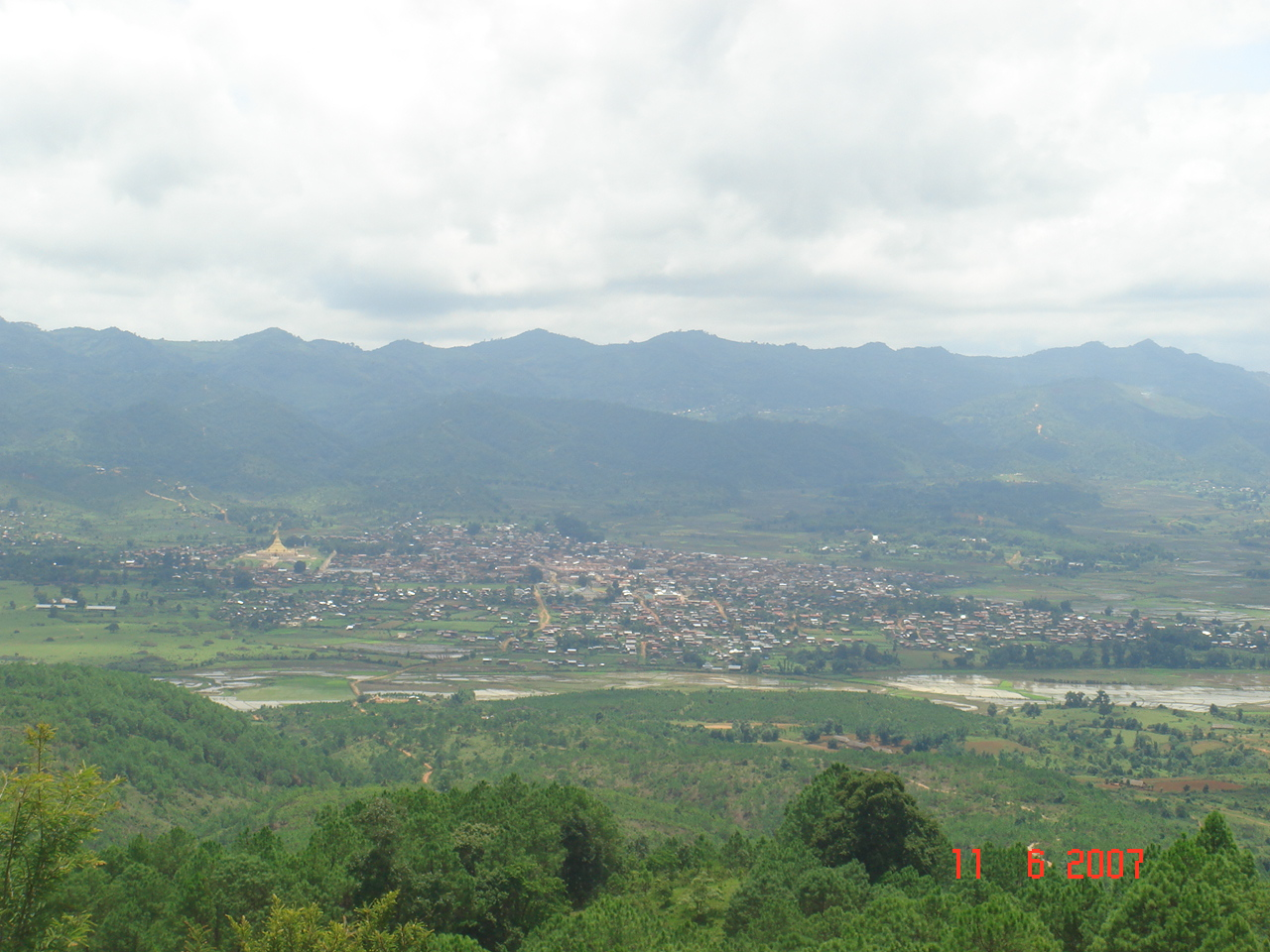
- Aerial View of Pinlaung

- Location in Burma
- Coordinates: 20°5′42″N 96°47′23″E
- Country: Myanmar
- State: Shan State
- District: Pa'O Self-Administered Zone
- Township: Pinlaung Township
- Elevation: 1,510 m (4,950 ft)
- Time zone: UTC+6.30 (MST)

Pinlaung is a town 1,510 metres (4,950 ft) above sea level and seat of Pinlaung Township, in the Pa-O Self-Administered Zone of Shan State of eastern-central Burma. It lies along National Road 54, north-west by road from Loikaw. Running through the city center is a rail line connecting Loikaw to Kalaw, two major tourist towns in the area.

== Demographics ==
Pinlaung is primarily home to Pa'O and Shan ethnic groups.

== Tourism ==
Tourists who visit the town of Pinlaung may visit Mway Daw Pagoda, the Nam Hoo Kyaung Tike Temple, and an authentic traditional craft market. Twenty minutes from the city center is another popular destination with tourists, Loi Maung Taung Pagoda. This stupa sits at the highest peak in the region, Loi Maung Taung. Another, lesser-known, mountain outside of the city center is Wingabar Mountain. This historic mountain is located 3.5 miles (5.6 km) from Pinlaung in the village of Taung Hti Bwar and features a full-length cave, called Yar Za Cave or Hti Bwar Cave.

== Economics ==
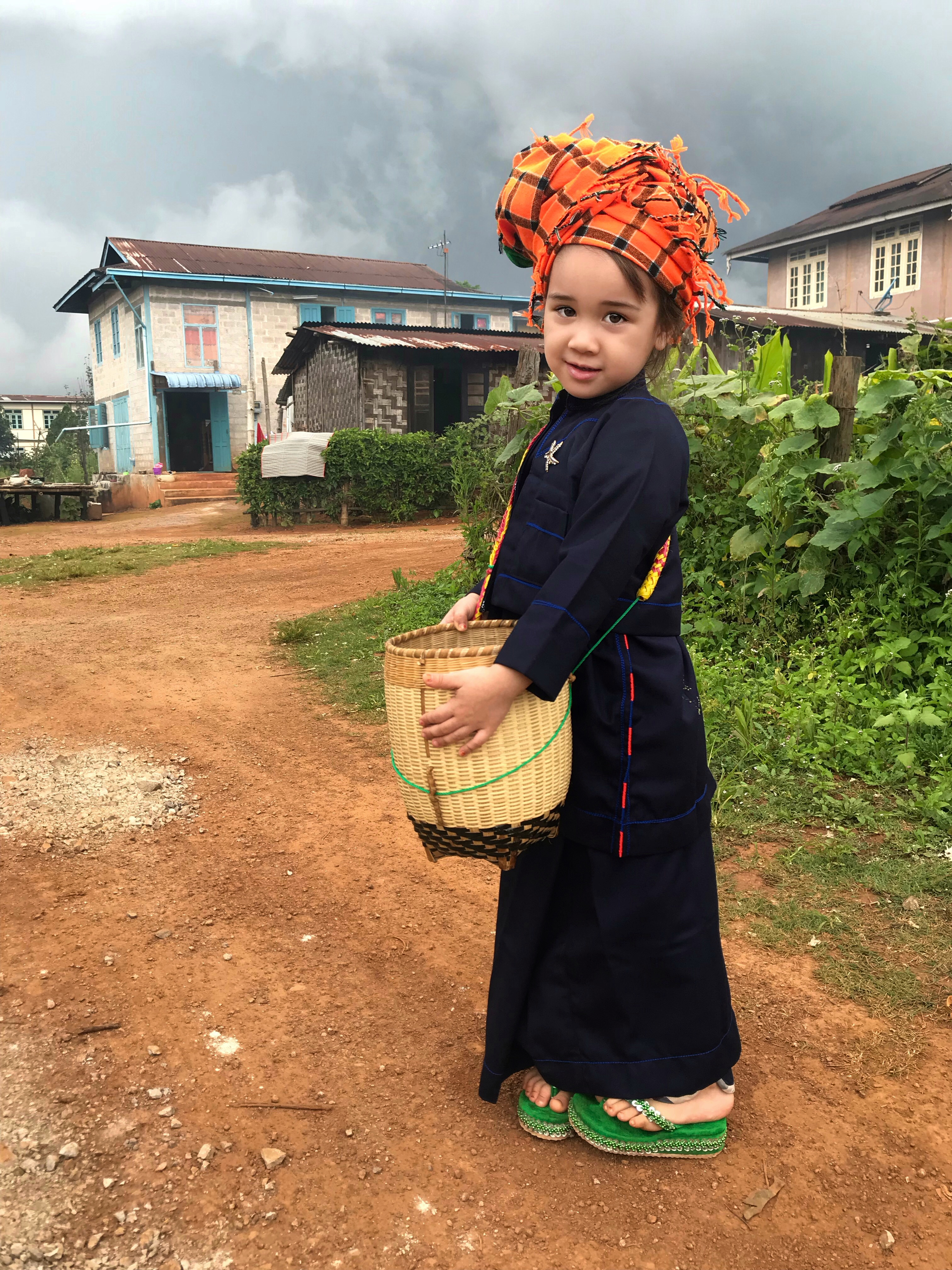
Girl in Pa'O traditional dress on a potato farm in Pinlaung, Pinlaung Township, Shan State, Myanmar (Pa'O Self-Administered Zone)

Traditionally, farmers from the Pinlaung area grew subsistence crops such as cheroot leaves, maize and beans. When the opium trade took off in the 1900s, poppy became a major cash crop in the area. However, in recent years, there have been efforts to focus on other saleable crops such as coffee and tea. Now, Pinlaung is the premier tea-growing town in Myanmar, with the Assam tea being the most predominant cultivar grown. Furthermore, cabbage, cauliflower, potato, corn and sesame grow in abundance due to the favourable climate conditions.

Before 2010, accessing Pinlaung was a difficult task. Merchants from Naypyidaw, southern, and western Myanmar who wanted trade with the highland farmers and ethnic tribes in Pinlaung were required to traverse the dangerous winding roads of Elephant Mountain (Sin Taung) and cross the Paung Laung River by boat. Then, Myanmar's former government contracted P.T.Waagner-Biro Indonesia together with Supreme Group of Companies to construct an expansive steel truss suspension bridge to span the river. The bridge, known as the Leinli Bridge, would become the highest of its kind in Myanmar. The bridge was opened on 5 November 2010, at a cost of 3.476 million in foreign currency and an additional 14,500 million kyats.

== Climate ==
Pinlaung has a subtropical highland climate (Cwb).

Climate data for Pinlaung, elevation 1,463 m (4,800 ft), (1981–2010, extremes 2001–2010)
Month	Jan	Feb	Mar	Apr	May	Jun	Jul	Aug	Sep	Oct	Nov	Dec	Year
Record high °C (°F)	28.3 (82.9)	28.2 (82.8)	31.4 (88.5)	33.0 (91.4)	33.4 (92.1)	29.6 (85.3)	28.4 (83.1)	29.4 (84.9)	28.6 (83.5)	29.4 (84.9)	28.6 (83.5)	26.8 (80.2)	33.4 (92.1)
Mean daily maximum °C (°F)	22.7 (72.9)	24.1 (75.4)	26.5 (79.7)	28.2 (82.8)	25.9 (78.6)	24.5 (76.1)	22.3 (72.1)	22.8 (73.0)	24.3 (75.7)	24.8 (76.6)	23.7 (74.7)	22.6 (72.7)	24.4 (75.9)
Daily mean °C (°F)	13.4 (56.1)	15.1 (59.2)	18.0 (64.4)	21.0 (69.8)	21.3 (70.3)	20.9 (69.6)	19.7 (67.5)	20.0 (68.0)	20.5 (68.9)	19.8 (67.6)	17.4 (63.3)	14.3 (57.7)	18.5 (65.2)
Mean daily minimum °C (°F)	4.1 (39.4)	6.1 (43.0)	9.5 (49.1)	13.9 (57.0)	16.7 (62.1)	17.4 (63.3)	17.2 (63.0)	17.3 (63.1)	16.8 (62.2)	14.9 (58.8)	11.1 (52.0)	6.0 (42.8)	12.6 (54.7)
Record low °C (°F)	−2.0 (28.4)	0.1 (32.2)	3.5 (38.3)	9.0 (48.2)	9.6 (49.3)	12.6 (54.7)	14.8 (58.6)	15.0 (59.0)	12.0 (53.6)	10.2 (50.4)	1.3 (34.3)	−1.3 (29.7)	−2.0 (28.4)
Average rainfall mm (inches)	2.7 (0.11)	5.9 (0.23)	9.6 (0.38)	57.1 (2.25)	171.9 (6.77)	178.3 (7.02)	213.0 (8.39)	290.9 (11.45)	280.7 (11.05)	175.6 (6.91)	75.5 (2.97)	10.0 (0.39)	1,471.2 (57.92)
Source: Norwegian Meteorological Institute
