= Khun Tan =

Khun Tan may refer to:

- Khun Tan (mystic), a Pa-O religious figure in Myanmar
- Thai: ทิวเขาขุนตาน
  - Khun Tan Range
  - Doi Khun Tan National Park
  - Khun Tan Tunnel, the longest railway tunnel in Thailand in Lampang and Lamphun provinces
  - Khun Tan Station, the highest railway station in Thailand
- Thai: ทิวเขาขุนตาล, after "Tan" (ตาล), the Borassus flabellifer palm tree
  - Khun Tan District in Chiang Rai province
  - Khun Tan River, Chiang Rai province
