= Kalaw–Loikaw Railway =

Railway line in Myanmar

Kalaw-Loikaw Railway ကလော-လွိုင်ကော် ရထားလမ်း
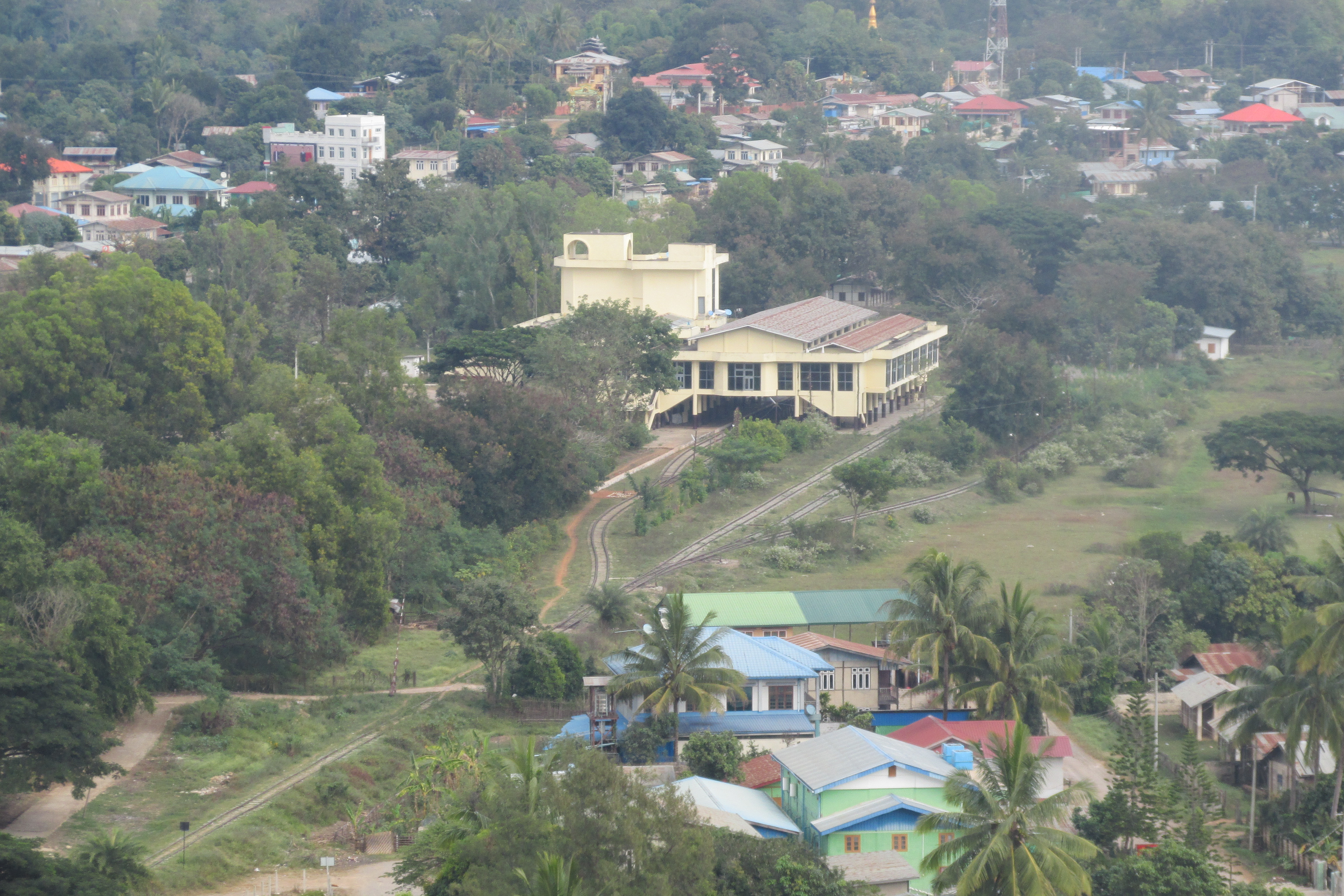
- Loikaw Station

Overview
- Owner: Myanma Railways
- Locale: Kalaw - Loikaw
- Number of stations: 35

Operation
- Began operation: Jan 27, 1993

Technical
- System length: 102.2 m
- Track gauge: 1,000 mm (3 ft 3 3/8 in)

Kalaw–Loikaw Railway is a 1000 mm (3 ft 3 3/8 in) metre-gauge railway connecting Kalaw to Loikaw, the capital of Kayah State. The line was constructed to link Aungban Station with the towns of Pinlaung and Loikaw, spanning a total length of 102 kilometers. Major stations along the route include Kalaw Station, Pinlaung Station, and Loikaw Station.

== History ==
Construction from Aungban Station began in 1990. The Aungban-Pinlaung section was inaugurated on January 7, 1993, followed by the opening of the Pinlaung-Loikaw section on January 27, 1993.

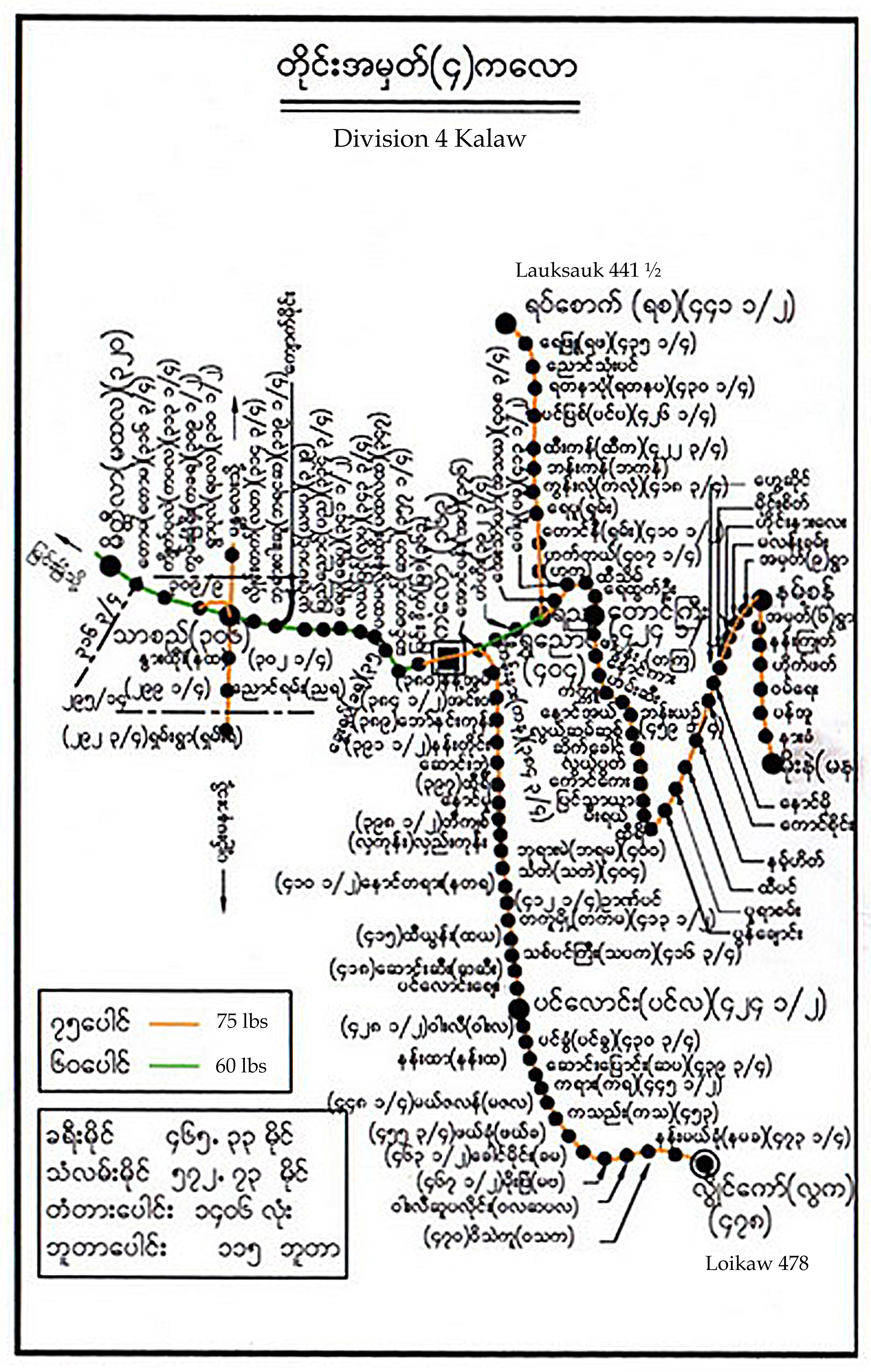
Myanmar Railways station map Division 4 Kalaw

== Stations ==
- (1) Kalaw 369
- (18) Aungpan 376 (Junction) to Lawksawk, Moene
- (19) Nan On 380
- (20) In Wun 384 1/2
- (21) Baw Nin Gon 389
- (22) Nan Taing 391 1/2
- (23) Chaung Pwet -
- (24) Ton 397
- (25) Nawng Mun -
- (26) Hti Ji 398 1/2
- (27) Hle Gon -
- (28) Bu Ya Me 400
- (29) Ta Te 404
- (30) Naungtayar 410 1/2
- (31) Nye Pin 412 1/4
- (32) Ta Ku Myo 413 1/2
- (33) Hti Yun 415
- (34) Thit Pin Gyi 416 3/4
- (35) Saung Hsi 418
- (36) Pin Laung Ze -
- (37) Pinlaung 424 1/2
- (38) Wa Lee 428 1/2
- (39) Pin Hkun 430 3/4
- (40) Nan Hat -
- (41) Hsaung Pyaung 439 3/4
- (42) Ka Ya 445 1/2
- (43) Me Za Lan 448 1/4
- (44) Ka The 453
- (45) Pe Kon 455 3/4
- (46) Hkaung Mong 463 1/2
- (47) Mong Pya 467 1/2
- (48) Wa Li Su Pa Laing -
- (49) Wi The Ku 470
- (50) Nan Me Hkun 473 1/4
- (51) Loikaw 478
