= Khun Sar Doon =

Pa'O musician (1943–1978)

- ခွန်သာဒွန်း
- Khun Sar Doon
- Born: Khun Sar Doon; 6 October 1943; Pharmong village, Taunggyi,Myanmar
- Died: 14 November 1978 (aged 35); Hsi Hseng, Myanmar
- Education: Kingswood High School, Kalaw, Veterinary College (Insein campus), Yangon
- Occupations: Musician; composer; Politician
- Known for: Singer
- Spouse: Nang Sann Kyi
- Children: Khun Thein, Khun Banyar, Nang Thar Thar Htwaye
- Parents: Hein Maung (father); Nang Long (mother)

Khun Thar Doon (Burmese: ခွန်သာဒွန်း; 6 October 1943 – 14 November 1978) was a Pa'O musician and composer. He was the founder of Myo Khun Kho and Gowtiemom Band, the first music bands in the modern Pa'O history. He recorded four cassette tapes and composed several number of Pa'O songs. He is the creator of "Tee Ree Ree Rayork" and "Zinglar Khum Be", the popular Pa'O songs.

== Early life and education ==
Khun Thar Doon was born on 6 October 1943 in Pharmong village, Taunggyi Township, Southern Shan State, Myanmar. He was the second son of general Hein Maung, the leader of formerly Pa'O ethnic armed organization (P.N.O) and Nang Long. At the age of seven, Khun Thar Doon was sent to Kingswood High School, Kalaw (a Methodist mission school, located in Kalaw, Myanmar) by his father. He studied in Kalaw until he had passed ninth grade. It was Methodist mission school that trained Khun Thar Doon to be a good musician. He passed the matriculation at No.2 Basic Education High School, Taunggyi. In 1966, he studied at the University of Veterinary Science, Insein, Rangoon, Myanmar and got the BVSc degree in 1972.

== Repertoire ==
Khun Thar Doon's greatest song was "Pa'O Swe" (national song) ("ပအိုဝ်ႏသွီႏ" (in Pa'o Karen)) which aimed to revive patriotism among the Pa'O people. One of the most popular songs he had composed was "Tee Ree Ree Rayock" ("တီးရီးရီးရျော့" (in Pa'o Karen)) in honour of ceremonies of novitiation. Some popular love songs he composed were "Sa Moonum", "Pun Orngsitja", "Gum Kayongpay", "Ruckel Htengse" and "Gawthimom" (that is also one of the bands name he founded). "Nong Rawee", "Zinglar Khumbe" ("သေင်ႏလာႏခံႏဗီႏ" (in Pa'o Karen)), "Myo Khun Kho" (also a band name) are some revitalising patriotism songs he had composed. He also composed an ethnic solidarity song named "Khum Rung Sar".

== Death ==
Khun Thar Doon was killed in Hsi Hseng on the night of 14 November 1978 by an Ethnic armed group. He was killed at the age of 35. His wife and children survived.
