= Namneng =

Namneng နမ်းနိမ့်
- Village
- Location in Myanmar (Burma)
- Coordinates: 19°54′04″N 96°50′04″E
- Country: Myanmar
- State: Shan State
- District: Pa'O Self-Administered Zone
- Township: Pinlaung Township
- Village tract: Lonepyin village tract
- Time zone: UTC+6.30 (MMT)

Namneng (Burmese: နန်းနိမ့်) is a village in the Lonepyin village tract, Pinlaung Township, Pa'O Self-Administered Zone of Myanmar.

On 11 March 2023, Namneng became the site of the Pinlaung massacre, during which Myanmar Army troops killed at least 30 civilians, including 3 Buddhist monks.
