= Leinli Bridge =

- Coordinates: 19.9910°N 96.6163°E
- Carries: Naypyitaw and Pinlaung Road (2 lanes), 2 pedestrian walk lanes
- Crosses: Paung Laung River
- Locale: Shan State, Myanmar
- Official name: Leinli Bridge
- Maintained by: State Peace and Development Council, Ministry of Transportation

Characteristics
- Design: Steel truss suspension
- Total length: 1760 feet
- Width: 28 feet
- Height: 274 feet

History
- Opened: 5 November 2010

Leinli Bridge is a steel truss suspension that spans the Paung Laung River in Shan State, Myanmar. It carries Nay Pyi Taw and Pinlaung Roads. The Leinli Bridge is the highest suspension bridge in Myanmar.

== History ==
The Leinli Bridge was completed in 2010 at a cost of $3.476 million in foreign currency and an additional Ks.14,50,00,00,000/-. Before the bridge was built, Merchants from Naypyidaw, southern, and western Myanmar who wanted trade with the Shan and Pa'O farmers and ethnic tribes in the fertile Pinlaung Township were required to go up and around the dangerous roads of Elephant Mountain (Sin Taung) and cross the Paung Laung River by boat.

To unite the areas and ease travel and commerce, Myanmar's State Peace and Development Council contracted P.T.Waagner-Biro Indonesia together with Supreme Group of Companies to erect the bridge over the Paung Laung River. They chose a spot at mile post No. 42/ 5 on Nay Pyi Taw- Pinlaung Road near Leinli Village of Pinlaung Township, in Southern Shan State

The bridge, designed by the People’s Republic of China, was finally open to the public on 5 November 2010. The bridge is a 1,760 ft × 1,000 ft (540 m × 300 m) long main bridge and approach bridges each 380 feet (120 m) long. The 274 ft (84 m)-high bridge was built at a cost of $3.476 million in foreign currency plus Ks.14,50,00,00,000/-. The motor way is 28 feet wide flanked by three feet wide pedestrian. The bridge can withstand 75- ton loads.

== Detail ==
Difficult geologic and environmental conditions at the bridge site as well as a demanding construction time schedule restricted construction of the bridge. The main truss of the bridge utilizes a Warren truss with vertical members. In addition, the vertical tension-compression bearings are arranged at both ends of the truss. The towers are of the inward inclined portal frames, of which the lower tower columns are concrete and the upper columns are steel box columns. The anchorage blocks are gravity blocks and each main cable is made up of 24 nos.of 91-φ5.2 mm galvanized high-strength parallel steel wire strands. The bridge was constructed via truck crane lifting, cable-supported hoisting, and installation on scaffolding.
