= Aung Kham Hti =

Burmese politician (born 1936)

Wunna Kyawhtin U Aung Kham Hti
- အောင်ခမ်းထီ
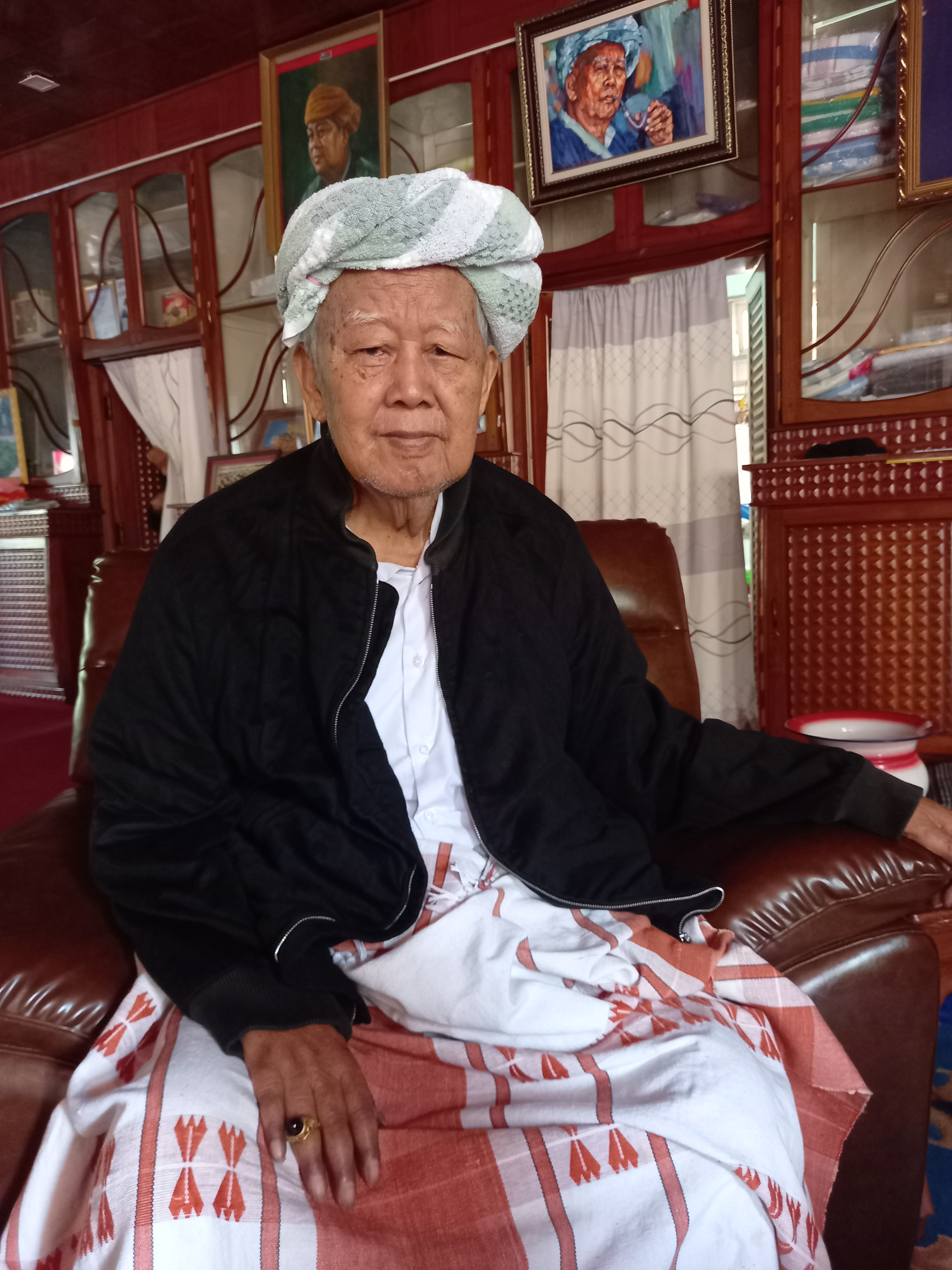
- Official portrait, 2023

Chairman of the Pa-O National Organisation
- Incumbent
- Assumed office 1976
- Preceded by: Position established

Leader of the Pa-O National Army
- Incumbent
- Assumed office Unknown or ca. 2008
- Preceded by: Unknown

Personal details
- Born: Khun Kee; 27 April 1936 (age 90) Thilone Village, Shan State, British Burma (present-day Myanmar)
- Party: PNO
- Spouse: Nang Pyu
- Children: 6

Military service
- Allegiance: Pa-O National Army
- Years of service: 1976–present
- Rank: Commander-in-chief
- Battles/wars: Myanmar conflict; Myanmar civil war (2021–present)

U Aung Kham Hti (Note: Burmese: အောင်ခမ်းထီ, romanized: aaung hkam hte) (born Khun Kee; (Note: Burmese: ခွန်ကီး, romanized: hkwan khee) 27 April 1936) is a Burmese politician and former monk who has been the chairman of the Pa-O National Organisation (PNO) since 1976. Having served in this role for 49 years, Aung Kham Hti has been one of Myanmar's longest-serving ethnic leaders.

On 11 April 1991, the PNO, under his leadership, agreed a ceasefire with the ruling State Law and Order Restoration Council. The PNO was granted a number of business concessions and control over some territory in the southwest Shan State, which later became known as the Shan State (South) Special Region-6. In April 2022, after the 2021 Myanmar coup d'état, Aung Kham Hti was awarded the title of Wunna Kyawhtin.

== See also ==
- Pa-O people
- Myanmar conflict
