= Pa-O National Organisation =

Pa-O National Organisation ပအိုဝ်း အမျိုးသား အဖွဲ့ချုပ်
- Abbreviation: PNO
- Chairman: Khun Aung Kham Hti
- Founded: 1949
- Headquarters: Taunggyi, Shan State; Pa-O Self-Administered Zone (controlled territory)
- Ideology: Pa-O interests Buddhist nationalism Ultranationalism
- Colours: Blue, green, red
- Seats in the Amyotha Hluttaw: 1 / 224
- Seats in the Pyithu Hluttaw: 3 / 440
- Seats in the Shan State Hluttaw: 6 / 151

Party flag

Website
- www.pa-onational.org

The Pa-O National Organisation (PNO; Burmese: ပအိုဝ်း အမျိုးသား အဖွဲ့ချုပ်, romanized: paaow aamyoesarr aahpwalhkyaote) is a Pa-O political party in Myanmar (Burma). Its armed wing, the Pa-O National Army, has between 400 and 700 active personnel. The PNO administers the Pa-O Self-Administered Zone, which consists of three townships in southern Shan State: Hopong, Hsi Hseng, and Pinlaung townships.

The PNO claims to represent the Pa-O people and promotes agricultural and work programmes across its controlled territory, in additional to building schools and hospitals in the area. The organisation's armed wing, the Pa-O National Army (PNA), is a close ally of the Burmese military, while PNO itself has close ties to the military-backed Union Solidarity and Development Party.
