= Hopong Township =

Hopong Township ဟိုပုန်းမြို့နယ် ဝေင်ꩻနယ်ႏဟိုပုံꩻ
- Township
- Location (red) in the Pa-O Self-Administered Zone
- Coordinates: 20°47′N 97°11′E
- Country: Myanmar
- State: Shan State
- Division: Pa-O Self-Administered Zone
- Capital: Hopong

Area
  - Total: 1,220.56 sq mi (3,161.2 km^{2})

Population (2023)
  - Total: 22,756
  - Density: 18.644/sq mi (7.1985/km^{2})
- Time zone: UTC+6:30 (MMT)

Hopong Township (Burmese: ဟိုပုန်းမြို့နယ်) (Pa'o Karen: ဝေင်ꩻနယ်ႏဟိုပုံꩻ) is the capital township of Pa-O Self-Administered Zone in the Shan State of Myanmar (Burma). The principal town is Hopong.

Hopong has numerous tourist destinations, such as Htam Sam Cave and Mway Taw Pagoda. Many visitors from different parts of the country enjoy going to Htam Sam Cave, which is not only a beauty spot for nature lovers, but also a place with numerous Buddha images which attract many Buddhist pilgrimages. Near the cave, moreover, free delicious vegetarian meal is served which is well worth enjoying. Mway Taw Pagoda is an impressive pagoda in the centre of the town which is the most significant religious site in Hopong.

Hopong township is controlled by the Pa-O National Organisation, who ramped up taxes and conscription in the township in 2024 and 2025 during the current phase of the Myanmar civil war. The entered into conflict with the Pa-O National Liberation Army (PNLA) in early 2024 after tensions between the junta and the PNLA.
