= Phoe Ta Khit =

Burmese hermit (b. 1977)

- ဖိုးတခေတ်
- Born: Saw Kyaw Hla Than; 7 December 1977 (age 48); Kawmahnote village, Hpa-An, Myanmar
- Education: University of Distance Education, Yangon
- Occupations: hermit, shaman
- Parent(s): Saw Hla Tin; Nan Aye Tin

Phoe Ta Khit (Burmese: ဖိုးတခေတ်, also spelt Pho Ta Khit; born Saw Kyaw Hla Than on 7 December 1977) was a Karen hermit, shaman, spiritual leader and mystic known for his works on "Phoe Ta Khit religious movement" and Buddhist religious buildings in a remote corner of Hpa-An, Kayin State, Myanmar.

== Early life ==
Phoe Ta Khit was born on 7 December 1978 in Kawmahnote village, Hpa-An, Kayin State to parents Saw Hla Tin and his wife Nan Aye Tin of a Karen ethnic family. He is the second son of four siblings. He graduated in BA Law from University of Distance Education, Yangon in 2014.

== Hermit life and religious movements ==
Saw Kyaw Hla Than became a hermit at 17 years old. His works on Karen maintain cultural traditions, Phoe Ta Khit religious movement and Buddhist religious buildings in a remote corner of Hpa-An, Kayin State. Phoe Ta Khit rules over 500 people who believe in his powers as a shaman. He believes that he has a connection with the spirits of the past eight monarchs, each of them one of his previous existences. Everyday life in the village and barely above the subsistence level is entirely organised by Phoe Ta Khit, the eccentric and the supernatural, others believe people respect to Phoe Ta Khit as a spiritual leader. During the Karen new year, he is one of the leaders of organizing the ceremony. On the third day of the ceremony he went around the village riding the ox cart to meet the worshipers. Some Karen People believe that a touch of "Phoe Ta Khit" can heal any kind of illness and diseases and crowded to meet with him.

During Phoe Ta Khit Birthday Festival, local villages in Kayin State and Mon State, Bago Region of other ethnic tribes come festival annual visit to a population of about 7000 people usually celebrate.
