= Kingswood High School, Kalaw =

Former highschool in Shan State, Myanmar

Coordinates: 20°37′11.4″N 96°33′41.6″E

Kingswood High School
- Kalaw, Shan State; Myanmar

Information
- Type: Public
- Established: 1928
- Grades: K-10

Kingswood High School was a Methodist mission school, located in Kalaw, Myanmar. It was opened in 1928 and named after the first Methodist school founded by John Wesley at Kingswood near Bristol (UK) in 1748.

The school compound was big, each building built on a small hill separated by flat grassland, football, and indoor and outdoor basketball fields. The tennis court was in a small valley surrounded by low hills not far from the main buildings. Hostels for boarding students were farther away: Boys’ and girls’ hostels were on separate low hills within the walking distance from each other.

Kingswood High School was nationalized by the military government of General Ne Win in April 1966. The students and teachers were transferred to the Kalaw Government High School and the school building was later used to house the Kalaw GTI (Government Technology Institute). After the 1989, the SLORC military government transferred the Kalaw GTI to Taunggyi, and the school building and its vast compound was used for the Defence Services Command and General Staff College - DSCGSC (Kalaw).
