= Pinlaung Township =

Township in Shan State, Myanmar

Coordinates: 20°07′27.8″N 96°46′55.9″E

Pinlaung Township ပင်လောင်းမြို့နယ်
- Township
- Pinlaung Township
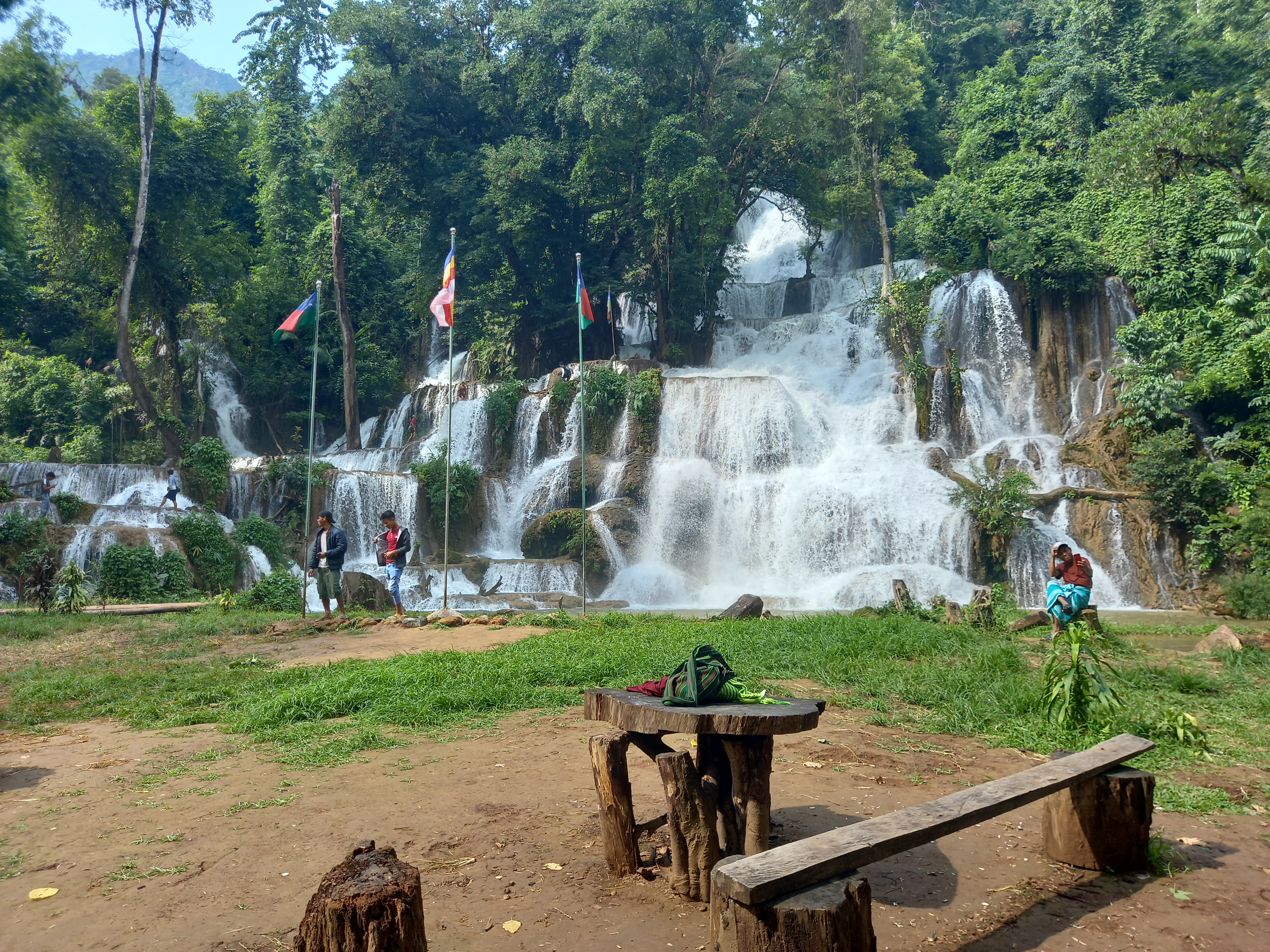
- Harr Waterfall, Pinlaung Township

- Location (red) in the Pa-O Self-Administered Zone
- Country: Myanmar
- State: Shan State
- District: Pa-O Self-Administered Zone
- Capital: Pinlaung

Area
  - Total: 3,395 km^{2} (1,311 sq mi)

Population (2014)
  - Total: 192,257
  - Density: 56.63/km^{2} (146.7/sq mi)
- Time zone: UTC6:30 (MMT)

Pinlaung Township (Burmese: ပင်လောင်းမြို့နယ်) is a township of the Pa-O Self-Administered Zone in the Shan State of Myanmar. Its principal town is Pinlaung. According to the 2014 Myanmar Population and Housing Census, there are 115,047 residents in the township.

== History ==
On 11 March 2023, the village of Namneng became the site of the Pinlaung massacre, during which Myanmar Army troops killed at least 30 civilians, including 3 Buddhist monks.

== Wildlife ==
Inle Lake and Inlay Lake Wetland Sanctuary, a well known tourist place and bird watching site, partly lies in this township.

This township is home to two endemic rare species of trapdoor spider, the Liphistius Birmanicus and Liphistius Lordae. After first being discovered by an American scientist in 1897, the spiders were again spotted in Pyin Oo Lwin and Taunggyi.

== Economy ==
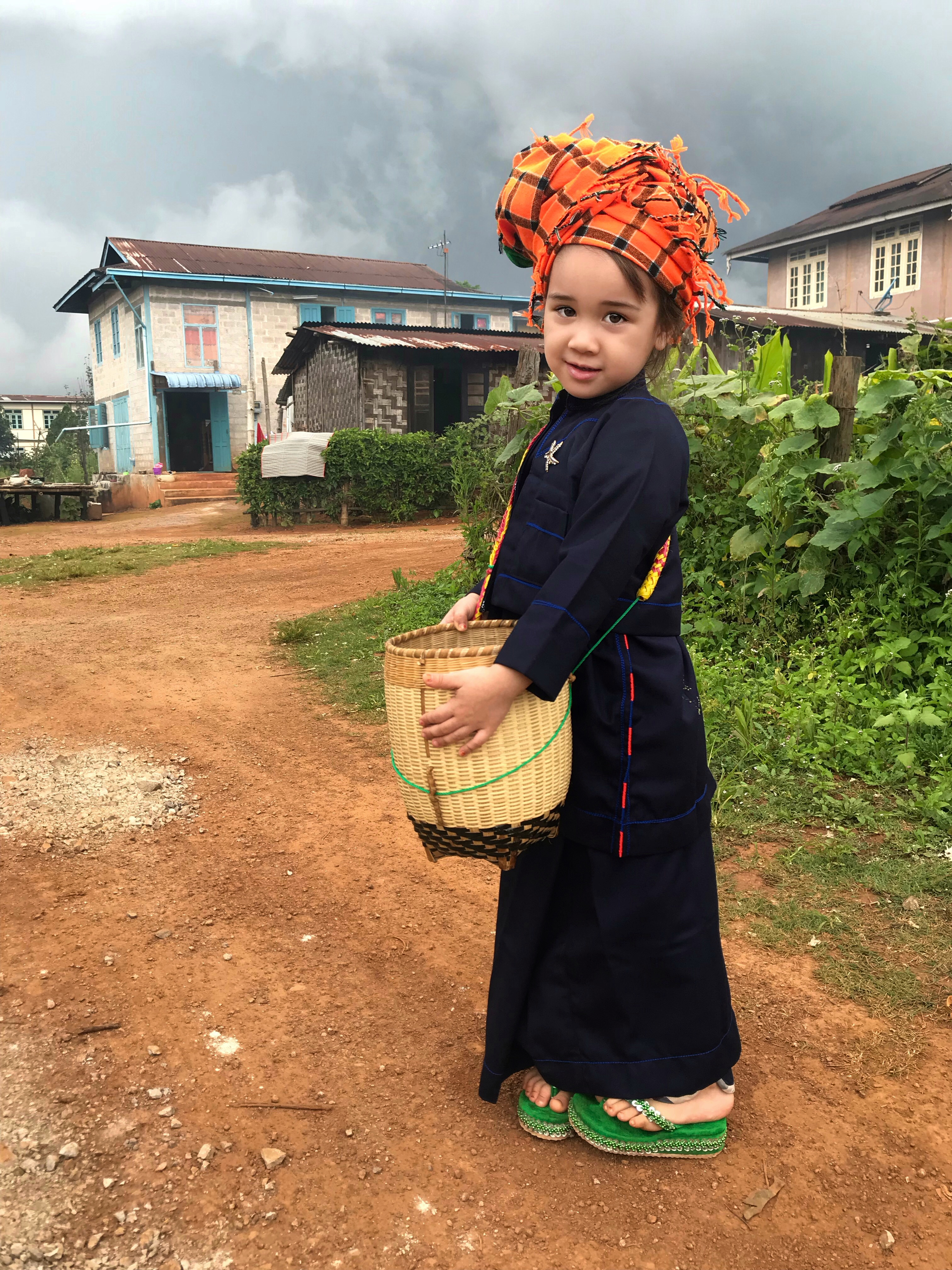
Girl in Pa'O traditional dress on a potato farm in Pinlaung, Pinlaung Township, Shan State, Myanmar (Pa'O Self-Administered Zone)

The township is home to the Tigyit coal-fired power plant, one of three coal-fired power plants in Myanmar.

Pinlaung Township accounts for the largest area of tea cultivation in southern Shan State. The Tea grown here is of the Assamica cultivar. Tea plantations in the area cover 12,000 acres, with half of the cultivation taking place in the higher elevations of Le Hlaung, 10 miles from Pinlaung. In the Koe Khaung ward, tea production is refined and the tea coming from the nearly 100 tea-producing households is highly sought after. Farmers here use stoves with chimneys and clean pans for roasting, which creates a smoother teat that fetches higher prices than other teas in the region.

Traditionally, farmers in Pinlaung Township made a living mostly off of poppy production, but have expressed interest in recent years of veering away from such farming and switching to substitute crops. In 2017, the Taung Yoe Ethnic Literature and Culture Association (Central) requested government assistance not only for the substitute seeds but also for pesticides in order to substitute cash crops

== Infrastructure ==
Before 2010, accessing Pinlaung Township was as dangerous as it was difficult. Merchants from Naypyidaw, southern, and western Myanmar who wanted trade with the Shan and Pa'O farmers and ethnic tribes in the areas were required to go up and around the dangerous roads of Elephant Mountain (Sin Taung) and cross the Paung Laung River by boat. Then, Myanmar's former government contracted P.T.Waagner-Biro Indonesia together with Supreme Group of Companies to construct an expansive steel truss suspension bridge to span the river. The bridge was designed by the People’s Republic of China. The bridge, known as the Leinli Bridge, would become the highest of its kind in Myanmar. The bridge was opened on November 5, 2010, at a cost of 3.476 million in foreign currency and an additional 14,500 million kyats.

In the fiscal year 2018-2019, the Ministry of Border Affairs spent 12,055.754 million kyats from the Union budget to improve 94 roads and bridges, 62 water access works, 11 power stations, and five religious missionary programs in Pinlaung Township.

== Caves ==
Pinlaung township is home to many large caves and cave systems. Among them are:

1. Namun Spring Cave in Namun
2. Road Cliff Cave in Leinli
3. Banana Forrest Cave, or Nga Pyaw Thor Cave in Nam Pam
4. War Lee Kwey Cavein Nam Pam
5. Lower Spider Cavein Nam Pam
6. Upper Spider Cavein Nam Pam
7. Big Bang Cave in Tar Kge
8. Buddha Head Cave in Nounbi
9. Young Twint Cave in Nounbi
10. Dragon Cave in Hlaings
11. Te Toke Taungin Phinton
12. Hti Ngut in Hti Hwali
13. Namun Spring Wall Cave in Namun
14. Yar Za Cave (Hti Bwar Cave) in Taung Hti Bwar
