= Hopong =

- Town
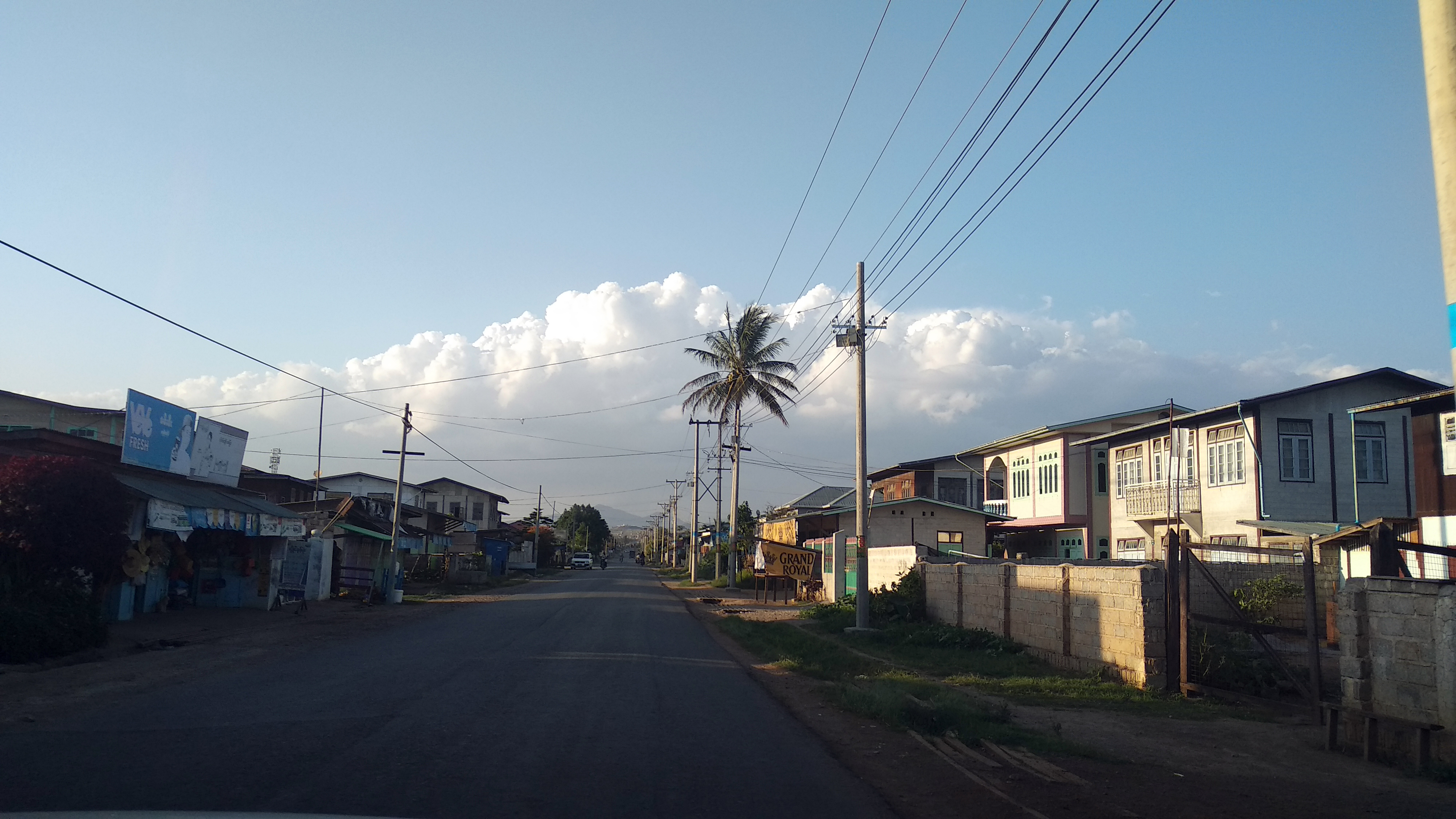

- Location in Burma
- Coordinates: 20°47′0″N 97°11′0″E
- Country: Myanmar
- State: Shan State
- Districts: Pa-O Self-Administered Zone
- Township: Hopong Township
- Elevation: 3,541 ft (1,079 m)

Population (2005)
  - Religions: Buddhism
- Time zone: UTC+6.30 (MMT)

Hopong (Burmese: ဟိုပုန်းမြို့, Pa'o Karen: ဝေင်ꩻဟိုပုံꩻ) is a town in the Shan State of southern Myanmar (Burma). Hopong is the capital of Pa'O Self-Administered Zone. It is located in Hopong Township.

Hopong has some locally known places, like Htam Sam Cave and Mway Taw Pagoda.
