= Pa'O Self-Administered Zone =

Coordinates: 20°47′39″N 97°10′24″E

Pa-O Self-Administered Zone ပအိုဝ်းကိုယ်ပိုင်အုပ်ချုပ်ခွင့်ရဒေသ ပအိုဝ်ႏနမ်းပဲင်ႏအိုပ်ချုတ်ခွင်ꩻလꩻဒေႏသ
- Self-administered zone
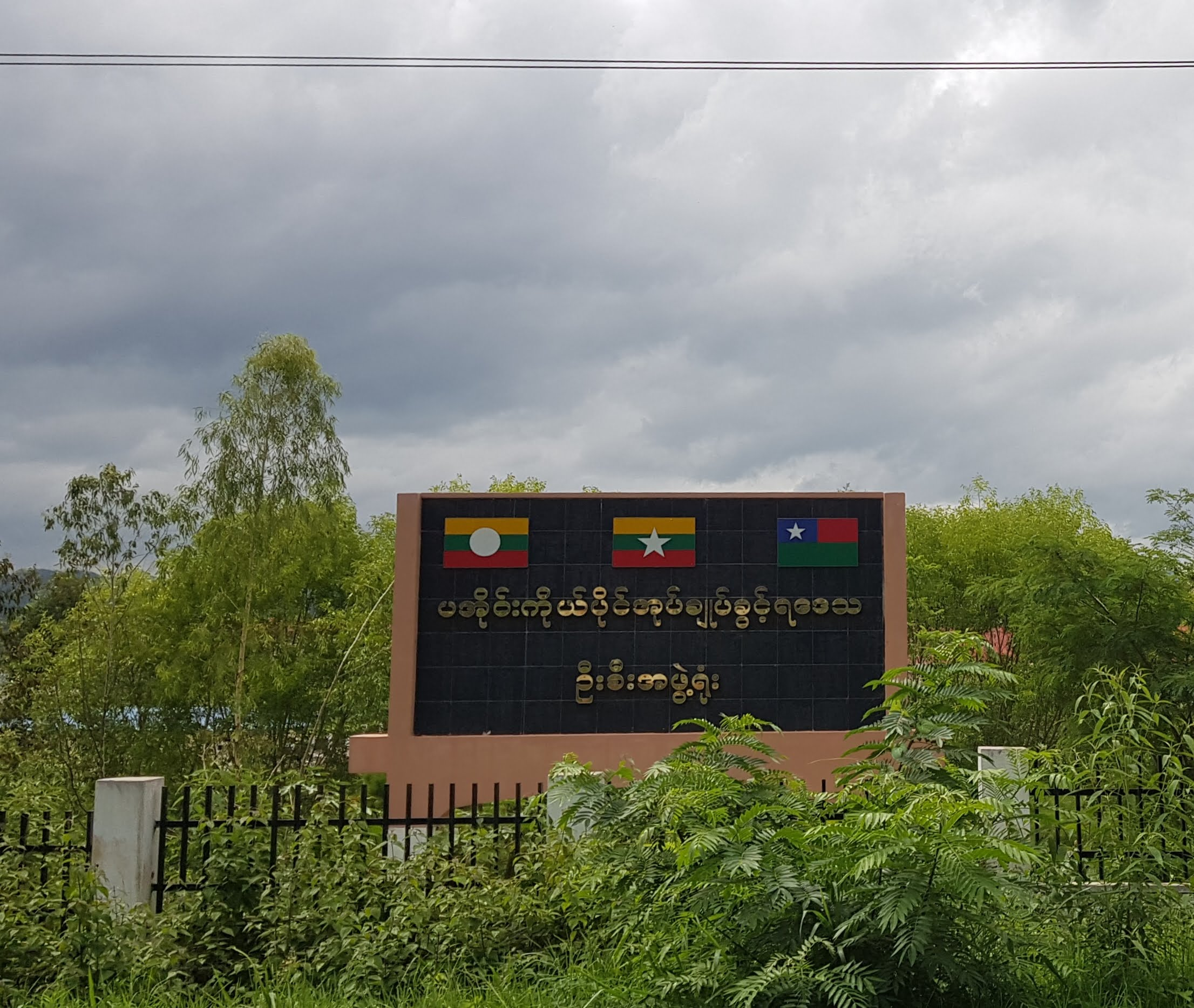
- Headquarters of the Leading Body

- Flag

- Location in Shan State
- Country: Myanmar
- State: Shan State
- No. of Townships: 3
- Capital: Hopong

Area
  - Total: 8,386 km^{2} (3,238 sq mi)
- Elevation: 1,079 m (3,541 ft)

Population (2008)
  - Total: 380,427
  - Density: 45.36/km^{2} (117.5/sq mi)
- Demonym: Pa'O
- Time zone: UTC+6.30 (MMT)

The Pa'O Self-Administered Zone (Burmese: ပအိုဝ်းကိုယ်ပိုင်အုပ်ချုပ်ခွင့်ရဒေသ; paaow kopine aotehkyaote hkwng r days) also abbreviated as Pa'O SAZ, as stipulated by the 2008 Constitution of Myanmar, is a self-administered zone consisting of three townships in Shan State.

== History ==
Pa'O SAZ's official name was announced by decree on 20 August 2010. Before 2010, it was the Special Region 6.

In the wake of the 2021 Myanmar coup d'état and ensuing civil war, Pa'O youths, like many throughout the country, formed and joined resistance forces like the Pa-O National Defence Force, in opposition to military rule.

On 24 February 2023, fighting began in Pinlaung Township, forcing more than 5,000 villagers to flee, including most villagers from Namneng. On 11 March 2023, the village of Namneng became the site of the Pinlaung massacre, during which Myanmar Army troops killed at least 30 civilians, including 3 Buddhist monks.

== Government and politics ==
The zone is currently under the de facto control of the Pa-O National Organisation. Constitutionally, the Pa'O Self-Administered Zone is led by the Leading Body of the Pa'O Self-Administered Zone, led by Chairman U Khun Phoe Sein.

The Leading Body has the power and authority for 10 areas of governance including public health, fire hazard prevention, water and electricity matters, etc. These powers were delegated to it by Schedule Three - List of Legislation of the Leading Body of Self-Administered Division or Self-Administered Area of the 2008 Constitution of Myanmar.

The Chairman of the Leading Body of Pa'O Self-Administered Zone, U Khun Phoe Sein, hosted a ceremony to mark the 38th Anniversary of the General Administration Department (GAD) in Hopong Township. During the ceremony, the chairman delivered an address where he noted the actions and duties of the GAD helped run the zone smoothly.

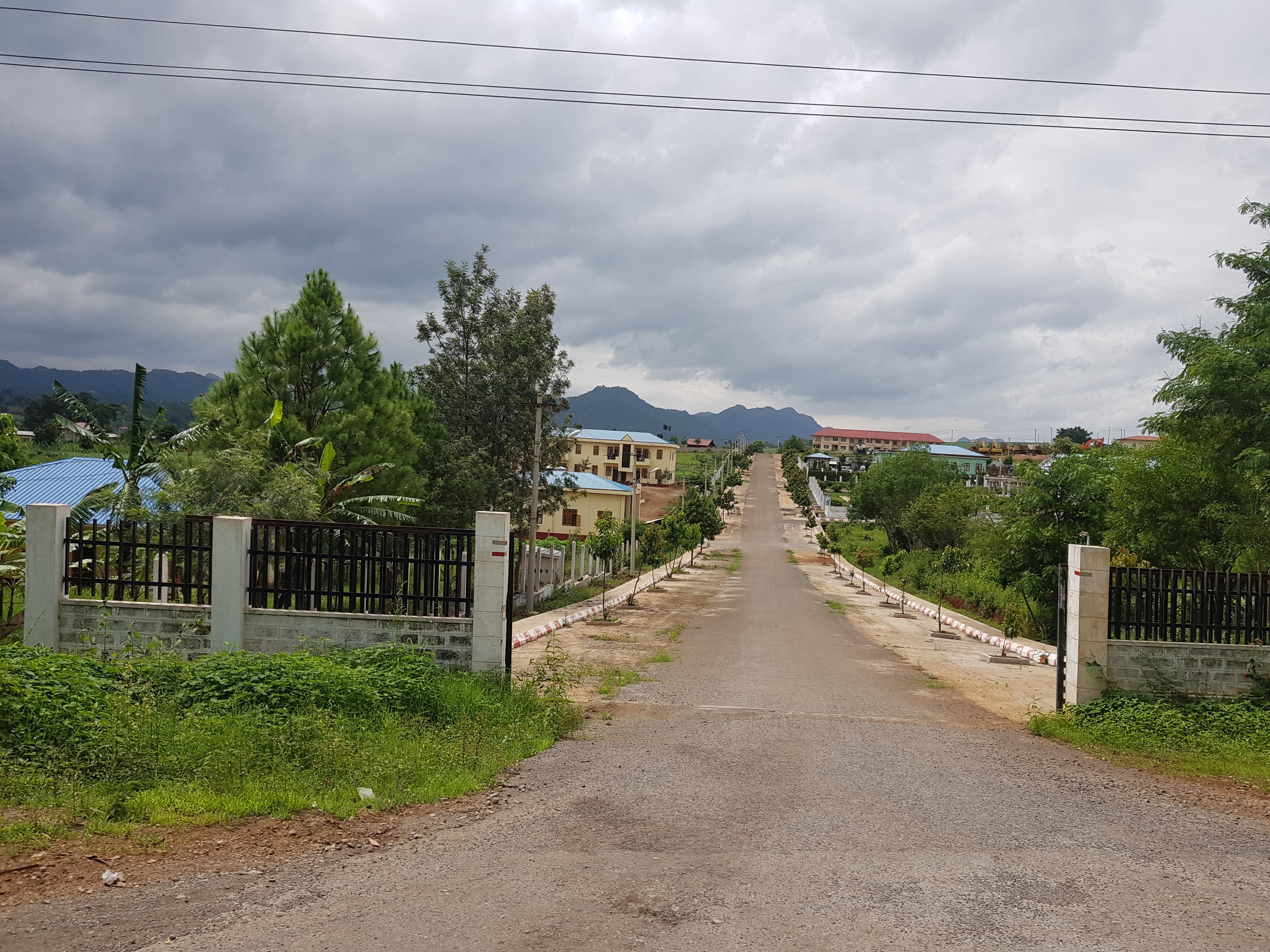
Headquarters of the Leading Body at Hopong

== Administrative divisions ==
townships of Pa'O SAZ Hsi Hseng Township Hopong Township Pinlaung Township

The Zone is divided into three townships- Hopong Township, Hsi Hseng Township and Pinlaung Township.
