= Pa'O people =

Ethnic group in Myanmar

Pa-O people
PAOH (~1948) Pa'o Karen: ပအိုဝ်ႏခွိုꩻ Burmese: ပအိုဝ်းလူမျိုး

Total population
- 857,000 (2020)

Regions with significant populations
- Myanmar

Languages
- Pa'O, Burmese

Religion
- Theravada Buddhism

Related ethnic groups
- Karen people, Karenni people, Kayan people

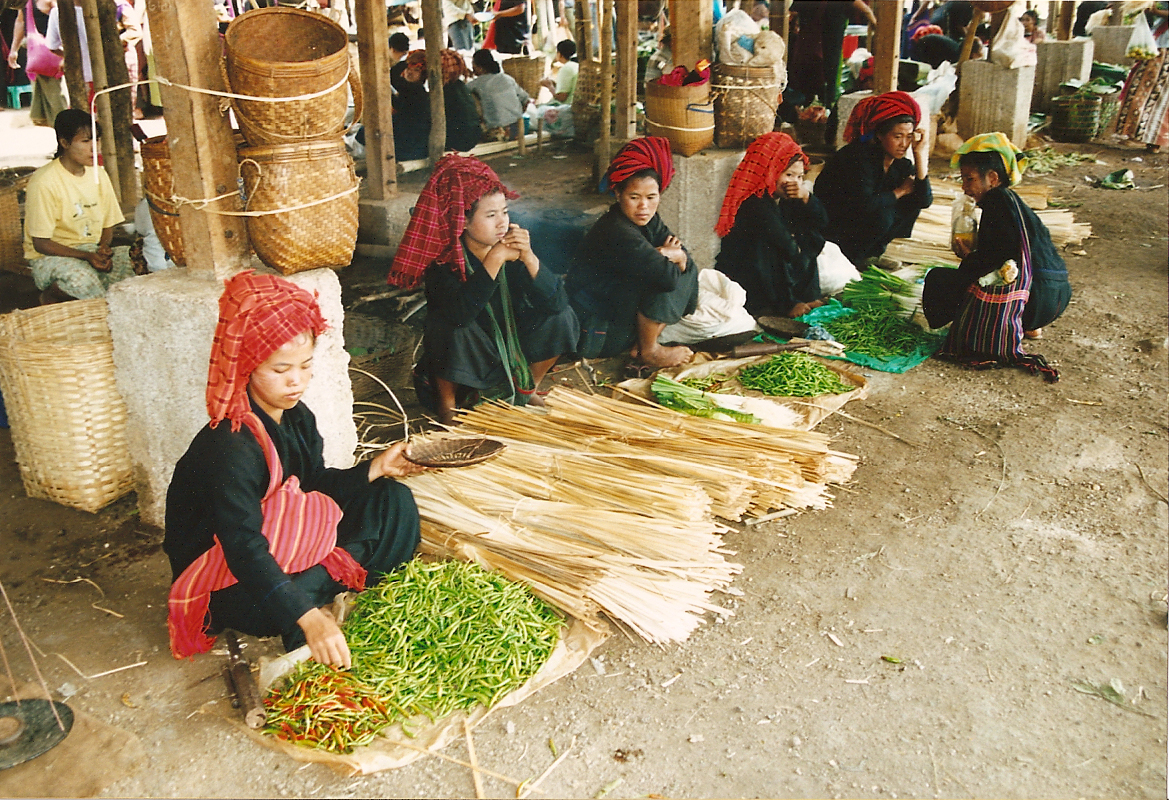
Pa'O women selling vegetables in an open-air market

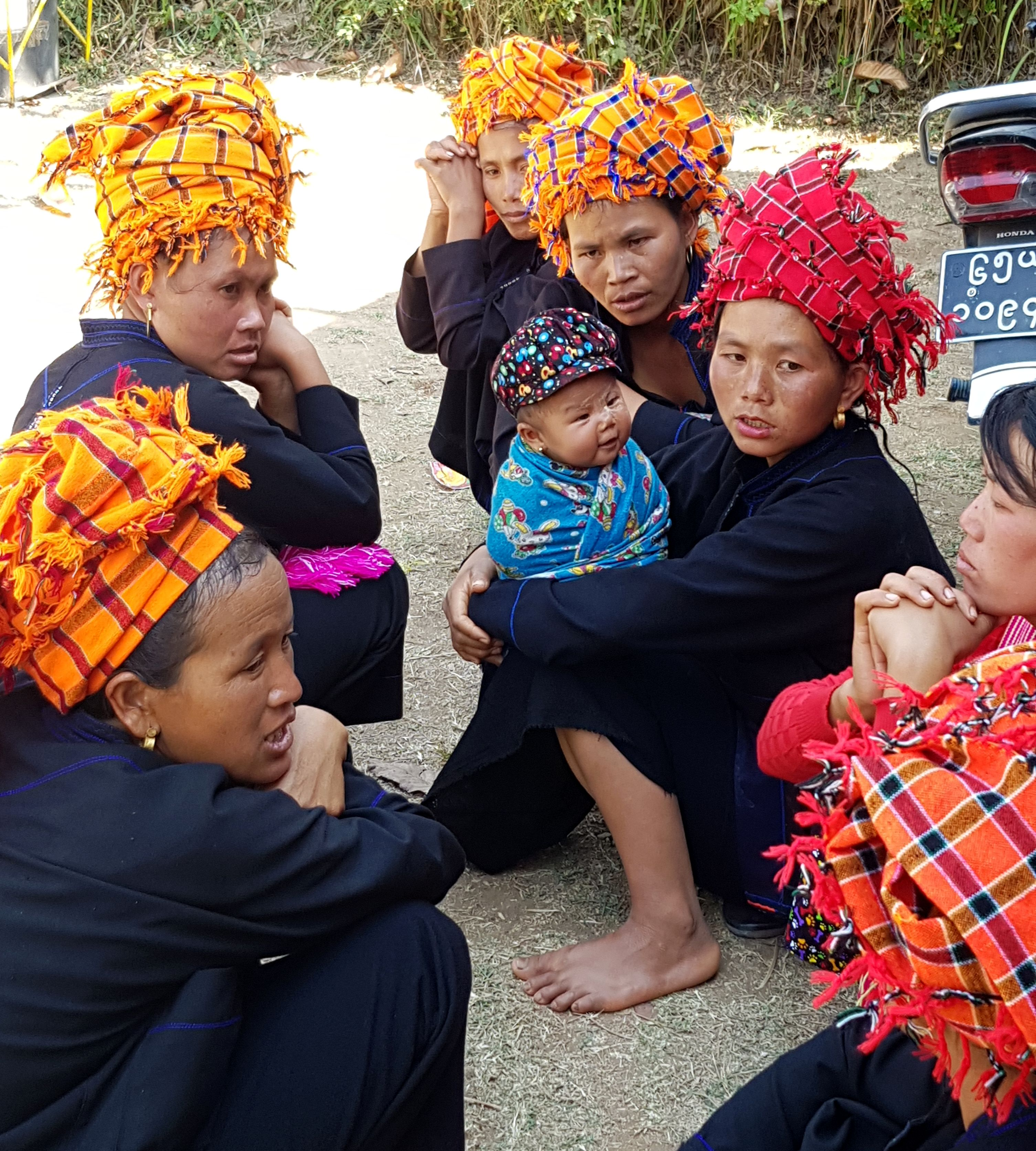
Pa'O women

The Pa'O (Pa'o Karen: ပအိုဝ်ႏလိုꩻမျိုꩻ; Burmese: ပအိုဝ်းလူမျိုး, IPA: [pəo̰ lùmjóʊ], or တောင်သူ; Shan: ပဢူဝ်း; Eastern Poe Karen: တံင်သူ; S'gaw Karen: တီသူ; also spelt Pa-O or Paoh) are a Karenic language-speaking ethnic group primarily inhabiting eastern Myanmar, especially Shan State.

Other names of the Pa'O include: PAOH, Pa-U, Pao, Tau-soo, Black Karen, and Taungthu.

== History ==
The Pa'O settled in the Thaton region of present-day Myanmar around 1700 BC. Historically, the Pa'O wore colourful clothing until King Anawratha defeated the Mon King, Makuta of Thaton(also called Manuha). The Pa'O were enslaved and forced to wear indigo-dyed clothing to signify their status.

== People ==
The Pa'O people are the second largest ethnic group in Shan State. They also reside in Kayin State, Kayah State, Mon State, and Bago Division. Many of the modern day Pa'O have fled to Mae Hong Son Province, in northern Thailand, due to ongoing military conflicts in Myanmar.

=== Subgroups ===
They consist of two distinct groups: the Lowland Pa'O, based in Thaton, and the Highland Pa'O, based in Taunggyi. It is believed that there are as many as twenty-four Pa'O subgroups.

The Pa'O subgroups are Htee Ree, Jamzam, Jauk Pa'O, Khrai, Khunlon, Khonlontanyar, Kon jam, Loi Ai, Padaung, Pahtom, Pa nae, Pan Nanm, Nan kay, Mickon, Miclan, Ta Kyor, Taret, Tahtwe, Tatauk, Taungthar, Tayam, Ta Noe, Warphrarei and Yin Tai.

== Agriculture ==
The Pa'O predominantly cultivate the leaves of the thanapet tree, onions, garlic, chili, potatoes, rice, peanuts, beans, sesame seeds, mustard leaves, and green tea.

== Culture ==
=== Fire Rocket Festival ===
The pwe lu-phaing (Fire Rocket Festival), is celebrated from April to July. The purpose of the festival is to bring ample rain to the villages during the planting season. According to Pa'O tradition, rockets are fired to help the clouds make rain. The village headman determines the size of the rockets. The largest rockets can contain up to 20 kilograms of gunpowder and have a range of 5–6 miles. The rockets, originally made from bamboo, are currently made from iron. Prior to firing, the rocket is carried once around the local temple on someone's shoulder. The festival also demonstrates the unity and friendship among different villages as they gather together for one week. "Pwe" means festival, "Lue" means donation and "Phaing" means to remove sins.

=== National Day ===
Pa'O National Day, or Den See Lar Bway, is celebrated on the full moon day of Tabaung, which falls in March. The National Day is a day to remember ancestors and past leaders, such as King Suriya Janthar, whose birthday is also celebrated on National Day. There is a grand parade through Taunggyi followed by a festival.

=== Religious beliefs ===
The majority of Pa'O people follow Buddhism, which means that most of their festivals are based on Buddhist festival days. Some Pa'O are Christian, and some maintain Animist beliefs. Poy Sang Long (Burmese: ရှင်ပြုပွဲ; Pa'o Karen: ပွယ်ꩻသျင်ႏလောင်ꩻ) celebrates the initiation of young boys as novice monks. On reaching adulthood, being ordained a monk is considered a family celebration. During Buddhist Lent, from August to October, Pa'O youth participate in the Pwe Lip May Bo (Pa'o Karen: ပွယ်ꩻလေပ်လူႏမေႏဗို; Burmese: မီးကြာလှည့်ပွဲ) ceremony. On the monthly full-moon nights, new-moon nights, and both half-moon nights, they surround their local temple with lanterns suspended on strings raised by supporting bamboo stands. The bamboo stands are used to carry the lanterns around the temple three times, the candles being lit as they are carried, as a show of respect to Buddha.

=== Origin Myth ===
The Pa'O origin myth states that they are descended from a shaman (weizza), and a female dragon.

=== Dress ===
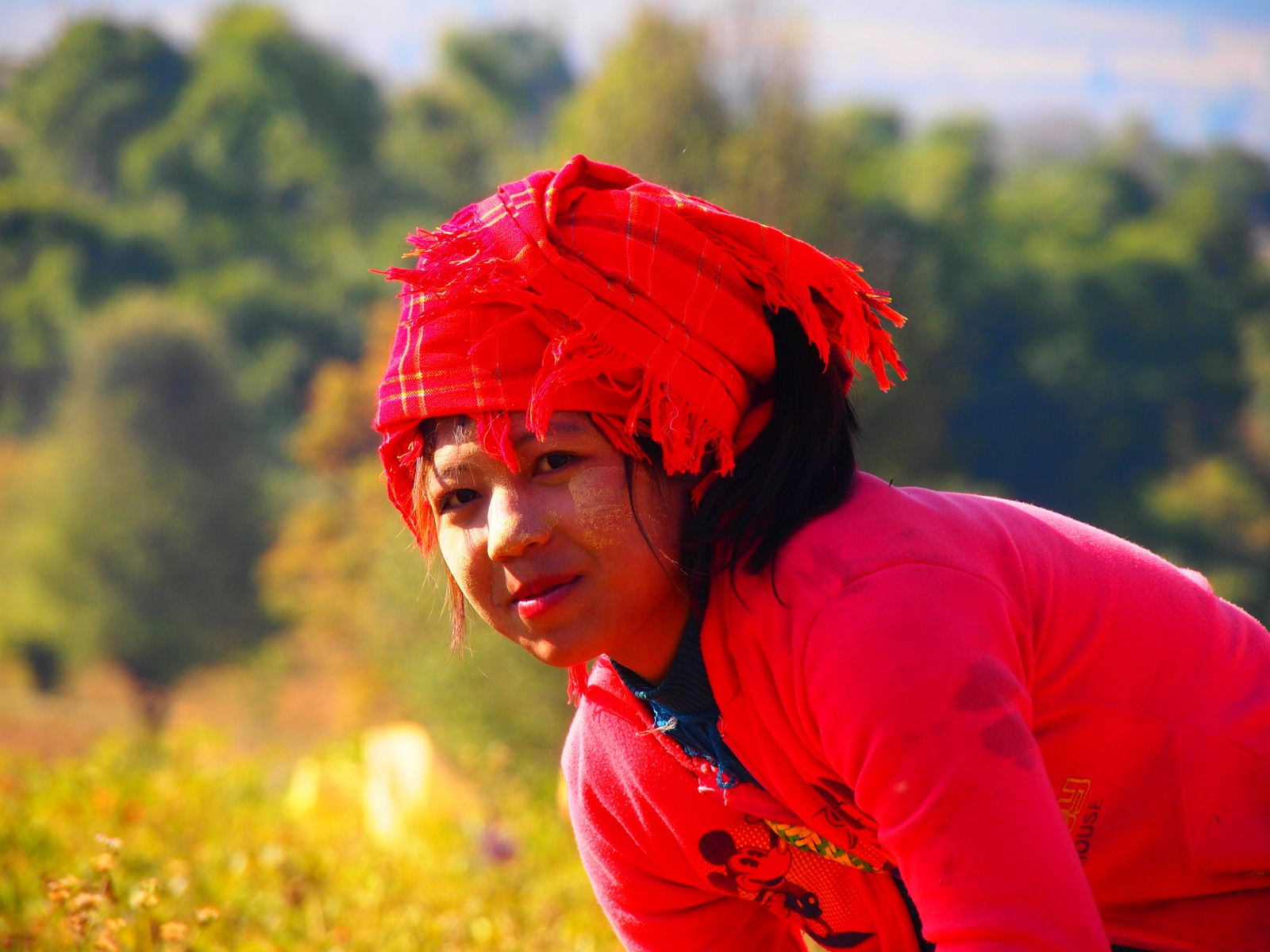
Pa'O woman harvesting chilies

The Pa'O people of upper Myanmar commonly wear black or navy blue. The traditional outfit of the Pa'O consists of a turban, a white shirt, black or navy jacket and long black trousers for men. The women's traditional Pa'O outfit consists of five pieces: a blouse, a jacket, a longyi that covers the knees, a turban, and two large, conical shaped hair pins. Both men and women pin a Pa'O flag badge on to their jacket. It represents the Zawgyi and dragon from their origin story. Men use a large red sling bag to carry knives, hoes or long choppers. Women use a cane or bamboo sling basket. Those from lower Myanmar wear Burmese style clothing.

=== Marriages ===
To initiate a marriage, first the young man's parents ask the young woman's parents for the hand of their daughter in marriage on behalf or their son. Her parents can take four or five days to discuss their daughter's wishes. According to custom, guests at the marriage ceremony tie cotton threads around the wrists of both the bridegroom and bride, joining them together while blessing the couple with their best wishes. Common presents include money, farmland, houses, buffaloes, male cows and household items.

=== Funerals ===
Villagers take care of funeral arrangements. The body is kept for a couple of nights at home. Food is cooked to offer to the monks and people play card games as a way of giving constant companionship to the departed. After two or three days, the family give praise to the person who died. Common people are buried, while monks are cremated.

=== Music ===
Khun Thar Doon (1940–1978) was one of the early recording stars of Pa'O music. He set up the first Pa'O modern band in the early 1970s. One of his famous songs is "Tee Ree Ree", a song about Pa'O solidarity. This song is still sung at traditional festivals today. He is on the cover of Guitars of the Golden Triangle: Folk and Pop Music of Myanmar (Burma), Vol. 2, published by Sublime Frequencies. Some of the artists appearing on the compilation cover songs he wrote. Some other artists may include Lashio Thein Aung, Saing Saing Maw, and Khun Paw Yann.

=== Political institutions ===
Aung Kham Hti is the leader of the Pa-O National Organization (PNO). The party currently has three representatives in the People's Assembly, one in the National Assembly and six in the Local Assembly. Khun San Lwin, a former member of the PNO, is currently Chairman of the Pa'O Self-Administered Zone.

== Notable Pa'O ==
- Thamanya Sayadaw, Buddhist monk
- Aung Kham Hti, leader of the PNO (Pa-O National Organization)
- Kyaing Kyaing, wife of Than Shwe

Entertainment

- Khun Sar Doon, composer and singer
- Nang Khin Zay Yar, Miss Myanmar International (2012)
- Naw Phaw Eh Htar, actress and model
- Billy La Min Aye, singer-songwriter
