= Myanmar civil war (2021–present) =

Ongoing armed conflict in Southeast Asia

- Part of the Myanmar conflict
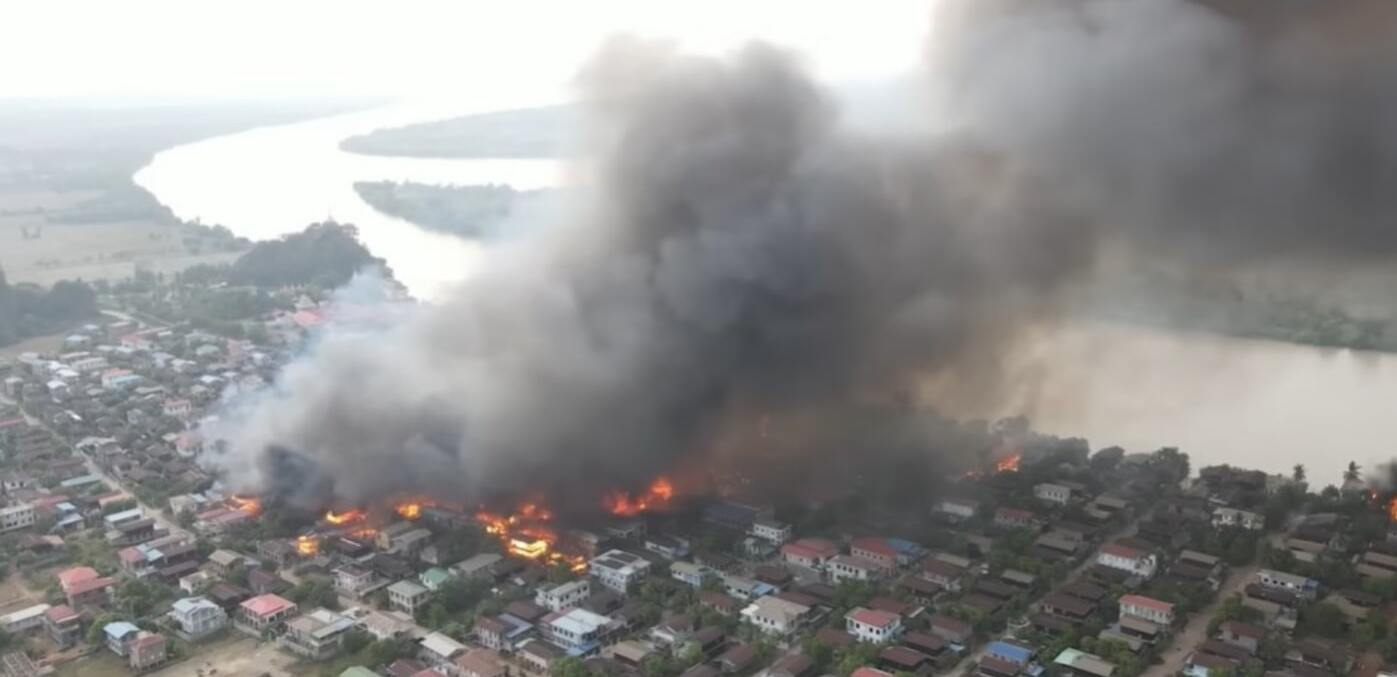
- Kyaikmaraw Township bombed by the SAC Military situation as of 12 August 2026 Legend: Tatmadaw and allies: Tatmadaw and paramilitaries (Note: Border Guard Forces, Pyusawhti militias, Shanni Nationalities Army, Wuyang People's Militia, Khaunglanhpu People’s Militia, Rohingya militia, several India-based insurgent groups, smaller allied ethnic armed organisations, and local militias) Karen National Peace Committee (Note: Karen National Army, Democratic Karen Benevolent Army, KNU/KNLA Peace Council, Karen People's Party) Pa-O National Army Zomi Revolutionary Army (Note: India-based); National Unity Government and allies: People's Defence Force and allies (Note: Spring Revolution Alliance, All Burma Students' Democratic Front, Burma National Revolutionary Army, People's Defence Force (Kalay), People's Liberation Army, People's Revolution Alliance (Magway), smaller local groups) Kachin Independence Army and allies (Note: Kagabu People’s Force, Kachin Region People’s Defence Force (Kachin PDF)) Arakan Army Karen National Liberation Army and allies (Note: Karen National Defence Organisation, Arakan Army (Kayin State), local PDF's, smaller resistance groups) Karenni IEC resistance forces (Note: Karenni Nationalities Defence Force, Karenni Army, Karenni National People's Liberation Front, Kayan National Army, local PDF's, smaller resistance groups) Chinland Council allies (Note: Chin National Army, majority of Chinland Defense Forces, and some Zomi allied groups) Chin Brotherhood (Note: Chin National Defence Force, Chin People's Army, Maraland Defence Force, Zoland Defence Force) Pa-O National Liberation Army Danu People's Liberation Army and allies (Note: Danu State National Defence Army, local PDF's, smaller resistance groups) Mon resistance (Note: Ramonnya Mon Army, Mon State Revolutionary Force, Mon State Defense Force); Noncombatant ethnic armed organizations: United Wa State Army Shan State Army (SSPP) Shan State Army (RCSS) National Democratic Alliance Army Mon National Liberation Army; Other combatants: Indian insurgent groups (Note: United National Liberation Front of Western South East Asia (National Socialist Council of Nagaland, United Liberation Front of Asom, Kamtapur Liberation Organisation), Coordination Committee (Kangleipak Communist Party, Kanglei Yawol Kanna Lup, People's Revolutionary Party of Kangleipak, People's Liberation Army of Manipur, United National Liberation Front, United Peoples Party of Kangleipak), smaller groups) Myanmar National Democratic Alliance Army Ta'ang National Liberation Army; For a detailed, accurate, up-to-date map, see here; For a simplified map, see here; For a list of engagements, see here
Date	25 March 2021 – present (5 years, 7 months, 3 weeks and 5 days)
Location	Myanmar (with spillover in neighbouring countries)
Status	Ongoing
Territorial changes	Tatmadaw's stable control drops to between 72–220 out of 330 townships, though continues to control most major population centers; 96 towns captured by anti-Tatmadaw forces, including fifteen district-level or higher towns (as of 1 December 2025); Several regional administrations declared, including the State of Chinland the Karenni State Interim Executive Council, the Arakan People's Revolutionary Government, the Ta'ang People's Government, the People's Government of Kokang and the Sagaing Federal Unit Interim Government

Belligerents
National Unity Government; People's Defence Force; Allied ethnic armed organisations: Northern Alliance; Kachin Independence Army; Three Brotherhood Alliance; Arakan Army; Ta'ang National Liberation Army (until 2026); Myanmar National Democratic Alliance Army (until 2026); 4K Coalition; Karen National Liberation Army; Karenni Army; Karenni National People's Liberation Front (since 2023); Karenni Nationalities Defence Force; Chinland Council; Chin National Army; Chinland Defense Force; Chin Brotherhood; Chin National Defence Force; Chin People's Army; Zoland Defence Force; Spring Revolution Alliance; Pa-O National Liberation Army (since 2024); Smaller ethnic armed organisations; Other organisations: All Burma Students' Democratic Front; People's Liberation Army; Anti-Fascist Internationalist Front; Small independent anti-junta guerrilla groups (Note: Hundreds of anti-junta local defence forces are strewn across the country, which operate unconventionally, carrying out hit-and-run attacks, targeted killings, ambushes, remote bombings and a small number of rocket attacks.)	Tatmadaw and allies; Tatmadaw; Myanmar Army; Border Guard Forces (Note: former New Democratic Army – Kachin, Lahu Democratic Front, elements of DKBA); Myanmar Air Force; Myanmar Navy; Myanmar Coast Guard; Myanmar Police Force; Border Guard Police; Pyusawhti militias; Thway Thout (until 2023); Aligned ethnic armed organisations: Arakan Liberation Army; Pa-O National Army; Karen National Army; Shanni Nationalities Army; New Democratic Army - Kachin (until 2024); Zomi Revolutionary Army (Note: Despite having issued a public statement of support for anti-junta resistance in April 2021, the ZRA has been supplied by and worked alongside the junta to attack resistance); Wuyang People's Militia; Arakan Rohingya Salvation Army; Rohingya Solidarity Organisation; Smaller pro-junta ethnic armed organisations; Other combatants: Myanmar National Democratic Alliance Army (since 2026); Ta'ang National Liberation Army (since 2026)

Commanders and leaders
Duwa Lashi La; Mahn Winn Khaing Thann; Yee Mon; Than Khae; Po Than Gyaung; Bo Nagar (surrendered); N'Ban La; Htang Gam Shawng; Sumlut Gun Maw; Saw Johnny; Saw Baw Kyaw Heh; Tun Kyaw; Pu Zing Cung; Maung Saungkha; Khun Bedu; Khun Thurein; Nai Banyar Lel; Twan Mrat Naing; Nyo Twan Awng; Khaing Thu Kha; Tar Aik Bong; Tar Bone Kyaw; Peng Daxun	(Myanmar) Min Aung Hlaing; (Myanmar) Ye Win Oo; (Myanmar) Soe Win; (Myanmar) Mya Tun Oo; (Myanmar) Tin Aung San; (Myanmar) Maung Maung Aye; (Myanmar) Htun Aung; (Myanmar) Yar Pyae; (Myanmar) Than Hlaing; (Myanmar) Zin Min Htet; (Myanmar) Ni Lin Aung; (Myanmar) Aung Lin Dwe; Aung Kham Hti; Khun Myint Aung; Sao Meim Liam; Sao Khun Aung; Thanglianpau Guite; U Shwe Min †; Saw Chit Thu; Zahkung Ting Ying; Ataullah abu Ammar Jununi (POW); Ustad Khalid; Mohammed Ayyub Khan; Ko Ko Linn; Tar Aik Bong; Tar Bone Kyaw; Peng Daxun

Strength
100,000 (PDF, February 2024 estimate) and more than 100,000 (LDF and allied ethnic armed organisations, EAOs)	Volunteers: estimates vary, from 70,000 to 201,000; Draftees: ~120,000 ( estimate of the 24th batches )

Casualties and losses
- 89,200 – 96,000+ total killed (per ACLED, 1 Jan 2026); 6,087 civilians killed & 28,051 arrested (per AAPP, 31 Dec 2024); 3,484,300 internally displaced & 176,000-182,000 refugees (per United Nations, 20 Dec 2024); 83,746 civilian properties estimated burnt or destroyed since February 2022 (per Data for Myanmar, 14 April 2024); 440 houses and buildings sealed off by the SAC (per AAPP, February 2022); At least 10 killed & multiple injured as part of spillover (Note: 7 killed in Bangladesh: 3 killed in Thailand:)

The Myanmar civil war (Note: Burmese: မြန်မာ့ပြည်တွင်းစစ် or Burmese: ၂၀၂၁-လက်ရှိ မြန်မာပြည်သူ့ခုခံတွန်းလှန်စစ်, MLCTS: 2021 – lakhri. mranmanuing.ngan pranysu.hku.hkamtwan:hlancac, Burmese pronunciation: [n̥ə.'tʰa̼ʊn.n̥ə.sʰɛʔ – 'lɐʔ.ʃi̼ mjàm.mà.nàɪŋ.ŋàɴ 'pjì.θu̼ 'kʰu̼.kʰàɰ̃ 'tʊ́ːɰ̃.ɫàɰ̃.sɪʔ]) began following the military coup on 1 February 2021. The seizure of power triggered mass anti-coup demonstrations and a violent crackdown by the Tatmadaw (Myanmar armed forces), which significantly escalated the country's longstanding insurgencies.

In response to the coup, the exiled National Unity Government (NUG) and major ethnic armed organisations repudiated the 2008 Constitution and called instead for a democratic federal state. Besides engaging this alliance, the ruling military junta the State Administration Council (SAC), led by Min Aung Hlaing, contended with other anti-regime forces in areas under its control. The insurgents are apportioned into hundreds of armed groups scattered across the country.

As of March 2023 the United Nations estimated that since the coup, 17.6 million people in Myanmar required humanitarian assistance, 1.6 million were internally displaced, and over 55,000 civilian buildings had been destroyed. In May 2026, the United Nations High Commissioner for Refugees (UNHCR) reported that around 299,000 people had fled to neighboring countries such as Bangladesh, India, and Thailand.

By 2022, the opposition controlled substantial, though sparsely populated, territory. By October 2023, the Tatmadaw controlled under 40% of the country, though it maintained that it controlled around two-thirds of the country's 330 townships. In the second half of 2023, Chinland Defense Forces in Chin State had captured a majority of the state, with a few holdouts in urban areas and along the India–Myanmar border remaining. In October 2023, the Tatmadaw began facing manpower issues, with desertions and low morale being extremely common. This coincided with a major offensive by the People's Defense Force (PDF) and Three Brotherhood Alliance in the west of the country, which took 80 bases, 220 SAC positions, and several towns by 28 November 2023.

October 2023 saw the beginning of a series of concurrent anti-SAC offensives. In Operation 1027, anti-SAC forces seized Laukkai, the capital of Kokang Self-Administered Zone. Operation 1111 besieged the state capital of Loikaw. Arakan Army (AA) seized Mrauk U, among other towns, in an offensive in northern Rakhine state. By February 2024, thousands of the SAC's soldiers had surrendered without a fight, including six Tatmadaw generals. The Sit-tat uses terror tactics against the population, including burnings, beheadings, mutilations, war rape, torching villages, and a massive aerial bombing campaign that has displaced nearly three million people. The Myanmar Air Force has dropped more bombs per capita than have been dropped in the Russo-Ukrainian war. A group of observers wrote that the Sit-tat's forces remain formidable, with external allies and economic resources.

In March 2024, anti-SAC forces in southeastern Myanmar captured Demoso and Papun, bringing the number of district-level towns captured by anti-SAC forces to eight. In June, Matupi was captured by Chin resistance. The Three Brotherhood Alliance then restarted Operation 1027, capturing Kyaukme in June and two more district-level towns in July. On 3 August, the MNDAA captured Lashio, the largest town in northern Shan State and headquarters of the Tatmadaw's Northeastern Command. On 20 December 2024, the Arakan Army captured the Tatmadaw's Western Command headquarters in Ann, Rakhine State.

After the deadly 2025 Myanmar earthquake, the NUG declared a two-week pause on offensives, and the SAC announced a ceasefire from 2 April to 22 April, despite continuing airstrikes on rebel groups. On 31 July, the SAC announced its dissolution and transferred power to the National Defence and Security Council under the chairmanship of Min Aung Hlaing. Continued junta counteroffensives saw success in northern Shan state, retaking the district capital of Kyaukme on 2 October 2025. The TNLA withdrew from Mogok and Mongmit due to supply issues and the MNDAA fully withdrew from Lashio under Chinese pressure. Fighting has continued variously in all regions and states of Myanmar, including Naypyidaw Union Territory.

== Background ==
=== Internal conflict in Myanmar ===
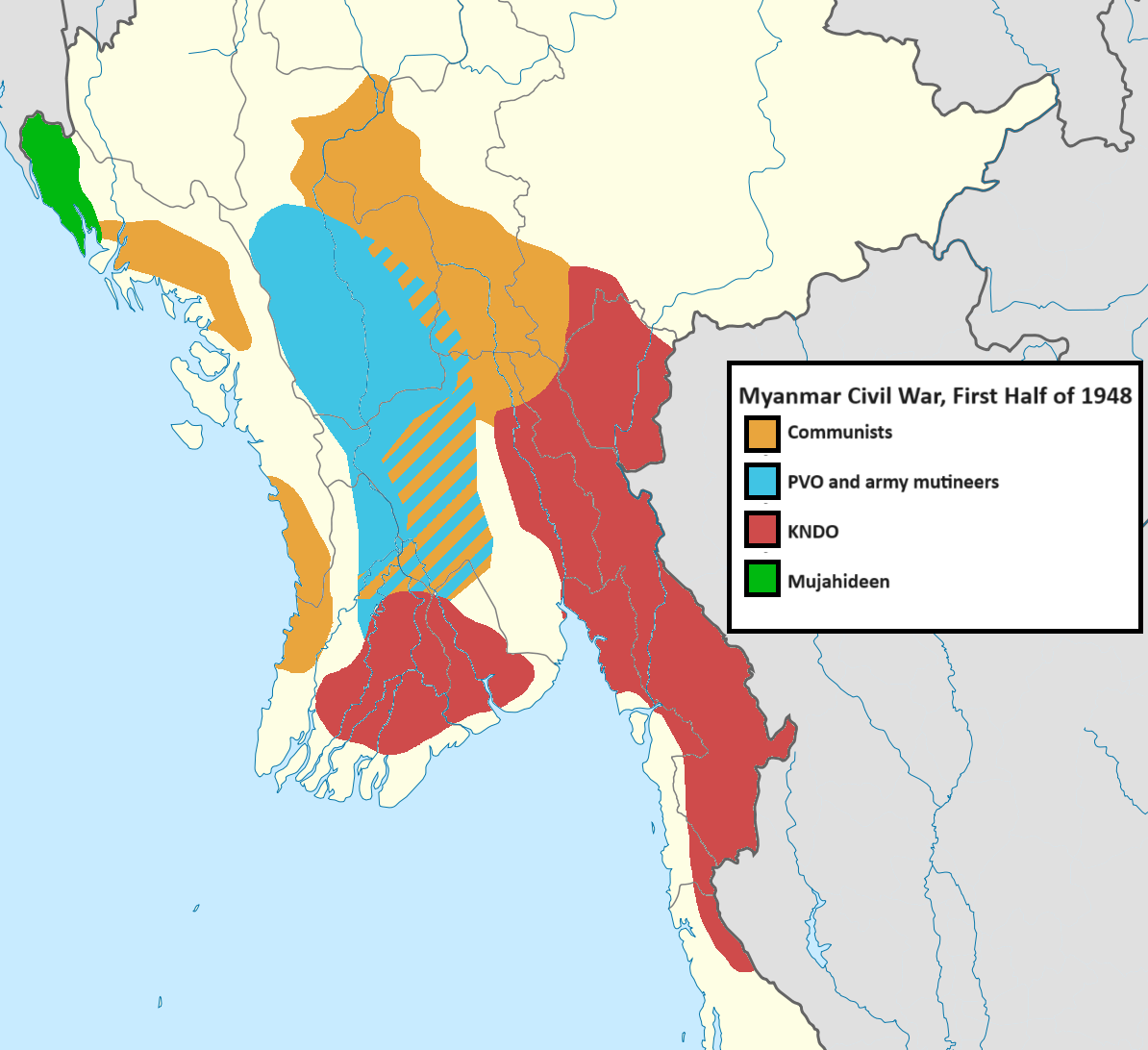
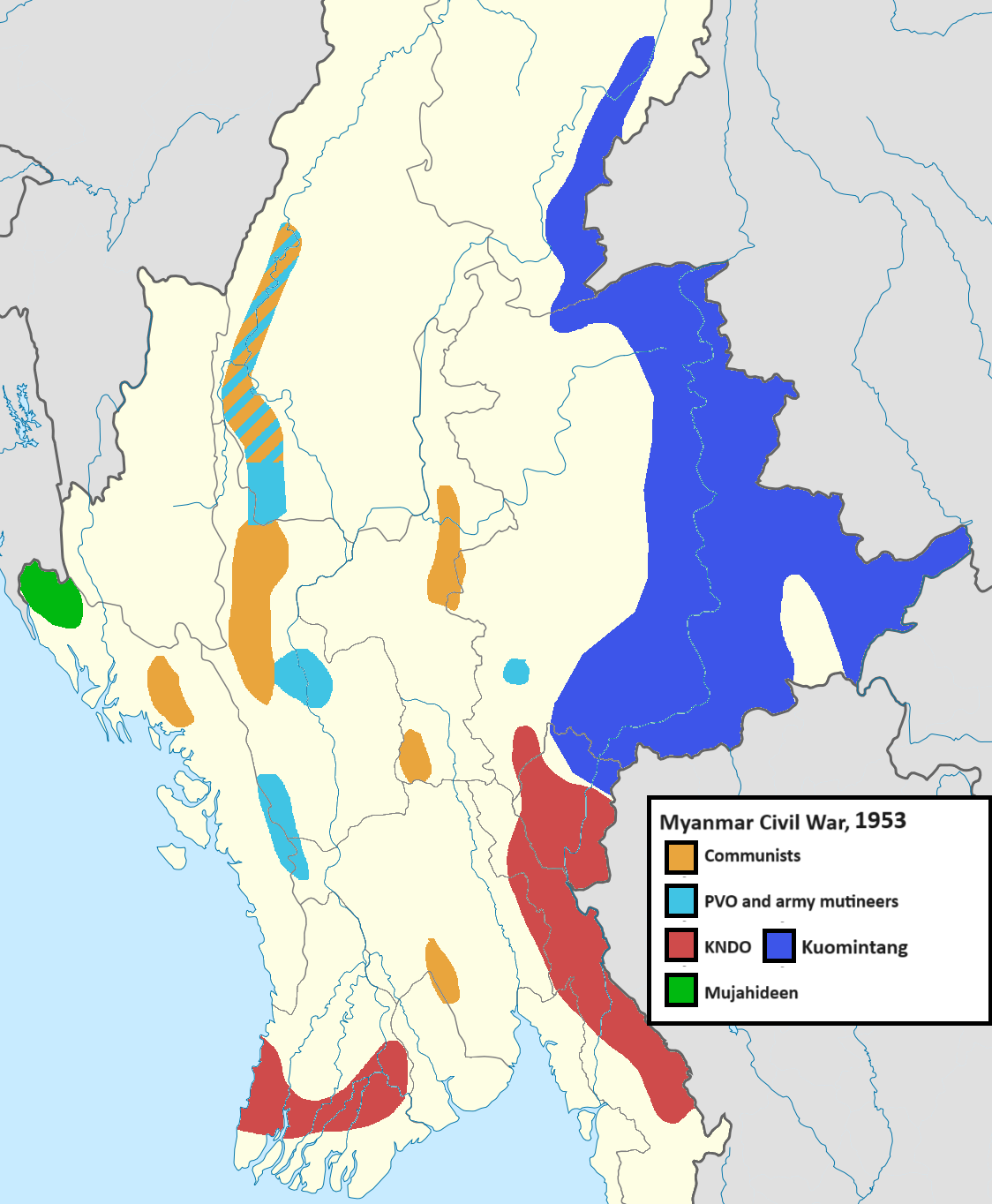
Map of insurgent activity in Burma in 1948 (top) and 1953 (bottom)

Insurgencies have been ongoing in Myanmar since 1948, largely along ethnic lines. Communists and the Karen National Union opposed the central government. During the 20th century, several prominent ethnic armed organizations (EAOs) rose and fell in influence and control. Larger rebel factions such as the Kachin Independence Army (KIA) formed in response to the 1962 coup d'état. The 8888 Uprising also drove protestors to ethnic rebel territory, forming Bamar militias.

The Tatmadaw took control of the government directly and severely weakened ethnic insurgent groups, destroying most of their bases and strongholds through the 1990s, including Kokang and Karen State.

As part of reforms, the 2008 Constitution created self-administered zones with increased autonomy, without embracing a federal system. The 2015 Nationwide Ceasefire Agreement (NCA) was signed between eight EAOs and the central government, but began to fall apart by 2018, due to alleged violations by Tatmadaw soldiers. Many non-signatories continued the conflict. In late 2016, four non-signatories of the NCA, including the KIA and Arakan Army, formed the Northern Alliance and resumed war.

=== 2021 coup d'état and protests ===
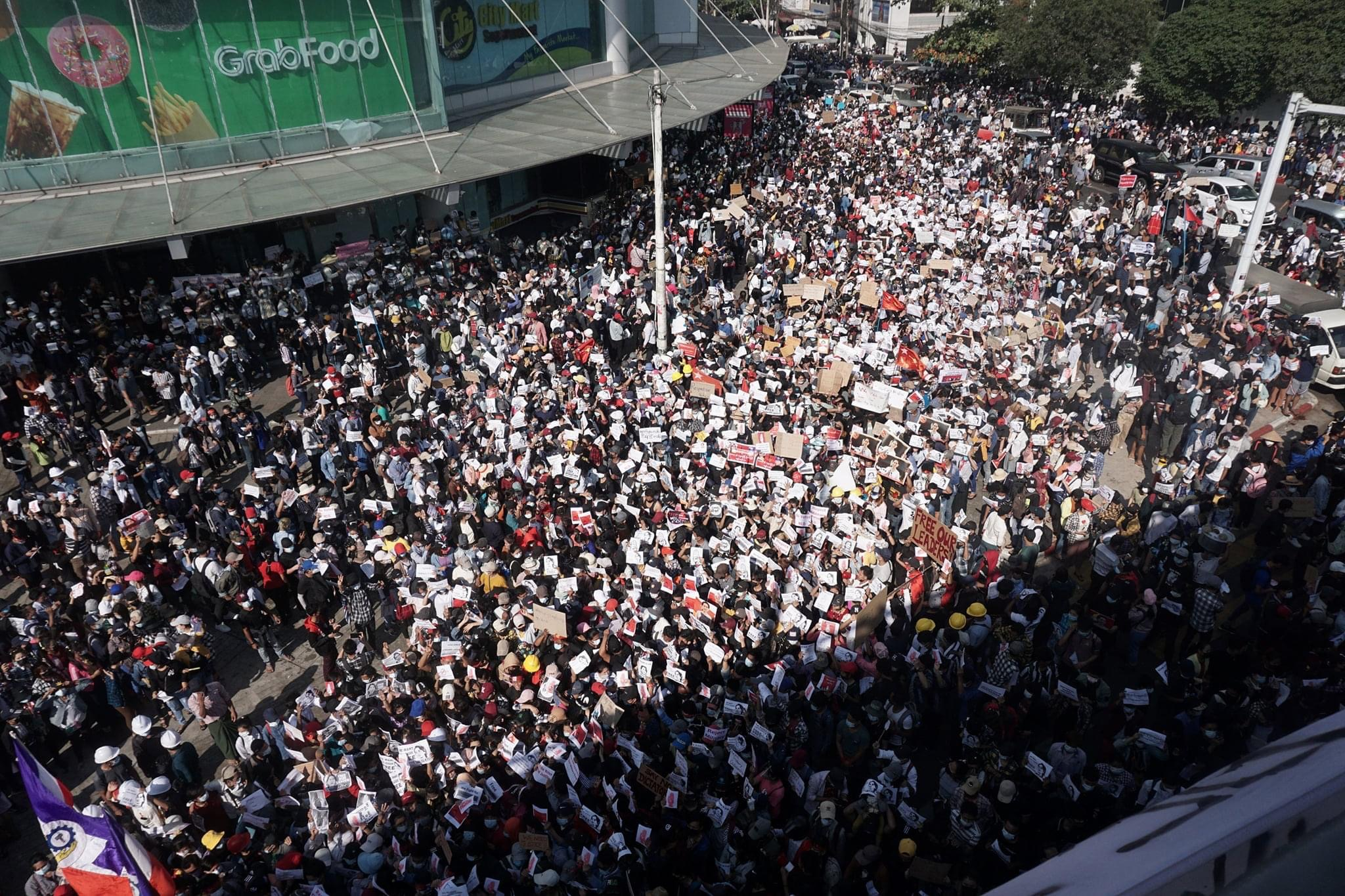
Thousands of protesters participating in an anti-junta rally in Yangon, February 2021

On 1 February 2021, the Tatmadaw overthrew the elected government in a coup d'état, forming a State Administration Council (SAC) and detaining National League for Democracy (NLD) leadership. Min Aung Hlaing was installed as the de facto ruler of the country.

The Tatmadaw claimed that the 2020 general elections had 8.6 million voter irregularities, but presented no evidence. The coup has been a way to reestablish the military's absolute dominance, after a decade of civilian rule.

== Prelude ==
The bloody repression of anti-coup demonstrations led to the creation of armed groups to fight the SAC. These groups then aligned with the National Unity Government (NUG), formed by ousted parliamentarians, under the name of the People's Defence Force (PDF). The PDF and the NUG declared a "defensive war" against SAC rule in September 2021.

=== Armed protesters ===
By late March 2021, dozens of protesters per day had been travelling to Myanmar's border areas to enlist in and train under one of the country's many insurgent groups, elevating the risk of a countrywide civil war. The Committee Representing Pyidaungsu Hluttaw (CRPH) also proposed the formation of a "Federal Armed Force" to combat the military, and in late March the Arakan Army (AA) threatened to end its ceasefire with the military should the latter "persist in massacring civilians".

In late March, protesters increasingly began arming themselves with homemade weapons in an attempt to defend themselves against attacks by the military. Clashes with soldiers and IED attacks against administrative buildings and police stations became more common and protesters slowly became armed resistance.

After about 30 years of dormancy, the People's Liberation Army (PLA), the armed wing of the Communist Party of Burma (CPB), became active again on 15 March 2021 when communist fighters crossed from China into Kachin State, where the Kachin Independence Army gave them weapons. By August 2021, the CPB had established a new armed wing to fight the SAC. Over the next two years, the PLA presence grew in Tanintharyi Region, where they fought alongside the PDF, claiming to have 1,000 active troops in December 2023.

=== Renewed ethnic conflict ===
The unrest across the nation and increased need for SAC troops in previously peaceful urban areas strengthened EAOs. The Kachin Independence Army had already been on the offensive since February and seized the military's base of Alaw Bum near the town of Laiza on 25 March 2021. The next day, the Karen National Liberation Army (KNLA) attacked a military base, killing 10 SAC soldiers and taking others hostage in their first attack since the protests began. The next day saw the 2021 Kalay clashes, where protesters first openly used homemade weapons against soldiers, targeting security forces attacking a protest camp.

SAC declared that it would cease all military operations on 29 March 2021 and hold bilateral negotiations with ethnic armed groups. But the Kachin Independence Army continued its offensives, saying the Myanmar Army had not in fact ceased operations. Seven insurgent groups who were signatories to the Nationwide Ceasefire Agreement aligned themselves with the National Unity Government (NUG), including the All Burma Student Democratic Front (ABSDF) and the Karen National Union (KNU). The Northern Alliance, comprising the Arakan Army, the Ta'ang National Liberation Army, and the Myanmar National Democratic Alliance Army, attacked a police station in Naungmon, Shan State, killing at least 10 police officers and indicating their disregard of the SAC's call for a ceasefire. In response, on 11 April 2021, the military junta launched a counterattack to recapture the Alaw Bum base using airstrikes and ground troops, but had to retreat amidst heavy casualties.

On 26 April 2021, the Battle of Mindat became one of the first large-scale conflicts arising from the 2021 coup. The Chinland Defense Force (CDF) began armed resistance in Mindat, Chin State and the SAC declared martial law. After a soldier allegedly fired at protesters, fighting between the two sides erupted. The battle lasted four days, killing 30 SAC soldiers and leaving Mindat abandoned as more than 10,000 people fled the area.

== Timeline ==
=== Onset of formal resistance and war (May 2021 – August 2021) ===
On 16 April 2021, pro-democracy politician Min Ko Naing announced the formation of the National Unity Government, with members of ethnic minority groups in senior roles. As part of the announcement he said that ousted leaders Aung San Suu Kyi and Win Myint would retain their positions and asked the international community to recognize their government over the SAC. Throughout April, informal clashes with protesters intensified, such as in Taze when protesters fought back against soldiers with hunting rifles and firebombs on 8 April.

The National Unity Government declared the formation of an armed wing, the People's Defence Force (PDF), on 5 May 2021, a date often cited as the start of the civil war. The PDF was formed to protect its supporters from SAC attacks and as a first step towards a Federal Union Army. The PDF clashed with the Tatmadaw in the town of Muse on 23 May, killing at least 13 members of Myanmar's security forces.

In early June, fighting erupted in Myawaddy District where the military and Karen Border Guard Forces battled against a combined Karen and PDF force, leaving dozens of SAC troops killed. Members of the Karenni PDF in Kayah State also captured and destroyed several Tatmadaw outposts near the state capital, Loikaw. Towards the end of May, the Tatmadaw used artillery and helicopters to strike PDF positions in Loikaw and Demoso. On 30 May, the KIA joined the PDF in a battle against SAC troops in Katha Township, killing eight SAC soldiers. Fighting also sprouted up in other Kachin State townships, including Putao, Hpakant and Momauk.

While there were fewer conflict deaths between May and September, there were still many armed clashes and a spike in early June. Two dozen local officials appointed by the military were assassinated throughout the month of June with hundreds of bombings at police stations, banks and government offices. On 22 June, SAC forces using armoured vehicles raided a safehouse of the PDF in Mandalay, detaining several fighters. Myanmar security forces killed at least 25 people in another raid in Tabayin. These attacks occurred in Central Myanmar, also known as Anya, an area that had rarely seen armed violence in recent times. On 2 July, troops assaulted several villages in Sagaing Region and reportedly killed 41 civilians. The Washington Post described how Myanmar was sliding toward "bloody anarchy".

==== Declaration of war ====
On 7 September 2021, the NUG declared a state of emergency across the nation and launched what they called the "people's defensive war" against the SAC. The declaration of war increased the number of skirmishes and clashes between PDF militias, EAOs and the SAC across the country. According to the NUG in September 2021, over 1,700 SAC soldiers had been killed and 630 wounded in fighting during the preceding three months. Several major clashes took place from September to October in Chin State, Sagaing Region, Magwe Region, Kayah State and Shan State.

On 18 September, the Pa-O National Army, a pro-SAC militia active in the Pa-O Self-Administered Zone, aided the SAC in capturing a resistance base near Aungban.

By late September 2021, 8,000 residents of Thantlang town, Chin state, fled to Mizoram, India after their houses were set ablaze by the SAC army. Ambushes by anti-SAC forces in Shan State also killed at least 20 soldiers. On 16 November 2021, SAC forces overran and captured the base camp of Kalay PDF in southwestern Sagaing Region, killing 2 fighters and capturing 9 Kalay PDF medics.

In October, SAC-controlled media reported that at least 406 junta informants had been killed and 285 wounded since 1 February in targeted attacks by resistance forces.

=== Initial conflict (September 2021 – August 2022) ===
==== 2021–2022 dry season campaigns ====
According to analyst Matthew Arnold, the civil war's momentum had passed a critical threshold by the end of the 2022 dry season, when revolutionary sentiment had grown into a broader social and armed resistance that the SAC could no longer suppress. Towards the end of 2021, direct armed clashes gave way to more bombings, explosive devices and landmines. The PDF, with strong ground support from local communities, attacked soft government targets like police stations, outposts and military-owned businesses. Through these, the resistance became more organised as they seized weapons, underwent training and communicated between units through the help of the NUG and allied EAOs. According to the Karen National Union, roughly 2,200 SAC soldiers and militiamen were killed in the first half of 2022.

===== South-eastern Myanmar =====
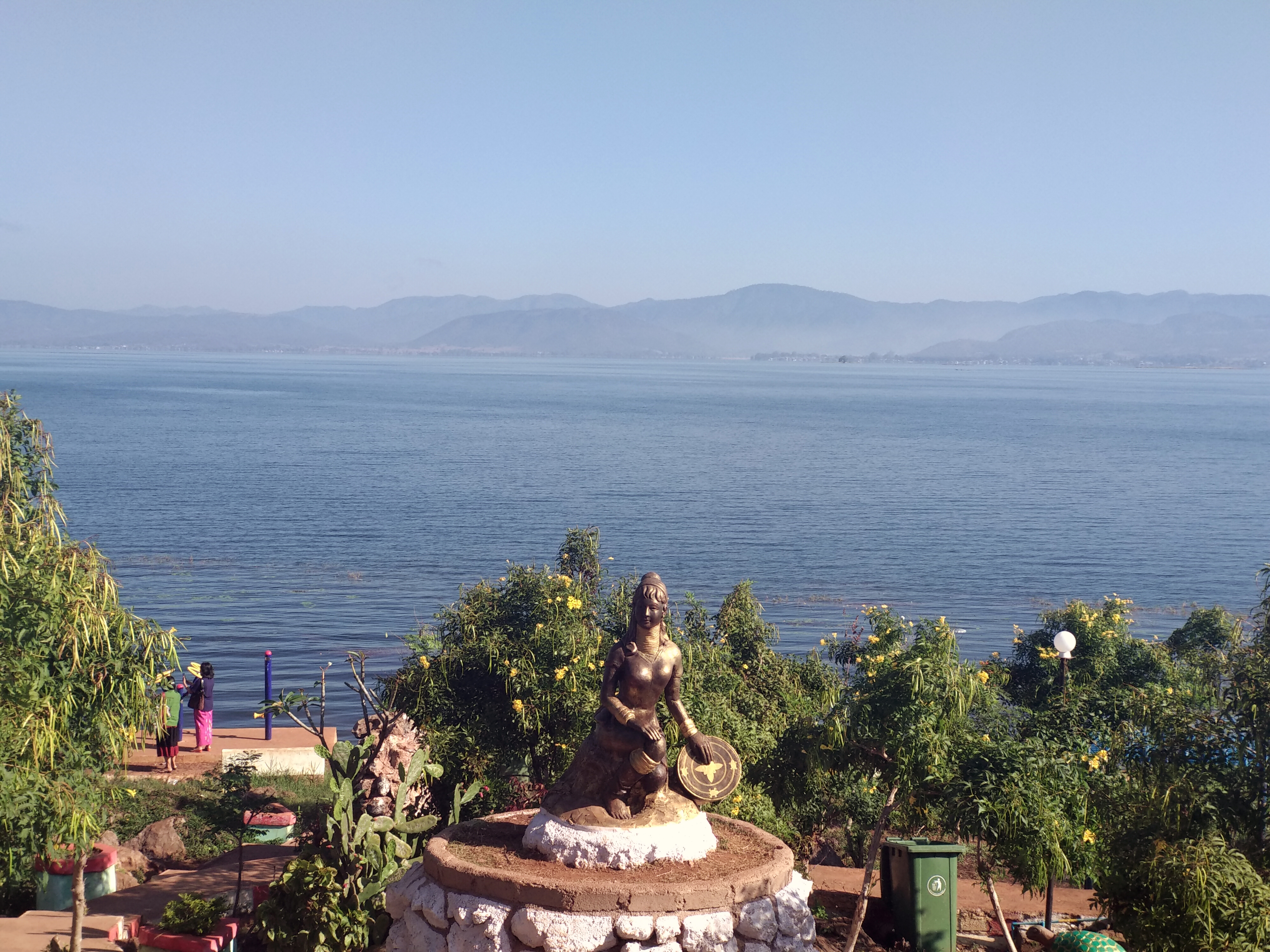
Moe Bye Reservoir

On 17 November 2021, dozens of SAC soldiers ambushed an outpost of the Moebye PDF in Pekon Township, Shan State, forcing the outnumbered PDF soldiers to retreat. At least four SAC soldiers were killed during a four-day clash in Hpruso Township with the KNDF and Karenni Army.

On 14 December, around 200 Tatmadaw troops searched the Karen National Union (KNU)-controlled town of Lay Kay Kaw Myothit near the Thai border, arresting people suspected to be activists or members of the PDF. On 20 December, SAC forces burned down nineteen houses in Kunnar, Loikaw Township after taking it from the KNDF the week before.

On 24 December, more than 35 people were massacred when they were ambushed by SAC troops outside the village of Mo So in Kayah State. Two staff members of the aid group Save the Children were among those killed. The United Nations Security Council condemned the attack and called for a "thorough and transparent investigation" into the incident.

Throughout February and March 2022, the SAC carried out repeated air strikes against civilian targets in villages in Shan, Kayin and Kayah States. On 17 February alone, around 20 SAC soldiers and 20 resistance fighters were killed in clashes in Mobye, southern Shan State. Witnesses described soldiers systematically looting jewelry, cash, vehicles, and other valuables. Amnesty International reported these actions as collective punishment against the country's ethnic minorities.

Fighting broke out in parts of Loikaw on 14 April. The number of refugees on the Thai border increased after increased combat in Kayin State. On 15 April, SAC soldiers suffered at least 30 casualties after being pushed back by the KNLA at the battle for Lay Kay Kaw.

===== Central Myanmar =====
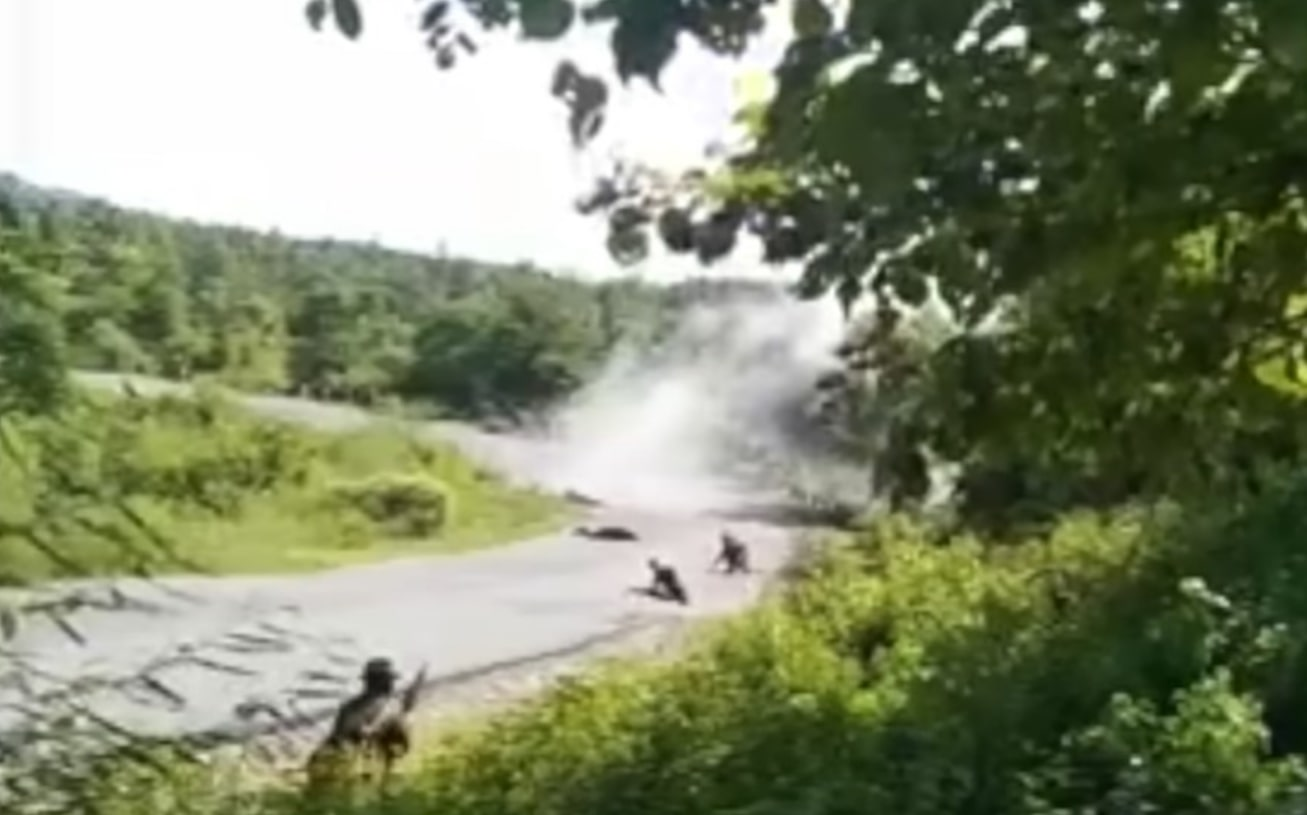
People's Defence Force fighting in Sagaing Region, 2022

The Dry Zone, the historical heartland of Myanmar, had rarely seen armed violence in the modern conflict in Myanmar since 1948 as a predominantly Buddhist and Bamar farming region. The fighting in the Anya theater of Central Myanmar starting in 2021 changed this trajectory. Without the presence of EAOs, the Bamar PDF groups are characterized as local cells acting autonomously towards simple goals and directed towards the 2021 coup. In the 2021–2022 dry season, the PDFs began to work more closely together and coordinate towards larger goals. In early 2022, resistance forces were fighting in Monywa, the capital of Sagaing Region. Resistance attacks on the SAC saw the SAC retaliate on civilians Targeted personnel attacks increased, killing various SAC personnel and destroying equipment. The PDF also suffered losses, with 12 fighters killed in a battle in Khin-U Township. Many cities saw violent clashes during 2022's Union Day. Mandalay also saw fighting, with casualties on both sides.

===== Northern Myanmar =====
Throughout the 2021–2022 dry season, various groups in Northern Myanmar carried out ambushes against military outposts and convoys. The Kachin Independence Army (KIA) and the PDF attacked convoys in Mohnyin and Hpakant townships. In October, they also partially shut down gold mining operations run by SAC allies. After an ambush near Shwegu, the Tatmadaw responded with airstrikes and ground attacks against KIA bases in Hpakant and Mohnyin Townships. In early February, the KIA assaulted several military bases in Kachin and Shan States, reportedly burning one in Hpakant Township down. The SAC responded by increasing airstrikes and sending reinforcements to the area.

The Chinland Defense Force (CDF) and the Chin National Army (CNA) raided and ambushed outposts and convoys in Matupi and Mindat Townships. In December, the Tatmadaw recaptured the town of Thantlang from the CDF in an offensive that destroyed over a quarter of the town's buildings.

On 14 January 2022, units of the CNA moved into Senam village, south of Tamu, in neighboring Sagaing Region to attack a base run by the Indian-based People's Liberation Army of Manipur. After several hours of fighting, between 10 and 20 Manipuri rebels and 1 CNA fighter were killed.

===== Yangon and other regions =====
During this time, there were several cases of guerilla warfare across Myanmar using homemade explosives, including several accidents killing resistance fighters. On 17 June 2021, an army vehicle exploded in Tamwe Township, Yangon, allegedly killing several military personnel. On 14 December, Tatmadaw troops captured 12 suspected resistance fighters after several bombs accidentally exploded in Hlaing Thar Yar Township, Yangon. Urban warfare became less practical, so resistance forces began targeting SAC-aligned officials. According to SAC-aligned sources, 367 SAC-appointed officials were assassinated in targeted attacks between February 2021 and February 2022. Resistance forces also began targeting the homes of SAC pilots in Yangon in response to airstrikes on civilians.

Fighting also occurred in other Bamar-majority regions. On 31 January 2022, at least 36 SAC soldiers were reportedly killed in ambushes over three days in Magwe, Sagaing and Tanintharyi regions and Chin, Shan and Kayah states.

==== 2022 monsoon decrease in intensity ====
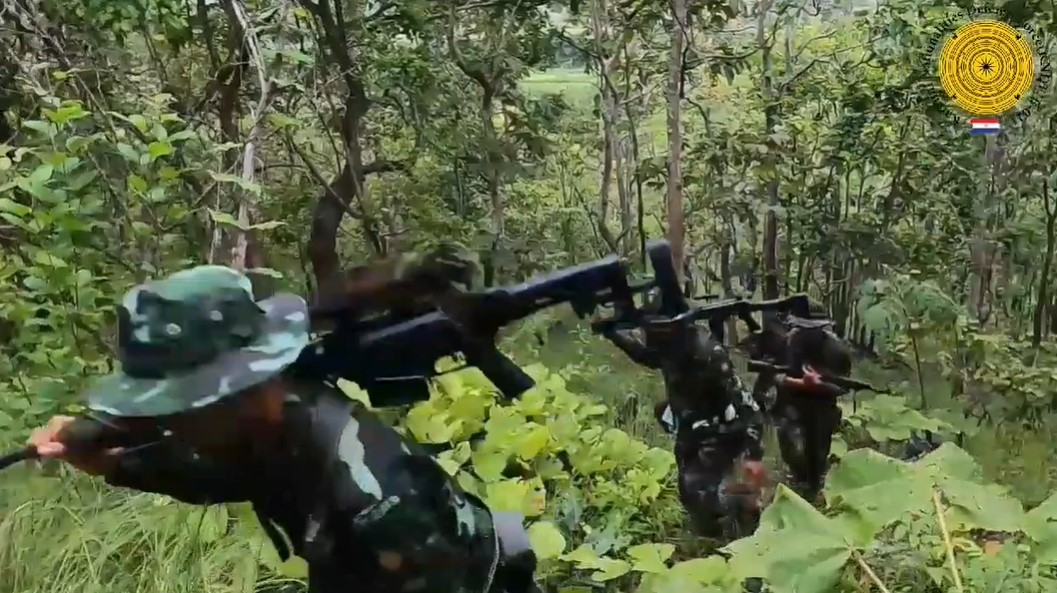
Karenni Nationalities Defence Force soldiers, September 2022

The intensity of fighting decreased during the monsoon season. Resistance forces were advantaged by the rainfall as the SAC could not carry out air strikes as easily. In June, resistance groups achieved control of 40–50% of the country. Arakan Army claimed to administer most of Rakhine State with an independent government. Chin National Front and CDF made plans to establish a new government. The KIA and the Wa State, a neutral de facto independent region of Myanmar, consolidated expanded territories. However, the Myanmar Army retained tight control of almost every city in Myanmar and most of the country's natural resources, including important jade mines. During this time, the PDF were also unable to move beyond rural guerilla tactics. Duwa Lashi La, acting president of the NUG, cited the lack of weaponry and international support as reasons for the prolonged conflict.

On 31 May 2022, a bombing killed one person and injured nine others near the Sule Pagoda in Yangon, the largest city in Myanmar. State media accused the People's Defence Force of being responsible for the attack, which the PDF denied. A July clash in Pekon Township, Shan State also killed around 40 SAC soldiers and 11 PDF fighters.

===== Massacres and executions =====
The military deployed its time-tested counterinsurgency methods in what has been called a "hammer approach" of bombing and burning villages and massacring civilians to flush out rebel groups. However, the approach was ineffective because they were unable to consolidate power or deter resistance.

Myanmar military forces executed at least 37 villagers in the Mon Taing Pin massacre in May 2022 after shelling the village of Mondaingbin, Sagaing Region with heavy artillery. The SAC forces entered the local Buddhist monastery, conscripted young male villagers briefly before executing them and other captives by a stupa. Following a raid in Se Zin village, Kachin state, SAC soldiers set fire to more than 400 homes, detaining some 400 people in August 2022. Radio Free Asia reported 100 of the prisoners were killed either through an extrajudicial massacre) by security forces or due to horrific prison conditions.

On 23 July 2022, the State Administration Council announced that it had executed four political prisoners, including Zayar Thaw and Kyaw Min Yu, which was the first use of capital punishment in Myanmar since the late 1980s. The men had been accused of helping the resistance movement. The event was widely seen as a provocation to escalate the ongoing conflict by the Tatmadaw. The international community, including United Nations Secretary-General, the G7 nations and the European Union strongly condemned the executions.

On 16 September 2022, the Burmese military killed 11 children and wounded another 17 in the Let Yet Kone massacre, as part of an airborne strike conducted against a school Sagaing Region. The military claimed that the village was harbouring resistance fighters from the KIA and PDF. The attack was widely condemned by the international community, including the United Nations and European Union.

Later in September 2022, retired Brigadier General Ohn Thwin, mentor to State Administration Council vice-chairman Senior General Soe Win, was assassinated by anti-SAC guerrilla groups in Yangon. This assassination caused an increase in security on high-ranking SAC personnel.

==== Breakdown of Arakan ceasefire, monsoon 2022 ====
In early 2022, the Arakan Army and the junta clashed again in northern Rakhine State. On 8 February, Arakan Army and junta forces clashed on at least two occasions in Maungdaw in Rakhine State. Fighting broke out on 4 February when junta troops carried out a sneak attack on an AA outpost near the Letpan Mountains northeast of Mee Taik Village, killing an AA sentry, according to AA spokesman Khaing Thukha. Three hours of clashes were also reported on 6 February. The clashes raised fears of a breakdown of the informal ceasefire between the AA and the military which had been in place since November 2020. Further clashes in northern Maungdaw on the night of 7 February killed two civilians. Several junta troops, including a major, were also killed in the attack.

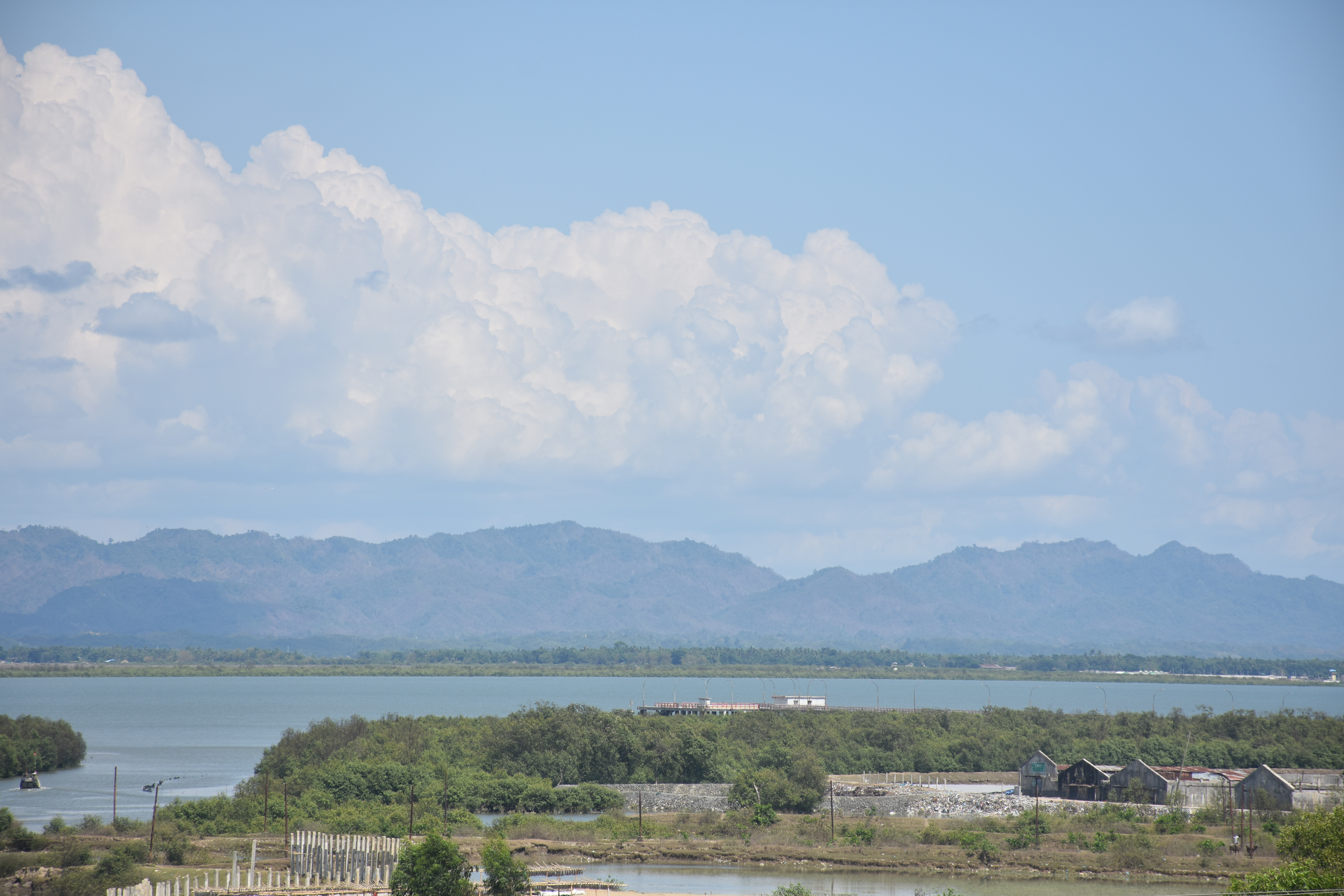
The Bangladesh-Myanmar border

Between June and August 2022, the informal ceasefire reached in late 2020 between the Arakan Army (AA) and the junta broke down. The AA had consolidated control during this period, avoided the initial violence of the war, and introduced many public services and local administrators in northern Rakhine state. With the military's attention diverted to increasing resistance elsewhere and increasing popular support for an alliance with the NUG, the AA sought to expand its influence into southern Rakhine. Rhetoric from AA leader Twan Mrat Naing in June grew more provocative with military spokespeople stating that the AA was inviting conflict. Armed clashes resumed in July after the junta launched an airstrike against an AA base in Kayin State, killing 6 AA soldiers. AA retaliated in Maungdaw Township and western Chin State in late July and early August. By late August, land travel to northern Rakhine required passing a series of checkpoints and all public transport ships had ceased operation due to river and land blockades.

On 16 August 2022, two mortar shells fired by the Myanmar Army landed in a Rohingya refugee camp in Bangladesh, killing one man and injuring five others. Myanmar Army helicopters allegedly entered Bangladeshi air space to attack the Arakan Army and fired a shell within Bangladeshi air space. Two days later, Bangladesh summoned Myanmar ambassador Aung Kyaw Moe to strongly protest the land and airspace violations. In October 2022, Bangladeshi Foreign Minister AK Abdul Momen made a statement that border bombings by Myanmar had stopped after he met with the Chinese ambassador to Bangladesh, Li Jiming.

=== Escalation of the civil war (September 2022 – November 2022) ===
==== Increased resistance efforts ====
In mid-October 2022, NUG issued a statement calling for the victory of the Spring Revolution by the end of 2023. This call to action was followed by increased fighting by the resistance forces in urban areas and in Southeastern Myanmar. This development took place in the wake of the junta torching at least 20 villages in the Sagaing and Magway Regions as part of a "four cuts" strategy of attacking civilians to weaken anti-regime movements. According to Sagaing-based resistance spokespeople, many victims of arson then joined the resistance. The urgency of the resistance was likely prompted by the looming elections planned by the State Administration Council. The fragmented nature of the grassroots elements of the PDF became more organized in 2022 through the command of the NUG and from cooperation with various EAOs- especially the Kachin Independence Army (KIA).

The Karenni Nationalities Defense Force (KNDF) claimed in January 2023 that 1,692 regime troops and 211 resistance fighters were killed since the 2021 coup, 293 civilians had been killed by the regime, and 126 displaced civilians died while fleeing their homes in Kayah and Shan states in 2022.

===== Highland attacks =====
The Karen National Liberation Army stepped up fighting, besieging the major town of Kawkareik on the Thai border in 21 October 2022 Battle of Kawkareik. The battle began with surprise attacks on the Asia Highway and at government offices within the town. Resistance forces looked poised to take the town, but ultimately withdrew two days later after facing junta air strikes and strategically drawing junta troops away from nearby positions. Four days later, undeterred KNLA-led forces seized a junta Light Infantry Battalion base in Kyain Seikgyi Township.

In Shan State, clashes between PDF forces near Inle Lake and the Pa-O National Organisation (PNO) broke out after the PNO coerced villages for speedboats and militia recruits.

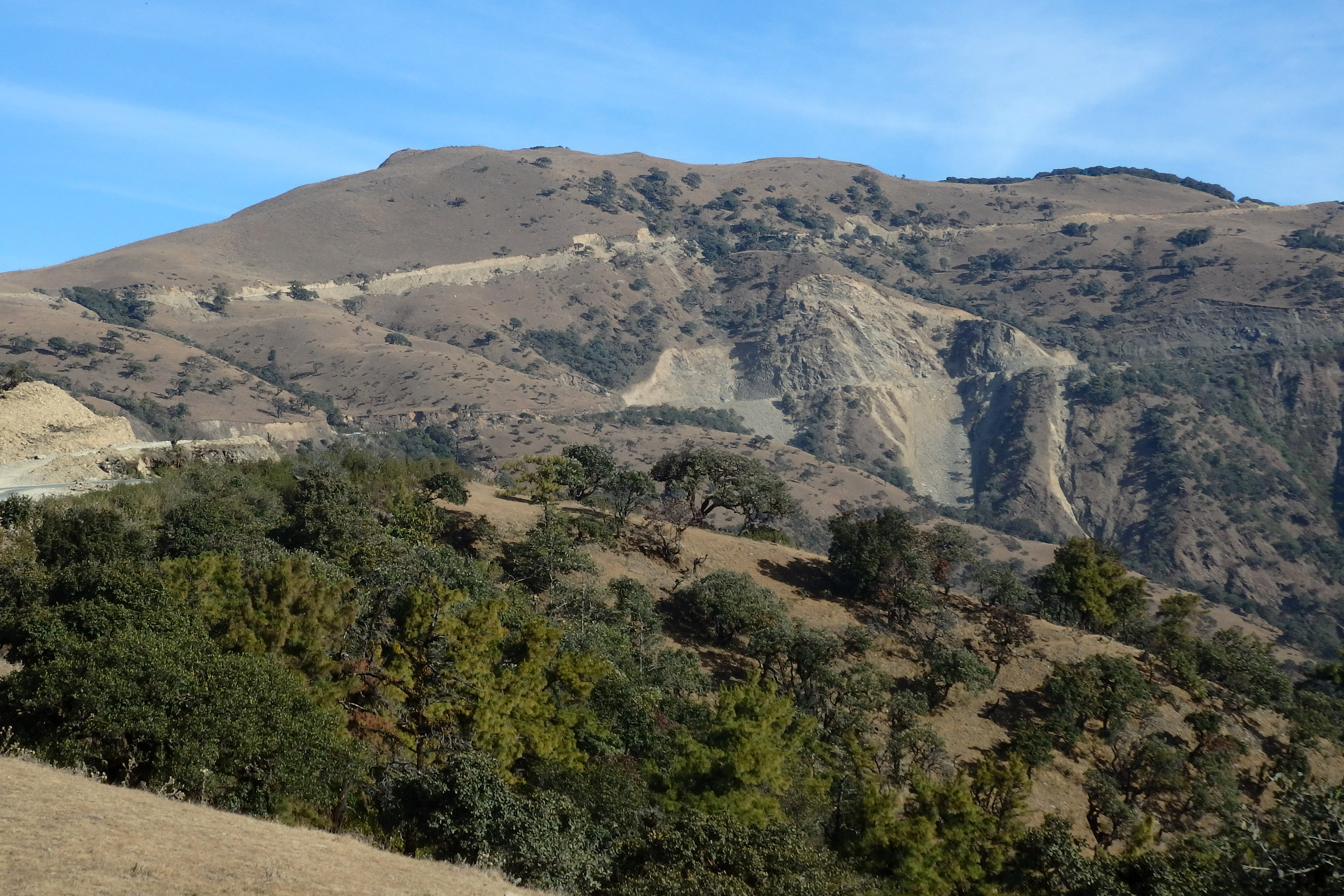
View of the Kalay-Falam Road

In late 2022, Chin State resistance forces used drones in a week-long siege of an outpost in Falam Township, killing 74% of the junta forces stationed, but failing to take the outpost against aerial bombardments. In February 2023, CNA captured Thantlang police station and took control of the town. In Kachin State, the Shanni Nationalities Army (SNA) became more actively allied with the junta as conflict between SNA and the KIA grew. In August, the SNA and the Myanmar Army set fire to hundreds of homes in Kachin state forcing KIA to withdraw from the area.

Chin forces also targeted convoys on roads within the state. In March 2023, combined Chin resistance consisting of CNA, CNDF, and CDFs conducted multiple ambushes on a regime convoy between Kalay, Falam and Hakha capturing and destroyed multiple armoured vehicles. The NUG awarded the combined Chin forces 400 million kyat for seizing two armoured vehicles. The following day, the groups attacked another junta convoy carrying 80 troops on the road between Matupi and Paletwa, killing over 30 junta soldiers. In April, CNDF attacked a junta base on the Kalay-Falam road near Varr, Falam Township, killing eleven regime soldiers and capturing fourteen.

===== Lowland attacks =====
In November 2022, resistance in Bago Region increased. In Monyo Township, western Bago Region, the PDF attacked a police building using cluster bombs. In eastern Bago, 15 junta soldiers were killed in a Bago PDF raid on a police station in Yedashe Township. Thousands of civilians also fled Shwegyin Township as joint KNLA and NUG-led resistance forces seized three military outposts.

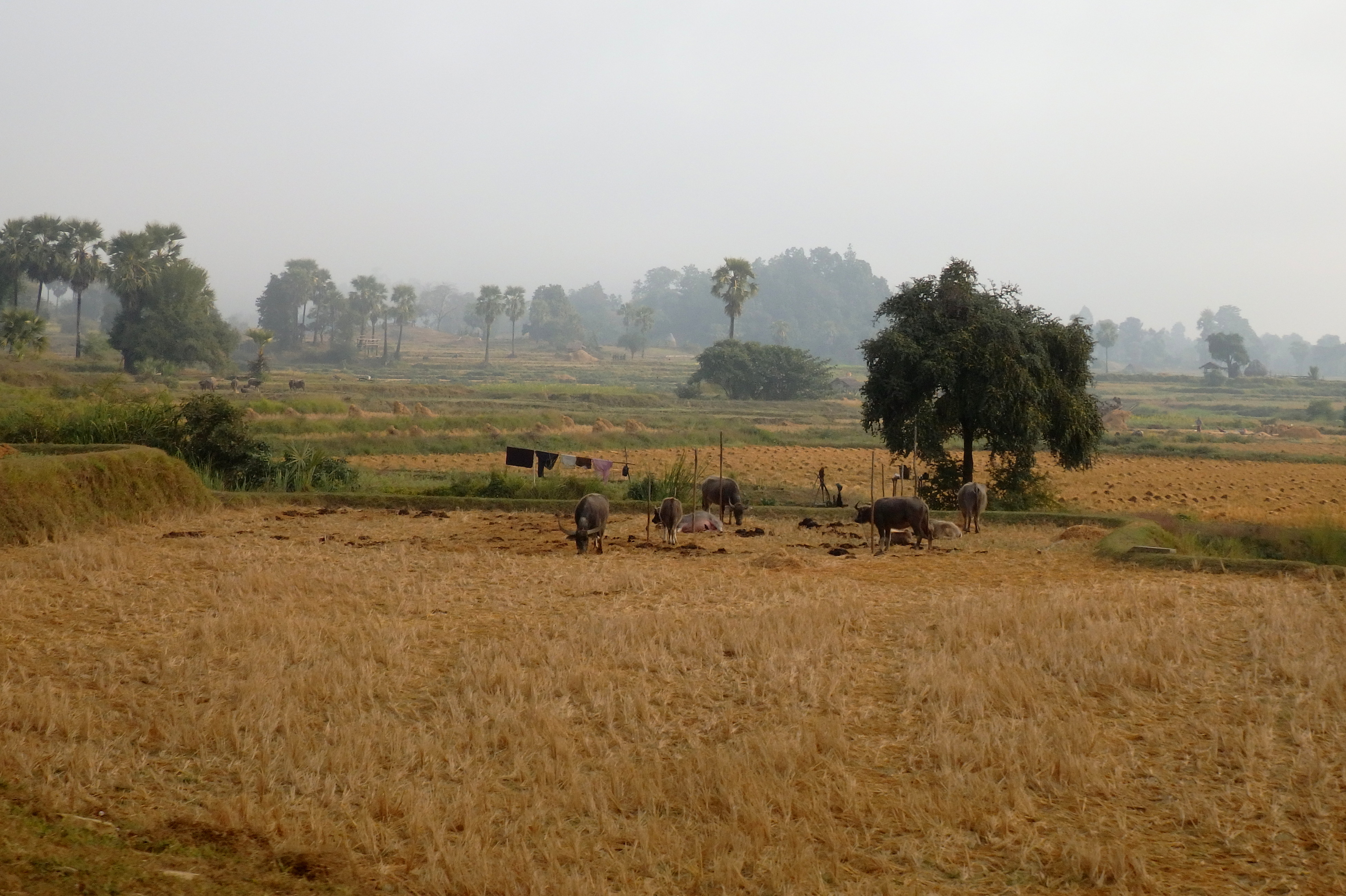
A rural area near Mawlaik, Sagaing Region

In early December, a video of PDF forces beating and shooting a woman dead emerged on social media. The NUG Ministry of Defence said that the incident happened in June in Tamu, Sagaing and that they were investigating the incident after detaining the perpetrators involved.

In early January 2023, PDF groups in Kani Township, Sagaing Region attacked junta supply ships, killing at least 25 soldiers. The junta increasingly used waterways for supplies, avoiding roadways in resistance-held areas. In April 2023, a combined PDF force from nearby townships seized the Tower Taing hill base Kani Township, killing 30 junta soldiers and seizing weapons.

In early 2023, the Mandalay PDF announced their intentions to ramp up military operations. Alongside the TNLA, they engaged in a series of intense clashes with the junta forces in Nawnghkio Township near the Shan-Mandalay border, killing at least 75 junta soldiers and wounding 60 others. A combined force of at least 900 junta and pro-junta militia troops attacked resistance positions with the help of artillery attacks and airstrikes during the clashes but were forced to retreat.

===== Urban attacks =====
In 2023, attacks in urban areas increased. In March 2023, the urban guerilla group Urban Owls assassinated Minn Tayzar Nyunt Tin, a legal and money-laundering aide to the junta with links to former Air Force commander General Myat Hein, in Thanlyin, Yangon. Minn Tayzar Nyunt Tin helped draft the repressive Cyber Security Law, which was seen as violating digital rights, privacy, and freedom of expression.

==== Junta retaliation and atrocities ====
In October 2022, battles and skirmishes increased as the junta committed several civilian atrocities. On 21 October, junta forces decapitated Saw Tun Moe, a high school teacher from Thit Nyi Naung, and impaled his head on a NUG-administered school's spiked gate after burning and looting Taung Myint village in Magway Region.

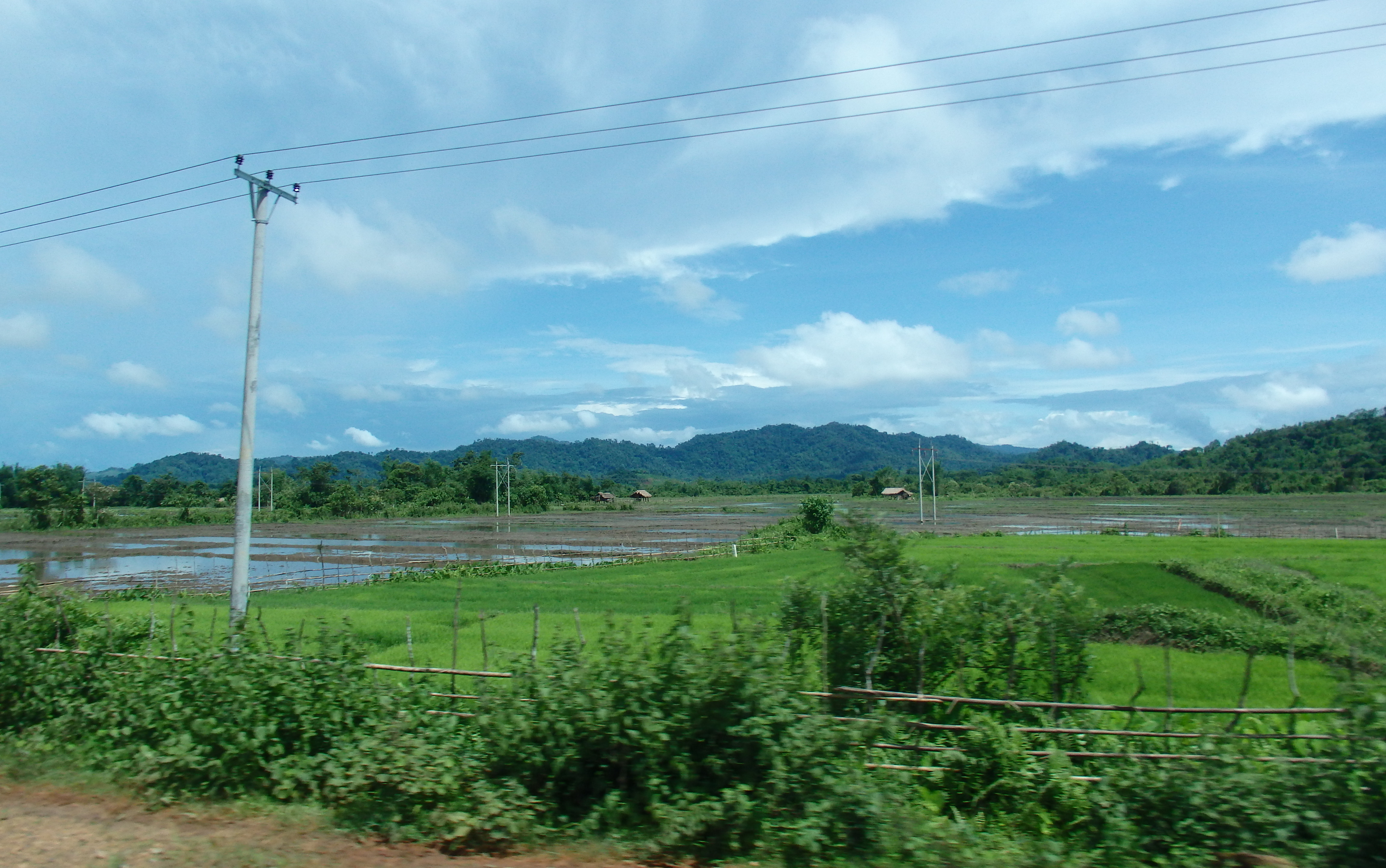
Mogaung Township, east of Hpakant

On 23 October, over 80 people were killed by an airstrike in Hpakant Township, Northern Myanmar, during an anniversary celebration for the Kachin Independence Organisation (KIO). At least 80 civilians were killed, making it the deadliest attack on civilians since the start of the renewed civil war. The junta denied civilian casualties while the United Nations condemned the attack.

In November 2022, the junta continued burning villages in Sagaing Region, including the home village of Cardinal Charles Maung Bo, the head of the Catholic Church in Myanmar. Junta soldiers also hid in civilian trucks impersonating workers to ambush local defence forces in Shwebo Township.

On 2 February 2023, Min Aung Hlaing imposed martial law in 37 townships with resistance activity, affecting millions of residents.

===== Scorched earth tactics =====
In November 2022, the dry season allowed the greater use of the Myanmar Air Force to weaken the resistance forces' ability to maintain strategic positions and outposts. Aerial bombardment, helicopter raids and artillery strikes typically followed skirmishes once junta ground forces sustained substantial losses and retreated. Once the entrapped forces were relieved by aerial support, they would engage in scorched earth tactics. World War Two veterans described the destruction as worse than that of the Burma campaign of World War II due to the deliberate targeting of civilian villages. The heavy use of air forces came alongside a decrease in the junta's ability to fight on the ground. During the week of 21 November, repeated junta air attacks along the Sagaing-Kachin border killed 80 and disrupted supply chains between the two resistance regions. The junta's scorched earth campaign stretched across northern Myanmar, burning bases and villages they could no longer defend. Thousands of residents fled during the campaign as hundreds of homes were destroyed. In early 2023, one scorched earth push by the junta aimed to resecure the Letpadaung Copper Mine in Salingyi Township for Chinese foreign workers planning to leave for their holidays.

On 23 February 2023, army troops launched a new military offensive in Sagaing, raiding and pillaging villages at the confluence of the Irrawaddy and Mu Rivers. During the offensive, troops from the 99th Light Infantry Division executed at least 17 villagers during the Tar Taing massacre.

=== Temporary stalemate (November 2022 – September 2023) ===
==== November 2022 Arakan ceasefire ====
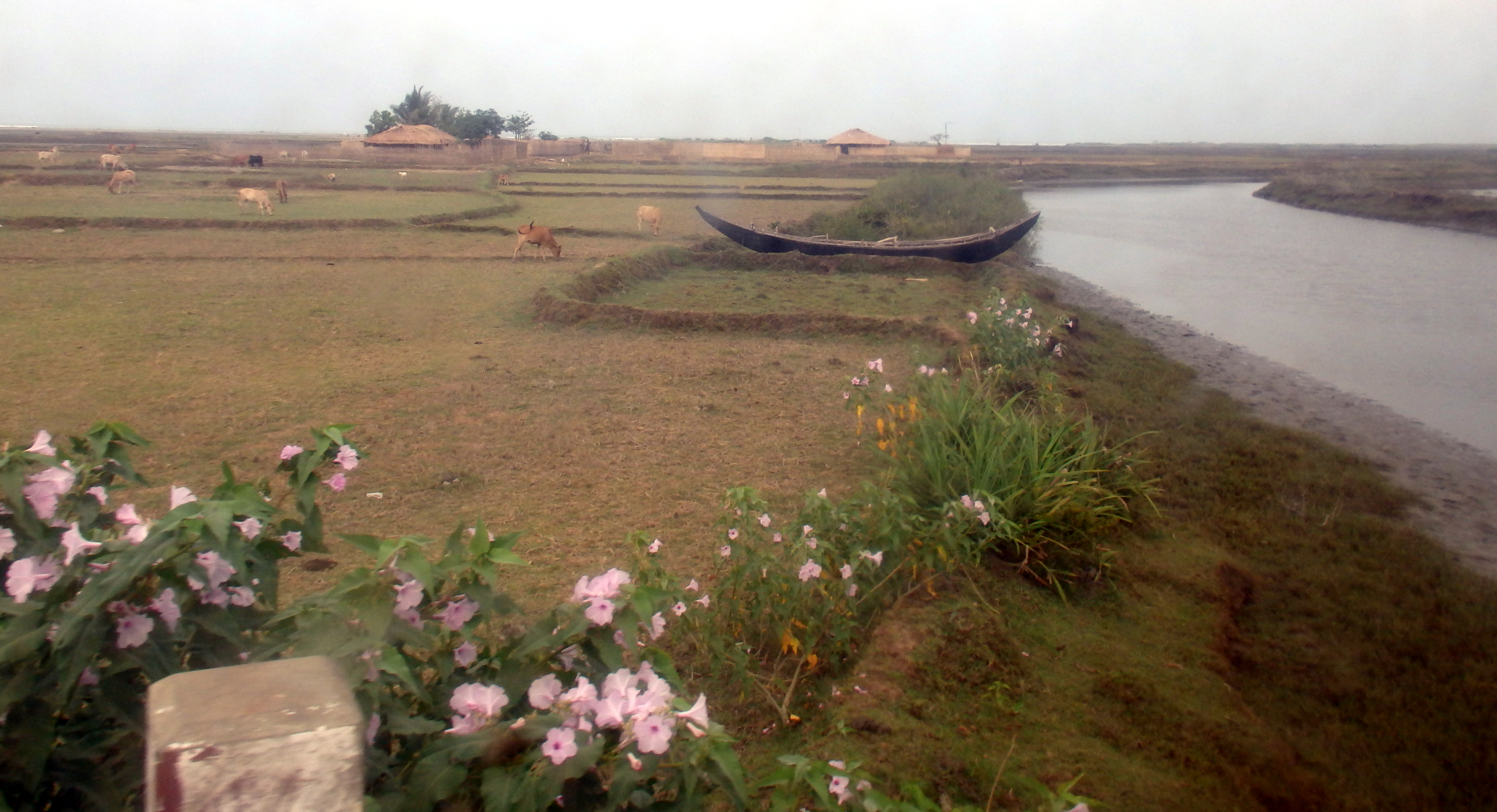
Fields in Maungdaw Township, northern Rakhine State

On 26 November 2022, the Arakan Army and the junta agreed to a temporary ceasefire starting on 27 November. The ceasefire was brokered by Yōhei Sasakawa of the Nippon Foundation. Arakan Army spokespeople maintained that they agreed to the ceasefire for humanitarian reasons, as opposed to international pressure. The Arakan Army did not withdraw from fortifications held at the time of the ceasefire. Junta spokespeople said that this was the first step towards a permanent ceasefire with the Arakan Army. As of mid-December, tensions remained high with forces from both sides remaining in deployment within northern Rakhine State.

==== Subsequent new fronts ====
On 30 November, the military launched a major assault on the Kokang Myanmar National Democratic Alliance Army using heavy weapons on a base near Chinshwehaw by the Chinese border. This assault continued into 2 December, reportedly sending 500 junta soldiers.

The military continued its campaign in northern Shan State against the Ta'ang National Liberation Army (TNLA). On 7 December 2022, the junta launched a ground offensive on the TNLA in the Battle of Namhsan using aerial bombs. After six days of fighting, the TNLA captured four villages from junta's control, killing 70 soldiers and capturing 28. On 17 December, the junta retreated, claiming that they had reached an agreement with TNLA, and that they intended to target the PDF forces and attacked the TNLA in mistake. The TNLA rejected the statement. Continued clashes in late December forced over a thousand civilians to flee to Mogok.

==== 2023 guerrilla attacks ====
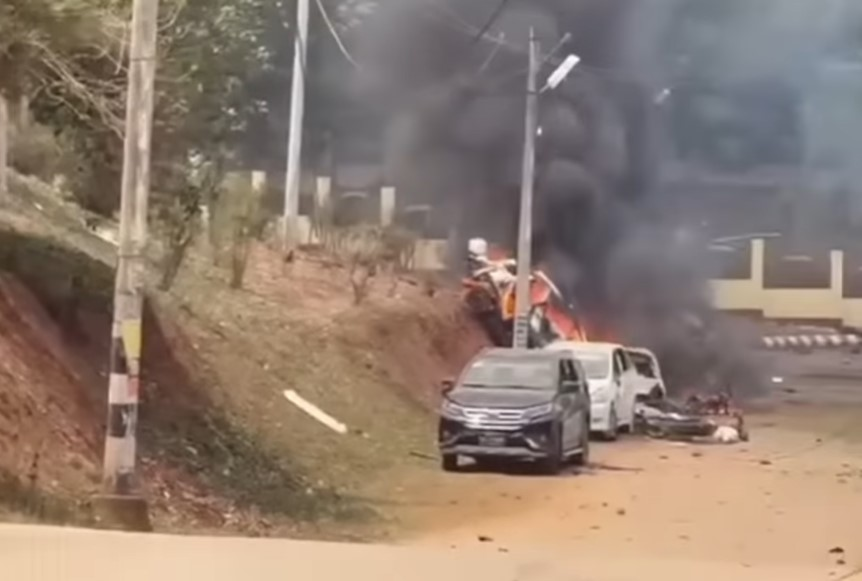
Burning Car in Lashio, April 2023

According to analysts in early 2023, the civil war was in a stalemate. Despite several successful engagements, there was still a significant disparity in power between the joint resistance forces and the junta. The PDF and EAOs faced resource constraints as they primarily relied on donations for funding and underground channels to acquire arms. The resistance also increasingly used coordinated drone attacks, such as on 27 August 2023, when 11 resistance groups jointly conducted drone strikes in Sagaing Township, killing 17 soldiers.

In early April, the Kawthoolei Army (KTLA) launched an offensive on the Karen State Border Guard Force (BGF)-held Shwe Kokko. After the reported capture of 5 BGF bases, by 8 April, the offensive began to stall. After junta/BGF counterattacks, the KTLA was forced to retreat, receiving heavy losses. The KNU stated that they did not approve of these attacks, nor that they would accept the KTLA in their territory.

On 19 June 2023, the Urban Owls guerilla group assassinated former air force major Ye Khaing, the operations director of Yangon International Airport in Mingaladon Township, Yangon. Ye Khaing was allegedly detaining anti-junta activists at the airport. Urban Owls also claimed that Ye Khaing was a confidante of Steven Law.

In late June 2023, a combined resistance force of PDF and KNLA took control of the National Highway 8 in Mon State, installing checkpoints and arresting junta personnel. The Ye Township-based resistance group Ye Belu launched successive guerrilla attacks, including an attack in Lamaing, assassinating a Pyusawhti militia leader in Duya, and ambushing junta army convoya. The attacks caused a breakdown in junta administration throughout Ye Township.

On 10 August 2023, junta forces clashed with a coalition of several rebel groups at Thandaung, near Nay Pyi Taw. On 15 September, they carried out the first documented resistance drone attack, targeting the Aye Lar military base near Nay Pyi Taw International Airport with 2 makeshift bombs.

On August and September 2023, the Zomi Revolutionary Army (ZRA) raided 2 Chinland Defense Force (CDF) outposts in Tonzang Township, killing 2 CDF soldiers, continuing clashes between the groups which have been occurring since 2021 despite the ZRA issuing a public statement of support for anti-junta resistance in 2021.

==== 2023 monsoon offensives ====
In August 2023, the NUG claimed that 3,012 junta troops were killed between January and July 2023. In Kayah state alone, 667 military junta troops and 99 resistance members were killed. In a September interview, Duwa Lashi La claimed that resistance forces had taken effective control of about 60% of Myanmar's territory.

In early June 2023, a coalition force led by KNLA ambushed junta forces at Don Tha Mi bridge checkpoints on the border of Karen and Mon States, inflicting heavy casualties. They also raided the police station and junta offices in Kyain Seikgyi Township.

In Kayah State on 13 June 2023, the Karenni National People's Liberation Front (KNPLF), broke the ceasefire they had since 2009 and openly defected to anti-junta forces. The KNPLF began attacking Burmese military positions, joining forces with KA, KNDF, KNLA, and PDF, and seizing junta outposts in the Battle of Mese. The combined forces took over Mese Township in Eastern Kayah State. 430 soldiers of the Light Infantry Battalion, including their commander, surrendered to the resistance. Later in July, KNLA forces and allies captured the Lat Khat Taung hill junta base, which the junta failed to recapture.

From July to September 2023, the Ta'ang National Liberation Army and the Mandalay People's Defence Force jointly conducted Operation Kanaung against junta forces in the Mandalay Region. Over that period, 76 junta soldiers were killed, 19 were wounded, and a large amount of weapons and ammunition were seized.

=== Operation 1027 and concurrent offensives (October 2023 – January 2024) ===
==== Operation 1027 (Phase 1) ====
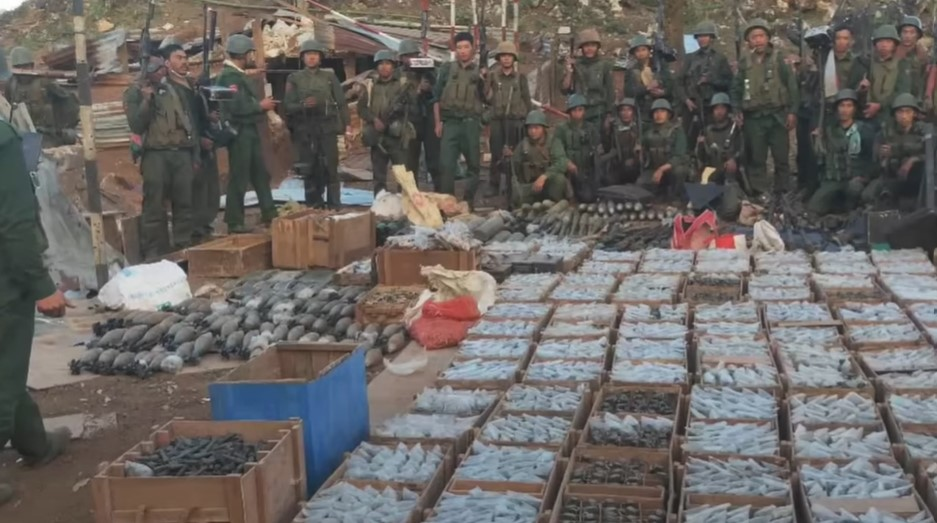
Captured Tatmadaw equipment in Kawlin, November 2023

Map of anti-junta gains from Phase 1 of Operation 1027 as of 19 March 2024

On 27 October 2023, the Three Brotherhood Alliance initiated Operation 1027, targeting the junta's checkpoints and bases near Lashio and trade posts near Chinshwehaw. Chinshwehaw fell into ethnic armies' hands. Within days, the coalition forces captured 57 bases, and the junta responded with aerial bombardments.

Nawnghkio fell under TNLA and Mandalay PDF control Combined AA and KIA forces captured Gangdau Yang base on the Myitkyina-Bhamo road. The junta acknowledged having lost control of three towns in Northern Shan State, including Pang Hseng. TNLA, MNDAA, and AA declared control over four towns, including Hsenwi.

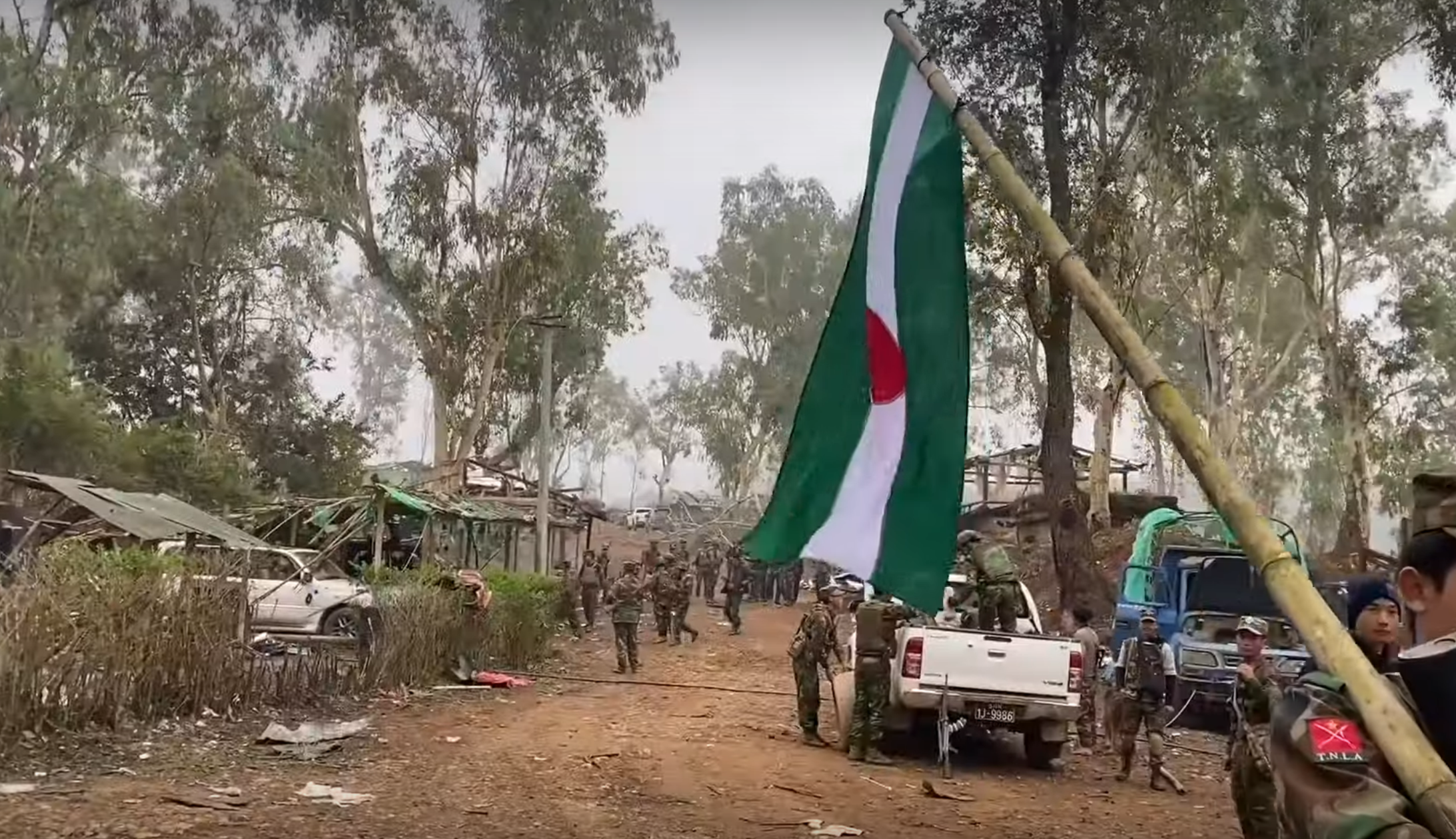
TNLA captured the Shan State towns of Namhkam

In early November, TNLA forces seized Namhkam, Shan State and nearby bridges and road gates. Kawlin also fell to the coalition, marking the first district-level capital to fall to the resistance. The coalition took Khampat, Kunlong and Monekoe across northern Myanmar, re-establishing local government functions after securing towns. They also took the strategic Goktwin bridge near the Goteik viaduct on the main Mandalay-China highway.

Through December, the TNLA seized Namhsan and Mantong taking over the entire Pa Laung Self-Administered Zone.

The Shan State Progress Party (SSPP) and the Restoration Council of Shan State (RCSS) declared a truce between their respective armies in response to the Operation.

In early December, the Tatmadaw allegedly asked China to pressure the Three Brotherhood Alliance to stop Operation 1027. On 11 December, China helped hold peace talks between the Tatmadaw and various rebel groups. The Brotherhood Alliance announced on 13 December that these talks "lasted only 10 minutes" and vowed to continue fighting.

In late January 2024, BBC News said that the "bloody two-year stalemate" of the civil war appeared to "have been broken" with the success of the offense of the three ethnic armies in Operation 1027.

===== Arakan Army offensive =====
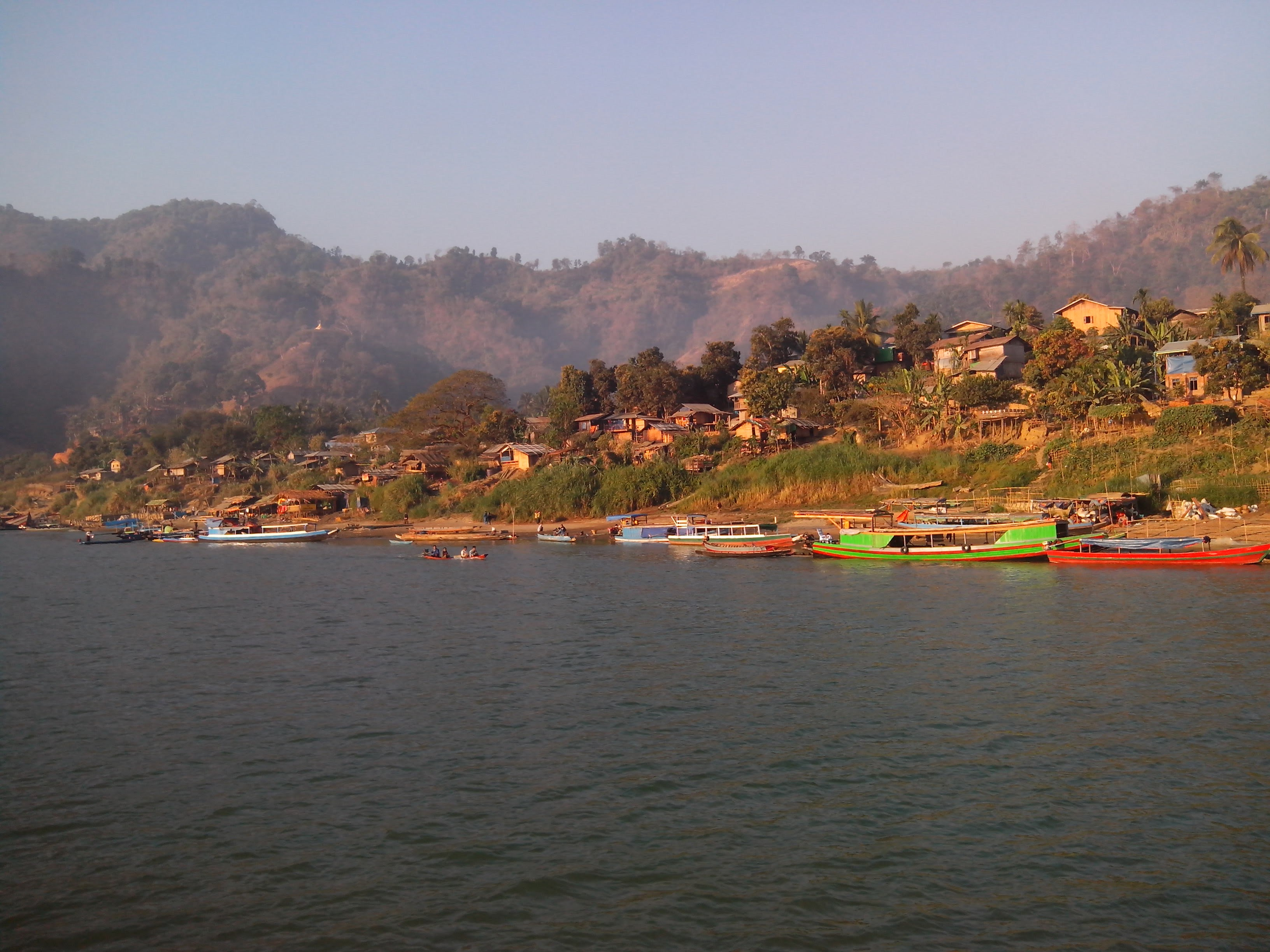
Paletwa seen from the Kaladan River, 2015

On the morning of 13 November 2023, as part of Operation 1027, the Arakan Army (AA) attacked two Border Guard Police stations in Rathedaung Township, breaking the Rakhine State Ceasefire Agreement between the junta and the Arakan Army. Dong Paik camp was captured by 6:30 am. On 14 November, the junta had already abandoned around 40 outposts in Rakhine state after attacks by the Arakan Army, but few came under their immediate control. Dozens of Myanmar security officers surrendered to the Arakan Army the following day.

On 14 November, the Arakan Army launched an offensive in Paletwa Township in neighbouring Chin State. The Arakan Army accused the Tatmadaw of using chemical weapons during the ensuing battles.

The following night, the Arakan Army launched an attack on Pauktaw, seizing the township police station. By the next morning, the Arakan Army had taken control of the town. The junta sent two helicopter gunships alongside naval support to fire back, including at civilian housing, with heavy machine gun fire. Pauktaw's proximity to the Rakhine state capital, Sittwe, posed a threat to the junta. Junta forces detained about 100 residents who were unable to flee, and positioned themselves to surround the town, using two navy ships to blockade the harbour.

On 6 December, the Arakan Army would capture a major military base in the township.

===== Battle of Laukkai =====
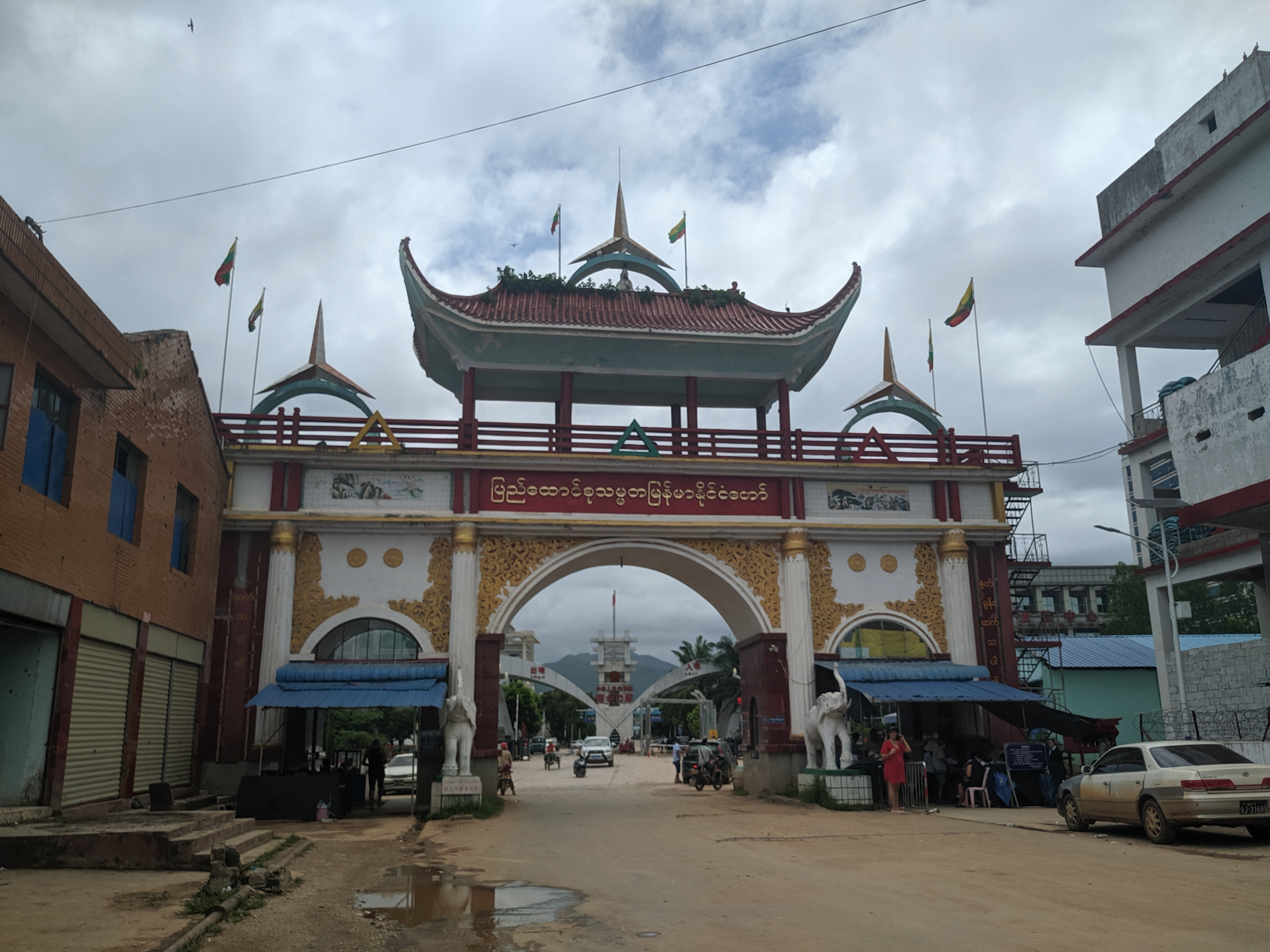
China–Myanmar border gate near Laukkai

In late November and December 2023, the Myanmar National Democratic Alliance Army (MNDAA) closed in on Laukkai, the capital of the Kokang Self-Administered Zone. They seized several strategic positions from the junta forces during the ensuing Battle of Laukkai. MNDAA forces attacked junta bases around the city in early December. On 26 December, ninety junta soldiers surrendered to the MNDAA. and, two days later, the artillery shelling of Laukkai would stop as the city mostly fell under MNDAA control. On 5 January 2024, the MNDAA seized control of the junta battalion headquarters in Laukkai and gained full control of the city.

A few days later, the Three Brotherhood Alliance claimed it had captured the towns of Kutkai and Theinni on 8 January after seizing junta military posts in the towns, including the headquarters of the 16th Military Operations Command in Theinni. On 23 January, the Tatmadaw sentenced three of the brigadier generals who surrendered at Laukkai to death and the other three to life imprisonment, under military law.

In the wake of these gains and the fall of Laukkai, on 12 January, China announced that it had negotiated another ceasefire between the junta and the 3BA, known as the "Haigeng Agreement". The two sides agreed to disengage personnel and to not compromise the safety of Chinese border residents. However, the following day, the TNLA reported that the junta had broken their agreement with airstrikes in Lashio Township and Kyaukme Township.

===== Tatmadaw defensive response =====
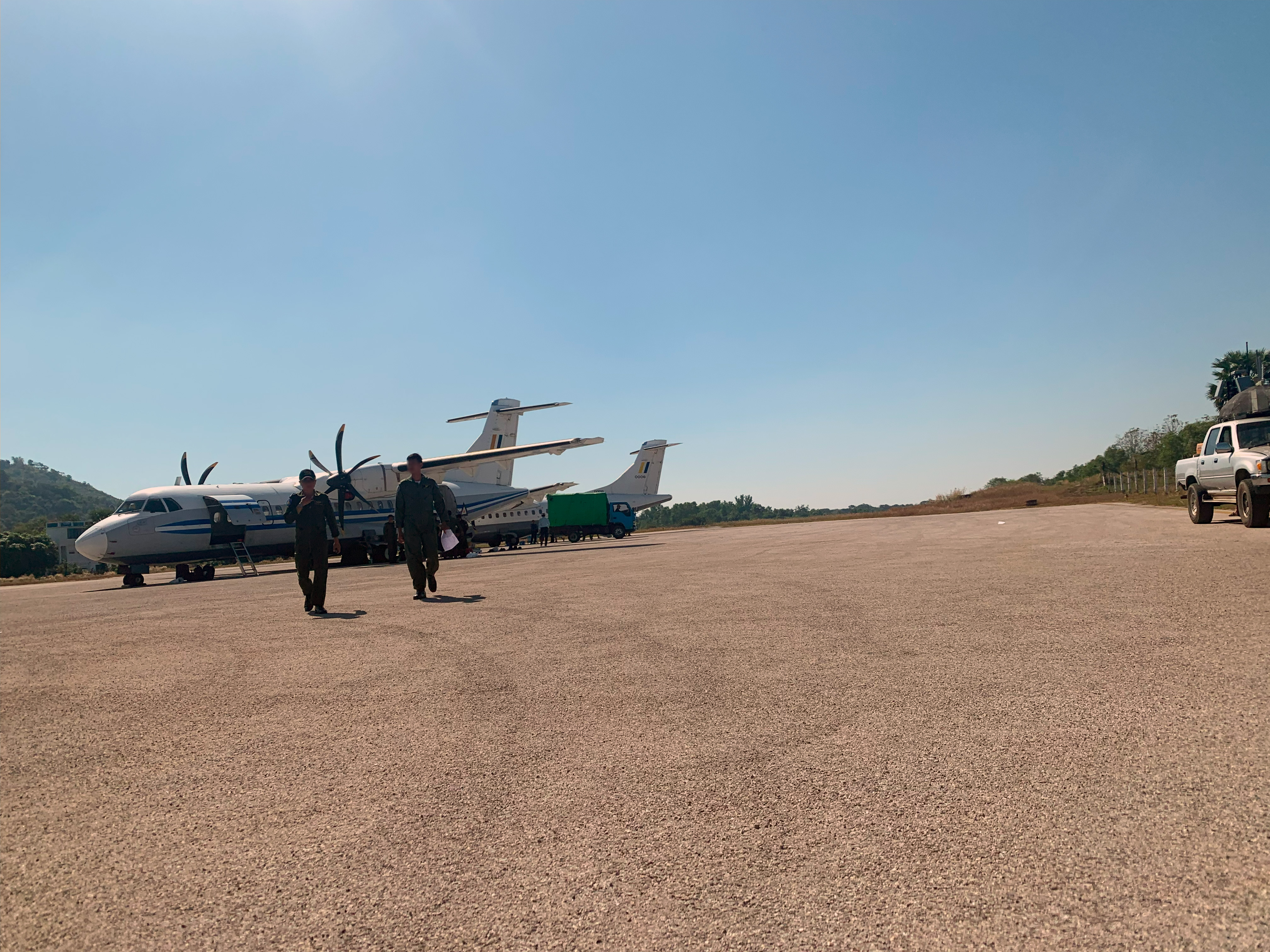
Two ATR-42 of the Myanmar Air Force at Mawlamyine Airport

The Irrawaddy reported on 22 November 2023 that the Tatmadaw was preparing 14,000 soldiers for the defence of Naypyitaw, including by moving troops from other regions to the capital and mobilizing civil servants into the military. These preparations started soon after Operation 1027 was launched against the Tatmadaw. In addition, the Tatmadaw was preparing 10,000 troops for the defence of Mandalay, Bago and Yangon. There were also fortification works beginning, with Naypyitaw police stations "also preparing concrete blocks, sandbags and other materials needed to transform into defensive bases in just a few days".

Ronan Lee, a professor at Loughborough University, stated that the recent strategic reversals, nationwide territorial losses and economic decline meant momentum had strongly shifted away from Myanmar's junta, and the junta "may now be in a death spiral".

==== Concurrent operations ====
Tatmadaw convoy near Pyin Oo Lwin, October 2023

Operation 1027 was supported by several concurrent operations by other anti-junta groups elsewhere in the country, including in the eastern regions Shan State and Kayah State. In northern Shan State, the KNLA and PDF clashed with the Tatmadaw around the town of Kawkareik in late October 2023. In Mese Township (part of Kayah State), the KNPLF, KA and KNDF launched a joint military operation called Operation 1107 that captured several border posts starting on 7 November. Four days later, they launched the major Operation 1111 against Loikaw, the capital of Kayah State. The military operations in Kayah displaced tens of thousands of civilians, especially from Loikaw. After over a month of heavy fighting, rebel forces had won control of 85% of the capital. Nonetheless, fighting continued into January. By late January, however, the offensive on Loikaw had mostly stalled.

Other anti-junta forces launched Operation Taungthaman in Madaya Township, Mandalay Region. On 13 November, fighting erupted in Kinn Village, eastern Madaya Township between the TNLA and the junta, who responded with air and artillery strikes and later burned the village down. By 28 November, PDF and TNLA forces captured a junta base in the township. The TNLA additionally supported the operations with attacks in Nawnghkio and Kyaukme Townships in southern Shan State to cut off junta reinforcements.

==== Chin offensive ====
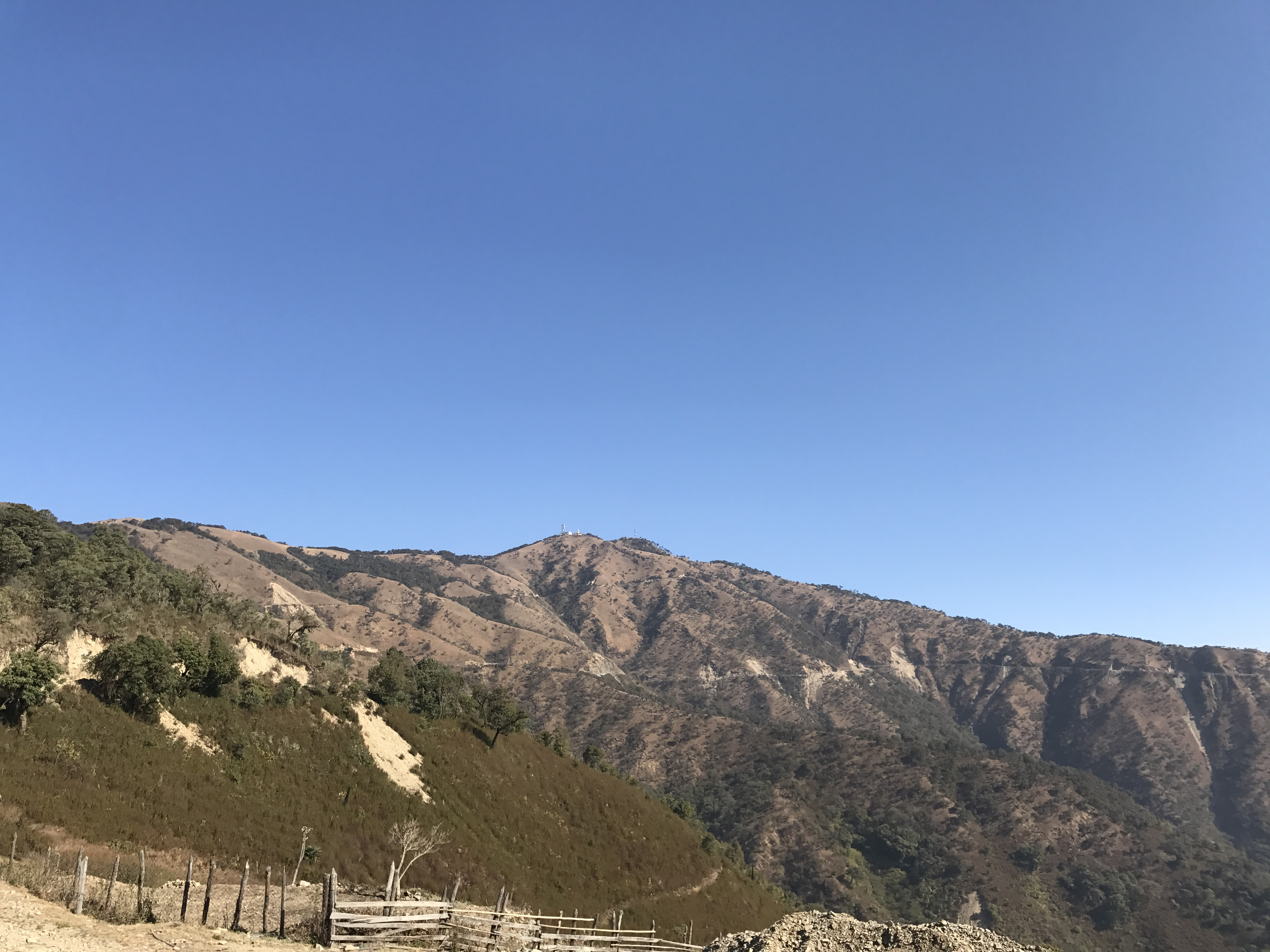
Kennedy Peak, Chin State

On the morning of 13 November 2023, after two days of fighting, the Chin National Army (CNA) and local Chinland Defense Force (CDF) units, captured the town of Rikhawdar on the India–Myanmar border. This marked the first town captured by resistance forces in Chin State since the coup. At least 40 junta soldiers and police officers fled to the Indian state of Mizoram, where they surrendered and were eventually repatriated. The Chin National Defence Force (CNDF), took a junta camp on the Mizoram border two days later. The following week on 21 November, local Zoland PDF units seized a military base on Kennedy Peak, the second highest mountain in Chin State. Over the next week, CNA and its allies captured Lailenpi and Rezua in Matupi Township.

On 6 December 2023, the Chin National Front ratified the Chinland Constitution, proclaiming the state of Chinland.

On 17 January 2024, the Taingen camp on the Falam road to the Indian border was captured, with Chin resistance forces seizing arms and ammunition. On 20 January 2024, after more than 600 junta soldiers and refugees crossed the India–Myanmar border, the Government of India announced a plan to fence the entire border.

=== New conflict landscape (January 2024–May 2024) ===
Following the fall of Laukkai and the junta facing serious threats by the Three Brotherhood Alliance, the war has turned into a more multipolar landscape with borderlands being seized by powerful anti-junta groups with significant implications for the foreign relations of Myanmar. Groups not part of the alliance took advantage of the situation, but remained constrained by both tense relations and limited coordination.

==== Rakhine offensive intensifies ====
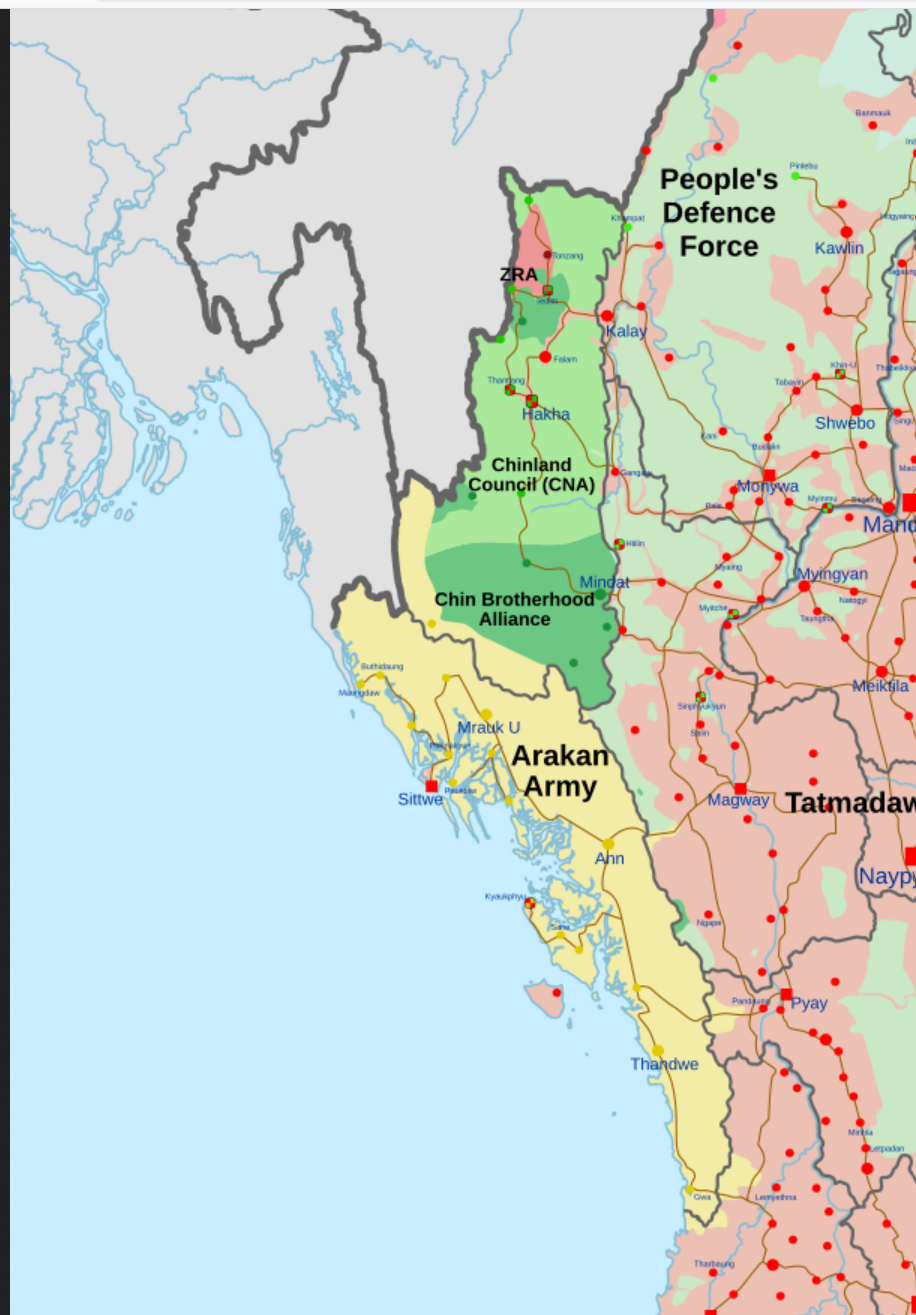
Map of gains made by the Arakan Army since 2023

On 8 January 2024, the Arakan Army continued their offensive and captured the Taung Shey Taung base and its 200 junta soldiers in Kyauktaw Township, Rakhine State. On 15 January, the Arakan Army seized Paletwa, a strategic town for Indo-Myanmar infrastructure projects, and the entire township in Chin State. A week later, the Arakan Army captured the town of Pauktaw in Rakhine State concluding a three-month battle.

On 3 February 2024, as the clashes between Arakan Army and Tatmadaw increased in Rakhine, mortar shells and several bullets reportedly landed in Bangladesh's territory, which injured some local residents near Ukhia, Cox's Bazar. At least 229 Myanmar Border Guard Police (BGP) personnel entered Bangladesh seeking refuge from AA, where the Border Guard Bangladesh (BGB) disarmed them.

Between 4 and 6 February, the Arakan Army launched attacks on Rakhine BGP outposts in Maungdaw Township, later alleging without providing evidence that the Arakan Rohingya Salvation Army and Rohingya Solidarity Organisation (RSO) fought alongside the Rakhine BGP. The RSO denounced AA's accusations and the AA labeling them as "Bengalis" among other issues. Later in February, when the junta began conscripting largely non-citizen displaced Rohingyas living in Kyaukphyu, the AA urged Rohingya people to flee into AA-controlled areas.

===== Fall of Mrauk U =====
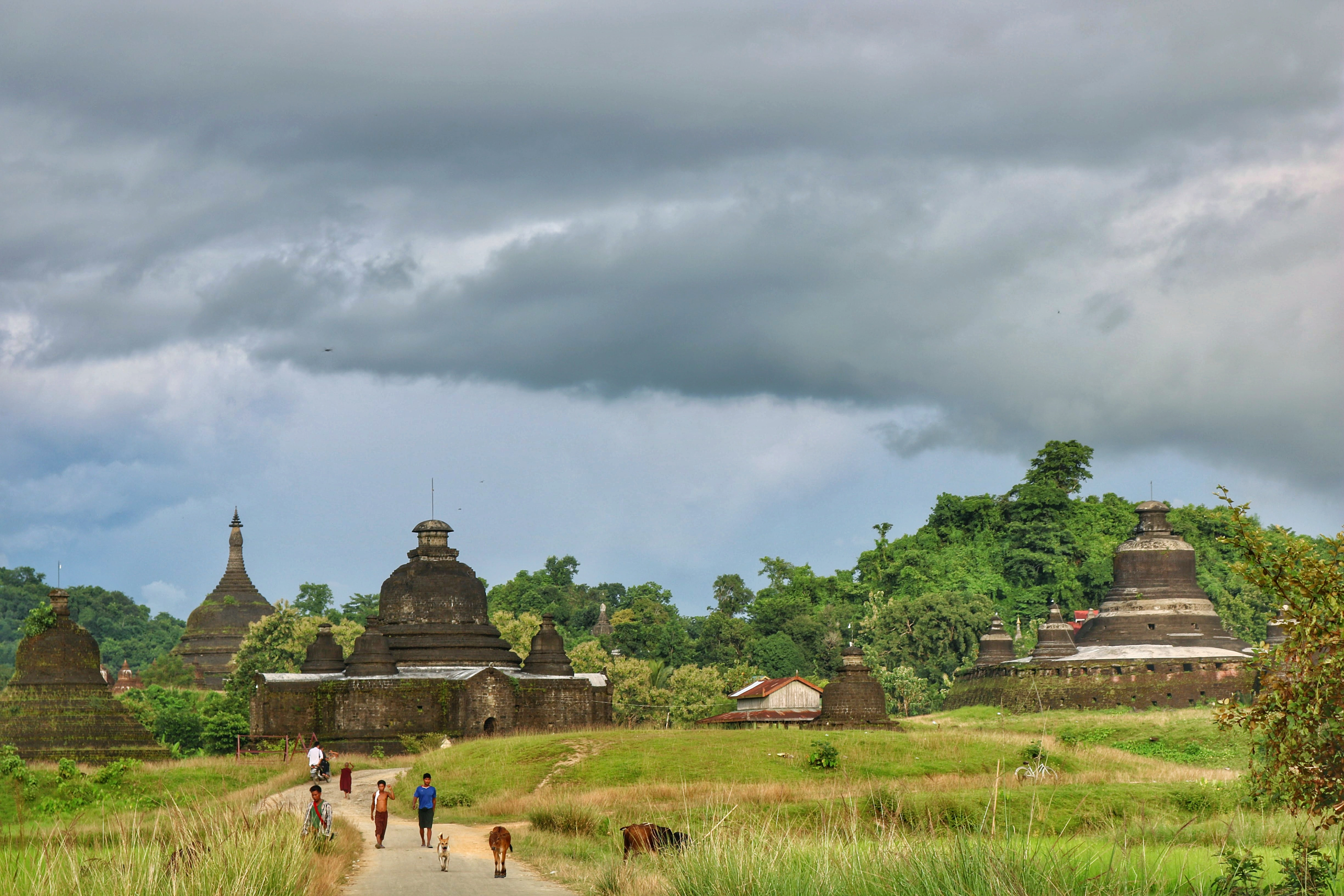
Mrauk U ancient temples in 2017

The Arakan Army captured most remaining Tatmadaw bases in Minbya Township by 6 February 2024. It captured Kyauktaw the next day and continued fighting in Mrauk U and Ramree. The Tatmadaw abandoned Myebon to reinforce Kyaukphyu on 9 February, leaving ammunition behind in their rush and abandoning the southern township of Mrauk-U District.

On 10 February 2024, the Arakan Army took the district capital town of Mrauk U, completing their control over the township. During the battle, three Myanmar Navy landing craft were reportedly sunk. Over the following week, the Arakan Army consolidated control over the district, capturing Myebon on 15 February and capturing the remainder of Minbya Township on 28 February.

==== New Shan State combatants ====
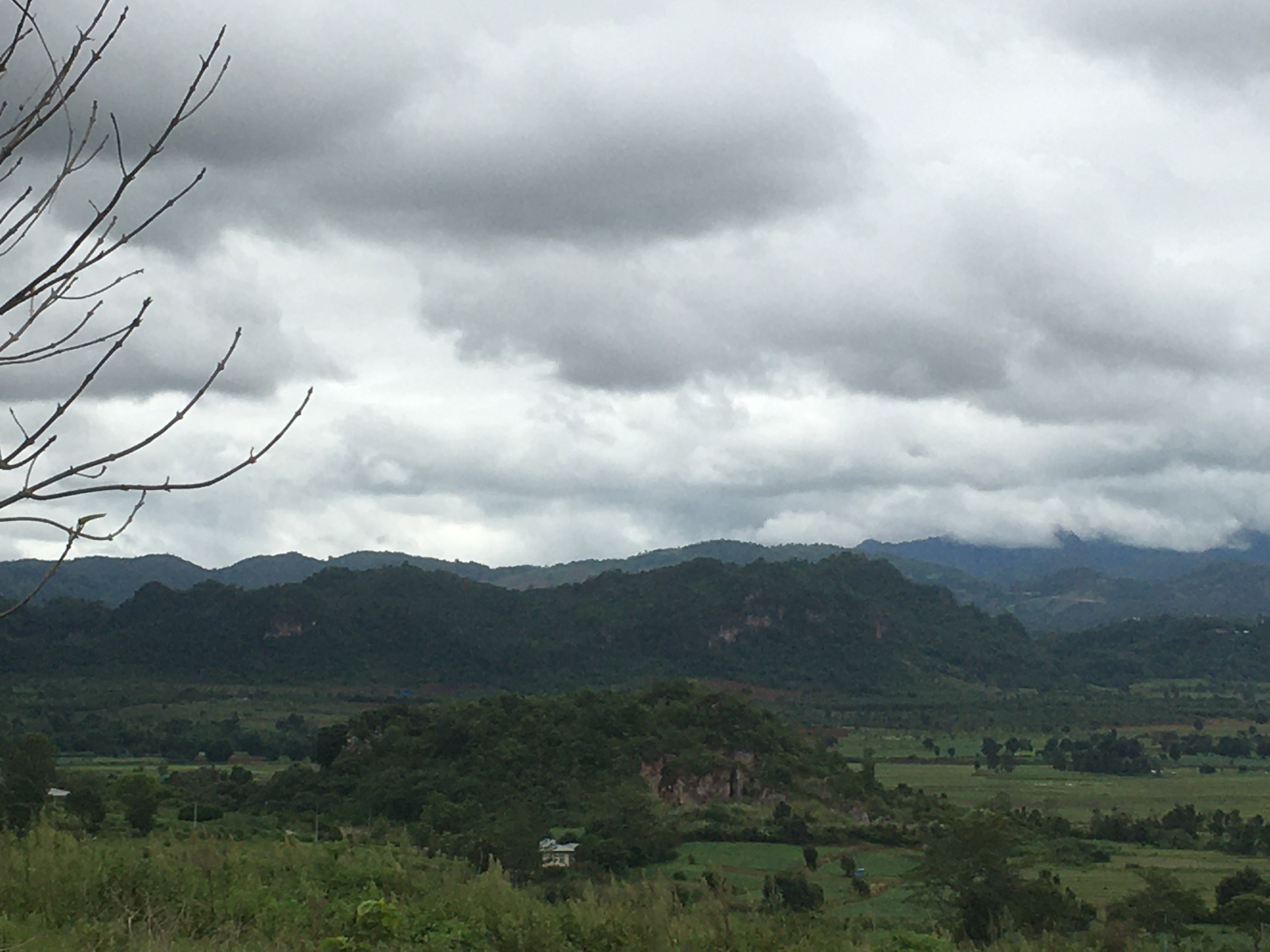
Southern Shan state mountains near Hopong

The southern Shan state theatre also re-emerged when the Tatamadaw and the Pa-O National Army (PNA) attempted to confiscate the Pa-O National Liberation Army (PNLA)'s weapons on 20 January. The PNLA, supported by KNDF and PDF forces, attacked Hsi Hseng and captured it on 26 January.

Local activists reported that junta shelling killed 40 civilians in the Pa-O Self-Administered Zone. Towards the end of February, clashes between junta/PNA forces and PNLA forces broke out east of Hopong and along the Taunggyi-Loilem road. The junta regained control of Hsi Hseng by late March, amid accusations of using chemical bombs.

Between 26 and 27 March the MNDAA and the Shan State Army (SSPP) clashed in Hseni Township after the alleged MNDAA bombing of SSPP camps. On 27 May, after a month of warnings, the TNLA began blockading several villages in Namhkam Township and detaining SSPP soldiers stationed in those villages. In response, the SSPP withdrew from camps in Hsenwi, Kutkai, and Pang Hseng.

The United Nations voiced deep concern over renewed fighting in eastern Myanmar and allegations that the military employed heavy weapons against civilians and abducted children to join its ranks. Its special advisers highlighted the responsibility of the military to protect all people.

==== Junta counteroffensive in Anyar ====
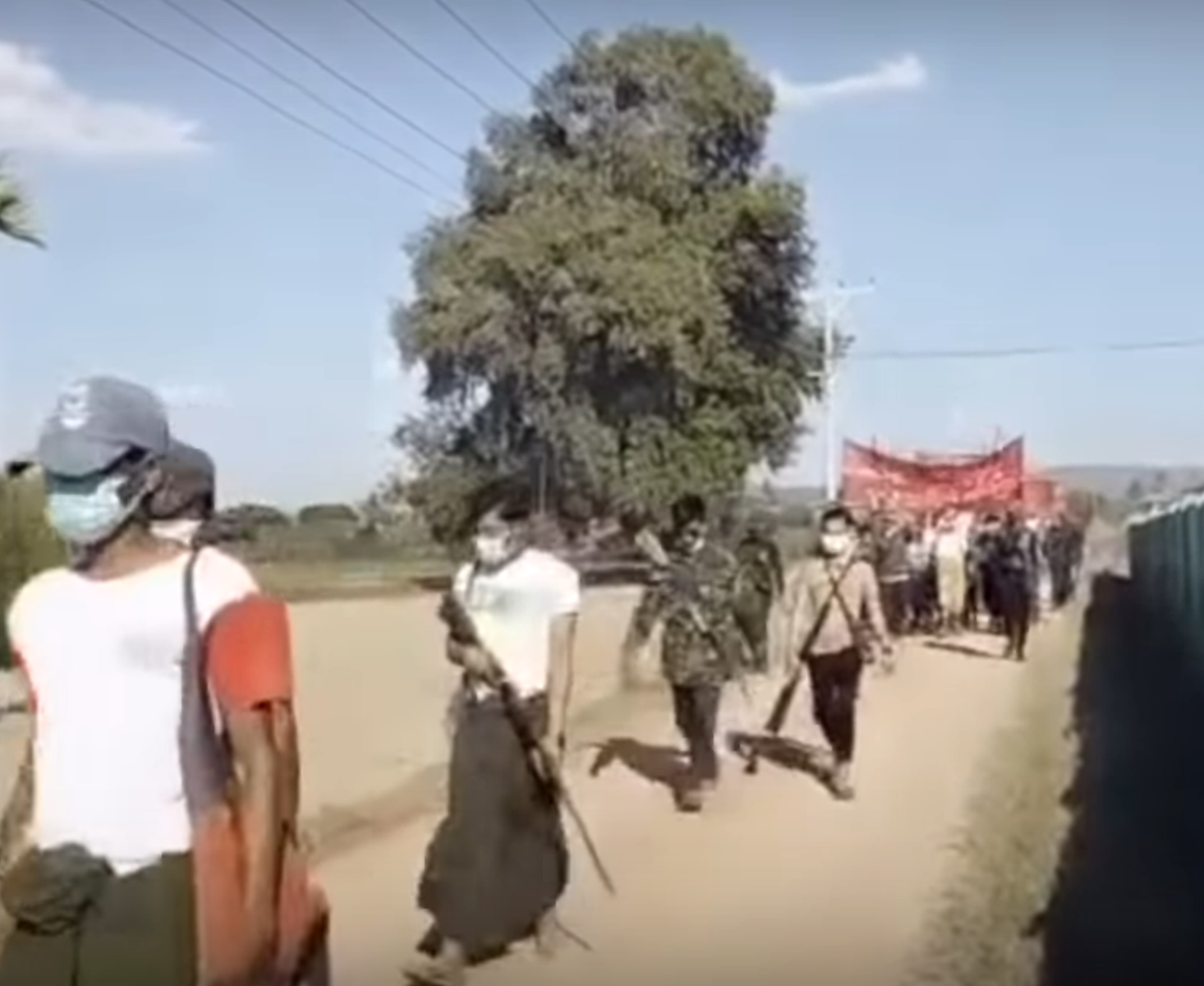
Local People's Defense Forces guard an anti-SAC junta protest in Kani Township

Tatmadaw forces recaptured the district capital of Kawlin on 10 February after almost 10 days of fighting. Junta forces razed the town, destroying the majority of homes in Kawlin and surrounding villages. On 22 February, junta forces attempted to recapture the town of Maw Luu from the KIA and ABSDF. On 14 March, junta forces took the village of Kampani, Kalay Township to weaken anti-junta attacks on Kalay. Despite this campaign, on 16 March resistance forces captured the Pyusawhti-controlled village of Kyaung Taik north of Kalay.

While the junta launched its counteroffensives, the allied resistance launched an offensive to capture Kani, capturing around 80% of the town by 7 March. After almost 10 days of fighting, by 15 March, rebels were forced to retreat after overwhelming junta resistance.

On 4 April 2024, the PDF launched an unprecedented drone attack against Aye Lar Air Base, the main Tatmadaw headquarters, and Min Aung Hlaing's residence in the capital, Naypyidaw. Almost 30 drones were deployed; junta forces claimed 7 were shot down while Myawaddy TV said 13 fixed-wing drones were shot down and there were no casualties or damage to property. NUG claimed the attack was "a success". On 12 April, the local People's Defense Forces claimed that they killed over a dozen junta soldiers in another attack on Aye Lar Air Base.

On 19 April junta forces launched a counteroffensive to retake Shwe Pyi Aye, Homalin Township, after it was captured in November 2023.

==== Junta control of Karen weakens ====
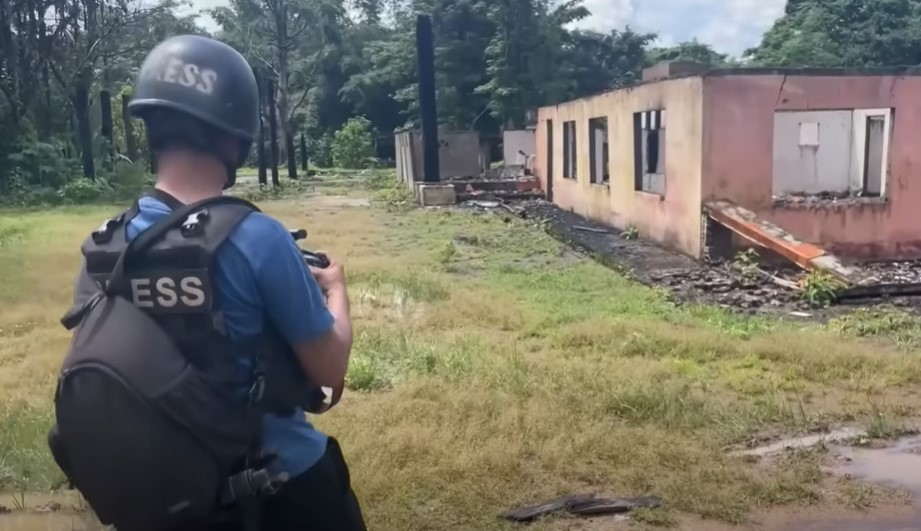
Journalist in front of a destroyed building, Karen State

After Operation 1027 and the Battle of Kawkareik in October 2023, the KNLA continued to make gains throughout Karen State, Mon State, Bago Region, and Tanintharyi Region. On 29 January 2024, KNLA and PDF forces shot down a Tatmadaw Eurocopter AS365, killing Brigadier General Aye Min Naung of the 44th Light Infantry Division. In late February, PDF and KNLA forces took most of Myitta, Tanintharyi Region. By 29 February, KNLA and aligned forces captured half of Kawkareik township, gaining fire control over the Myawaddy-Kawkareik highway. The KNLA continued gaining pushing east on the highway, capturing the Hpu Lu Gyi camp, south of Myawaddy, after a "five minute fight". This camp held both strategic and moral significance as the historic staging point for attacks on Manerplaw and Kawmoora after the junta captured it in 1990. The next day, KNLA forces captured a junta base in Kyaikdon. Fighting also broke out in KNLA 7th Brigade territory near Methawaw, forcing a junta retreat.

Tensions also rose between the junta and the Karen State Border Guard Force (BGF), who refused orders to engage in battle and withdrew from their bases in Papun. On 23 January, deputy commander-in-chief Soe Win met with Karen BGF leader Colonel Saw Chit Thu The Karen BGF announced they would no longer accept salaries from the junta, and would remain "neutral" in the conflict. Later, on 6 March, the Karen BGF announced it would rename itself to the "Karen National Army".

==== Kachin conflict escalates ====
While the KIA is a very close military and political partner of the Three Brotherhood Alliance, being part of the Northern Alliance, it was not affected by the Chinese-brokered ceasefire. Combined forces of the KIA, ABSDF, and Kachin PDF captured the town of Mongmit on 19 January and neighboring Mabein on the 20th. The next day, they captured the strategically significant Man Wein Gyi base near Ruili. The junta recaptured Mongmit on 25 January.

The KIA also intensified attacks in Hpakant Township, capturing a camp southwest of Hpakant on 20 January and threatening the Myitkyina-Hpakant road with the capture of Namtein outpost on 2 February. There were also attacks in Mansi Township, including the capture of the Si Kham Gyi base, which had been held by the junta for 30 years.

===== "Operation 0307" =====
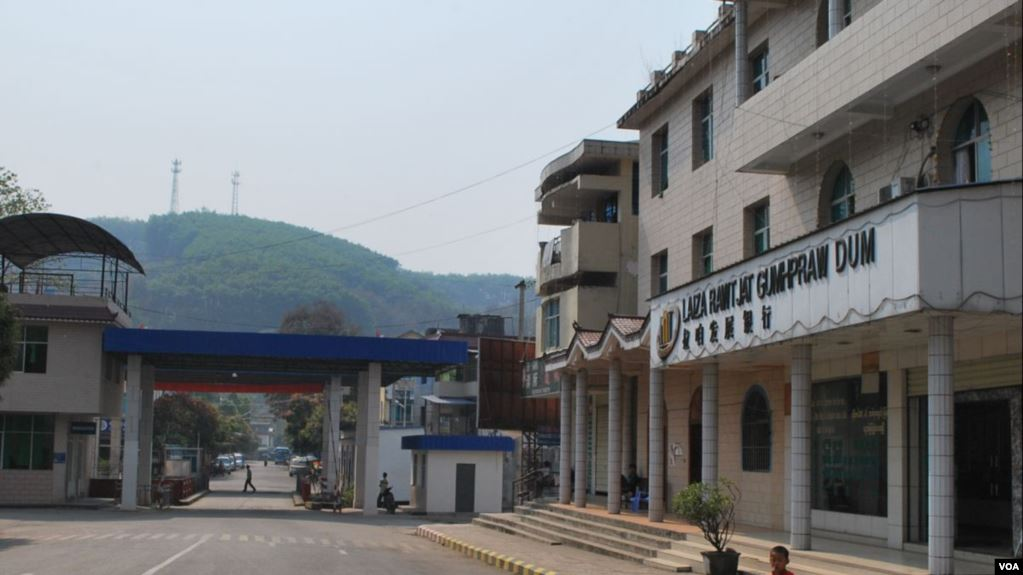
China–Myanmar border gate in Laiza, 2015

On 7 March the KIA simultaneously launched attacks on over ten junta outposts in eastern Kachin. Fighting primarily took place along the highway between Bhamo and the Kachin State capital, Myitkyina, as well as around Laiza. The attacks were the beginning of a wider offensive in Kachin State- colloquially termed Operation 0307. Over 8 March, the KIA seized three major junta bases and several outposts, including Hpyun Pyen Bum, the junta's closest forward base to KIA headquarters in Laiza. The KIA and AA defending Laiza alleged that junta airstrikes had landed on the Chinese side of the border, east of Laiza. During the fighting, the leader of the junta-aligned Lisu "Wuyang People's Militia", U Shwe Min, was killed. By 22 March, the KIA claimed to have captured over 50 military outposts and 13 strategically significant junta bases around the Myitkyina-Bhamo Road.

In April, the KIA had captured the key Chinese border trade hub of Lweje, cut off a major road to Hpakant, and captured Sezin. and Hsinbo. Within Hsinbo, they cut off the Bhamo-Myitkyina road and encircled Bhamo. The KIA then launched simultaneous offensives throughout Waingmaw Township and around Sumprabum, capturing several junta bases, camps and command centers. By 8 May, they had captured 11 battalion headquarters throughout the state and captured Sumprabum Township.

Through the rest of May, the KIA captured Momauk after junta soldiers retreated, attacked a bridge at the entrance of the state capital Myitkyina. and made gains in Mansi and Tanai The KIA took an additional dozen junta bases in Waingmaw Township starting in 20 May, securing their positions.

==== Continued Rakhine offensive ====
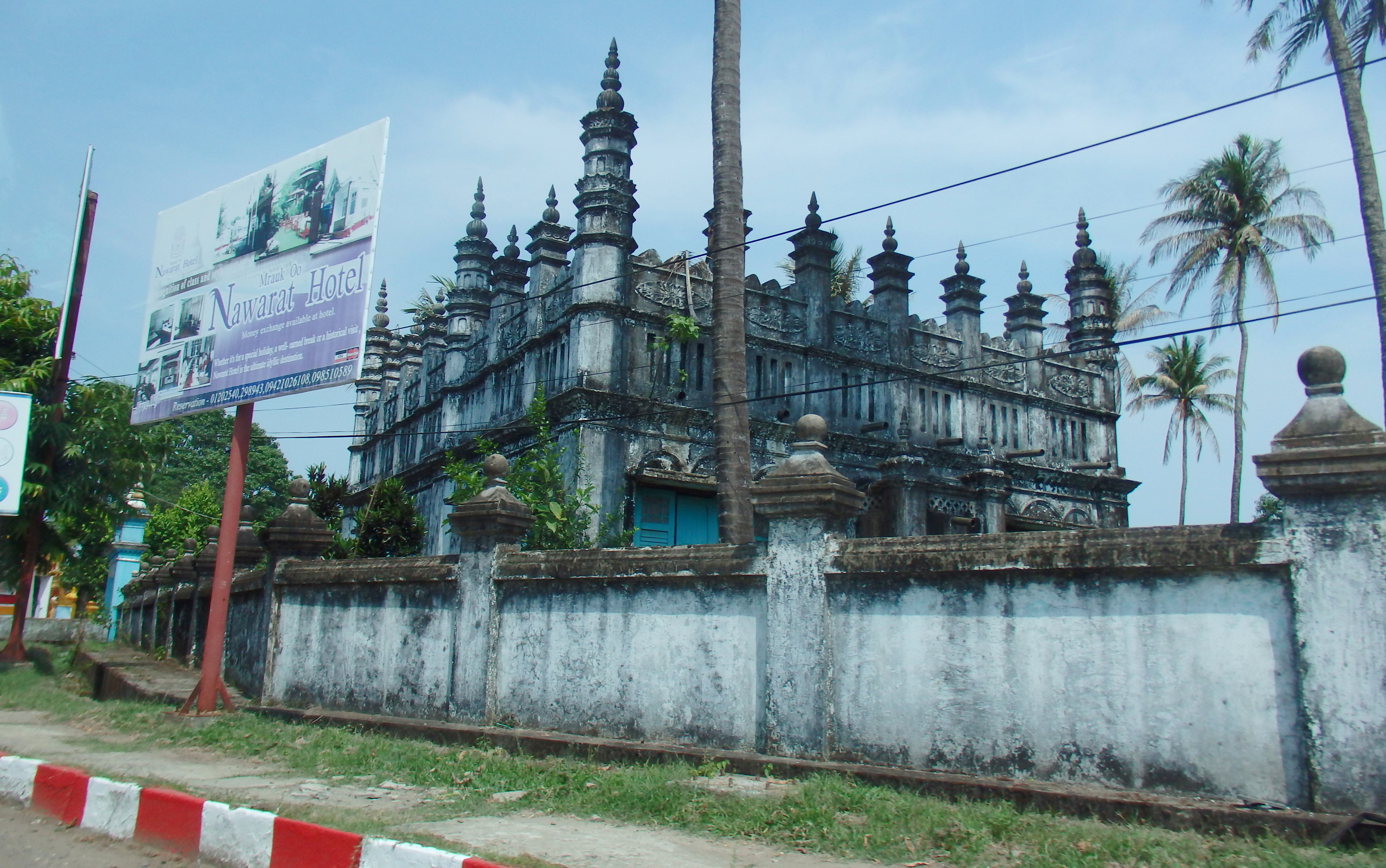
Mosque in Buthidaung, 2015

At the same time, the Rakhine offensive continued through March. On 5 March, the Arakan Army captured Ponnagyun and threatened the regional capital Sittwe, only 33 kilometres away. On 17 March, continued Arakan Army assaults took Rathedaung and its township, cutting off Sittwe from the rest of Rakhine by land.

On 12 March, after an 85-day battle, the Arakan Army captured the town of Ramree, taking all of Ramree Island except for the deep sea port city of Kyaukphyu under the Arakan Army's control.

On 24 March, the Arakan Army began an offensive in central Rakhine concurrently with their offensive on Sittwe, launching attacks on the junta's regional headquarters in Ann. North of Ann, the Arakan Army launched attacks on neighbouring Ngape Township in Magway Region. Ann's location is strategically important as the link between Rakhine and Magway via the Minbu-Ann road through the Arakan Mountains and as a gateway preventing AA from attacking southern Rakhine State. Through April, the Arakan Army cut off Ann from neighboring Padein by capturing parts of the Ann-Minbu Highway and captured bases in the hilltops of Ann township.

Northern Rakhine offensives saw little territory change until 3 May when the Arakan Army captured the headquarters of the Border Guard Police in Maungdaw Township at Kyee Kan Pyin, forcing at least 128 junta soldiers to cross the border into Bangladesh. Buthidaung and its surrounding township fell to the Arakha Army on 18 May. After its capture, Rohingya activists accused the Arakan Army of burning and targeting Rohingya homes in the town, a claim which the Arakan Army denied.

On 29 May, the junta and allied Arakan Liberation Army soldiers killed over 70 villagers in Byian Phyu near Sittwe due to suspected Arakan Army sympathies.

From late May to early June, the Arakan Army launched attacks on the remainder of Maungdaw Township. On 16 June, the AA urged the residents of Maungdaw to evacuate the town, warning of their imminent attack. In response, the Bangladesh Navy deployed warships to the disputed St. Martin's Island, which had been shot at several times by junta forces. On 4 July, the AA entered Maungdaw, attacking the last junta holdout in the town.

==== Capture of Papun and Myawaddy ====
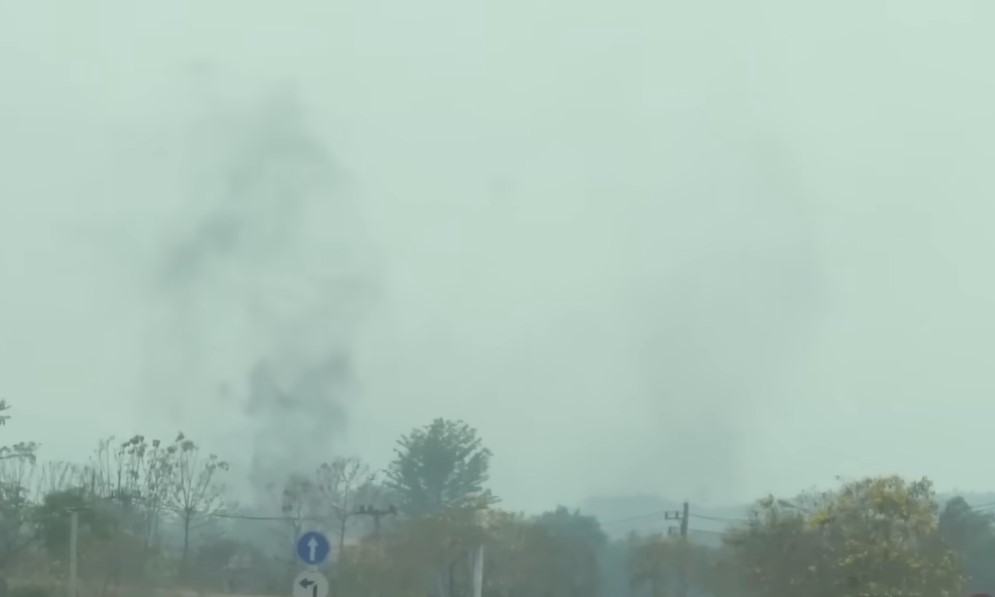
Smoke rising from Myawaddy, April 2024

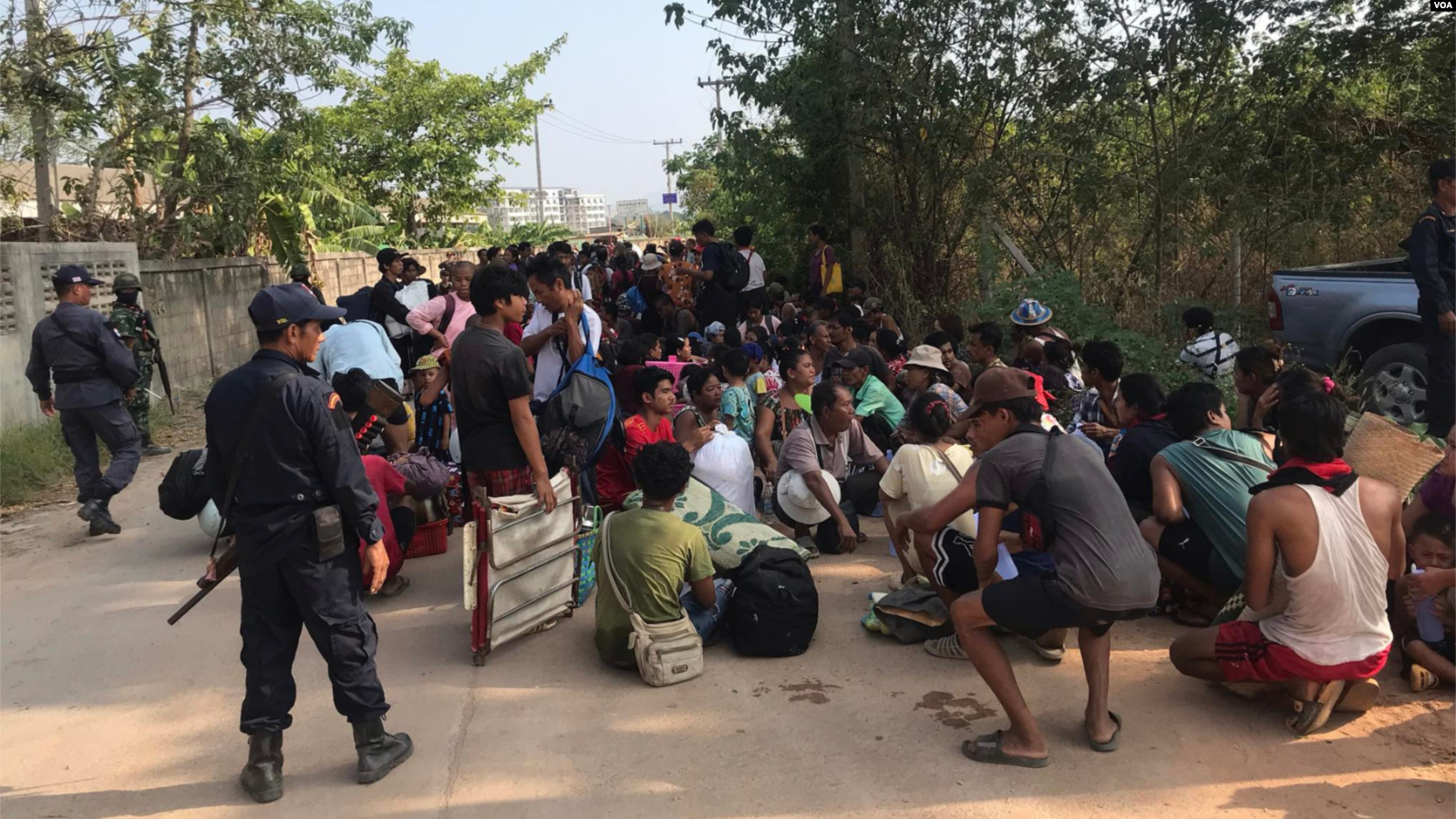
Civilians fleeing to Thailand during the siege of Myawaddy, 2024

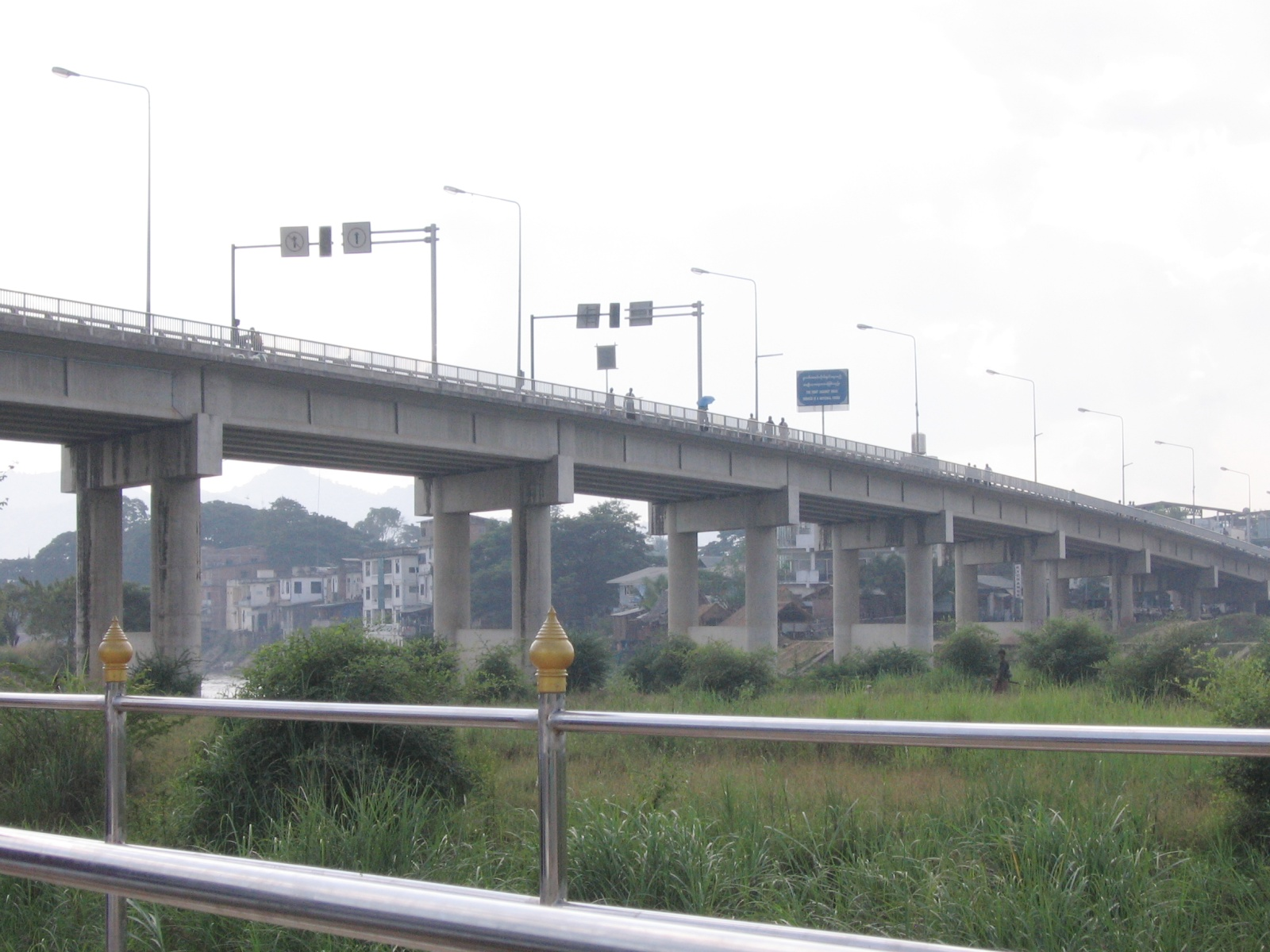
Thai-Myanmar friendship bridge from Mae Sot, Thailand

On 20 March, the Karen National Liberation Army and its PDF allies began to besiege the town of Papun, the capital of Hpapun District, Karen State. Eight days later, the town was captured, with fighting moving to the hills outside the town.

After a prolonged siege and several days of negotiations, on 5 April over 600 junta soldiers and their families in Myawaddy surrendered to the KNU and withdrew across the border to Mae Sot, leaving only the 275th Light Infantry Battalion (LIB) near the western entrance to defend the town. By 10 April, KNLA and PDF troops captured the LIB base with the 200 LIB soldiers withdrawing to the 2nd Thai-Myanmar Friendship Bridge on the border. This prompted Thailand to deploy the 3rd Army along the border. The junta sent reinforcements to retake the town, but they were stalled in Kyondoe. On 12 April, Thai officials and the KNU confirmed the capture of Myawaddy. The junta retaliated with airstrikes although locals reported no KNLA presence in the streets.

Despite the KNLA's major role in the battle, they ceded control of the town to the Karen National Army (KNA) to ensure security and reportedly due to the KNA's role in negotiations for the initial surrender.

On 19 April the KNLA attacked the remaining LIB 275th soldiers who were still holding out under the 2nd Thai-Myanmar Friendship Bridge. The junta responded with airstrikes, killing several civilians and forcing the KNLA to delay further attacks.

===== Continued battle for Myawaddy =====
After Myawaddy's capture, the junta launched Operation Aung Zeya, a counteroffensive to retake the town led by Light Infantry Division (LID) 55, numbering around 1,000 and reportedly led by the junta's second-in-command Soe Win. On 16 April, the LID 55 began attempting to cross the Dawna Range but was continually intercepted by the KNLA and allies, being forced to retreat and reportedly experiencing heavy losses.

Early in the counteroffensive KNLA forces withdrew from most of Kawkareik. On 21 April, a junta convoy was routed in Kawkareik Township, but junta forces successfully recaptured Kawkareik the next day despite losing vehicles to the KNLA.

On 23 April, the KNA helped the LIB 275th soldiers sheltering under the 2nd Friendship Bridge to retake their base west of Myawaddy. The following day, KNU spokesman stated that they would "temporarily withdraw" from Myawaddy, but vowed to continue guerrilla attacks along the AH1.

The stalled LID 55 advancement moving through the Dawna Range reached the Taw Naw waterfall by 29 April. However, the counteroffensive stalled again, without any major gains the following month. Residents reported that the KNA had helped "hundreds" of junta soldiers to reach Myawaddy through forested paths.

==== Mon and Karenni resistance ====
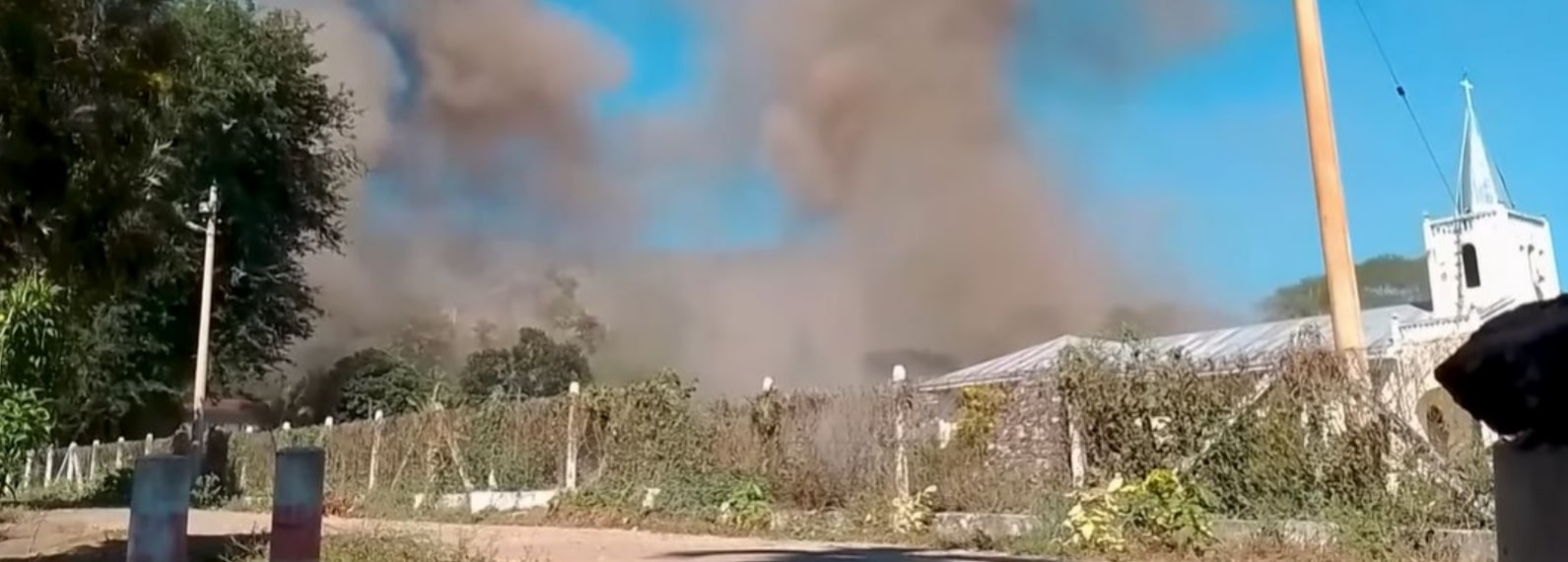
Myanmar Air Force bombs a church in Kayah State, May 2024

Karenni resistance continued with Operation 1111 aiming to capture Kayah State and its capital Loikaw. In January, they captured Pekon in neighboring Shan State. In February, they captured Shadaw after a month-long battle. By 23 March, the Karenni announced that they had captured 65 junta positions, controlled six out of nine towns in Kayah (Note: Mese (captured in June 2023), Demoso, Ywarthit, Shadaw, Mawchi, Nan Mae Khon.) and were in control of nearly 90% of Kayah State.

On 20 January 2024, local resistance forces in Ye Township, Mon State intensified attacks, announcing their intent to capture Ye. On 14 February, the New Mon State Party (Anti-Military Dictatorship) (MNLA-AMD) split from the non-combatant Mon National Liberation Army and effectively declared war on the junta. Around 22 March, Mon State resistance groups began vehicle inspections near Kaleinaung, prompting the junta close roads. MNLA-AMD and allies, would then capture the Kawt Bein Police Station in Kawkareik Township, Karen State. In response, junta forces shelled Kawt Bein and eventually recaptured the area after a battle on 25 April.

On 8 April, Mon PDF forces launched drone attacks on the Southeastern Command headquarters in Mawlamyine while junta deputy commander-in-chief Soe Win was present.

On 29 May, junta forces launched an offensive to recapture Loikaw from Karenni resistance. Junta columns reached the Loikaw-Mobye-Hsi Hseng intersection by 3 June before stalling. On 25 June, Karenni resistance captured Maesalawng Hill, near Bawlakhe, after a six day offensive.

===== Junta counteroffensives in Southern Myanmar =====
From 8 May to 20 May, junta forces also conducted an offensive throughout Thayetchaung Township, the longest of such offensives in Tanintharyi Region since the 2021 coup. The offensive displaced 5,000 civilians from 8 villages.

In late May, junta forces captured Pedak outpost on the road between Dawei and Myeik. In early June, around 600 junta soldiers were sent to recapture areas of the Ye - Dawei highway from Karen, Mon, and PDF forces who had captured the highway in March, The junta used heavy artillery and the resistance warned civilians to avoid the road, accusing the junta of using human shields and reinforcements disguised as civilians. On 1 July, junta forces launched an offensive on the Zardi Village Tract of Yebyu Township, attempting to recapture areas surrounding the Dawei Special Economic Zone.

=== Second phase of Operation 1027 and renewed rebel advances (June 2024–August 2024) ===
Map of anti-junta gains made during Operation 1027 as of September 2024

In June 2024, the Three Brotherhood Alliance's Haigeng ceasefire with the junta broke down seeing junta battalions destroyed and multiple towns in Shan state and beyond fall to the resistance, culminating in the capture of the Northern Shan State capital and headquarters of the Northeast Command, Lashio, in August 2024. Outside Shan State, the Myanmar military faced significant losses in Rakhine State where the Arakan Army gained almost full control by August 2024. In Mandalay, the Brotherhood Alliance and other armed groups escalated attacks, getting close to Mandalay. Despite these setbacks, the military continued efforts to reassert control, including forming new militias and intensifying conscription across the country. Although 1027 began in Shan State, widespread escalation dramatically shifted the balance of power, leading to EAOs in other areas making dominant gains and crippling the military junta with personnel attrition and historic levels of defections.

==== Operation 1027 (Phase 2) ====
While it took until June for the Haigeng ceasefire to fully break down, tensions began as early as March. The ceasefire was formalised on 1 March at a meeting in Kunming, with the junta reportedly agreeing to recognise the MNDAA's authority over Kokang. But as early as 26 March, junta forces attempted to invade MNDAA territory near Lashio but was repelled militarily. In response, the Chinese ambassador to Myanmar met with the junta foreign minister to discuss ending the clashes.

Tensions began to grow again in Northern Shan State on 9 June after the junta launched airstrikes on TNLA positions in Mongmit Township. TNLA would accuse the junta of violating the ceasefire. Through mid-June, junta forces amassed near 3BA-territories and destroyed roads in the area

On 23 June, the junta clashed with Myanmar National Democratic Alliance Army (MNDAA) near Lashio. and with the TNLA around Kyaukme, Nawnghkio Township, and Mogok Township on 24 June. On 25 June, the TNLA announced that it had restarted Operation 1027 in Northern Shan State, and encircled Kyaukme.

On 26 June, most of Nawnghkio was captured by PDF and TNLA forces. By 28 June, the TNLA had captured most of the district capital town Kyaukme and continued attacking the junta bases around the town.

==== Southern Rakhine offensives ====
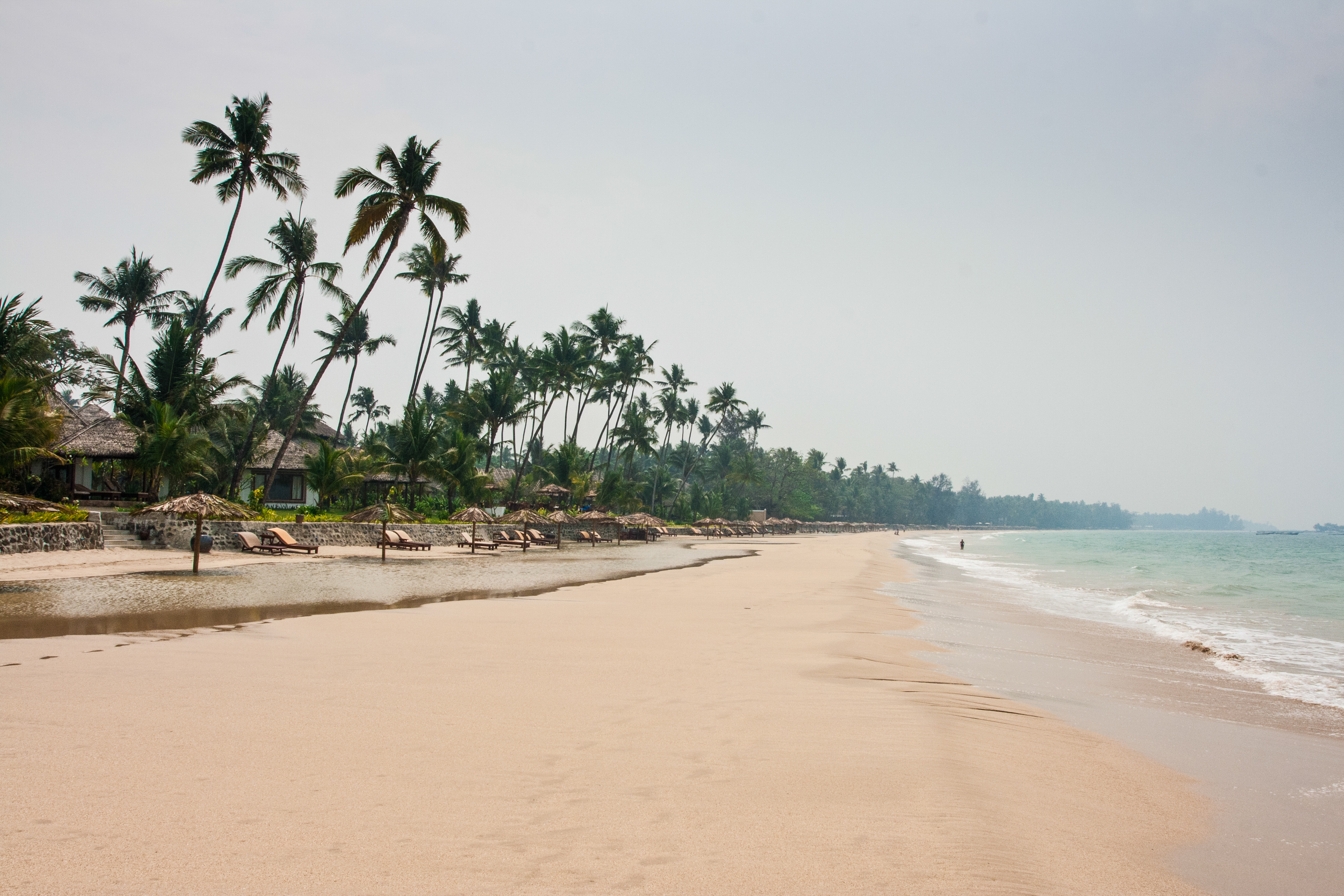
Ngapali Beach, just outside Thandwe

Concurrently in early June, the Arakan Army made significant gains in southern Rakhine state. On 2 June, clashes erupted on the Thandwe-Taungup highway and near the resort beach of Ngapali, Thandwe Township, trapping resort goers. Over the next week, the fighting moved closer to Thandwe, forcing the Thandwe Airport to close.

On 15 June, the Arakan Army clashed with junta forces near neighbouring Taungup and on the Taungup-Pandaung road. After months of relative peace in the area, heavy clashes broke out outside of Kyaukphyu on 17 June as junta forces left Danyawaddy naval base.

On 23 June, AA forces captured Thandwe Airport, the first airport to be captured by resistance forces since the 2021 coup. The airport's capture was not confirmed for another week, with AA claiming that 400 junta soldiers had died in the battle. The AA began attacking the beach itself on 26 June. On 17 July, AA forces captured Thandwe itself after three weeks of fighting.

==== Continued Chin offensive and infighting ====
Various Chin actors continued the war against the junta in early 2024, with resistance efforts picking up in May. However, in June, the Chin resistance began to engage in conflict with each other as infighting increased in June. Signs of infighting began as early as January when CDFs and CNA clashed with the Maraland Defence Force (MDF), a CBA member. The infighting in Chin State became broadly split along those aligned with the Chin Brotherhood Alliance (CBA) and the Chinland Council, which is dominated by the Chin National Army (CNA). Local Chinland Defense Forces (CDFs) are generally aligned with the CBA, though some like the CDF-Mara are aligned with the CNA.

On 2 May 2024, CBA aligned groups captured the strategic town of Kyindwe, Kanpetlet Township with the aid of the Arakan Army during the conclusion of the four-month long Battle of Kyindwe. The CC would then attempt to take Tonzang from the junta and its ally the Zomi Revolutionary Army capturing the town and neighbouring Cikha by 21 May.

The following week, the CBA moved on neighbouring Tedim, By mid-June, the junta pushing back from Tedim, recaptured positions along the Tedim-Kalay road and took back Kennedy Peak. Junta forces pushed as far as to recapture the strategic Tainngen village before losing both Kennedy Peak and Taingen to Chinland Council-led counteroffensives and retreating to Khaing Kham by 27 June. On 27 July, the CNA and ZRA met in Aizawl for peace negotiations.

On 30 May, CDF-Matupi captured the district administrative office on the Matupi-Hakha road in Matupi Township. On 24 June, CDFs clashed with junta forces outside of the Chin State capital Hakha. The junta retaliated by setting fires to homes in the town. On 20 July, as part of "Operation Rung", the CDF-Hakha captured the Hakha Main Police Station, releasing 62 detainees.

===== Operation Chin Brotherhood =====
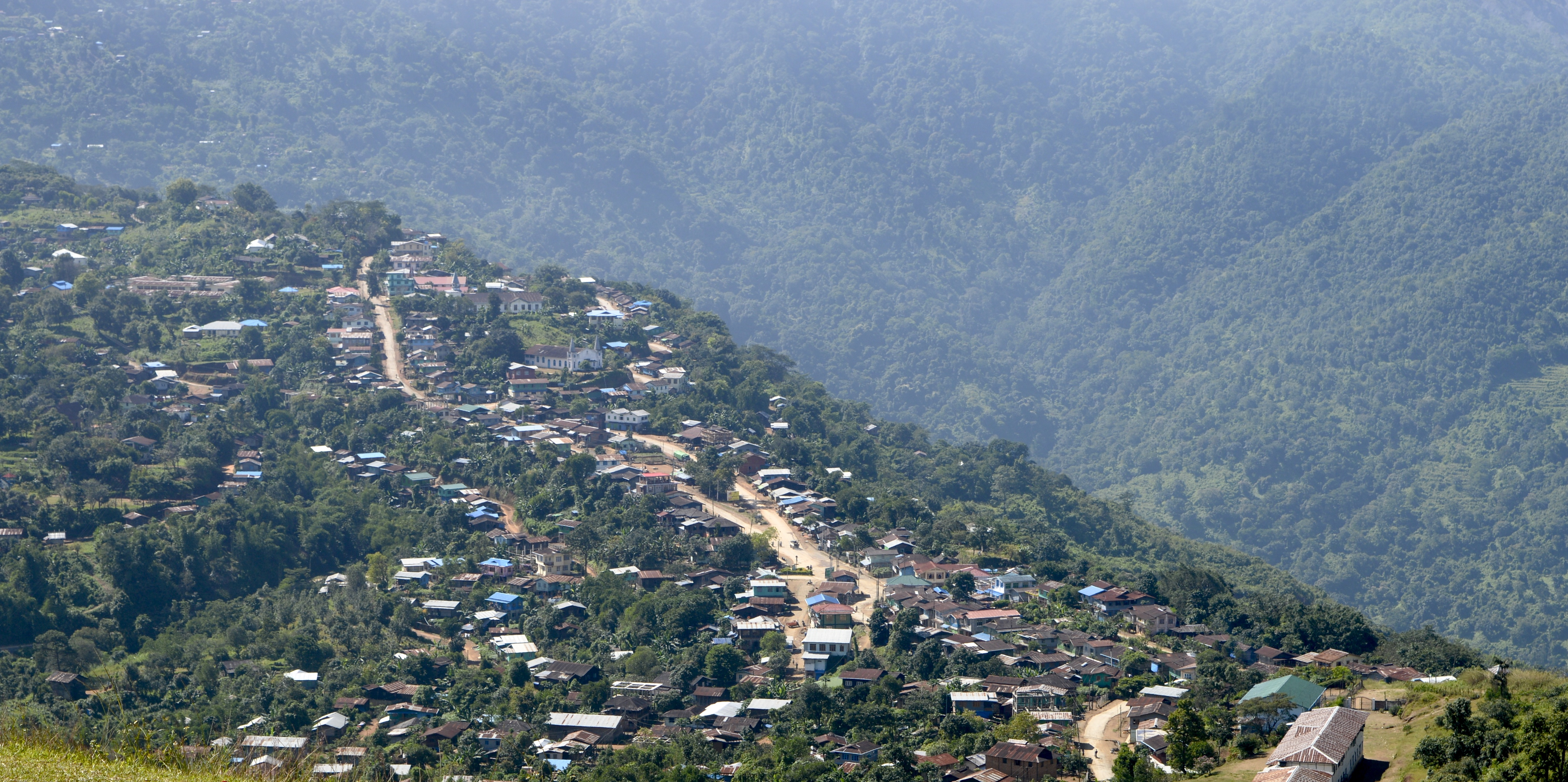
Matupi town, captured by Operation Chin Brotherhood on 29 June 2024

On 9 June, the CBA, Arakan Army and Magway-based Yaw Army began "Operation Chin Brotherhood" attacking Matupi. Shortly after the announcement, the Chinland Council issued a statement asking the Arakan Army to refrain from military and administrative operations in Chinland. This came days after Global Khumi Organisation urged the Arakha Army against committing human rights violations against the Khumi Chin people of Paletwa Township.

Operation Chin Brotherhood continued with CBA aligned forces capturing one of the two junta battalion bases outside Matupi on 17 June. Clashes between the CBA and CNA broke out during the push towards the final base, leading to 2 CBA deaths. The CNA/Chinland Council was forced to retreat from the Matupi area by 24 June On 29 June, the CBA captured the remaining junta base near Matupi and took over the town.

Infighting continued with CNA detaining other Yaw Defense Force soldiers and MDF and AA taking Lailenpi, Matupi Township from the CDF-Mara and CNA.

==== Kachin theater ====
On 4 June renewed clashes broke out outside of Momeik. A week later, KIA forces captured the Waingmaw-Sadung-Kanpaikti road, cutting off the state capital Myitkyina from the border.

On 15 July, junta forces launched an offensive to recapture areas near Momauk. A month later, on 19 August, KIA forces captured the last junta base in Momauk, completing their capture of the township. Shortly after, junta forces launched another counteroffensive to retake the town, but were stalled at Aung Myay village.

==== Karenni fighting ====
On 1 July, junta forces began attacking KNDF positions south of Pinlaung, attempting to relieve the Karenni siege on Pekon.

In early July, fighting further intensified in Loikaw as Karenni resistance attempted to recapture areas of the town they had earlier been forced to withdraw from. The Irrawaddy reported on 8 July that fighting is intensifying after reinforcements of 500 troops had arrived to help the already stationed 1,500 Tatmadaw troops.

By mid July in Hpasawng Township, there has been reports of fresh intense fighting, incl. Karenni claims of poisoned gas use by Tatmadaw against the resistance fighters. Meanwhile, in Loikaw, pro-Tatmadaw sources confirm fighting in Loikaw, Pekhon and Mobye. In addition it claims Tatmadaw progressed in the direction of Loikaw University.

==== Battle of Lashio ====
Map showing the Battle of Lashio during July–August 2024

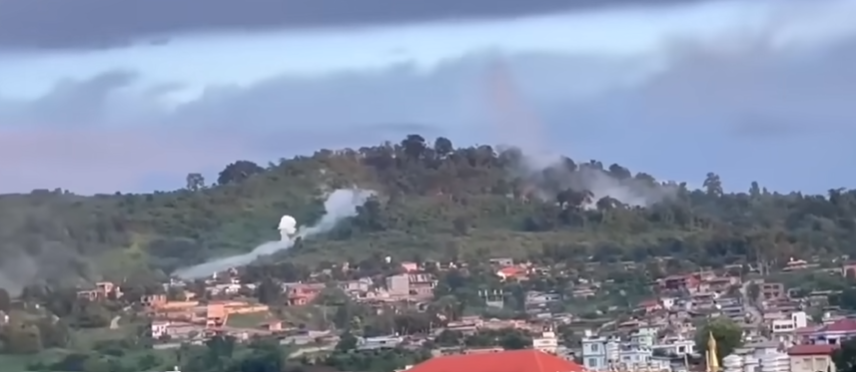
Smoke rising from Lashio after the bombing, July 2024

On 2 July, the MNDAA began the Battle of Lashio against the heavily defended capital and largest town of northern Shan State. The TNLA joined the offensive the next day with the 2 armies attacking 4 junta bases surrounding Lashio. Pro-junta Telegram channels accused the Shan State Progress Party (SSPP) of joining the offensive. On 5 July, TNLA forces entered Lashio proper from the south. The next day, the MNDAA captured Nampawng village south of Lashio, encircling the town, and began launching attacks into Lashio.

Concurrently MNDAA forces clashed with junta forces in Mongyai Township and TNLA began launching attacks into Momeik.

Tensions and disputes rose between TNLA and the Shan State Army (SSPP), with both sides asking the United Wa State Army (UWSA) for mediation. On 10 July, the TNLA attacked junta positions near Tangyan. Following an agreement with the Tatmadaw, the neutral UWSA deployed thousands of soldiers around Tangyan to prevent clashes from spreading to the area. On 13 July, SSPP forces occupied Mongyai, with residents claiming that clashes might break out in the town due to the apparent SSPP-junta agreement.

On 25 July, in a "historic victory", the MNDAA claimed to have captured the Northeastern Command headquarters of Lashio, the first regional command headquarters to ever be captured by resistance forces. On 30 July, MNDAA forces ambushed junta reinforcements attempting to reach Lashio, inflicting heavy casualties. On 3 August, the capture of Lashio and the Northeastern Command headquarters was confirmed, with hundreds of Burmese soldiers surrendering. The Northeastern Command had exiled their leadership to Muse, which remained the last junta stronghold in the area due to its proximity with the Chinese border.

==== Ceasefire attempts and "Shan-Man" ====
On 14 July, the MNDAA instituted a tenuous 4-day ceasefire after meeting with the Chinese Communist Party. Despite the ceasefire, clashes continued. TNLA and SSPP leaders also met in Panghsang, Wa State, to discuss an end to the clashes. On 16 July, TNLA captured most of Mongmit and began launching attacks on the junta headquarters south of the town.

At the same time as the renewed 1027 offensive, the NUG announced that it had joined in the offensive through its People's Defense Forces in Mandalay Region, calling the attacks a "Shan Man" operation. As part of Operation Shan-Man, the Mandalay People's Defence Force (MDY-PDF) captured 36 junta positions in late June and early July throughout the northern Mandalay Region. The MDY-PDF and TNLA also captured Nawnghkio on 10 July and Singu Township by 12 July, further cutting off junta forces in Northern Shan State.

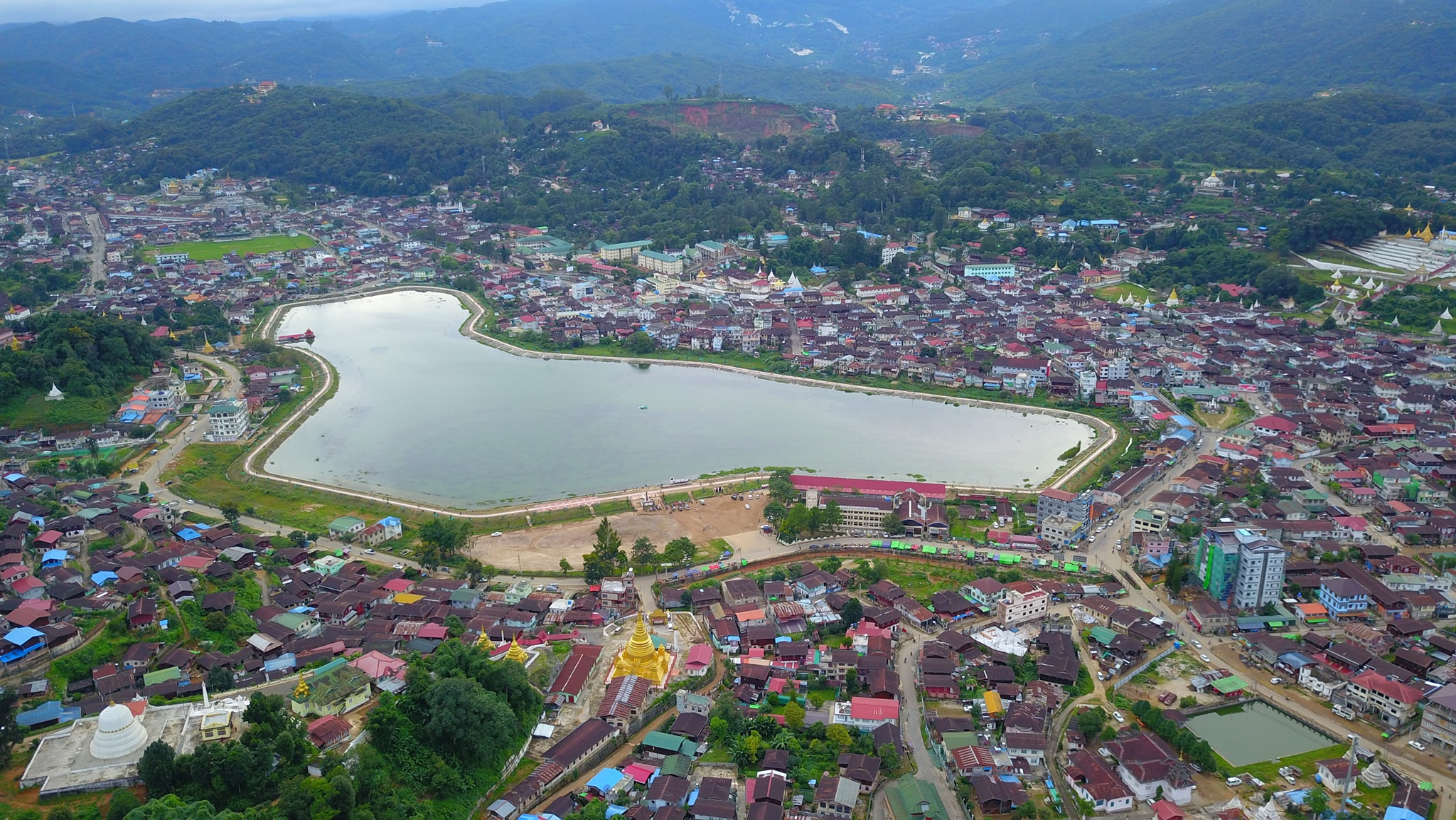
Mogok, Mandalay Region

On 20 July, the 3BA, reportedly under pressure from China, agreed to extend the ceasefire to 31 July. Despite the agreements, junta reinforcements launched renewed attacks on Kyaukme on the same day. On 24 July, TNLA and PDF forces completely captured Mogok, Mandalay Region.

The TNLA captured the Shan state towns of Momeik on 31 July and Kyaukme on 6 August. On 10 August, TNLA forces launched an offensive against Hsipaw, capturing the town's prison and then nearby Nawngkawgyi village by 13 August.

On 12 August, MDY-PDF captured Tagaung, the first historical capital of the Burmese monarchy, after a one-day battle. The following week, Mandalay-PDF captured Thabeikkyin, capturing the town and its surroundings. The entirety of Thabeikkyin District came under rebel control.

=== Stalemates, Chinese pressure, and western front escalations (August 2024 – March 2025) ===
After the fall of Lashio, the junta launched counter offensives, but facing an inability to make progress, changed its tactics to favour aerial bombardment to destroy towns they could not take, like Lashio. The rebels, too, have failed to make as much progress due to diplomatic pressures and supply issues. Analyst Yun Sun from the Stimson Center noted Director of the Office of the Central Foreign Affairs Commission Wang Yi's visit in mid-August as indicative of a shift in China's stance from greenlighting Operation 1027 in November 2023 to endorsing the State Administration Council and criticising the Northern Alliance and the United Wa State Army (UWSA) for not standing down. There are signs that China is accelerating weapons transfers to the junta and restricting key ammunition supplies to the TNLA, affecting the resistance's realistic prospects of taking Mandalay despite the junta being in its weakest position since 2021. However, this recent alignment with the military regime has strained its influence over border groups like the 3BA, diminishing China's sway and ability to mediate in this new landscape. China's support temporarily slowed the rebels' momentum but failed to reverse the trend of humiliating losses, including the fall of a second Regional Military Command in Ann, Rakhine State. Instead, China finds its interests threatened as the Arakan Army surround Kyaukphyu and Kachin groups seize control of rare earth mineral mines. Chinese-backed peace talks and pressure for MNDAA to retreat from Lashio continued in early 2025 but failed in late March 2025.

In January 2025, The New York Times reported that the rebels were opening colleges and universities in the territory they controlled.

==== Operation Hsinphyushin ====
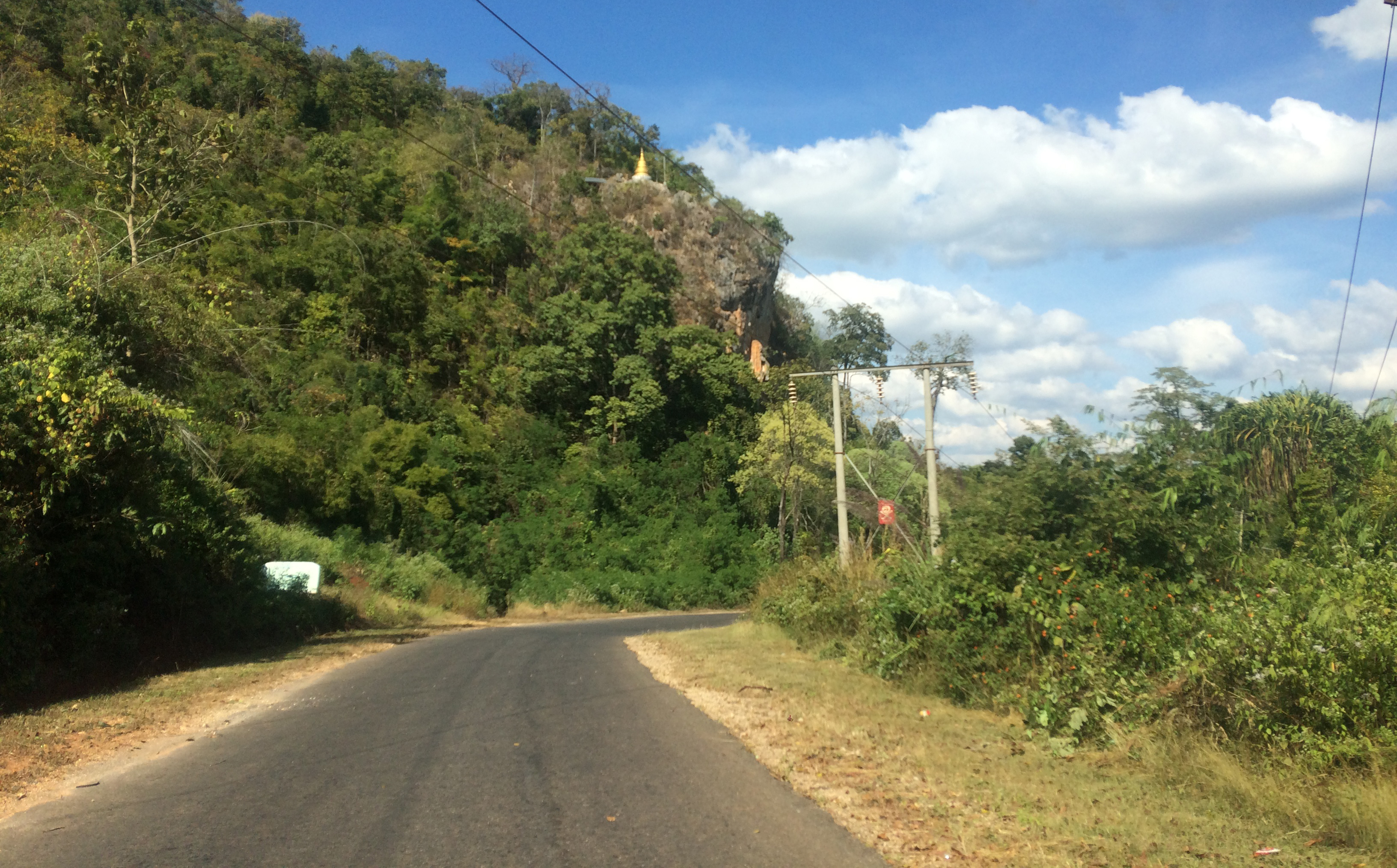
Street in Nawnghkio

In late August 2024, the Tatmadaw began preparing an offensive to recapture key towns in northern Shan State, terming it as "Operation Hsin Phyu Shin" (after the Burmese king Hsinbyushin). Throughout September and October, the Tatmadaw began massing forces in the final towns it controlled in Northern Shan State (Namlan, Mongyai, and Tangyan) in preparation for the counteroffensive to retake Lashio.

This came in the context of strained China-3BA relations. On 29 August, the Ruili City Security Commission issued a statement demanding the TNLA to end all offensive operations against the junta, threatening "more deterrent and disciplinary measures" if it did not. 4 days later, the junta designated the Three Brotherhood Alliance and its members as "terrorist groups". On 19 September, the MNDAA announced that it would end its offensive operations, further stating it would refuse to ever work with the National Unity Government of Myanmar. Despite the Chinese threat, the TNLA captured the last junta base in Hsipaw on 13 October.

On 19 October, Tatmadaw forces launched a counteroffensive, aimed at retaking Nawnghkio instead of Lashio.

On 18 November, it was confirmed that MNDAA leader Peng Daxun had been detained in Yunnan by Chinese authorities since late October, further pressuring MNDAA forces to relinquish Lashio to the junta.

In early December, the MNDAA declared a unilateral ceasefire and expressed willingness to engage in peace talks with the junta, with China acting as a mediator. The MNDAA announced its readiness to send a high-level delegation for dialogue to resolve conflicts through political means. However, despite this announcement, airstrikes on TNLA-held areas continued. On 20 January 2025, the MNDAA and the junta agreed to a Chinese-brokered ceasefire, with several sources claiming that a withdraw of the former from Lashio was a condition for the deal. However, at the time neither the junta nor the MNDAA revealed any details of the deal. The pressure for MNDAA to retreat from Lashio continued but ceasefire talks failed in late March 2025.

==== Renewed southern Shan assault ====
In early August, the PNLA launched a renewed assault on the outskirts of Hsi Hseng after junta forces in the town bombed the PNLA headquarters in Mawkmai Township. At the same time, the junta-allied PNO intensified military preparations by training 10,000 militia members in Pinlaung Township, in southern Shan State, aimed at bolstering the defense of Naypyitaw. On 10 September, the PNLO split after disputes surrounding a ceasefire with the junta, with pro-ceasefire leaders breaking off to form the "PNLO-NCA-S."

On 19 September, the Tatmadaw and allied Lahu military attacked a Shan State Army (RCSS) base in Yanghkam, Mong Ping Township.

==== Continued attacks in the Dry Zone ====
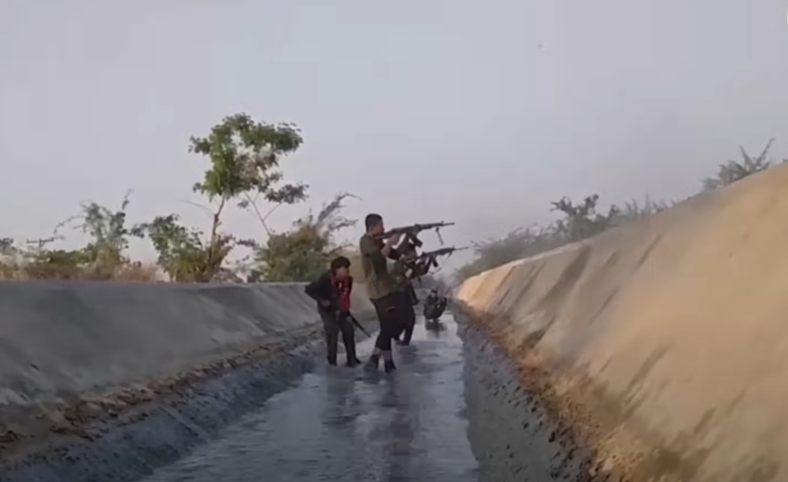
PDF forces in Magway Region, August 2024

The People's Defence Forces also continued fighting outside of the Shan-Man context. On 11 June, the Union Liberation Front and Sagaing Region People's Defence Organisation captured a junta base near the Sagaing capital Monywa. On 27 June, a coalition of several PDFs attacked Budalin.

On 17 July, People's Defense Forces launched 2 rockets at Nay Pyi Taw International Airport, causing no casualties.

On 10 August, PDFs in Myingyan District, central Mandalay Region, launched an offensive against Taungtha and Natogyi. Natogyi was briefly captured before being recaptured by the junta soon after. On 15 August, PDF launched an offensive on Tabayin, Sagaing Region, again capturing the town by 18 August briefly before withdrawing shortly after due to junta counterattacks. In mid-August, the KIA and PDF launched joint offensives on Indaw, Pinlebu, and Htigyaing, Sagain Region. Resistance forces captured Pinlebu on 8 October, defeating almost 800 junta soldiers.

On 11 November, the Burma National Revolutionary Army and several other PDF's launched attacks on Pale before being forced to retreat due to junta counterattacks.

==== Late 2024 Kachin offensives ====
On 7 September, KIA forces began attacking Singtawn—outside Hpakant—after junta forces raided a hotel in the area, capturing the village one month later. In late September, it was reported that junta forces were preparing an offensive to retake Sumprabum and Tiyangzug.

On 29 September, the KIA launched an offensive on Chipwi and Hsawlaw, capturing both towns by 2 October. Shortly after, the KIA asked the New Democratic Army – Kachinto defect, but were denied. In response, the KIA launched an offensive on Kachin BGF battalions 1002 and 1003, capturing both by 22 October.

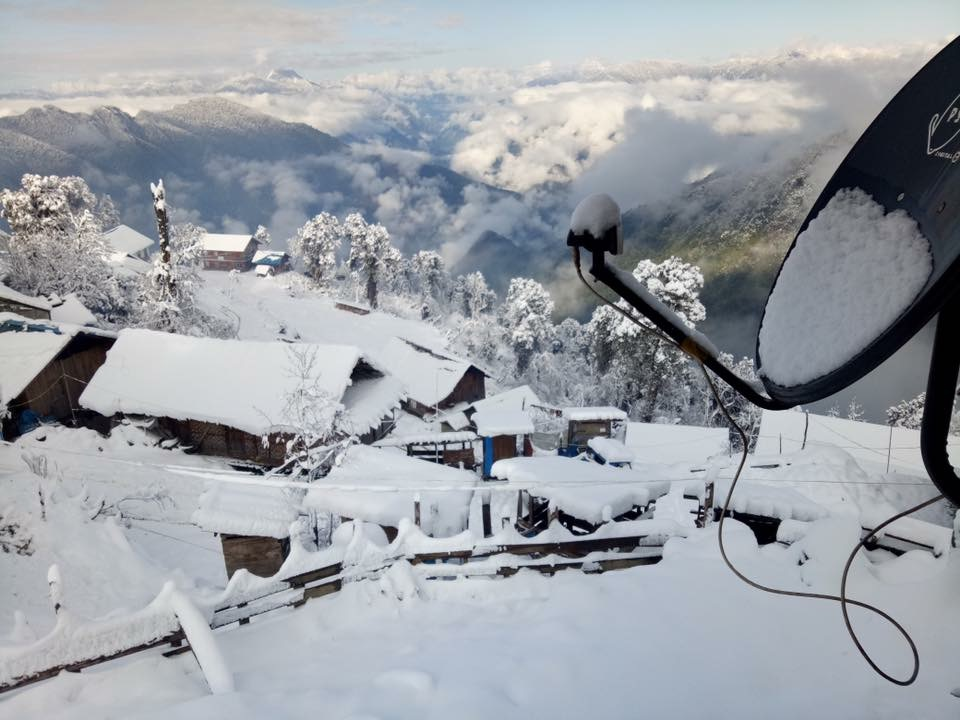
Pang War, Myanmar on a snowy day

The KIA then captured the NDA-K's headquarters in the town of Pang War on 20 October with Kachin BGF leader Zahkung Ting Ying fled to China. On 1 November, the KIA launched an attack on the final BGF 1001 bases at Nuzaungbaung and Phimaw, capturing both by the next day. Border Guard Forces fled to Kangfang (Ganfai), which the KIA captured days later. On 10 November, KIA forces completed the capture of Kachin Special Region 1 and all of the Kachin BGF territory when they took Lanse village. On 20 November, despite Chinese pressure, the KIA captured Kanpaikti, the final Kachin BGF base. This victory rendered the NDA-K virtually defeated on all fronts, with most members either deserting or surrendering to the KIA. Some BGF members joined pro-government militias later in the conflict. All assets of the NDA-K were confiscated by the KIA, giving the rebel group a major boost in revenue. By capturing more of the China-Myanmar border, the KIA could continue selling jade in larger quantities, giving licenses to private Chinese mining companies to operate on their territory.

In December, the KIA and allies attacked Myanmar junta targets in Bhamo and Mansi townships in the Battle of Bhamo.

==== Chin theatre ====
In early August, the Chin National Army and allies took in Thantlang after about a week of fighting.

On 9 November, the Chin Brotherhood Alliance relaunched Operation Chin Brotherhood, launching simultaneous offensives on Falam and Mindat, capturing most of the former.

In December 2024, the Chin Brotherhood Alliance (CBA) achieved significant victories in Chin State. On 15 December 123 junta troops and police officers from Mindat district and township police compounds, together with their families, surrendered to the CBA. On 21 December, the CBA declared Mindat a junta-free zone following the rescue of 13 political prisoners. These victories further consolidated the CBA's control in the region and demonstrated the strength of Operation Chin Brotherhood.

==== Advances in Rakhine and the fall of Ann ====
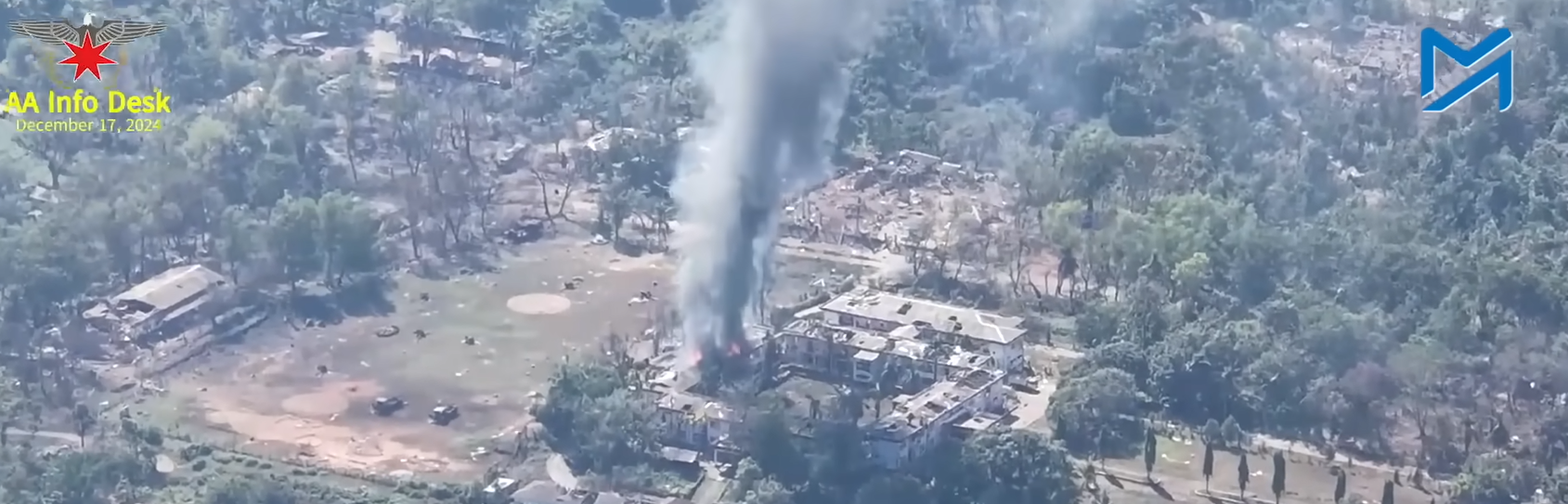
On 20 December 2024, the Arakan Army (AA) claimed to have captured the Myanmar military's Western Command headquarters in Ann, Rakhine State.

After the capture of Thandwe, Arakan Army forces launched an offensive south towards Gwa, capturing Kyeintali by 14 August 2024. On 5 September, the AA captured Maung Shwe Lay Naval Base, the first naval base to be captured by resistance forces. On 25 September, the AA launched an offensive on the remaining bases in Ann. By 25 October, the AA captured the remaining Mae Taung bases, encircled Ann, and captured the town's airport. On 7 November, the AA launched an offensive on neighboring Taungup. The Arakan Army captured Maungdaw in the first half of December, after securing the junta's last remaining position there. The AA captured General Thurein Tun during the operation.

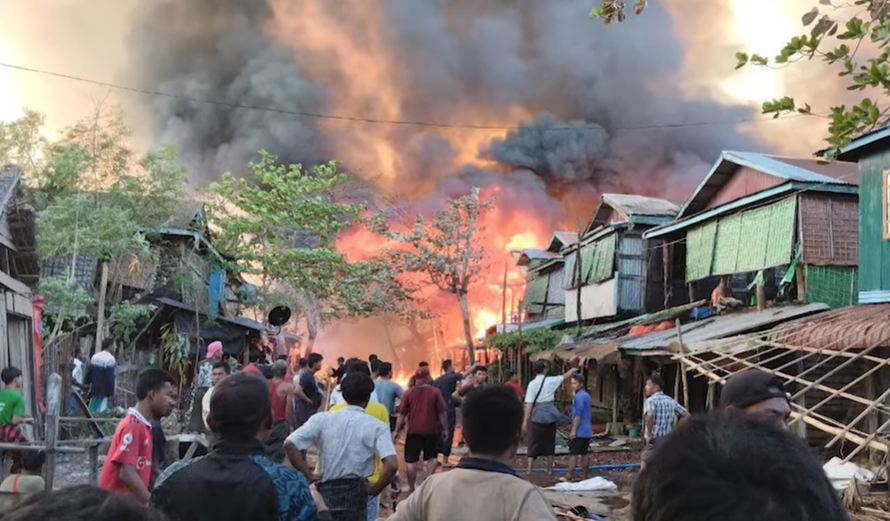
Kyauktaw Township bombed by Myanmar Air Force, January 2025

In December 2024, the AA achieved significant victories in Rakhine State. On 8 December, the AA captured Maungdaw Township, securing full control over the 271-kilometer border with Bangladesh. This strategic gain was followed by the seizure of the Western Regional Command headquarters in Ann Township on 20 December, marking the second regional command center to fall to ethnic armed groups within five months. On 29 December, the AA extended its campaign by seizing full control of Gwa Township, the southernmost town in Rakhine State, after junta troops retreated from the area. This victory further consolidated the AA's dominance in the region, leaving only a few townships under junta control. The AA's leadership has since expressed readiness to engage in political dialogue to seek a resolution to the ongoing conflict.

In January 2025, Arakan Army and joint PDF forces pushed into Shwethaungyan Subtownship, northwest Ayeyarwaddy Region taking the village of Magyizin. Battles with the junta intensified in the area as the Myanmar Navy increased bombardments to the Bawmi coastline area near Magyizin by 20 January 2025. By late March, AA had reached the eastern side of the Arakan mountains taking villages in Lemyethna Township near the Pathein-Monywa Highway.

==== Karen State clashes and key KNLA advances ====
After the Karen National Army set a five-month deadline in May 2024 for Chinese scamming operatives to leave Myawaddy, many have migrated to the Three Pagodas Pass, controlled by the Democratic Karen Benevolent Army. Throughout May, the KNLA, aided by allies, captured all but three of the remaining junta bases in Hpapun Township.

On 1 June, clashes erupted between KNLA-led forces and joint Karen National Army/junta forces near Tonetatdar. A source close to the junta claimed that Karen National Army (KNA) soldiers were coordinating to join with junta soldiers from Operation Aung Zeya to retake Myawaddy, Thingannyinaung and to attack the Asian Highway 1 (AH1). However, after being stalled for months by ambushes on the AH1, the Aung Zeya column was forced to retreat to Kawkareik.

On 9 August, KNLA forces clashed with junta reinforcements near Zayatkyi, Htantabin Township.

In December 2024, the KNLA achieved significant victories in Kayin State. On 17 December, the KNLA attacked the Swe Taw Kone junta camp near Lay Kay Kaw village, capturing prisoners and seizing weapons. Additionally, the KNLA recaptured its former headquarters, Manerplaw, on the Thai border, further consolidating its control in the region.

==== Shifting Karenni frontlines ====
In early August, the Tatmadaw and civilian sources reported that the Tatmadaw had secured Loikaw and much of the surrounding township. On 5 September, the KNDF attempted to assassinate Tatmadaw leader Min Aung Hlaing while he was visiting Loikaw.

As of 20 September 2024, the Myanmar junta only controlled Loikaw and Bawlakhe townships.

During October, fighting shifted to North Kayah State after the flooding of Typhoon Yagi. Tatmadaw troops and Pa-O militia attacked several Karenni resistance-held settlements, including Pinlaung, Mobye and Pekon. Pekon was taken in a military counter-offensive, taking advantage of the flooding caused by Yagi. However, Karenni leadership did not believe that the Tatmadaw aimed to hold the territory, as the Tatmadaw needed helicopters to maintain some supply lines. Fighting was reported in early December along the Pekon-Moebye-Loikaw road.

On 29 October 2024, several Karenni resistance groups were reported to have united as the Kayan National Army.

In January 2025, the town of Demoso was reported to have become a major centre for refugees, housing some 150,000 displaced civilians.

===== Fighting over Mobye =====
Tatmadaw has succeeded in taking Mobye, the town, during its offensive in December. Now as of early February the KNDF launches an advance to retake the town.

In early March, there were reports of air and artillery strikes in Pekhon and Loikaw. While KNDF had announced it had launched an offensive to retake Mobye from Tatmadaw, who had taken it in December. The junta was reported to have taken high casualties when taking the town. With KNDF now defending against a junta bid to "reclaim" Mobye from KNDF. The junta sent reinforcements from Loikaw to help in this effort. Additional areas are mentioned, with the Irrawaddy citing an KNDF member saying: "Fighting has also broken out in [Karenni’s] Loikaw, Hpasaung, and Bawlakhae townships over the past month, but Mobye has seen the heaviest clashes. The junta has suffered significant casualties while we have also lost some comrades". Mobye is strategically located 40 km from Loikaw.

=== Earthquake and aftermath (March 2025 – present) ===
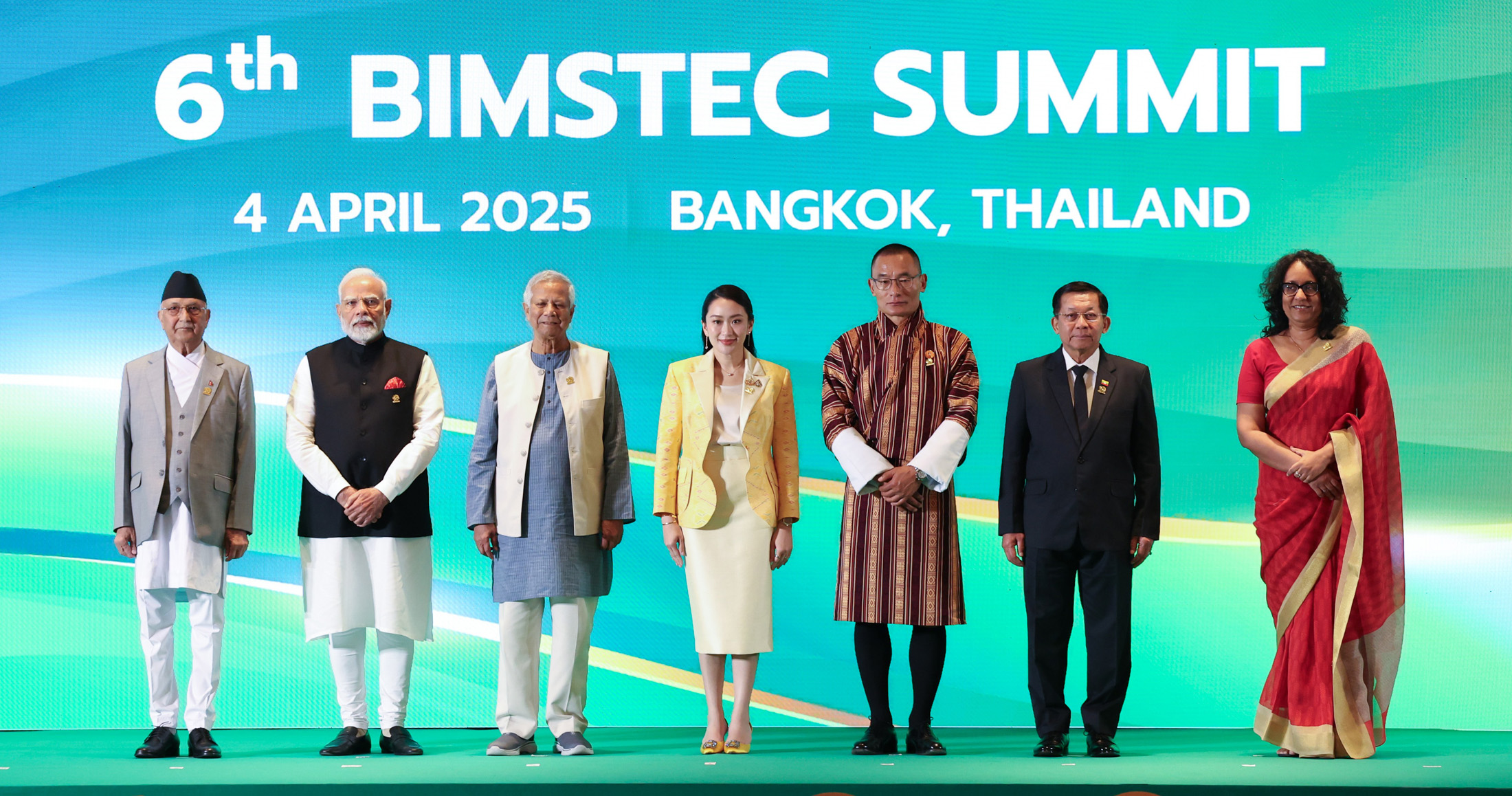
Junta leader Min Aung Hlaing gains international recognition after the earthquake at the BIMSTEC Summit

On 28 March 2025, a a M_{w} 7.9 earthquake occurred along the Sagaing Fault. Due to the earthquake, the nation's humanitarian crisis would worsen, and the focus of the civil war would be shifted. The resistance, junta, and EAOs all declared various unilateral ceasefires that were observed to varying degrees. The junta continued airstrikes on civilian targets under the guise of defending against the resistance. It used the chaos to position itself as the only actor capable of coordinating a disaster response, attempting to block aid efforts of the resistance to reinforce its authority. But this also gave the resistance a chance to show its state-building efforts to gain legitimacy as a governing body in resistance-held areas by organising aid and evacuation and highlighting the junta's attempts to block relief. Insurgent dynamics continued to evolve with Arakan Army expanding its influence through a loose network of allied resistance groups, projecting its power out of Rakhine State into neighbouring regions.

The earthquake also entangled the civil war with international actors as relief organisations navigated the complex situation on the ground. Far from being a moment of unity, the disaster allowed external actors to consolidate influence and the military to secure its symbolic authority rather than delivering relief equitably. Beyond aid, China orchestrated the MNDAA's handover of Lashio to the junta in part by exploiting the post-earthquake political vacuum to tighten its grip on Myanmar's borderlands. Analysts describe Beijing' involvement as part of a broader strategy to influence and create stability along its border through its leverage over both sides of the conflict. Meanwhile, offensives continued in areas unaffected by the earthquake or ceasefire declarations, like in Indaw and Karen State.

The Tatmadaw proceeded with long-delayed general elections across three phases in areas under their control through December 2025 and January 2026. Major opposition parties were barred from participating and regions affected by conflict were unable to vote. Analysts argued the vote was held to legitimise continued military rule rather than resolve the conflict. Observers noted that the Tatmadaw did little to reduce hostilities during the election, continuing airstrikes in regions holding voting and killing at least 170. Resistance groups also targeted individuals and places associated with the election. The election in Loikaw was reported to be restless, with forced voting and bombings.

==== Declared and broken ceasefires ====
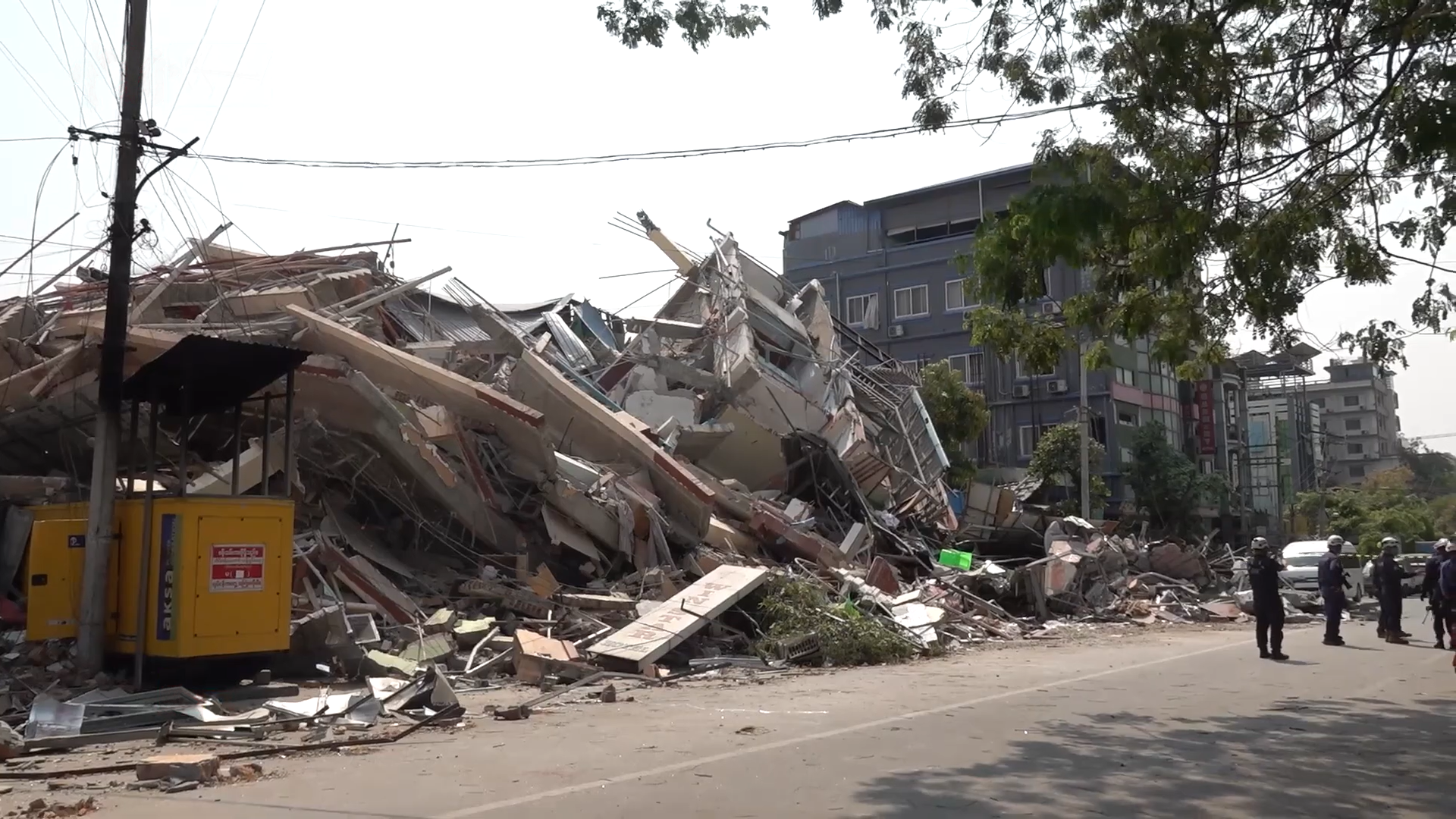
Damage in Mandalay from the 2025 Myanmar earthquake

After the earthquake, the NUG announced a two week unilateral pause in offensive actions to coordinate humanitarian efforts with the UN and non-governmental groups and provide access to resistance held areas.

The air base in Monywa continued operations against resistance-held Chaung-U Township, deploying a paradrop attack hours after the earthquake. The following day, the junta resumed aerial bombardment on territories held by resistance forces in Karen, northern Shan, Bago and Sagaing regions. The People's Defence Force, a rebel force, said they would observe a partial ceasefire for two weeks beginning on 30 March. Despite this, the junta conducted a bombing campaign in Pauk Township, Sagaing Region. An airstrike in Singu Township, Mandalay, on 31 March injured several residents and burnt down their homes.

On 1 April 2025, the Three Brotherhood Alliance announced a one-month unilateral humanitarian pause, refraining from offensive operations in conflict areas to facilitate post-earthquake rescue efforts. But junta leader Min Aung Hlaing announced on Myawaddy TV that he would continue military operations against rebels. The next day, the military fired warning shots at a Chinese Red Cross aid convoy. Later that day, Min Aung Hlaing announced that he would implement a 20-day ceasefire until 22 April. The KIA announced that it would similarly cease offensive operations later that day. The next day, the junta conducted an aerial bombing campaign in Indaw, Sagaing Region and continued firing artillery in Bhamo, Kachin State. By 7 April, joint ABSDF and PDF forces had captured Indaw completely.

On 1 May, The Three Brotherhood Alliance again announced a ceasefire, extending it to 31 May for the extended support of post-earthquake recovery. Despite ceasefires, fighting in Nawnghkio Township continued, with the TNLA losing eight outposts to the junta. The junta also continued bombings to push a counteroffensive to retake Madaya Township in Mandalay Region.

On 12 May, the junta launched airstrikes on a village school in Depayin, killing around 50, mostly children, despite the declared ceasefire.

==== Junta counteroffensives in Mandalay and Shan ====
In July, the junta successfully pushed back against the TNLA and allied PDF forces, recapturing Nawnghkio in northeast Shan State on 15 July. A junta flotilla aided troops to land in Thabeikkyin in northern Mandalay Region, capturing the town on 23 July. As part of this amphibious operation, the junta also ramped up airstrikes in southern Sagain to protect the flotilla. However, the flotilla was ambushed further upstream after Thabeikkyin north of Shwegu by PDF forces, preventing it from aiding in the continuing Battle of Bhamo. As of November 2025, the battle is still ongoing. As of 30th November, Tatmadaw has begun an counter-offensive to retake all of the city.

===== Withdrawal from Lashio =====
On 18 April, junta administrators and the Myanmar Police Force re-entered Lashio as part of a deal with the MNDAA. Reportedly, the junta will control the city; the MNDAA retains administration over Lashio's outskirts. Over the following two days, a convoy of vehicles flying the Chinese flag, whose occupants identified themselves as members of the Ceasefire Monitoring Group, drove into Lashio from China. On 21 April, the MNDAA lowered its flags in Lashio but its police officers and administrators functioned as before. The MNDAA then retreated to checkpoints five miles north and three miles south, continuing to surround the city and control portions of Lashio's outer wards.

===== Tatmadaw's defeat of TNLA =====
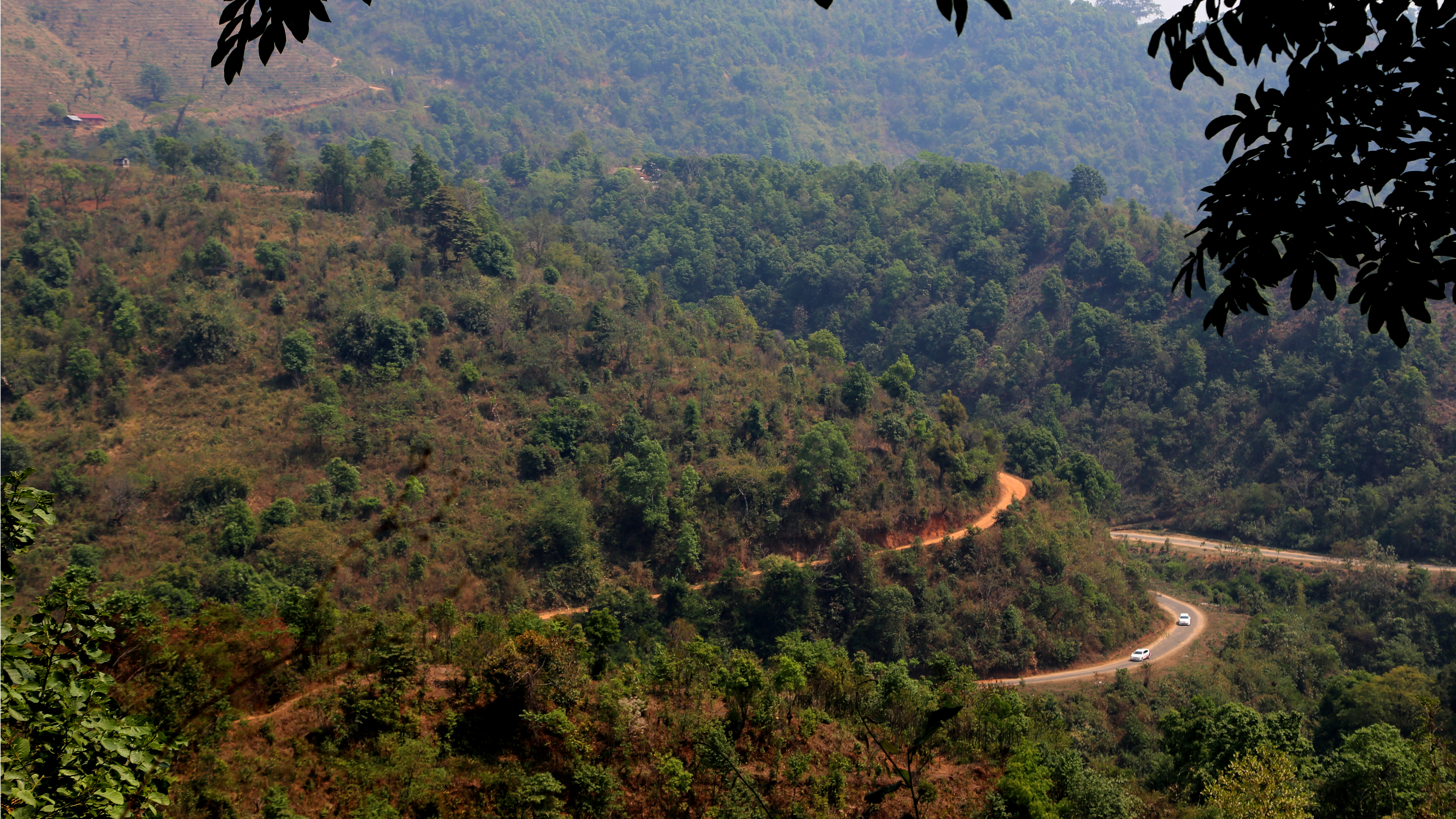
Road to Mogok

In early October 2025, the junta recaptured the district-level town of Kyaukme from the TNLA as part of their ongoing counteroffensive. By mid-October, Hsipaw fell to the Junta. On 29 October, the TNLA signed a ceasefire with the Tatmadaw and agreed to cede Mogok and Mongmit. TNLA Major General Tar Bone Kyaw stated that they were forced to sign the agreement because of ammunition and funding shortages.

After the TNLA withdrawal, the PDF moved into Mogok to take control of it. The Tatmadaw continued to advance against the PDF, taking among other places the Sedawgyi Dam. By mid-November, BNI reported that the Tatmadaw counter-offensive had retaken numerous cities amounting to 11.3% of the land it lost during Operation 1027. The Ta'ang National Army, as of mid-November, threatened the PDF that it would 'escort' the Tatmadaw into Mogok. In the second half of November, accusations were levied against TNLA over the cession of Mogok. Amid pressure, the PDF gave up Mogok.

Fighting broke out between the Tatmadaw and KIA along the Mogok–Momeik road. The PDF was reported to be fighting alongside KIA. Amid the fighting, Tatmadaw opted to set fire to parts of Mogok. Fighting for the town of Mogok itself continued into December. The TNLA then deployed troops to protect Tatmadaw in Mongmit and along the Mongmit-Mantong road, preventing an advance by the rebels from the east. The Tatmadaw dug defensive trenches in Mongmit to prevent KIA and PDF from taking the town.

In December, the Tatmadaw also took control of Singu in northern Mandalay Region, using a pincer movement to retake the towns connecting Mandalay to Mogok.

By mid January 2026, junta took control of Mogok and Momeik with the PDF present in the cities before TNLA's handover leaving for nearby positions. Fighting between the two continued in January under the newly established Mogok-Momeik Region Operation Command of the NUG. by 23 January, the Tatmadaw control solidified enough for the Mogok-Mandalay road to be reopened to the public.

In mid-March, the alliance between MNDAA and TNLA broke down over the issue of security cameras and to reopen the trade route to China. The MNDAA attacked TNLA-controlled Kutkai using drones and took the city on 16 March. PDF exited Mogok, surrendering it to Tatmadaw.

===== Sagaing-Kachin front =====
The PDF and allied KIA forces captured several Tatmadaw and Shanni Nationalities Army bases near the town of Banmauk starting on 17 September 2025 beginning the Battle of Banmauk. Banmauk was then besieged by the Shanni National Army. However, three days later, the PDF and the KIA still captured Banmauk in late September.

Fighting in Banmauk picked up in December. By January 2026, the junta recaptured half of Banmauk, and by February 8, most of the town had fallen to the SNA and Tatmadaw.

The PDF continued to contest Katha, entering the town in December 2025.

==== Continued offensives outside earthquake areas ====
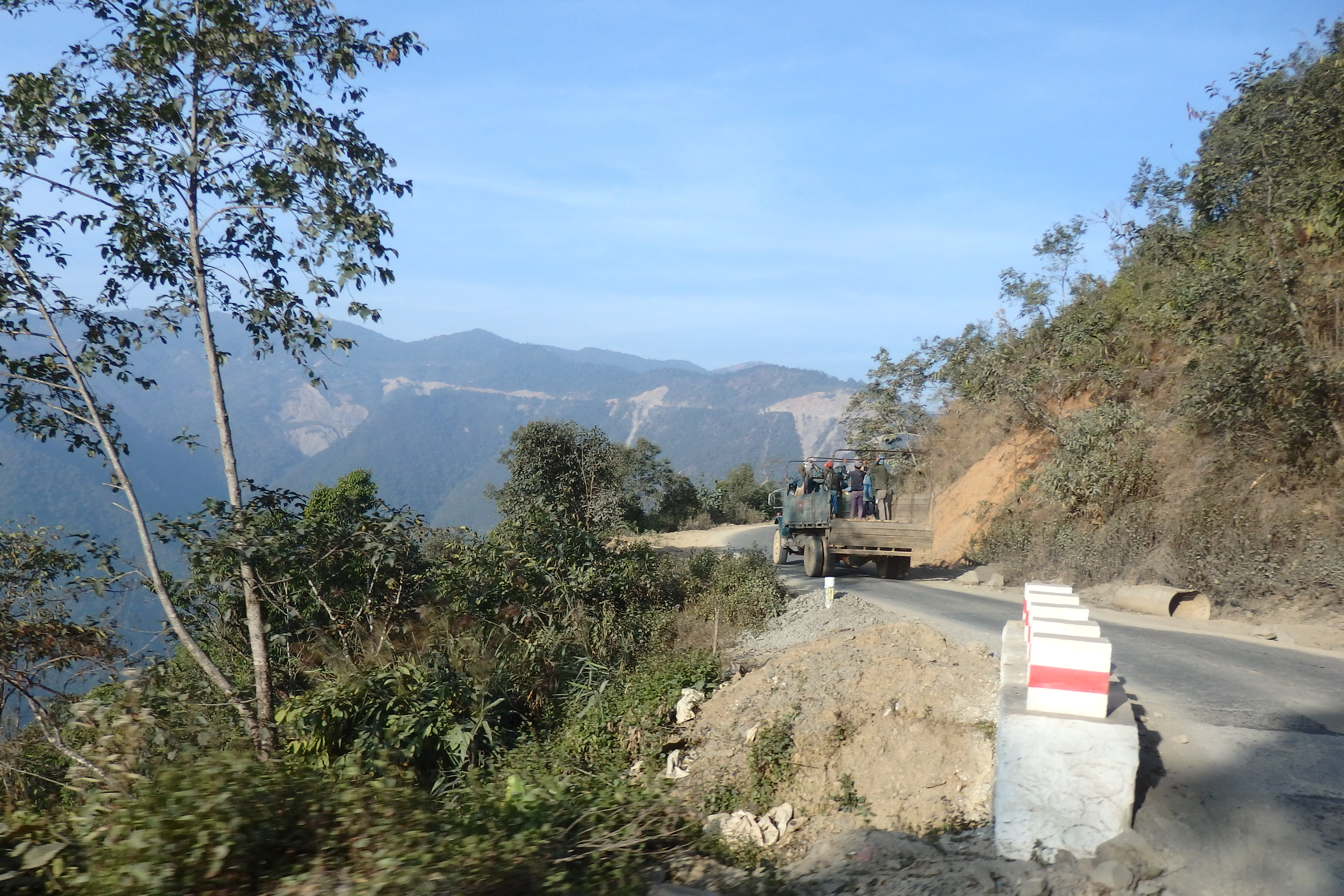
Road near Falam in 2016

In Chin State, the district capital Falam was captured by the Chin Brotherhood on 7 April 2025.

On 14 April 2025, a joint force of the Karen National Liberation Army and the PDF launched a coordinated offensive against junta’s headquarters and bases in Kyondoe, southern Karen State. On 9 May, the KNLA and its allies and seized the junta’s Htee Khee base on the Thai border in Dawei Township, Tanintharyi Region, capturing the border trade hub and strategic link in the oil and gas trade route between Dawei and Thailand. In November, The KNLA also captured Mawdaung in the Singkhon Pass along the Thai border.

On 10 June, the armed forces of the Burmese Communist Party shot down a junta fighter jet during the battle for Kan Dauk police station in Pale Township, Sagaing Region. It was the tenth such shoot-down since 2021. By 19 June, the Communists had taken the village and pushed out the junta forces.

===== Area around Myawaddy =====
In September 2025, the junta renewed efforts to control Myawaddy in Karen State. They began their offensive by advancing some 14 kilometres against the KNLA. By October, Lay Kay Kaw, south of the city, was stormed by the Tatmadaw. Fierce fighting nearby continued during late October with Tatmadaw making gains and Lay Kay Kaw changing hands.

As of January 2026, there was fresh fighting in Myawaddy. The Karen National Army, which completed their process to become an independent group in the beginning of 2026, retreated from the area.

===== Tatmadaw offensive in Rakhine =====
The junta also continued bombing campaigns in Rakhine State, destroying parts of the hospital in Arakan Army-controlled Ponnagyun on 28 March, with the Arakan Army continuing offensive operations in Kyaukphyu Township. Through the rest of 2025, the Arakan Army also had several clashes with the Tatmadaw.

In September 2025, the Tatmadaw launched an offensive to relieve encircled cities in Rahkine, with some initial victories for the Arakan Army. As heavy fighting continued, more Arakan victories were reported. The Tatmadaw sent reinforcements to the Sittwe front in October and advanced their position against the AA near Kyaukphyu in late October. In November, the Battle of Kyaukphyu began over control of the township. Fighting raged between the Tatmadaw and Arakan Army, with some territorial advances reported for the latter.

The Battle of Sittwe regained intensity in January 2026 as the AA seized key outposts. The Tatmadaw intensified efforts to enter Arakan territory from the south in February. However, in early March, Arakan Army advanced to within 1 mile of the capital.

===== Kayah State =====
The quake affected residents, limiting their water access. However, combat also continued in the Kayah theatre with junta airstrikes in Hrupso and Loikaw townships. Reportedly, some Karenni civilians initially confused the earthquake with airstrikes.

Several villages saw combat along the Loikaw-Hsihseng road. An undercover BBC team reported daily fighting in Mobye, with frontlines some 100 meters from a military base located there. In late June, fighting continued to be intense with homes in Saung Nan Khae being burnt by the junta. On 3 July, the Tatmadaw took Mobye back.

The village of Bawyan saw heavy fighting starting in September 2025. The Tatmadaw's armoured columns moved into Bawyan and its neighbour two villages of Salong North and Salong South. In early December, the Karenni coalition launched a counter-offensive in Pekon Township, around the village of Salong. Both sides suffered casualties amidst intense fighting near Bawyan and Salong involving artillery and drones.

On 19 August 2025, the Tatmadaw claimed control of Demoso in the Battle for Demoso. Karenni resistance forces denied the junta had taken full control of the town. By end of August, fighting was still ongoing, with control of the town split between Tatmadaw and Karenni resistance. Despite claims of fighting by the Karenni resistance, by October, Demoso was reportedly fully in Tatmadaw hands.

In February 2026, the Tatmadaw was reported to have broken the siege of Hpasawng with "overwhelming" forces, employing artillery and suicide drones to take the town back from the KNDF. The KNDF restricted access to the Thanlwin River located three kilometres south of the town. The Tatmadaw reportedly fought dozens of clashes with the Karenni resistance.

Fighting in the vicinity of Loikaw and elsewhere has seen skirmishes occur in September 2026, with casualties reported. During October 2026 fighting around Mobye has flared up, including drone strikes.

==== Formation of new alliances ====
In December 2025, the Spring Revolution Alliance was formed by 19 member groups largely consisting of groups adjacent to the PDF, forming a 10,000 member coalition.

In January 2026, a new Chin People's Army was formed by merging CDF–Mindat, CDF–Matupi, CDF–Kanpetlet, and CDF–Daai.

On 18 February 2026, the leader of the Burma National Revolutionary Army, Bo Nagar, surrendered and collaborated with the military. According to multiple reports, Bo Nagar was extracted from his operational area by a military helicopter.

== Humanitarian impact and war crimes ==
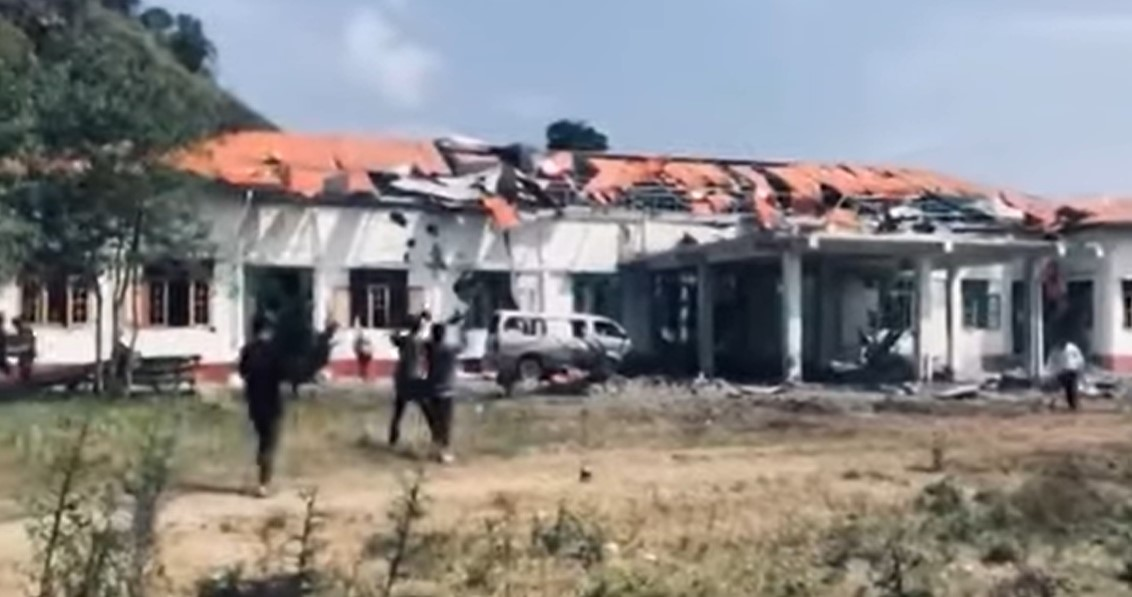
A hospital in Shan State was bombed by Myanmar Air Force, May 2024

The human rights situation in Myanmar has deteriorated substantially since the beginning of the civil conflict. The Burmese military has escalated its use of war crimes, including murder, mass killings, sexual violence, torture, arbitrary detention, attacks on religious buildings, and targeting civilians. The junta has also seized the properties of political opponents as part of an intimidation strategy, impacting hundreds of families. BBC News reports that the pro-junta paramilitary Pyusawhti militias have been accused of more than one atrocity against civilians.

Since the onset of the civil conflict, both the Burmese military and resistance forces alike have used educational facilities as bases and detention sites. In 2021, over 190 violent attacks on schools were reported in 13 of Myanmar's states and regions. As of June 2022, 7.8 million children remained out of school.

Myanmar's public health system has effectively collapsed, and the civil war has worsened the country's food security crisis, with one in four people experiencing food insecurity. Poverty and food insecurity have disproportionately affected Myanmar's Dry Zone and the Irrawaddy delta regions, which account for over 80% of the country's agricultural area and are home to a third of the country's population.

As of September 2022, 1.3 million people had been internally displaced, and over 13,000 children had been killed. By March 2023, the UN estimated that since the coup, 17.6 million people in Myanmar required humanitarian assistance, while 1.6 million were internally displaced, and 55,000 civilian buildings had been destroyed.

In March 2023 Volker Türk, the United Nations High Commissioner for Human Rights, reported that armed conflict had continued to grow. He stated that they were investigating hundreds of incidents of houses being burnt and civilians, including children, being killed. Overall, 15.2 million people faced food insecurity.

In March 2024 Tom Andrews, the United Nations Special Rapporteur on Human Rights in Myanmar, stated that 18.6 million people were in need of humanitarian aid.

On 27 November 2024, the International Criminal Court (ICC) prosecutor Karim Ahmad Khan filed an application for an international arrest warrant for Senior General and Acting President Min Aung Hlaing. As the acting president and commander-in-chief of the Myanmar Defence Services, Min Aung Hlaing "bears criminal responsibility for the crimes against humanity of deportation and persecution of the Rohingya, committed in Myanmar, and in part in Bangladesh," according to Khan. The arrest warrant request is the first by the ICC in its Bangladesh/Myanmar investigation. Human Rights Watch legal advisor Maria Elena Vignoli described the request as "a strong warning to Myanmar's abusive military leaders that they're not beyond the reach of the law". According to the Nyan Lin Thit Research Group, from February 2021 to April 2024, the military junta conducted 2,471 airstrikes across the country which resulted in the deaths of 1,295 civilians including women and children whereas injuring 1,634 others. The attacks destroyed 187 religious buildings, 114 schools, and 39 hospitals.

In October 2026, the United Nations Special Rapporteur on human rights in Myanmar said the military was deliberately attacking civilians to terrorise them into submission, reporting at least 8,384 civilians killed by the military since the February 2021 coup up to 15 September 2026.

== Economic impact ==
Economic conditions in Myanmar have substantially worsened due to the ongoing war and to economic mismanagement by the SAC. In 2021, Myanmar's GDP declined by 5.9%. In an interview, Christian Lechervy, the French ambassador to Myanmar, highlighted the impact of the coup on the country's economy: "In 2021, Myanmar's economic growth has contracted by more than 18%, poverty has doubled, the number of people in need of humanitarian aid has multiplied by seven and more than 450,000 people have been forced to flee their homes". Between March and June 2022, almost 10,000 people per month left the country through official channels, worsening the country's brain drain and mirroring the civilian exodus that followed the 1962 and 1988 military coups. The local job market has collapsed.

In September 2022 the G7-led Financial Action Task Force announced plans to blacklist Myanmar for failing to stem money laundering and terrorist financing. At that time, only Iran and North Korea were on the Financial Action Task Force blacklist. In October 2022, Myanmar was blacklisted by the task force, which increased volatility in the value of the Burmese kyat.

The war disrupted transport and stunted the export of agricultural goods like rice and corn, and the illegal cultivation of poppy became an economic pillar for many Burmese. Myanmar became the world's biggest opium producer, producing about 1,080 metric tons in 2023. In parts of the Dry Zone such as Sagaing Region's Ayadaw Township, cannabis supplanted betel nut, cotton, and rice due to economic downturn and rising pest infestation. During the war there has been a "mass refusal" among Myanmar's people to pay taxes and other charges to the junta, leading to a 33% drop in state revenue according to an analysis by the Special Advisory Council for Myanmar (SAC-M). According to the SAC-M, "69% of businesses reported not paying tax to the junta in the first three months of 2022". The cessation of payments of electricity bills by large portions of the population has also significantly cut off the junta's revenue sources.

The conflict also facilitated the conditions for the proliferation of human trafficking into fraud factories in Myanmar. In these facilities, foreign nationals are trafficked into the country and forced to commit online scams.

In August 2024 CNN published its year-long investigation concluding that approximately half of Myanmar's 54 million inhabitants live below the poverty line. This dire economic situation compels many to resort to extreme measures, including participating in the illicit trade of human organs online. Such transactions can yield an amount equivalent to two years' worth of salary. People often publicize their intent to sell organs on social media platforms, creating a relentless cycle in which families repeatedly turn to these transactions as their financial resources deplete.

To fund the war effort, the Tatmadaw in November 2026 proposed a greatly expanded scope of state expenditure in Myanmar on the military, with the Tatmadaw in 2026 increasing the military budget up to 10.53 trillion kyats (US$5.01 billion), which would bring the budget deficit from 8.98 trillion kyats to 11.41 trillion kyats.

=== Hyperinflation ===
By September 2022 the value of the Burmese kyat had depreciated by over 60%, while basic commodity prices had increased by up to 57%. The World Bank estimated Myanmar's economy would contract by 18% in 2022. Since April 2022, the country has experienced foreign currency shortages, which have acutely impacted importers, resulting in shortages of basic products like medicines and fertilisers. The military regime has imposed foreign currency controls, which has worsened the shortage of US dollars among international firms operating in the country. Many foreign and multinational companies, including Telenor, Ooredoo, Chevron, British American Tobacco and Woodside Energy have exited the Burmese market as the conflict has intensified.

At the end of July 2023 the SAC announced that it would issue a limited number of new 20,000-kyat banknotes. The announcement led to an increase in the price of gold, as well as in foreign currency exchange rates. In March 2024, it was reported that the civil war had significantly increased prices of everyday goods, such as rice (160–220%), fuel (520%), and palm oil (75%) from prewar levels. Also, the US dollar to Kyat exchange rate had increased by 160%.

In April 2024 the price of gold was around 4.5 million kyat per kyattha (a Burmese unit of mass) compared to 1 million per kyattha in February 2021. By May 2024 it was 5.8 million kyat per tical, and by September 2024 it was 7.2 million kyat per tical. The SAC regularly accuses goldsmiths of price manipulation when gold prices rise. An arrest of five traders and the closure of seven shops, caused the price to drop in early April 2024 as traders were fearful of doing business. By May 2024, the U.S. dollar to kyat exchange rate had increased from 1300 before the coup to 5000 on the black market, with the junta reportedly abandoning the fixed exchange rate of 2100.

=== Compensation for casualties ===
Since the 2021 coup, Myanmar’s military junta has frequently denied or delayed pensions and compensation to families of its own soldiers killed in action. Benefits are often withheld unless the soldier’s body is recovered, leaving many widows without financial support and contributing to school dropout rates for their children. Lower-ranking and conscripted soldiers’ families face the greatest difficulties. Higher-ranked officers’ families, meanwhile, sometimes receive lower compensation than they are entitled to, because the dead officers' military ranks are recorded as lower than those than they actually held.

=== Interim Central Bank (ICB) ===
The National Unity Government of Myanmar established an Interim Central Bank (ICB) led by its Planning, Finance and Investment minister, Tin Tun Naing. The goal of establishing this bank is to contest foreign reserves and assets held by the Central Bank in Naypitaw. It was also reported that the ICB seized 44 billion Kyats from other banks. Radio Free Asia explained in regards to Central Banks raising funds for their government; "The NUG has acknowledged raising over $150 million since the coup" and that while "it dwarfs in comparison to the revenue of the junta, which gave itself a raise of 51 percent in FY2023 to $2.7 billion—it's not insignificant either."

Under the direction of the ICB there is a newly established for-profit bank called Spring Development Bank, with an intent to establish its own cryptocurrency.

== Environmental impact ==
The deterioration in law and order in many parts of Myanmar has caused "a surge in illegal mining activities" in rural parts of the country. Environmental activists in Myanmar have accused the junta of supporting illegal mining of rare-earth elements which have "devastating and unpredictable consequences for the region’s ecosystem and inhabitants". Rivers have been contaminated, causing the destruction of local ecosystems, decreasing community access to clean water and disrupting agricultural activities of local farmers. The junta has cracked down on environmental activists who have criticized the government. The conflict has also seen a significant rise in deforestation in Myanmar.

== Manpower and procurement ==
=== Tatmadaw and allies ===
A February 2022 report by United Nations Special Rapporteur on Human Rights in Myanmar Tom Andrews stated that China, Russia, India, Belarus, Ukraine, Israel, Serbia, Pakistan and South Korea were selling weapons to the Tatmadaw. The Karen National Union documented the use of North Korean weaponry by the SAC in November 2023.

Anti-SAC forces have claimed that the Tatmadaw has severely struggled with recruitment and morale. The Tatmadaw has adopted drones in response to rebel groups using drones.

On 31 January 2023 the Ministry of Home Affairs issued a directive enabling organisations and citizens deemed "loyal to the state," including civilians, civil servants, and army personnel, to obtain firearms licenses. The regulatory shift has enabled the SAC to arm pro-military Pyusawhti militias and to suppress pro-democracy forces in light of waning military recruitment and their challenges with concurrently operating in multiple war theatres throughout the country. On 12 February 2023, a leaked document purportedly from the Ministry of Home Affairs detailed the SAC issuing firearms licenses to pro-military civilians for the operation of counter-insurgency paramilitaries based on the new firearm licensing directive.

==== SAC-aligned Pyusawhti militias form press gangs ====
SAC-aligned Pyusawhti militias have reportedly used force to recruit local men, but have been less than effective in building up grassroots enforcement on behalf of the junta, and have "taken root only in the small number of communities where the military's own party is traditionally strong."

One man contacted by the BBC in the area where Wathawa has been mobilising since early 2022 said he had only been able to recruit a maximum of 10–15 men in each village, and then only by threatening to burn down their homes.

He said many of the recruits had run away, and were being helped by other villagers to hide from Wathawa and his gun-toting monks.

In early December 2023, the Tatmadaw-led government appealed for deserters to return, promising them exoneration. The National Unity Government claimed that 20,000 soldiers who had deserted had rejoined its ranks. By 7 December, the junta began freeing soldiers who had been jailed for desertion to ease apparent manpower shortages as a result of battlefield pressures from recent operations.

On 10 February 2024, the Tatmadaw announced the People's Military Service Law, requiring all men aged 18 to 35 and women aged 18 to 27 to complete up to two years of mandatory military service, amid its territorial losses. Those who fail to enlist face imprisonment for up to five years during a national emergency. This announcement has been interpreted by some as a sign of increasing desperation in the face of steadily advancing resistance forces. In the wake of the announcement, Deutsche Welle also reported that "thousands" of young people were fleeing to Thailand to evade conscription before it came into effect. Local Myanmar government officials are reportedly extorting bribes from those seeking to avoid being conscripted. 21 administrators in Rakhine's Thandwe announced their resignation in response to the military recruitment. Rebel groups killed at least 37 local officials carrying out the junta's conscription efforts.

Activist Thinzar Shunlei Yi thought the military's historic "indoctrination techniques are deeply rooted in nationalism and religious ideologies" leaving "soldiers and their families feeling disoriented amidst shifting societal paradigms".

=== Anti-junta forces ===
The limited possession of guns by ethnic insurgent movements along with the lack of international support and formal means of acquiring military material has presented the anti-junta forces with a challenging situation for the confrontation of the military regime. Faced with this difficulty since the early stages of the armed insurgency, the resistance movement sought ways to manufacture the necessary weapons and equipment for the conflict. Initially, the rebels expanded the production of a traditionally made, single-shot rifle known as Tumi, especially in the Chin state. Nonetheless, this kind of rifle is severely limited for battleground action. For this reason, the fighters have developed alternative models which are more advanced, while still calling them Tumi. Since then, the resistance movement has developed many kinds of carbines, landmines and bomb drones, to be manufactured within the technological and material means of liberated territories and underground cells.

Commercially available drones rigged to carry bombs were used to attack military positions. PDF groups reportedly produced naval bombs to target government logistics in rivers. Meanwhile, defected soldiers developed 60 mm long-range mortars. The use of 3D printing was also reported, both to salvage weapons taken from the junta and for the improvised production of FGC-9 semiautomatic carbines. An arms trafficker in possession of nuclear materials was found working with an unnamed insurgent ethnic armed group in Myanmar. The success of Operation 1027 enabled the Brotherhood Alliance to seize enormous caches of arms and ammunition from the Tatmadaw, making it better equipped than before it launched Operation 1027.

On 20 August 2025, the United Wa State Army declared that they would no longer provide weapons or financial aid to the Ta'ang National Liberation Army, Myanmar National Democratic Alliance Army, and Shan State Army (SSPP). Speculation arose that the UWSA's announcement, combined with Tatmadaw offenses in Shan State, contributed to a rise in prices for weapons and ammunition in the supply chains of the anti-junta insurgencies. According to the Irrawaddy, the Arakan Army has been regarded as the strongest anti-junta ethnic armed organisation in the country; while the UWSA is believed to have greater financing and equipment, the AA is estimated to have over 50,000 personnel, making it the largest active ethnic army in the country.

== Foreign involvement and spillover ==
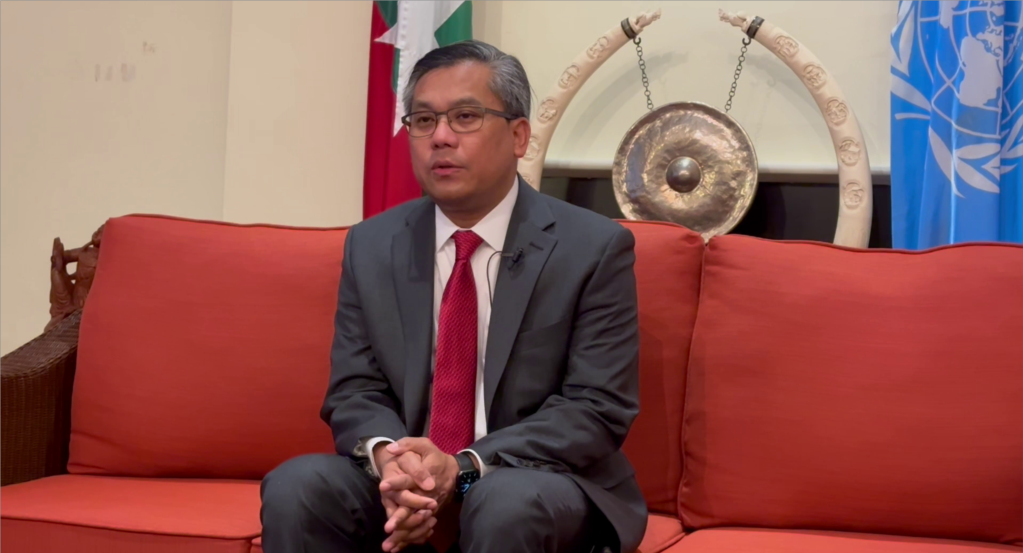
NUG's UN Ambassador Kyaw Moe Tun talks in an interview in 2022.

In June 2021 the United Nations General Assembly passed a non-binding resolution asking member states to impose an arms embargo on Myanmar. Two hundred international organisations, including Amnesty International and Human Rights Watch have continued to press the UN and its member states to adopt a global arms embargo. The United States, the United Kingdom, Canada, and the European Union have, in response to the ongoing violence, sanctioned individuals and organisations associated with the Burmese military. However, the effectiveness of these sanctions has been undermined by poor coordination among governments and the lack of sanctions against high-impact targets.

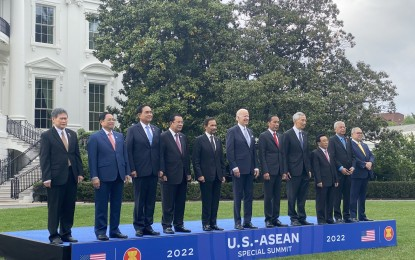
Myanmar absent at the US-ASEAN Summit 2022 in Washington, D.C.

ASEAN blocked Myanmar from participating in regional summits after the 2021 coup. However, this was reversed after New Zealand invited junta officials to two ASEAN Summits hosted in Wellington in April 2024. ASEAN member states have not taken a consistent, coordinated approach with respect to the ongoing civil war, due to internal divisions. Brunei, Indonesia, Malaysia, the Philippines and Singapore are strongly opposed to the military junta, but Thailand was a key ally of the junta until the election of Srettha Thavisin as prime minister. After the election of Anutin Charnvirakul as prime minister, the Thai government has reapproached Myanmar, bolstering the international legitimacy of the Burmese government. Newly inaugurated president Min Aung Hlaing arrived in Bangkok, on a landmark visit, on the 6th of April, 2026.

India, which represents Myanmar's fourth-largest export market and fifth-largest import partner, has continued a business-as-usual approach to cross-border relations and continues to recognize the military junta. State-owned and private Indian companies supply arms and raw materials to the junta. On the other hand, India had hostile relations with China for the first several years of the war, which in part may have contributed to India's ongoing support for the junta as a balance attempt to prevent Chinese encroachment, which is met with criticism. Through the regional governments of Manipur and Mizoram, India also established de-facto relations with Chin and Rakhine rebels, while also reinforcing the border with Assam Rifles paramilitary soldiers.

Bangladesh recognizes the military junta, but does not support its actions, in part because the Rohingya genocide has led to more than 1 million Rohingya refugees fleeing to Bangladesh.Its position in the conflict has been informed by repeated spillovers of the conflict into its territory. After the entire Bangladesh-Myanmar came under the control of the Arakan Army, the Bengali government initiated informal relations with the militant organisation, while also trying to clamp down on Rohingya groups operating on their territory.

As of December 2023 East Timor remains the only government to have openly expressed sympathies to the anti-regime forces in Myanmar. In August 2023, the State Administration Council expelled the East Timorese ambassador in retaliation for the East Timorese government meeting with the NUG.

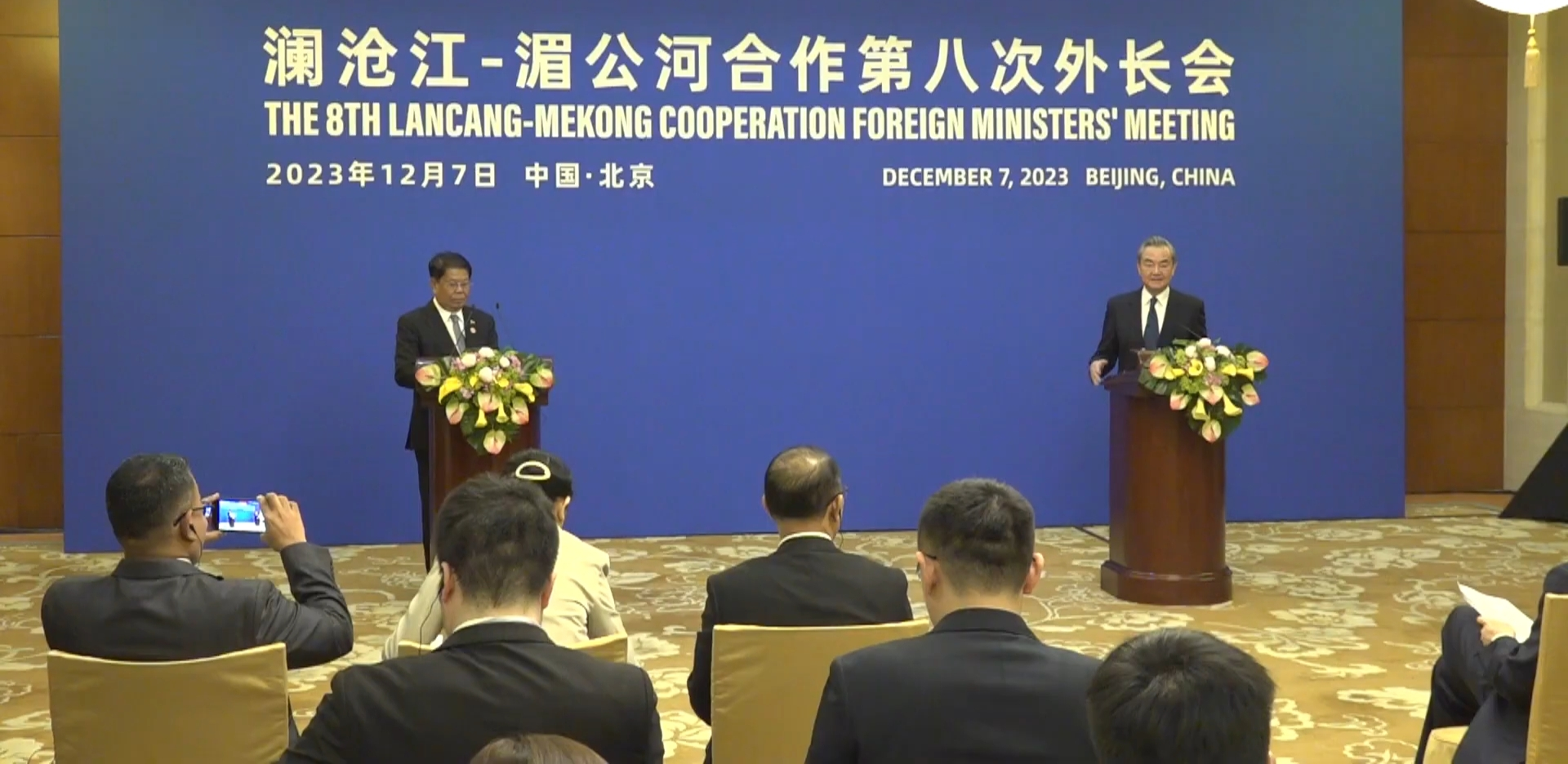
In 2023, Director of the Office of the Central Foreign Affairs Commission Wang Yi and Myanmar's Foreign Minister Than Swe jointly meet the press after the eighth LMC Foreign Ministers' Meeting.

Since the coup d'état, China and Russia have supported the military junta and have been its main arms suppliers. China is Myanmar's largest trading partner. The two countries have blocked any substantive action against Myanmar's military at the United Nations Security Council, while Myanmar's security forces have reportedly used Chinese and Russian-supplied weapons to perpetrate human rights violations. Chinese support for the junta and rebel groups in Shan State has led to a rise in popular anti-Chinese sentiment in Myanmar. However, the fact that the Three Brotherhood Alliance's Operation 1027 in late 2023 was carried out near the China–Myanmar border indicated an initial shift in China's stance, which was attributed by analysts to concerns about cyber-scam centers, the pursuit of favorable concessions from the junta on the China-Myanmar Economic Corridor, and the opportunity to influence the PDF in light of evolving dynamics between NUG and EAO groups. Since 2024, Beijing has played a key role in reintegrating Myanmar back into the international community, pressuring rebel groups operating in Shan State to reopen the Muse-Mandalay road, a key logistical artery for Chinese imports/exports and the wider Belt and Road Initiative. In a video recorded by pro-Tatmadaw media during the 2025 Tianjin SCO summit, Min Aung Hlaing personally thanked China for "exerting pressure on the armed groups in the border regions for the development of northern Myanmar."

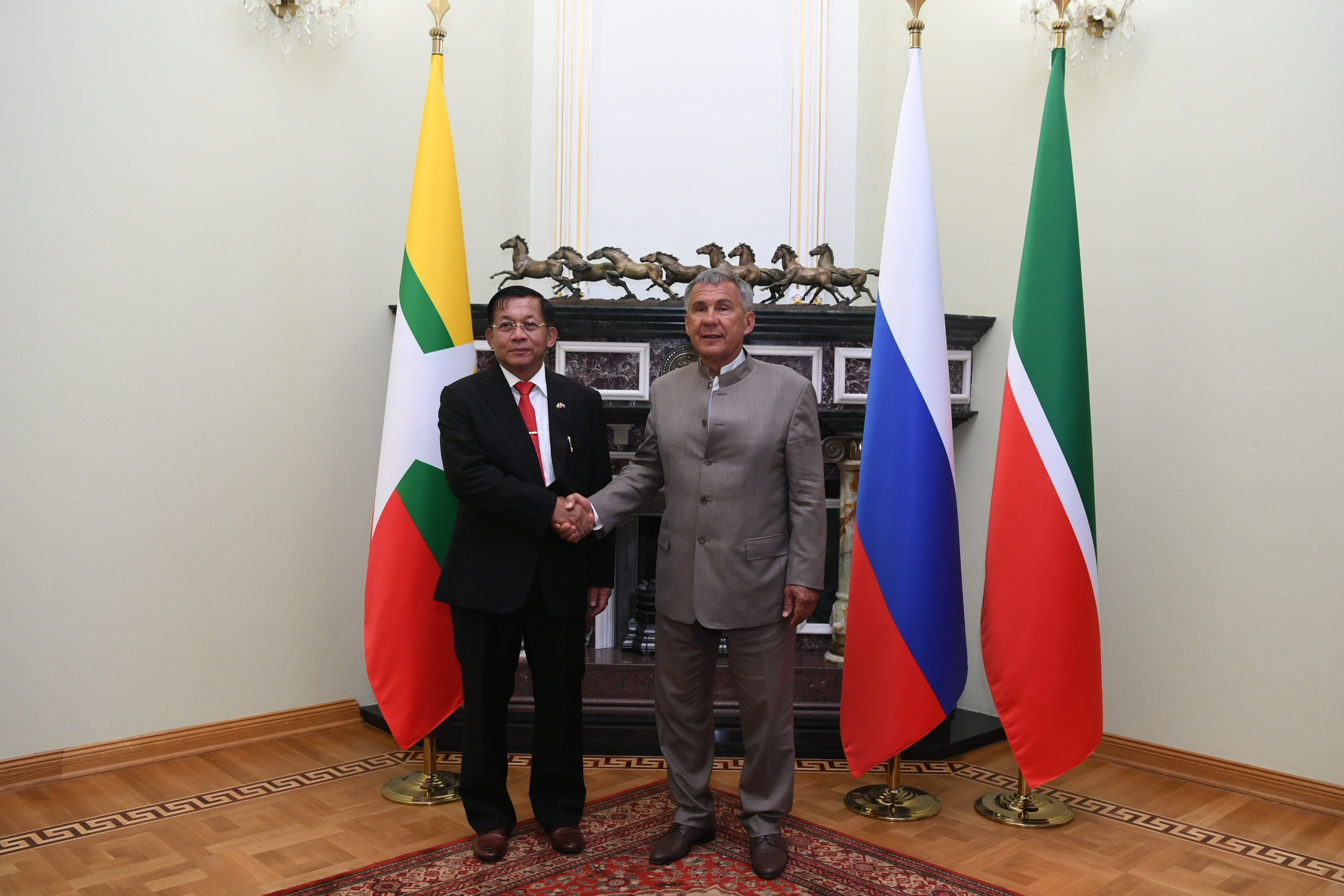
Min Aung Hlaing meets Head Rais Rustam Minnikhanov of Tatarstan in Russia, June 2021.

Russia has embraced deeper ties with the Burmese military junta as the civil war has progressed. Russia has provided materiel, military training for over 50 Myanmar Air Force pilots, and diplomatic backing to the regime. Min Aung Hlaing has visited Russia several times, personally meeting with Russian president Vladimir Putin in September 2022. The military junta backed the Russian invasion of Ukraine. Russia was among the few countries (Note: Belarus, Cambodia, North Korea, Russia, and Syria sent congratulatory messages to the State Administration Council for Myanmar's Independence Day on 4 January 2024.) to send a congratulatory message to the junta on Myanmar's Independence Day. In March 2024, Special Rapporteur Tom Andrews saw Russia as still the junta's top source of weapons.

Although small in number, foreign volunteers serving with anti-junta forces have been documented. One such volunteer, going under the nom de guerre Azad, joined the Anti-Fascist Internationalist Front to assist fighters in the Chin theater. Azad gained military experience while fighting in the Syrian Rojava conflict. Foreign volunteers are also present in Karen State, with most being members of the humanitarian Free Burma Rangers organisation. While FBR associates use weapons only for self-defence, some members have joined local rebel groups fighting the Tatmadaw, offering their expertise in many fields, such as drone technology, as is the case with the Federal Wings, a group that contributes to rebel drone R&D. The KNLA is also one of the few EAO's to accept foreign volunteers in their rankings, a tradition that dates back to the Cold War era in Burma. International volunteers in Karen State have justified their presence for a number of reasons, including: defending Kayin Christians, assisting rebel groups and contributing to the reinstallation of a democratic regime in Myanmar.

== See also ==
- 2021 Myanmar coup d'état
- Timeline of the Myanmar civil war (2021–present)
- Myanmar conflict
- Nationwide Ceasefire Agreement
- Myanmar protests (2021–present)
- Military rule in Myanmar
- Tatmadaw (Burmese national military)
- People's Defence Force (Myanmar)
- List of ethnic armed organisations in Myanmar
- Women in the Myanmar civil war (2021–present)
- 8888 uprising
