= Kachin offensive (2024–present) =

2024 rebel military operation in Kachin State, Myanmar

- Part of the Myanmar civil war
Date	7 March 2024 – present (1 year, 11 months, 3 weeks and 3 days)
Location	Kachin State
Status	Ongoing
Territorial changes	Kachin forces capture over 90 SAC positions along the Myitkyina-Bhamo Road; Kachin forces capture Sadung; Kachin forces capture and abolish Kachin Special Region-1; Kachin and allied groups seize Mansi Township and attacks Bhamo

Belligerents
Tatmadaw	Kachin Independence Army and several other Kachin-based resistance groups

Commanders and leaders
Soe Win; Mya Tun Oo; Sao Meim Liam; U Shwe Min †	Htang Gam Shawng

Units involved
Tatmadaw; Myanmar Army; Northern Command; Border Guard Forces; New Democratic Army - Kachin; Myanmar Air Force; Myanmar Police Force; Pro-junta groups: Pyusawhti militias; Shanni Nationalities Army; Wuyang People's Militia; Khaunglanhpu People’s Militia	Kachin Independence Army; Kachin People's Defence Force; Several other Kachin-based groups; Kagabu People’s Force; Other anti-junta forces: Arakan Army

Strength
Unknown	21,500+

Casualties and losses
40+ killed "100s surrendered"	6+ killed

The Kachin Independence Army's (KIA) offensive in Kachin State, known unofficially as Operation 0307 (after the date it began), is an ongoing military operation against the Tatmadaw military junta of Myanmar which began on 7 March 2024. Primarily centred along the road connecting Myitkyina to Bhamo, Operation 0307 was launched to capture junta bases which could threaten Laiza, the headquarters of the KIA. Operation 0307 was launched alongside concurrent KIA offensives against Hpakant and northern Shan State, and concurrent resistance offensives throughout Myanmar.

== Previous offensives ==
=== Hpakant ===
Starting late February 2024, the KIA and KPDF launched raids on Tatmadaw positions in Hpakant. During April 2024, the KIA launched attacks on Tatmadaw and SNA positions in Hpakant Township. They seized a base overlooking the road between Hpakant and Kamaing, where checkpoints were used to extort civilians and collect vehicle fines. Eventually, they, along with the Kachin People's Defense Force, seized the last outpost near the Hpakant-Tamakan-Sezin road.

=== Northern Shan State ===
After the Chinese-brokered ceasefire in Northern Shan State between the Three Brotherhood Alliance and the Tatmadaw, the Kachin Independence Army (KIA), alongside the Kachin People's Defense Force (KPDF) and the All Burma Students' Democratic Front (ABSDF), began an offensive into northern Shan State with the objective to capture Mongmit District. On 18 January, the allied forces began attacks on Mongmit, captured the Mongmit Police Station and 2 nearby villages. Junta forces responded with air and artillery barrages on the town, forcing allied resistance to put the town under siege. During the offensive on Mongmit, the KIA and allied forces also began launching attacks on neighboring Mabein on 19 January. On 21 January, after several days of fighting, allied resistance captured Mabein and most of the surrounding township. During fighting in Mansi Township on the same day, 17 junta soldiers were forced to cross the China-Myanmar border. On 25 March, allied resistance was forced to withdraw from Mongmit. On 26 March, the KIA captured Nam Hpat Kar village in Kutkai Township.

==== Tensions with the TNLA ====
The KIA and the Ta'ang National Liberation Army (TNLA), members of the Northern Alliance and allies, began to experience tense relations in the beginning of February. On 4 February, it was reported that 50 KIA soldiers entered Kutkai, which has been under the control of the TNLA since January. The soldiers told a TNLA checkpoint that they would not stay the night, but they proceeded to deploy in the town centre to celebrate Kachin Revolution Day, setting up flags and telling households to send representatives to a military parade they were reportedly holding the next day without informing the TNLA. In response, the TNLA removed flags and reportedly threatened unarmed civilians. Due to rumours that the KIA was planning to advance on the town from positions in Nam Hpat Kar, residents of Kutkai were concerned that clashes between the 2 armies could erupt.

== Timeline ==
=== Operation 0307 ===
On 7 March, the KIA simultaneously launched attacks on over ten junta outposts in eastern Kachin. Fighting primarily took place along the highway between Bhamo and the Kachin State capital, Myitkyina, as well as around Laiza. The attacks were the beginning of a wider offensive in Kachin State- colloquially termed Operation 0307. Over 8 March, the KIA seized three major junta bases and several outposts, including Hpyun Pyen Bum, a junta's closest forward base to Laiza. The KIA and AA continued defending their headquarters and they allege that junta airstrikes had landed on the Chinese side of the border, east of Laiza. During the fighting, a Lisu junta-aligned Lisu National Development Party militia leader was killed in Aung Myay Thit village.

On 8 March, the KIA captured a junta camp north of Sumprabum and began attacking the town and its junta garrison post on 14 March. The attacks were likely part of a larger objective to block off northern Kachin for future offensives into Putao. A week after the start of the offensive, Dawthponeyan subtownship was captured the KIA.

By 22 March, the KIA claimed to have captured over 50 military outposts and 13 strategically significant junta bases around the Myitkyina-Bhamo Road, including: all outposts surrounding Laiza, battalion headquarters in 5 townships, and camps near the KIA's old headquarters of Pajau. The Irrawaddy predicted on 23 March that the KIA might attack Bhamo, the headquarters of the 21st Military Operations Command, as the next target of their offensive.

On 28 March, KIA seized two junta bases in Yaw Yone and Nga Gayan near Lweje town on the Chinese border in Momauk Township. By 1 April, the KIA captured the entirety of the Bhamo-Lweje road. On 9 April, the KIA captured Lweje, stating that border trade would resume after a few weeks.

On 11 April, Namtyar village was captured by the KIA along the Hpakant-Kamaing road, cutting off one of the major roads to Hpakant. On 24 April, after weeks of attacks, the KIA captured Sezin, cutting off all major roads to Hpakant and completely encircling the town. After capturing the town's police station over a month earlier, the KIA captured Sinbo on 29 April, cutting off the Bhamo-Myitkyina road and encircling Bhamo.

On 4 May, the KIA launched simultaneous offensives on junta positions in several areas throughout Waingmaw Township, capturing several junta bases. Between 4-5 May, the KIA captured the Sumprabum Tactical Command Center and several junta camps around Sumprabum. By 8 May, the entirety of Sumprabum and its surrounding township was captured. The same day, the KIA announced that it had captured over 80 junta outposts, including 11 battalion headquarters, since the start of the offensive.

On 9 May, the KIA reported that junta soldiers had withdrew from Momauk, and that they had captured both Momauk and neighboring Mansi's police stations. The same day, the KIA launched an attack on the Balaminhtin Bridge at the entrance to Myitkyina. By 13 May, the KIA claimed to have captured half of Mansi. On 16 May, the KIA captured the Nam Byu base southwest of Tanai.

On 18 May, KIA-led resistance ambushed reinforcements sent by the junta from Putao to recaptured Sumprabum, leading to heavy junta casualties. The same day, the KIA launched an offensive in Waingmaw Township, capturing almost a dozen junta bases by 20 May. On 19 May, KIA forces captured the junta base controlling the entrance to Waingmaw.

On 4 June renewed clashes broke out outside of Momeik after KIA forces advanced to Lelgyi village. After an hour, KIA forces retreated. On 11 June, KIA forces launched an offensive to capture the Waingmaw-Sadung-Kanpaikti road. The next day, the entire road had been captured, with junta forces retreating from Sadung and Waingmaw, and cutting off Myitkyina from the border. A Border Guard Force outpost was also captured. On 15 July, junta forces launched an offensive to recapture areas near Momauk. On 15 August, KIA forces capture the La Maung Camp, overlooking Hpakant. On 19 August, KIA forces captured the last junta base in Momauk after months of fighting, completing their capture of the township. Shortly after, junta forces launched a counteroffensive to retake the town, but were stalled at Aung Myay village. On 7 September, KIA forces began attacking Singtawn -outside Hpakant- after junta forces raided a hotel in the area, capturing the village 1 month later. In late September, it was reported that junta forces were preparing an offensive to retake Sumprabum and Tiyangzug.

=== Capture of Kachin Special Region-1 ===
On 29 September, the KIA launched an offensive on Chipwi and Hsawlaw, capturing both towns by 2 October. The offensive marked the beginning of a wider operation across Special Region-1, which had been controlled by the junta-aligned New Democratic Army – Kachin (officially the Kachin Border Guard Force) since 1994. The KIA requested for the defection of the Border Guard Forces, which was denied. In response, the KIA launched an offensive on Kachin BGF battalions 1002 and 1003, capturing both by 22 October. After the bases capture, the KIA captured the BGF headquarters in the town of Pang War on 20 October after Kachin BGF leader Zahkung Ting Ying fled to China. On 1 November, the KIA launched an attack on the final BGF 1001 bases at Nuzaungbaung and Phimaw, capturing both by the next day. Border Guard Forces reportedly fled to Kangfang (Ganfai), which the KIA captured days later. On 10 November, KIA forces captured Lanse village, the last NDA-K base in northern Kachin Special Region 1 (KSR1). On 20 November, despite Chinese pressure not to, the KIA captured Kanpaikti, the final NDA-K base. Kanpaikti's capture brought the entirety of Special Region-1 under KIA control. The region was subsequently abolished with the KIA intending to integrate it with the rest of Kachin State.

=== Bhamo offensive ===
On 4 December, the KIA initiated an offensive in Bhamo District. The KIA took full control of Mansi on 8 January after defeating Light Infantry Battalions 319 and 601, as well as Artillery Battalion 352. The KIA simultaneously attacked Bhamo town, which hosts Military Operations Command 21. On 26 January, the KIA seized Bhamo Airport.

== See also ==
- Operation 1027
  - Rakhine offensive
- Battle of Bhamo (2024)
