= Upper Myanmar =

Geographical region of Myanmar

Coordinates: 25°N 96°E

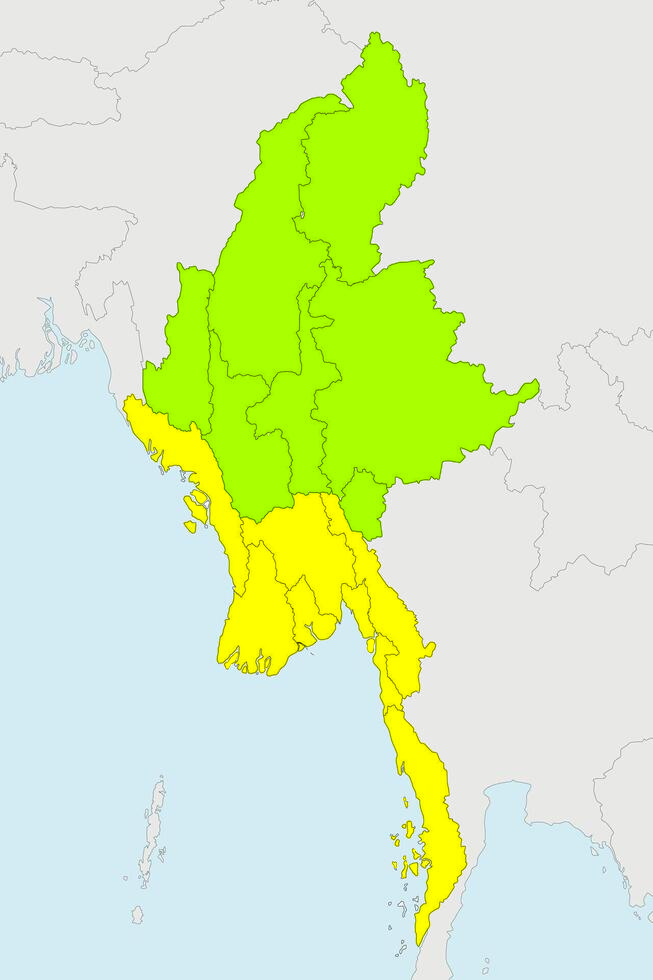
Map of Myanmar showing Upper Myanmar in green and Lower Myanmar in yellow

Upper Myanmar (Burmese: အထက်မြန်မာပြည် or မြန်မာပြည်အထက်ပိုင်း, also called Upper Burma) is one of two geographic regions in Myanmar, the other being Lower Myanmar. Located in the country's centre and north stretches, Upper Myanmar encompasses six inland states and regions, including Mandalay, Sagaing, Magway Regions, and Chin, Kachin and Shan States. By contrast, Lower Myanmar encompases the southern and coastal-facing regions of Myanmar. Upper Myanmar is home to several distinct cultural regions, including the homeland of the Bamar in the low-lying central plains, and those of the Chin, Kachin, and Shan peoples in the highlands. It is home to over 23 million people and benefits from neighboring multiple countries. Four of Myanmar's ten largest cities, Mandalay, Taunggyi, Monywa, and Myitkyina, are located in the region.

== Geography ==
Upper Myanmar is geographically diverse, bounded by the Himalayas and Tibetan Plateau to the north, and the Arakan Mountains to the west, the latter of which separates this region from Rakhine State in Lower Myanmar. Upper Myanmar is home to the country's highest peak, Hkakabo Razi. The region is bisected by the country's primary river, the Irrawaddy River, which runs throughout the length of the country. The eastern stretches of Upper Myanmar are surrounded by the Shan Hills, and the Thanlwin River, which separates parts of Myanmar from China and Thailand. The low-lying central plains (also dubbed the 'Irrawaddy Basin') between the Arakan Mountains and Shan Hills are predominantly inhabited by the Bamar, while the Shan Hills are inhabited by various Shan-speaking ethnic groups and other minorities.

== History ==
In 1044, King Anawratha established Pagan Kingdom in the present day Upper Myanmar region. After the Mongol invasion and the collapse of the Pagan Kingdom, it became Myinsaing Kingdom. In 1313 and 1315, the regency was divided into two Kingdoms. The northern part of the Upper Myanmar region became Sagaing Kingdom and the southern part of the region became Pinya Kingdom. Sagaing Kingdom and Pinya Kingdom reunited as Ava Kingdom in 1326. Ava Kingdom was divided into three provinces: Ava, Prome and Toungoo. Prome Kingdom and Toungoo Dynasty became independent from Ava Kingdom in 1482 and 1510 respectively. The newly independent Toungoo Dynasty conquered Prome Kingdom in 1542 and Ava Kingdom in 1555. Ava became a province of Toungoo Dynasty. During the late 17th century, Prome and Toungoo provinces were merged into Ava province. In 1762, Ava province became a province of Konbaung Dynasty with the name of Upper province (အညာ). After the loss of Second Anglo-Burmese war, British annexed Prome and Toungoo from Upper province. After the fall of the Konbaung Dynasty in 1885, the British divided Upper province into three new division: Magwe Division, Mandalay Division and Sagaing Division. The British also added the Chin Hills to the Magwe Division and Kachin Mountains to the Sagaing Division. After independence in 1948, the Burmese government established Kachin State and Chin Special Division.

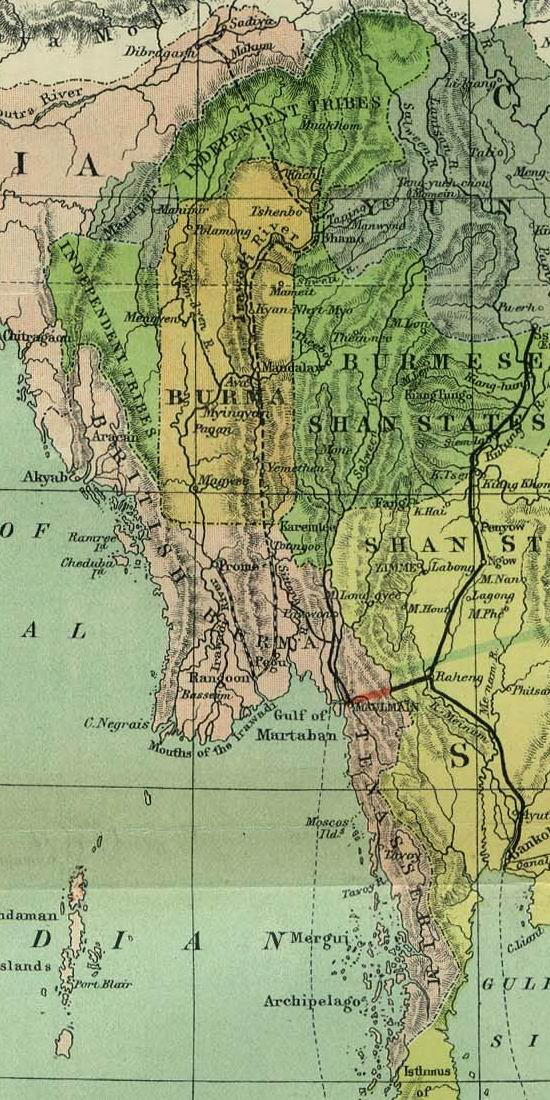
The British subdivided their colonial possessions in Myanmar into three regions: Upper Burma in orange; Lower Burma in pink; and the Frontier Areas in green (as of 1885).

The term 'Upper Burma' was first used by the British to refer to the central and northern areas of what is now modern-day Myanmar, a division that accentuated between 1852 and 1885. After the Second Anglo-Burmese War of 1852, Lower Burma was annexed by the British Empire, while Upper Burma remained independent under the Konbaung empire until the Third Anglo-Burmese War of 1885. Historically, Upper Burma was predominantly Burman (whereas Lower Myanmar was historically Mon-speaking until the early 19th century), while the Frontier Areas, as designated by the colonial administration, included areas inhabited by ethnic minorities, such as modern Kachin State and Chin State. The northernmost boundary of the Myanmar king’s territory in Upper Myanmar :

It is found that the northernmost boundary of the Myanmar king’s territory in Upper Myanmar was defined as follows: “From the Sagaing–Indian border along the course of the Uru River up to the upper vicinity of Hpakant; from Hpakant slightly southward and then straight east to the hills north of Kamaing; from those hills eastward in a straight line to Hmanpra Taung (the mountain north of Myitkyina); from that mountain straight downward past the hills east of Khatcho, Talawgyi, and Manphing villages, following the eastern bank and course of the Ayeyarwady River up to Bhamo.”

In the aftermath of the 2021 Myanmar coup d'état, Upper Myanmar, including the Bamar heartland, has become a major centre of anti-military resistance and fighting in the ongoing Myanmar civil war (2021–present), due to the presence of People's Defence Forces and ethnic armed organisations.

== Administration ==
Upper Myanmar continues to be used as a geographic designation with respect to government administration and legislation. The national government's Ministry of Home Affairs invokes separate land and revenue laws for Upper and Lower Myanmar. Myanmar's national weather agency, the Department of Meteorology and Hydrology, has a dedicated sub-department for Upper Myanmar. Likewise, the country's civil service commission, the Union Civil Service Board, operates separate civil service academies for Upper and Lower Myanmar. Until 2015, Myanmar's Department of Higher Education was divided into separate departments to support tertiary schools in Upper and Lower Myanmar.

Parts of Kachin and Shan States remain contested; they are administered to varying degrees by the central government as well as numerous non-state actors like ethnic armed organisations. Upper Myanmar is also home to all of the country's self-administered zones: Danu, Kokang, Naga, Pa Laung, Pa'O, and Wa.

== Cultural regions ==
=== Bamar heartland ===
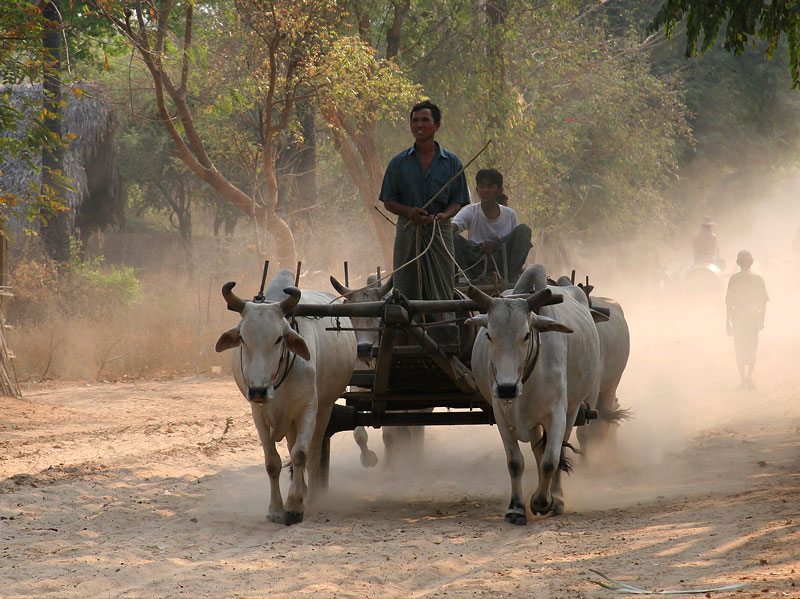
Men on an ox-drawn cart in Bagan, a historic royal capital in the Anya region, the cultural heartland of the Bamar.

Anya (အညာ, lit. 'upstream', also spelt Anyar), the Bamar heartland, is situated around the low-lying central plains of the Chindwin and Irrawaddy Rivers that now comprise Sagaing, Magway, and Mandalay regions. The region has been the homeland of the predominantly Buddhist Bamar people for over a millennium. The Anya region (အညာဒေသ) is often called the 'Central Dry Zone' in English due to its paucity of rainfall and reliance on water irrigation. For 1,100 years, this region was home to a series of Burmese royal capitals, until the British annexation of Upper Burma (the last remaining part of the Konbaung Kingdom) in 1885. Bamar from this region are called anyar thar (အညာသား) in Burmese, while their counterparts from Lower Myanmar are called auk tha (အောက်သား).

== Economy ==
Agricultural cultivation is a mainstay in Upper Myanmar. The region's proximity to major undammed rivers has also made it the site of many hydropower dams. Natural resources also play a big role in the economy, including the extraction of timber (including Teak), precious gems (including jade, rubies, sapphires and gems), metals and minerals (including silver, lead, zinc, and gold, barite). Sharing of natural resources remains primary factor driving armed conflict in many parts of Upper Myanmar. Upper Myanmar is also home to controversial economic projects, including the Myitsone Dam and Letpadaung Copper Mine. Upper Myanmar's contested border regions, particularly the Golden Triangle and Wa State, are also major global producers of methamphetamines and opium.

=== Agriculture ===
The Central Dry Zone in Upper Myanmar cultivates 35% of the country's grain crops and occupies two-thirds of the country's arable land. However, the region is remains food insecure, and is the most water-stressed region of the country, due to lack of regular rainfall (the lowest in the country, at 500–1,000 mm (20–39 in)), inequitable distribution of water, and climate change, which has intensified droughts in the region. 80% of the land there is used to grow pulses (e.g., chickpea, black gram, mung bean, etc.), legumes, sesame, and sunflower. Shan State cultivates most of Myanmar's soybeans.

=== Border trade ===
Upper Myanmar is a major hub for border trade due to its shared borders with India, China, Laos and Thailand. The region is home to all five of Myanmar's official border gates with China (i.e., Muse, Chinshwehaw, Lweje, Kanpaikti, and Kyaingtong), one of seven border gates with Thailand (i.e., Tachileik), and both border gates with India (Tamu and Rikhawdar). In 2022, total trade volume at these gates stood at US$2.7 billion.

2022 Total Trade Volume (in US$ millions)
Border Gate	Exports	Imports	Trade Volume
Muse-Ruili	1832.468	266.897	2099.365
Chinshwehaw-Qingshuihe	153.496	129.900	283.396
Tachileik-Mae Sai	45.092	85.572	130.664
Lweje-Zhangfeng	90.276	32.484	122.760
Kanpaikti-Houqiao	77.357	10.824	88.181
Tamu-Moreh	9.352	5.782	15.134
Kyaingtong	7.192	3.332	10.524
2022 total	2215.233	534.791	2750.024

== Population ==
According to the 2014 Myanmar Census, Upper Myanmar had a population of 23,354,199, who make up 46% of the country's population. 75% of residents in Upper Myanmar live in rural townships. 75% of the population in Upper Myanmar lives in Mandalay and Sagaing Regions, and Shan State.

State / Region	Urban	Rural	Total	%
Mandalay Region	2,143,436	4,022,287	6,165,723	26%
Shan State	1,395,847	4,428,585	5,824,432	25%
Sagaing Region	911,335	4,414,012	5,325,347	23%
Magway Region	588,031	3,329,024	3,917,055	17%
Kachin State	592,368	1,050,473	1,642,841	7%
Chin State	99,809	378,992	478,801	2%
Total	5,730,826	17,623,373	23,354,199	100%
