= Battle of Bhamo (2024) =

2024 battle in Kachin

- Part of the Kachin Theatre in the Myanmar civil war
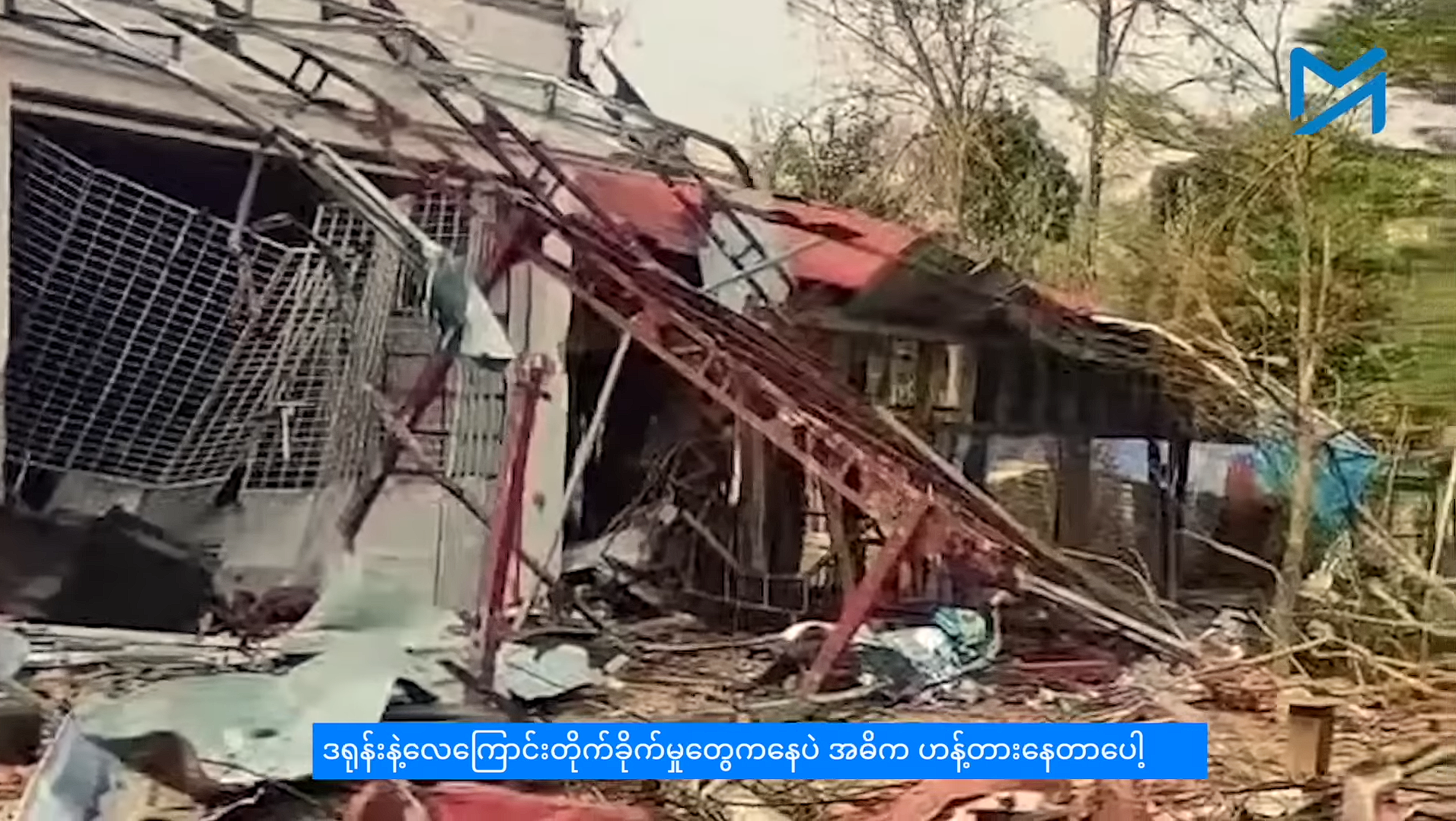
- Aerial bombardment damage in Bhamo, May 2025 (by Myanmar Now News)
Date	4 December 2024 – present (1 year, 2 months, 3 weeks and 6 days)
Location	Bhamo, Bhamo Township and Mansi Township
Result	Ongoing

Belligerents
Tatmadaw; Myanmar Air Force; Myanmar Police Force	Kachin Independence Army; All Burma Students' Democratic Front; People's Defense Force

Units involved
Tatmadaw: Military Operation Command 21; Light Infantry Division 88; Light Infantry Battalion 47, 121, 236, 237; Tank Battalion 5014; Armored Battalion 7006; Artillery Battalion 366	Kachin Independence Army: unknown; People's Defense Force

Casualties and losses
Tatmadaw: at least 100 injured (Note: While retreating from Mansi Township to Bhamo Township); many captured; seven armoured vehicles captured (Note: During the fight for Armored Battalion 7006 in Bhamo); some tanks destroyed (Note: During the fight for Tank Battalion 5014 in Bhamo); Two Mi-17 shot down	Kachin Independence Army Unknown, presumed heavy

On 4 December 2024 the Kachin Independence Army, All Burma Students Democratic Front and others Kachin-based resistance groups, launched an operation to capture Bhamo. The operation has targeted also Bhamo Township and Mansi Township. While losses seem heavy on both sides, thousands of civilians are trapped in the town under constant airstrikes, artillery and drone bombardment.

== Background ==
Bhamo is a city in Kachin State in northern Myanmar. It is on the Ayeyarwady River. It is the administrative center of Bhamo District and Bhamo Township. Bhamo is the location for the Myanmar military Junta's Military Operation Command-21, Light Infantry Battalion 47, 121, 236, and 237, along with one artillery battalion, armored corps, signal corps, military equipment unit, logistics unit, military engineering corps, and military medical corps. In Bhamo there is also an airport.

== Battle ==
=== Start of the battle (December 2024) ===
The Kachin Independence Army and its allies launched a military operation to capture Bhamo on December 4. By 25 December KIA captured Bhamo Technological University and a hilltop junta position. Many residents start fleeing the city by boat.

By December 27 the fighting for the town continues. 10,000 civilians are trapped in the town, while local sources report casualties on both KIA and Junta sides.

=== Concurrent operations in neighbouring Mansi (January 2025) ===
On January 8 the KIA captured all three battalion headquarters in neighboring Mansi Township: Light Infantry Battalion 319, Light Infantry Battalion 601, and Artillery Battalion 523. The commander of LIB 601 was also killed. Many junta soldiers surrendered, leading to the seizure of large piles of weapons and ammunition, according to local monitors. After the capture of Mansi by KIA and its allies, Bhamo is completely encircled: fierce fighting occurs around 21st Military Operations Command, Bhamo Airport, Tar Mong Lone ward, Infantry Battalion 47, and the university. The regime bombs the city daily with airstrikes, artillery bombardments, and drone.

After seizing the Mansi township on January 8, the KIA together with All Burma Students Democratic Front and other groups attacked hundreds of troops retreating from Mansi to Bhamo. Local sources estimate at least 100 retreating troops are injured, numerous Junta soldiers detained, and large amounts of arms and ammunition seized. On 16 January Bhamo residents reported that junta forces are limited to Military Operations Command 21 and Infantry Battalion 47, which are apparently being encircled by anti-regime forces.

=== KIA continues offensive (January–February 2025) ===
By 21 January, ongoing fighting in Bhamo consistently resulted in civilian casualties, including children. Only during December, at least 30 civilians had been killed, according to the Kachin Human Rights Watch (KHRW).

On 25 January the Kachin Independence Army and allied resistance forces seized the base of junta's Armored Battalion 7006, while also surrounding the headquarters of an artillery battalion. Seven armored vehicles were captured by resistance forces. On 26 January KIA and allied forces seized Bhamo Airport. Meanwhile, junta daily airstrikes continue. On 2 February, KIA forces captured Artillery Battalion 366, an advance which brings KIA forces closer to the MOC-21 base.

On 11 February KIA confirms the capture of Junta's Tank Battalion 5014. The battle occurred a few days before but it wasn't announced to avoid airstrikes by the Junta. Sources report some tanks on fire.

On 18 February the KIA and PDF seized the junta's Infantry Battalion 236 and retook Artillery Battalion 366. in Bhamo Township, Kachin State on Tuesday. They are now intensively attacking the junta's Military Operations Command 21, which regime forces are fiercely defending. Along with MOC-21, the KIA and allies are also attacking the township's remaining junta positions, which include Infantry Battalion 47, a military training school and an anti-aircraft artillery battalion.

=== Junta counteroffensive (February–April 2025) ===
At the end of February the junta launched a counteroffensive using soldiers, artillery drones and airstrikes. Homes and religious buildings became frequent targets of junta arson attacks. Both the Roman Catholic Church and St. Patrick's Cathedral in Bhamo Town suffered extensive fire damage. By March the junta had taken back many areas of the town from the KIA.

=== Ceasefire and renewed offensive (April 2025 - present) ===
After the end of a ceasefire declared after the 2025 Myanmar earthquake, on April 25 the Kachin Independence Army and allies have resumed attacks on regime bases in Bhamo, while the regime responds with airstrikes, according to Kachin media reports. The MOC-21's central sentry base had fallen but airstrikes have prevented further advances. The KIA and its allies have reportedly seized at least five junta positions in the town while reporting casualties. On April 28 Banmaw Scout Team reported that two of these positions were at a church and a school.

As of 29 April the Thiri Yadana Morning Market in Bhamo Town was set on fire by junta soldiers. By 30 April KIA succeeded to recapture almost all the areas lost in March, including a complex that was home to junta offices and some guard posts. Fighting still continues in the town at the Infantry Battalion 47 base, the Military Operations Command (MOC) 21 headquarters and on the Bhamo University campus.

By the 7 May KIA sources reveal that regime transport helicopters have been reinforcing the headquarters with Y12 and Y8 airplanes parachuting food and supplies every day as Junta troops are short of food and ammunition. As of the first week of May, up to 50 airstrikes are being conducted per day in the city, according to resistance sources.

On May 4, the regime sent around 60 reinforcements in three helicopters to Bhamo which led to junta counterattacks from 21 MOC, according to KIA's spokesperson Col Naw Bu. By 8 May KIA force penetrated the 21 MOC compound but faces several barriers to further progress. Daily clashes continue around the 21 MOC and Light Infantry Battalion 47 near Bhamo Prison and in Taminelone ward, where the 88th LID is deployed.

On 8 May, at least 15 civilians were killed and over 30 others injured when Myanmar Air Force launched an airstrike on Kanna Yeiktha Monastery, which was sheltering only civilians. Junta-controlled military facilities still in operation include the MOC-21 headquarters, and the camps of Infantry Battalion 47, Engineering Battalion 914, Supply and Transport Battalion 933, Military Battalion 11, and several battalions under LID 88.

At 13:00 of 20 May, the KIA shot down two out of three SAC's Mi-17 helicopters that were transporting reinforcements to the MOC-21. One crashed in the jungle 14 miles from Shwegu, on the left bank of the Irrawaddy River, killing all the soldiers on board, including a strategic commander. The other one made an emergency landing at Shwe Ku and fell sideways. The crash site were then reached by KIA soldiers of the 5th Brigade.

On 21 August 2026, a flotilla of 15 supply vessels departed Mandalay, seeking to reach Bhamo and deliver crucial supplies and reinforcements to the besieged Tatmadaw garrison.

On 2 September 2026, Tatmadaw troops and their families surrendered to the KIA after ships traveling on the Ayeyarwady River to Bhamo from Shwegu were attacked from late August.

By 3 September 2026, 8 of the 15 ships had been sunk by the Kachin Independence Army, with the remaining 7 successfully docking in Bhamo and delivering their reinforcements and cargo. However, after docking, 5 of the 7 vessels were subsequently sunk by the KIA.

== See also ==
- 2024 Kachin offensive
