= Xiandao =

Xiandao may refer to:

- Xiandao dialect, a dialect of the Achang language from Yingjiang County, Yunnan, China
- Xiandao (1032–1034), reign period of Emperor Jingzong of Western Xia
