= Taping River =

Taping Ta Hkaw Hka / Daying
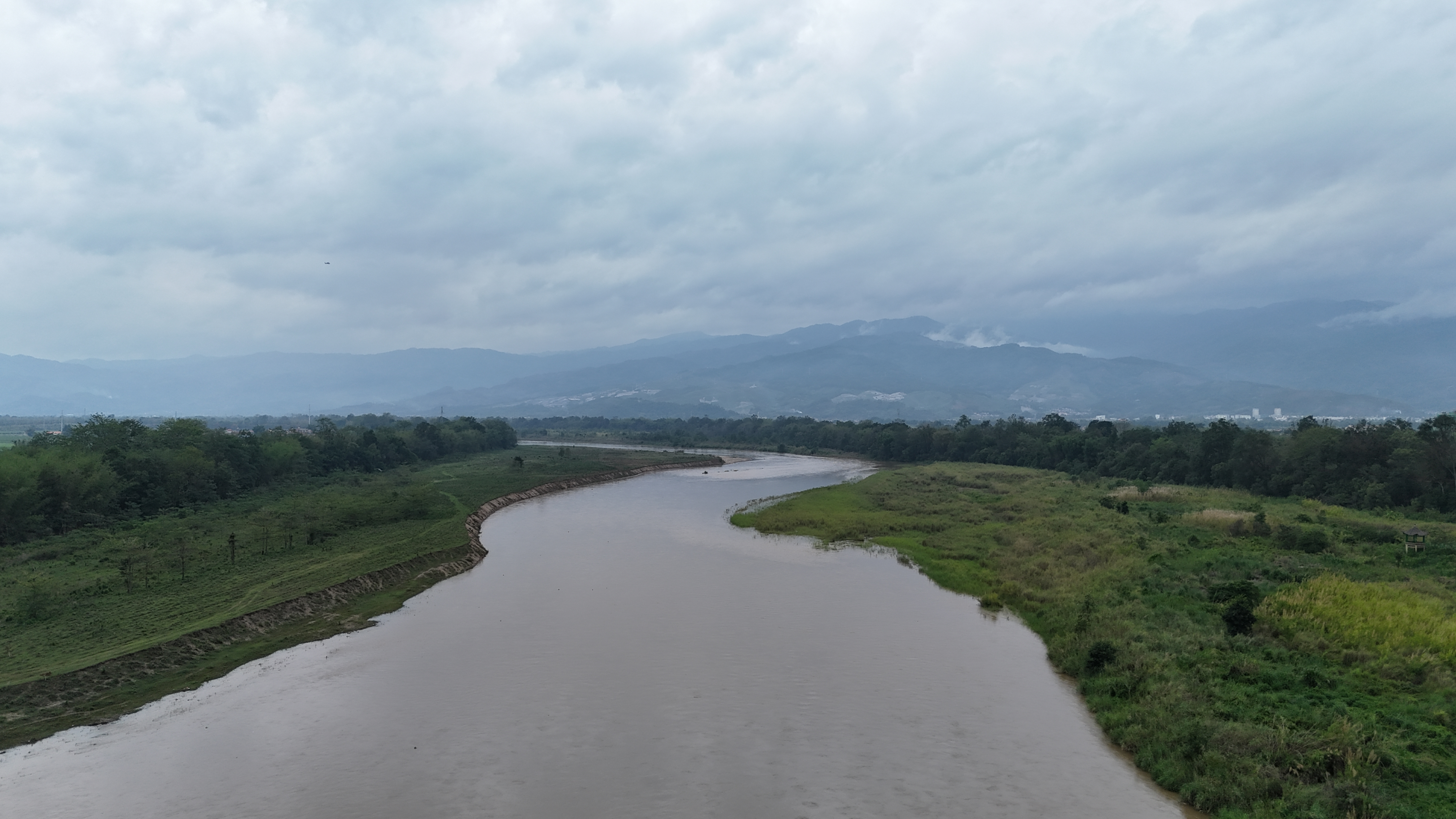
- Taping River at Yingjiang County, China

Location
- Country: Myanmar (Burma)

Physical characteristics
- Source
  - location: China
- Mouth
  - location: Ayeyarwady River
  - coordinates: 24°17′35″N 97°13′12″E
  - elevation: 103 m (338 ft)
- Length: 117 km (73 mi)
- Basin size: 7,053.2 km^{2} (2,723.3 sq mi)
- Discharge
  - location: Near mouth
  - average: 373.7 m^{3}/s (13,200 cu ft/s)

The Taping River (Chinese: 太平江; pinyin: Tàipíng Jiāng), known as Ta Hkaw Hka in Kachin and Daying River (Chinese: 大盈江; pinyin: Dàyíng Jiāng; Wade–Giles: Ta-ying Chiang) in Chinese, is a river in Yunnan province, China and northern Myanmar (Burma). It is the first tributary of the country's chief river, the Irrawaddy, and the watersheds between it and the N'mai Hka river to the northwest and the rivers Shweli and Salween to the southeast form part of the boundary between China and Myanmar. Its source lies in Yingjiang County of Yunnan, and it enters the Irrawaddy near Bhamo, Kachin State.

== History ==
In 1277 King Narathihapate of Bagan had an ambassador from Kublai Khan executed and then invaded the state of Kanngai along the Taping river, 70 miles north of Bhamo, for submitting to the Mongols. The Chinese defeated the Burmese in the Battle of Ngasaunggyan, a vivid account of which was reported back to Europe later by Marco Polo. The Chinese army advanced to Kaungsin but turned back because of excessive heat. They returned however in 1283, destroying Kaungsin and advancing into the Irrawaddy valley culminating in the fall of Bagan.

Trade with China had taken place along the Taping river for centuries through Kaungsin until Bhamo became more important from the 15th century onwards.

During the Second World War the Allies built the Ledo Road from India to China across northern Burma, and before Christmas 1944, completed 354 miles to reach Myothit on the Taping river in order to link up with the old Burma Road at Bhamo. American GIs in the road gang had pleasant recollections of their time along the river trading with locals for souvenirs and hunting in the jungle. Pontoon bridges were built by engineers across 10 major rivers including the Taping.

Earlier in the war, the Chinese 38th Division led by General Sun Li-Jen under the Northern Combat Area Command (NCAC) had fought the Japanese 56th Division along the Taping in a successful attempt at capturing Myothit in late October and subsequently driving the enemy out of their main defense positions in Bhamo, thus spearheading the drive in the construction of the Ledo Road.

== Flora and fauna ==
A rhinoceros was shot in 1946 after it had crossed the Irrawaddy and then the Taping river.

The Americans hunted sambar (deer), pheasants, and bear during the war, and a tame pet otter was traded for 2 boxes of matches.

The Irrawaddy dolphin has been known to enter the upper tributaries of the Irrawaddy including the Taping especially when the rivers are flooded. They were observed in the 19th century up to 30 km above Bhamo called "Dolphin Point". More recent surveys in 2002-2004 reported sightings in the deep pool area at the confluence of the Taping and the Irrawaddy, and up to 36 km upstream to Sinkan at the upstream end of the second defile of the Irrawaddy. Dam building upstream along the Taping is causing concerns as the reduced flow during the dry season could lead to loss of habitat and decline in their numbers.

== Development ==
Hydropower projects are under way in the region along the Taping, and 3 dams are being built - one on the Chinese side of the border, and 2 in Burma jointly by China Datang Corporation (CDT) and the Burmese military government namely Taping 1, 33 miles from Bhamo (240 MW), and Taping 2, 26 miles from Bhamo (168 MW).
