= Lweje =

Town in Kachin State, Myanmar

Lweje လွယ်ဂျယ်မြို့
- The boundary stone at Lweje

- Location in Myanmar
- Coordinates: 24°11′57″N 97°43′14″E
- Country: Myanmar
- State: Kachin State
- District: Bhamo District
- Township: Momauk Township

Population (2005)
  - Religions: Christianity Buddhism
- Time zone: UTC+6.30 (MMT)

Lweje (Burmese: လွယ်ဂျယ်မြို့; also spelt Loije or Lwegel, Chinese: 雷基; pinyin: Léijī) is a town in Kachin State in northeastern Burma, across the China-Myanmar border from Zhangfeng, in Longchuan County, Yunnan Province, China. It is one of five official border trade posts with China.

== History ==
The Kachin Independence Army captured Sein Lon Taung strategy hill of Military Council near Lweje, Moe Mauk Township on April 1 - 2024. After the occupation of the military's Sein Long Mountain base, Banmaw-Lweje road and Lweje town surrounding area became military council-free zone and KIA-led allied forces have complete control of Lweje town and the border gate.

== Transport ==
Border trade in the region has tripled since the upgrading of the dirt road connecting Lweje with Momauk, a distance of 76 km (47 mi), to a gravel road with Chinese assistance, was completed in December 2006. It has cut the journey time from Bhamo on the Ayeyarwady River to the border from nearly 10 hours to about 3 hours.

== Economy ==
The Lwezje border trade post with China opened on 23 August 1998. In 2022, total trade volume at the border post stood at US$122.76 million.

Exports to China include fruit, beans, rice and onions, while electronics, textiles and foodstuffs are imported. The volume of trade however is much smaller compared with Muse in Shan State where up to 75% of exports to Yunnan passes through to Ruili across the Shweli River.

After the then ruling military regime negotiated ceasefire agreements with the United Wa State Army (UWSA) and the New Democratic Army - Kachin (NDA-K) in 1989, and with the Kachin Independence Organization (KIO) in 1994, a boom in the timber trade with China followed. Earlier logging concessions granted to Thai companies were cancelled in 1993 due to economic loss from violation of terms and over-logging with ecological devastation.

Northern Kachin State became the area for most of the logging activity mainly by Chinese companies employing Chinese labour, and Lweje, along with Laiza, one of the checkpoints on the border. KIO logging activities also increased dramatically when after the cease-fire deal it lost control of the Hpakant jade mines and the revenue they had generated. From 1997 to 2002, 88% of China's timber exports from Burma was shipped overland to Yunnan, 75% of this from Kachin State.

There are believed to exist large deposits of coal in the Lweje area.

== Crime ==
Human trafficking of women into China is a problem the two countries are trying to tackle and anti-trafficking offices were opened on 22 December 2008 in both Lweje and Jiang Phong.

== Religion ==
During September–October 2007 at the time of the Saffron Revolution, Buddhist monasteries were surrounded and locked down at Lweje by the military as in many other parts of the country.

Centenary celebrations of the American Baptist Mission were held for 3 days at Lweje at the end of December 2008.
