= Ze Hkaung =

Burmese politician

Ze Hkawng

Member of the Amyotha Hluttaw
- Incumbent
- Assumed office 3 February 2016
- Constituency: Kachin State № 3

Personal details
- Born: 7 September 1981 (age 45) Waingmaw, Myanmar
- Party: National League for Democracy
- Spouse: Khin Lin Mar
- Children: Hkaung Lwan
- Parent(s): Lwan Ze (father); Bawm Nam (mother)
- Education: Myitkyina University (B.Sc Botany)

Ze Hkaung (Burmese: ဇယ်ခေါင်, born 7 September 1981) is a Burmese politician who currently serves as an Amyotha Hluttaw MP for Kachin State No. 3 constituency. He is a member of the National League for Democracy.

== Early life and education ==
Ze Hkaung was born on 7 September 1981 in Waingmaw Township, Kachin State, Myanmar. He is an ethnic Lhaovo. He graduated with B.Sc (Botany) from Myitkyina University. In 2012, he became NLD member. From 2012 to 2015, he had served township campaign.

== Political career ==
He is a member of the National League for Democracy. In the 2015 Myanmar general election, he was elected as an Amyotha Hluttaw MP, winning a majority of 12353 votes and elected representative from Kachin State No. 3 parliamentary constituency. He worked as chairman of automobile association.
