= Pat Jasan =

Controversial antidrug movement in Myanmar

Pat Jasan is an anti-drug organisation founded in 2014 in Kachin State Myanmar. The organisation has been described as "vigilantes", "an ethnic Kachin public movement", "militant christians" a "civilian movement" and Myanmar's "largest civilian uprising in nearly a decade".

== Membership ==
The organisation originated from the Kachin Baptist Convention and Catholic Churches in Kachin State and current membership is around 100,000 individuals.

== Activities ==
=== Rehabilitation ===
Pat Jasan have rehabilitation centres in Kachin and Shan State, numbering at least 28 From 2014 to 2016 the group claimed to have taken in over 10,470 individuals addicted to drugs (559 women and 9891 men) and cured over 7000 of them through the camps.

=== Flogging ===
The group have been known to flog drug users.

=== Poppy destruction ===
The group conduct poppy field destruction activities in Kachin State, which has led to stand-offs with Burmese Security forces. Pat Jasan claimed to have cleared 2500 acres and 1500 of Poppies, in 2015 and 2016 respectively.

==== Waingmaw standoff ====
In early 2016, a standoff occurred between members of Pat Jasan who were planning to destroy poppies Waingmaw, Burmese security forces and farmers. On January 20, Pat Jasan members formally requested security from the Kachin State government for their planned eradication efforts and met with the state minister of border affairs. Following this, the group were given permission and a security force from local police. On February 3, 200 Pat Jasan members, 70 soldiers and 30 police travelled to the Sadaung-Kambaiti area of Waingmaw. On February 4, Pat Jasan members were attacked by around 250 locals.

After being informed that roughly 1000 armed farmers were waiting for them in the Sadaung-Kambaiti area of Waingmaw township, Pat Jasan called a temporary halt to their eradication effort, on grounds of safety. By mid February around 1200 Pat Jasan activists had camped at Naungmaw village, but as they tried to move to Kambaiti and Sadon on February 16 they were blocked by military and police for security reasons.

By February 24, the numbers of Pat Jasan activists were around 2400 and they re-launched their campaign to eradicate poppies, with 200 members of the security forces including police, firemen and military troops protecting them. The eradication campaign led to outbreaks of violence from armed farmers.
