= Xiandao dialect =

Endangered Achang language of Yunnan, China

Xiandao
- 仙岛
- Chintau
- Pronunciation: [kʰan31 tau31]
- Region: Yunnan, China
- Ethnicity: Xiandao (officially Achang)
- Native speakers: (undated figure of ≈ 40–70)
- Language family: Sino-Tibetan: Burmo-Qiangic?; Lolo-Burmese; Burmish; Southern; Achang; Longchuan; Xiandao

Language codes
- ISO 639-3: xia (deprecated, merged into acn in 2012)
- Glottolog: xian1249
- ELP: Xiandao; Xiandao

The Xiandao language (Xiandao: Chintau [kʰan³¹tau³¹]; Chinese: 仙岛) is an endangered Burmish language spoken by the Xiandao people who live at the border area between Myanmar and Yunnan, China. It is closely related to the Achang language and is considered by many scholars to be an Achang dialect, due to similarities in syntax and vocabulary. This is one way in which Xiandao can be described. The second is as an independent language due to the social and cultural differences between the Xiandao and Achang people.

== Classification ==
Xiandao is a minority language spoken in Yingjiang County, Yunnan Province, China near the border of Myanmar. Despite technically being in China, the language emerged from Burmish languages and has few Sinitic qualities. It is a part of the Burmish Tibeto-Burmese language family. The Xiandao people were included in China's unclassified national minority category until 1980 when they became classified as a part of the Achang nationality. Generally, Xiandao is considered to be a dialect of Achang. However, the Xiandao community considers themselves separate from the Achang people.

=== History ===
This group was previously located in the mountains of the China-Myanmar border. In 1958, the Chinese government assisted six families in moving down from the harsh mountainous region to the nearby village of Meng'er. The government helped move the remaining ten families to Mangmian village in 1998. The Xiandao community is considered to be one of the poorest and most primitive groups in Yingjiang County. The members of this group traditionally relied on making bamboo cushions and wage labor for livelihood. The Xiandao community in Mangmian has been primarily Christian since 1993. A church was built in 1995 and service is conducted in Jingpo.

There is no Chinese historical record of the Xiandao people. According to local legend, the Xiandao were a group that were left behind when the rest of their group migrated to a new place. They realized that they were too far behind to catch up, and settled in Yingjiang. In the beginning, they had a large population that was decimated by smallpox epidemics. Due to linguistic similarities, it is believed that the Xiandao were originally a part of the Achang ethnic group living in Husa and Lasa. After long separation, they have developed a culture of their own, with differences in marriage tradition, religious practice, and customs. Because of their cultural differences, the Xiandao people believe that they are different from the Achang despite their official status.

=== Distribution ===
The language is spoken in two villages in Jiemao Township, Yingjiang County, Yunnan Province:

- Mangmian
- Meng'er

== Status ==
The Xiandao language is currently endangered. All Xiandao speakers know Standard Chinese, and many also speak Jingpo. Most community members are bilingual or trilingual. Children attend a local semi-boarding school where they learn in Standard Chinese along with children of Dai, Jingpo, and Han Chinese descent. The language appears to be more well-kept in Mangmian than Meng'er.

== Phonology ==
The Xiandao language consists of 40 initials, 65 rimes, and 4 tones. It has three more initials than Achang. Due to the current lack of documentation of Xiandao, phonological information may be incomplete.

=== Consonants ===
There are 15 consonants, a voiceless alveolo-palatal fricative (sometimes used in oral languages), and a glottal stop present in Xiandao. The plosives /p/, /t/, and /k/ all have aspirated allophones and along with [m] and [ŋ] can all be combined with a retroflex. Devoicing of consonants is also common. This non-exhaustive list does not include all possible sound variations of Xiandao consonants.

	Bilabial	Labiodental	Alveolar	Retroflex	Palatal	Velar	Glottal
Plosive	p		t			k	ʔ
Nasal	m		n			ŋ	
Fricative		f v	s	ʂ ʐ		x	
Lateral fricative			ɬ				
Approximant			l		j		

=== Vowels ===
The Xiandao language has approximately 8 vowels, 4 possible diphthongs and one triphthong: [ai], [oi], [ui], [au] and [iau].

Monophthongs
	Front	Back	
	Front	unrounded	rounded
Close	i	ɯ	u
Close-mid		ɤ	o
Open-mid	ɛ		ɔ
Open	a		

=== Tones ===
Xiandao has four tones: high level /˦/, high rising /˦˥/, low falling /˨˥˩/, and high falling /˦˥˩/. In non-IPA transcriptions, they are written as ⟨55⟩, ⟨35⟩, ⟨31⟩ and ⟨51⟩, respectively. This system is shared with the Achang language.

== Orthography ==
The Xiandao language does not have its own writing system, but rather relies on rich oral traditions such as storytelling, song, and word of mouth to communicate and keep traditions and practices alive. When the Xiandao need to read, they can read in Chinese or Jingpo.

== Lexicon ==
Because of a lack of documentation and shared information of the Xiandao language, there are not many records of Xiandao words. A few commonly used words are listed below.

English	Xiandao
Man	juʔ˨˥˩ ɕɛ˦
Who	xau˦
Mountain	pum˦
Dog	fui˨˥˩
Bear	om˦
Good	ɕɛ˦
Wolf	pum˦ fui˨˥˩
Thunder	mau˨˥˩ cau˨˥˩

The Xiandao language has the ability to create compound words. As seen above, the word for “wolf” (/pum˦ fui˨˥˩/) is a combination of “mountain” (/pum˦/) and “dog” (/fui˨˥˩/).

=== Loanwords ===
The Xiandao language borrows many words from its neighboring languages such as Achang, Dai, Jingpo, and Chinese. This is the case because the Xiandao language lacks words for abstracts like hope, fame, sorrow, as well as descriptions like careful, proud, and brave. Additionally, words for non-traditional tools like shovel, glue and drill are not present and must be borrowed.
