= Myitkyina University =

University in Myanmar

Coordinates: 25°25′2″N 97°24′40″E

Myitkyina University is a university in northern Myitkyina, Myanmar.

Since 1996, on-campus student housing has been banned. However, there were plans to reopen two residence halls in 2013: Hkakaborazi (to house 120 male students) and Sumprabum (to house 128 female students).

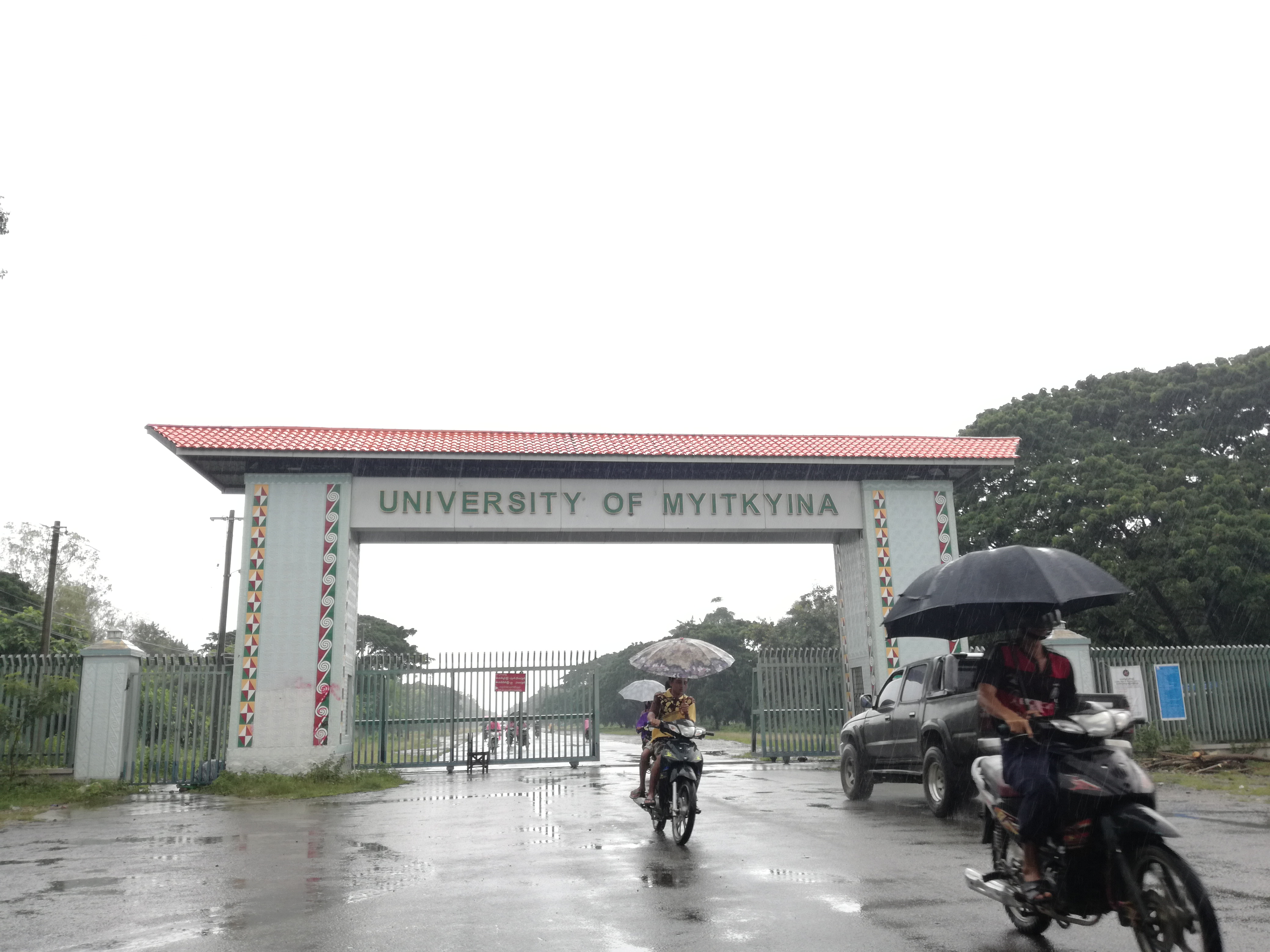
Myitkyina University

== Notable alumni ==
- Ze Hkaung - politician

== See also ==
- Mohnyin University
