= Yingjiang County =

Yingjiang County 盈江县
- County

Other transcription(s)
  - Pinyin: Yíngjiāng Xiàn
  - Tai Nuea: ᥔᥦᥢᥱ ᥛᥫᥒᥰ ᥘᥣᥲ
  - Jingpho: Yinkyang Ginwang
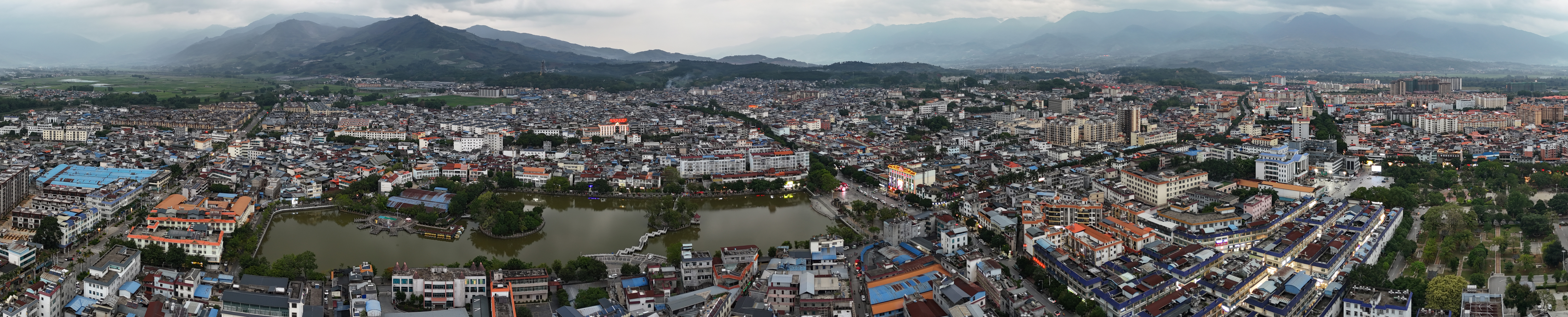
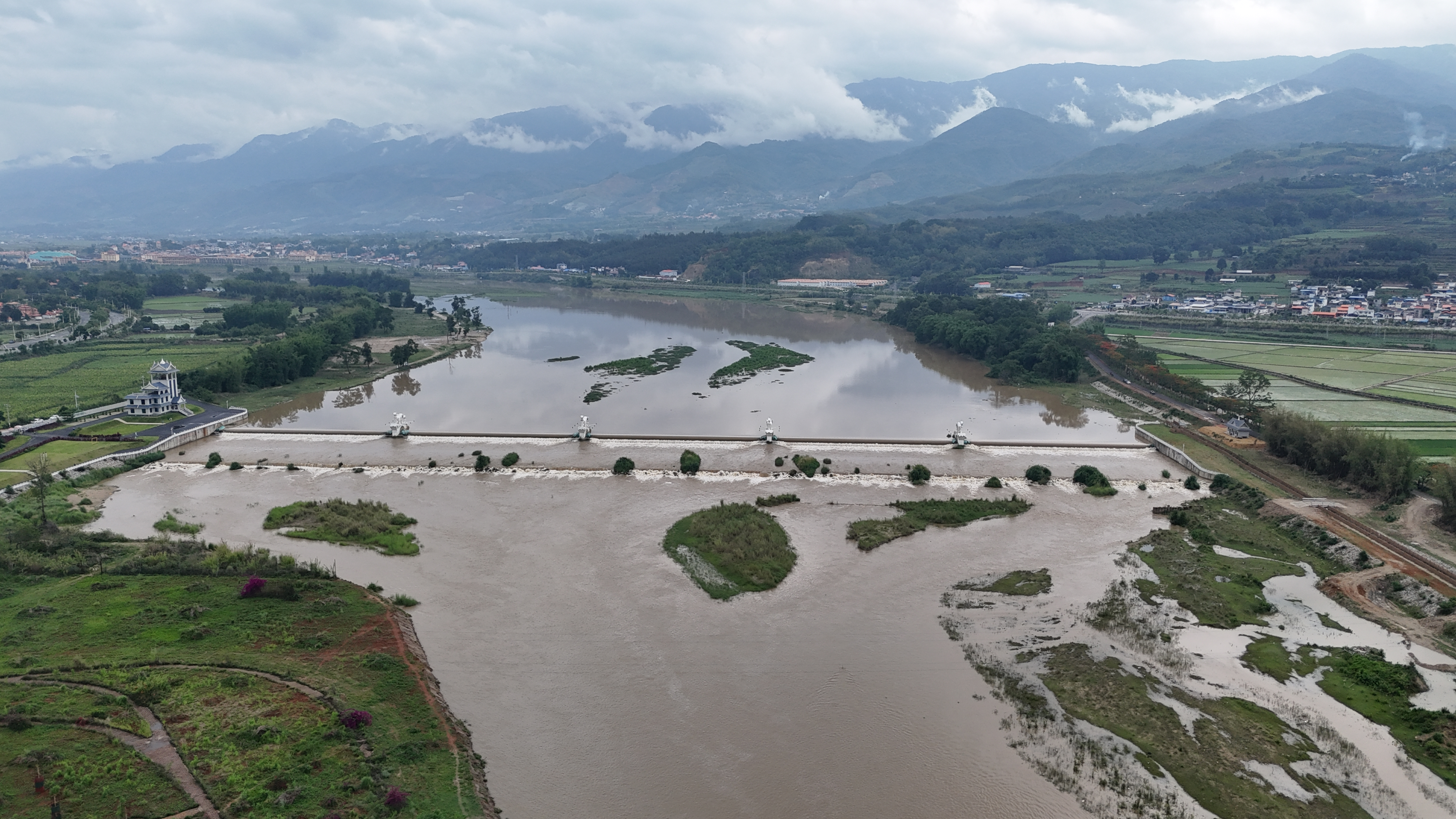
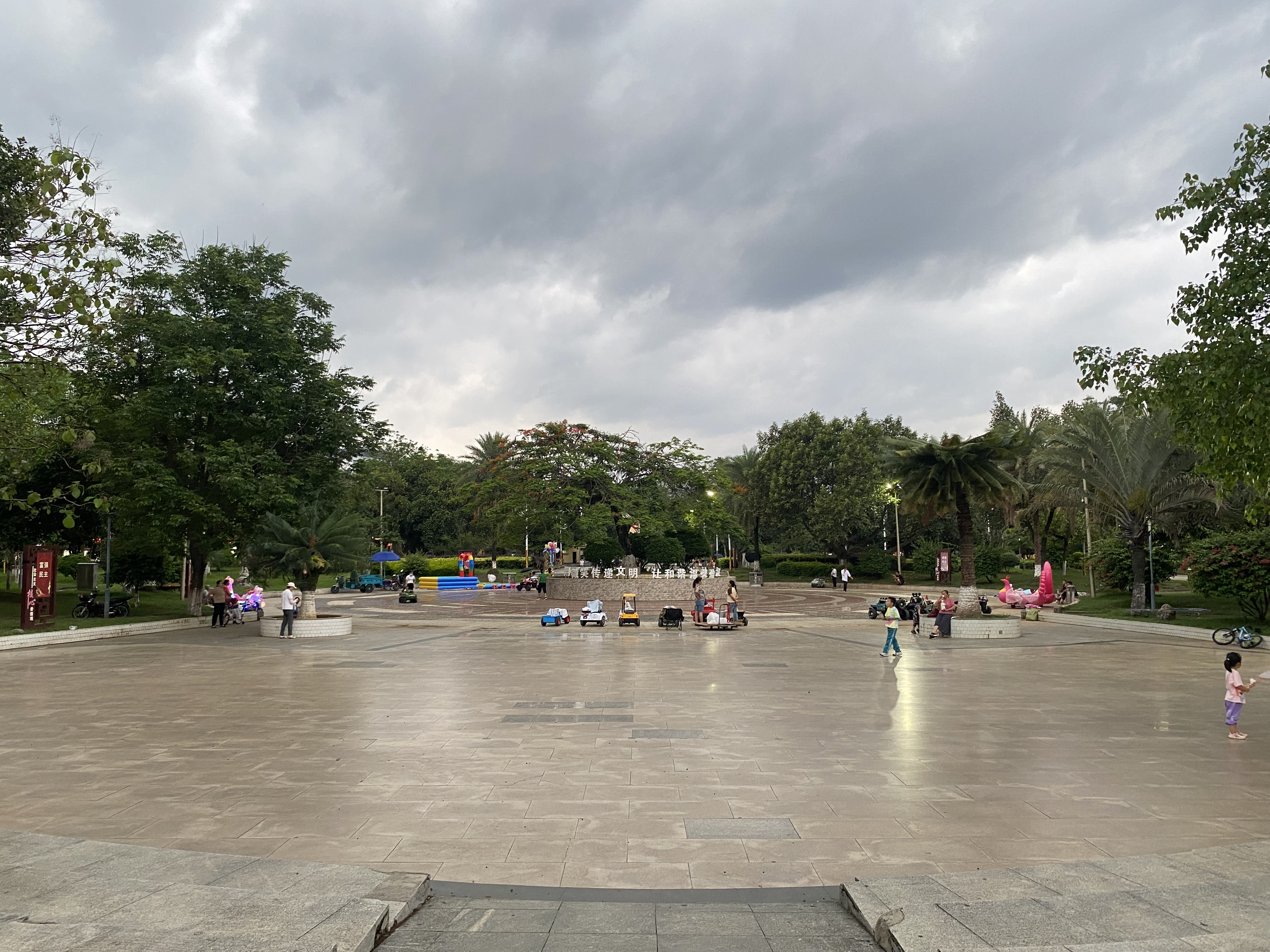
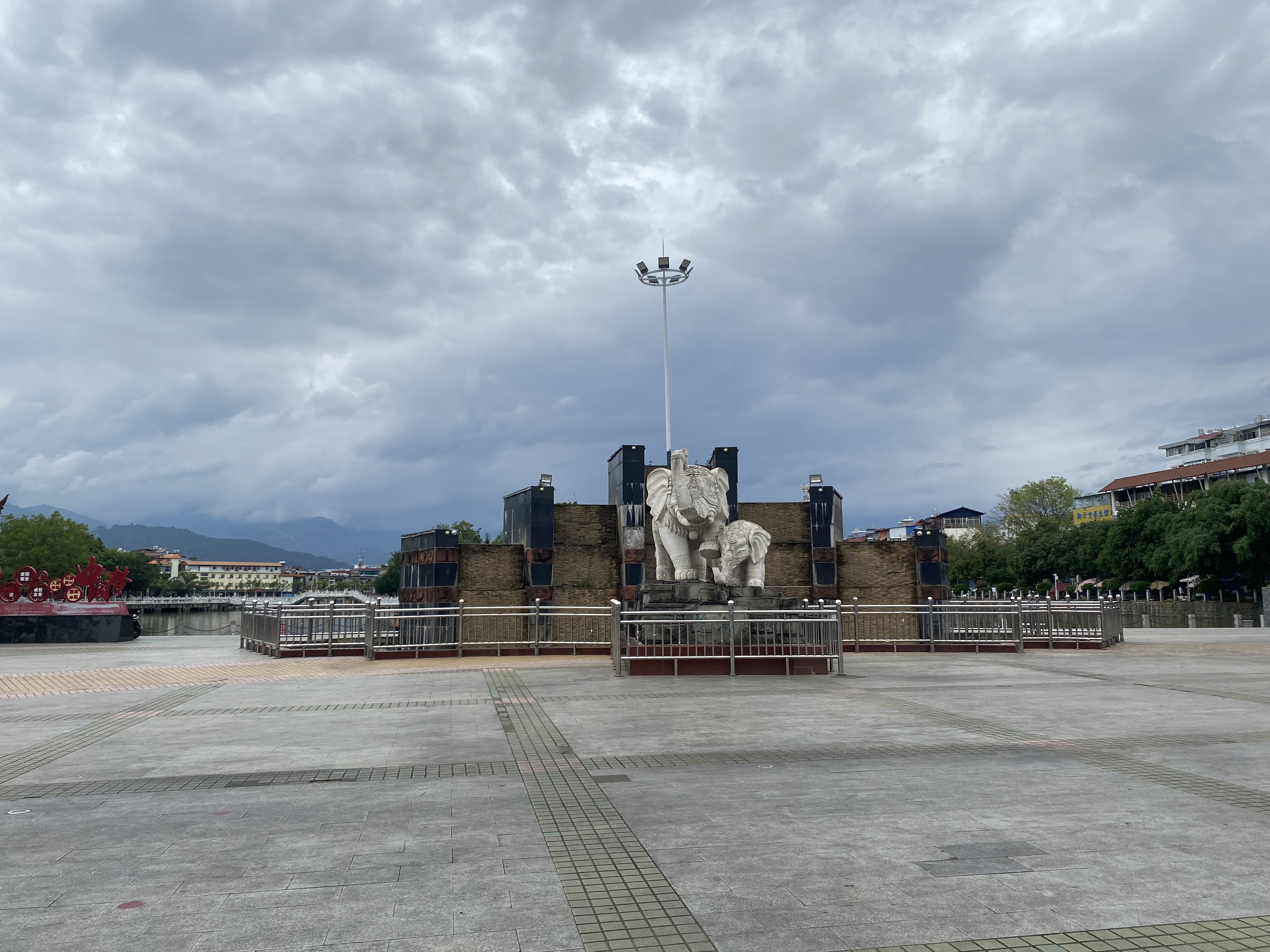
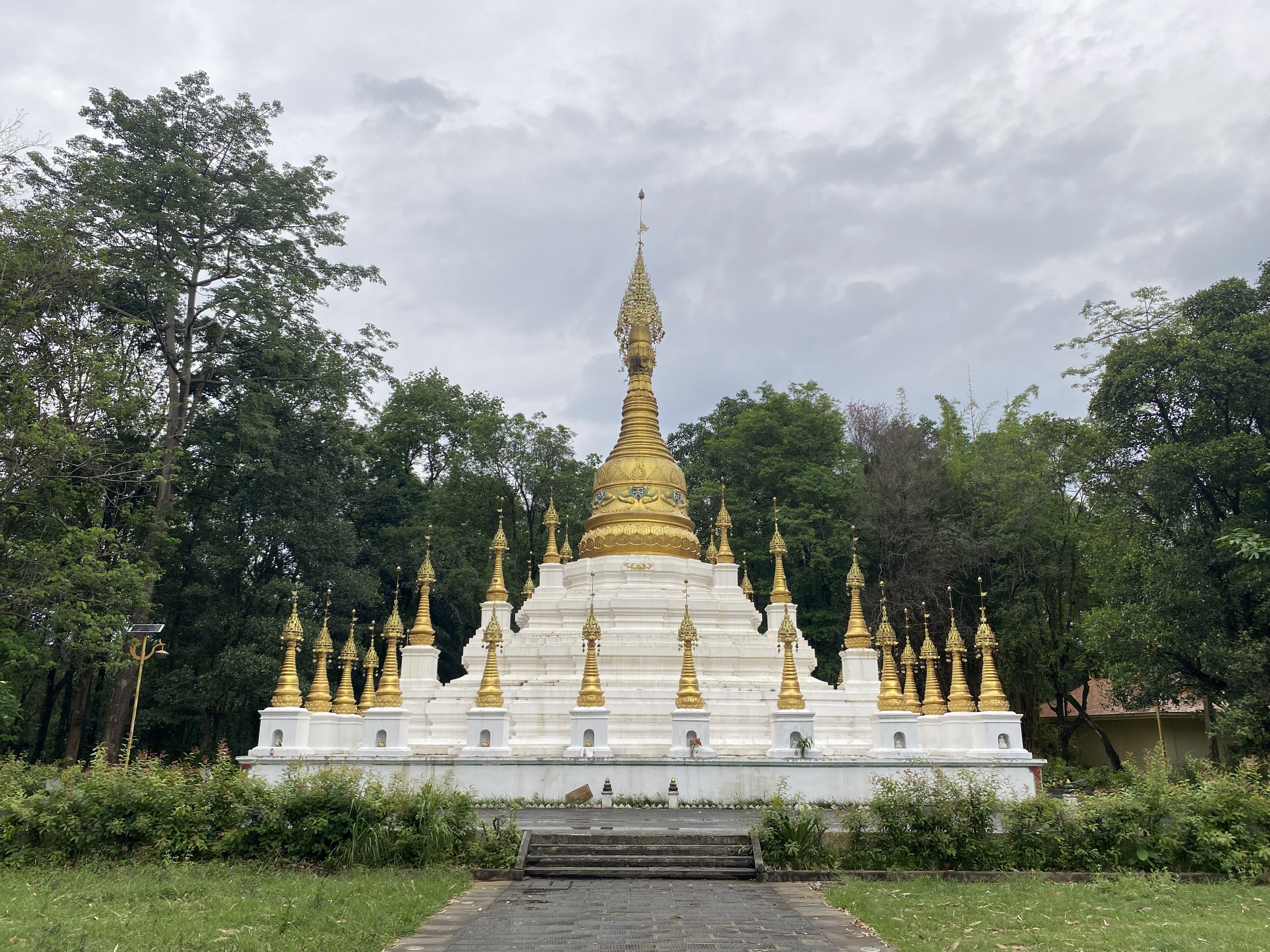
- Cityscape of county town Taping River Yingjiang Square Yinghu Park Vëeng Qĕhng Stupa

- Location of Yingjiang County in Dehong Prefecture within Yunnan

- Location in Yunnan
- Coordinates: 24°42′30″N 97°55′48″E
- Country: China
- Province: Yunnan
- Autonomous prefecture: Dehong
- County seat: Pingyuan

Area
  - Total: 4,429 km^{2} (1,710 sq mi)

Population (2020 census)
  - Total: 292,508
  - Density: 66.04/km^{2} (171.1/sq mi)
- Postal code: 679300
- Area code: 0692
- Website: www.dhyj.gov.cn

Yingjiang County (simplified Chinese: 盈江县; traditional Chinese: 盈江縣; pinyin: Yíngjiāng Xiàn; Tai Nüa: ᥔᥦᥢᥱ ᥛᥫᥒᥰ ᥘᥣᥲ; Jingpho: Yinkyang Ginwang; Thai: เมืองหล้า) is a county in Dehong Prefecture, Yunnan province, China, bordering Tengchong to the east, Lianghe County to the southeast, Longchuan County to the south and Burma's Kachin State to the west.

== Geography ==
Yingjiang county has a border of 214.6 km (133.3 mi) with Kachin State, Myanmar in the west. The Danzha River (Chinese: 胆扎河; pinyin: Dǎnzhá Hé) and Binglang River (Chinese: 槟榔江; pinyin: Bīngláng Jiāng) meet near Jiucheng (Chinese: 舊城; pinyin: Jiùchéng) and become the Daying River (Dàyíngjiāng). The Daying then flows through Yingjiang County into Myanmar and into the Irrawaddy River, with the confluence near Bhamo. The Daying is known as the Taping (大平江; Dàpíng Jiāng) in Myanmar.

Yingjiang county is mountainous with several alluvial plains. The county has various climate types, with ranges from the tropical, the subtropical, to the temperate zones. Intact forests can be seen in the mountains above 2,000 m (6,600 ft). The elevations vary from 210 to 3,404.6 m (689 to 11,170 ft).

Yingjiang is abundant in hydroelectric, forest, and geothermal resources. There are 21 hot springs, six of which are above 90 °C (194 °F). Most of the hot springs are distributed within the Daying River system.

The county is within a very active seismic zone, and have been struck in 2008, 2009 and 2011 by violent earthquakes.

== Climate ==
Climate data for Yingjiang, elevation 827 m (2,713 ft), (1991–2020 normals, extremes 1981–2025)
Month	Jan	Feb	Mar	Apr	May	Jun	Jul	Aug	Sep	Oct	Nov	Dec	Year
Record high °C (°F)	26.7 (80.1)	31.2 (88.2)	34.1 (93.4)	36.0 (96.8)	36.1 (97.0)	34.9 (94.8)	34.0 (93.2)	35.1 (95.2)	35.3 (95.5)	34.2 (93.6)	31.5 (88.7)	26.7 (80.1)	36.1 (97.0)
Mean daily maximum °C (°F)	22.2 (72.0)	24.4 (75.9)	27.8 (82.0)	29.8 (85.6)	29.6 (85.3)	28.7 (83.7)	28.0 (82.4)	28.9 (84.0)	29.3 (84.7)	28.1 (82.6)	25.6 (78.1)	22.9 (73.2)	27.1 (80.8)
Daily mean °C (°F)	12.8 (55.0)	15.0 (59.0)	18.6 (65.5)	21.7 (71.1)	23.6 (74.5)	24.3 (75.7)	24.2 (75.6)	24.5 (76.1)	23.9 (75.0)	21.8 (71.2)	17.5 (63.5)	13.9 (57.0)	20.2 (68.3)
Mean daily minimum °C (°F)	6.5 (43.7)	8.2 (46.8)	11.8 (53.2)	15.6 (60.1)	19.2 (66.6)	21.6 (70.9)	21.9 (71.4)	22.0 (71.6)	20.9 (69.6)	17.9 (64.2)	12.3 (54.1)	8.1 (46.6)	15.5 (59.9)
Record low °C (°F)	−0.8 (30.6)	1.0 (33.8)	2.6 (36.7)	8.2 (46.8)	13.4 (56.1)	16.7 (62.1)	16.3 (61.3)	18.3 (64.9)	15.1 (59.2)	8.7 (47.7)	3.9 (39.0)	1.6 (34.9)	−0.8 (30.6)
Average precipitation mm (inches)	21.3 (0.84)	19.9 (0.78)	24.6 (0.97)	64.0 (2.52)	156.6 (6.17)	322.7 (12.70)	329.7 (12.98)	240.5 (9.47)	157.8 (6.21)	109.9 (4.33)	30.7 (1.21)	8.1 (0.32)	1,485.8 (58.5)
Average precipitation days (≥ 0.1 mm)	3.2	4.5	5.6	10.4	17.4	23.9	25.9	22.6	17.4	13.1	4.5	2.0	150.5
Average relative humidity (%)	74	68	63	65	74	84	87	85	84	81	78	77	77
Mean monthly sunshine hours	247.8	225.1	239.9	224.6	189.3	112.2	89.5	123.4	148.8	186.8	233.4	250.8	2,271.6
Percentage possible sunshine	74	70	64	59	46	28	22	31	41	53	72	76	53
Source: China Meteorological Administration

== History ==
Yingjiang county became part of Chinese territory for the first time in the Western Han dynasty. It was under control of Yizhou Prefecture (益州郡) (Yìzhōu jùn) in the Western Han dynasty. During the Eastern Han, the Shu Han, the Western Jin, and the Eastern Jin, it was governed by Ailao county (哀牢縣) (Āiláo xiàn), Yongchang Prefecture (永昌郡) (Yǒngchāng jùn), and then by Xicheng county (西城縣) (Xīchéng xiàn) from the Southern Qi dynasty in 479.

From the 320s, the Cuan (爨) (Cuàn) family began to control Yunnan. China was very unstable during the Northern and Southern Dynasties, and the central governments had no force to control Yunnan. The Cuan family took the strategy by which they recognized the nominal sovereignty of the central governments while remaining themselves as the real local rulers. In this way, the Cuan family had controlled Yunnan for more than 400 years until it was conquered by Nanzhao in 769.

Yingjiang was ruled by Nanzhao and later by Dali from the 8th to the 13th century and hence was not governed by China during the Tang dynasty and the Song dynasty. It was conquered by the Mongols and again became part of the Chinese territory. During the Ming dynasty and the Qing dynasty, Yingjiang was governed by local chiefs under the "Tusi system" (土司制度) (Tǔsī Zhìdù), i.e. the Native Chieftain system, in which the central government had the nominal sovereignty.

== Administrative divisions ==
Yingjiang County has 8 towns, 6 townships and 1 ethnic township.

8 towns

- Pingyuan (平原镇)
- Jiucheng (旧城镇)
- Nabang (那邦镇)
- Nongzhang (弄璋镇)
- Zhanxi (盏西镇)
- Kachang (卡场镇)
- Xima (昔马镇)
- Taiping (太平镇)

6 townships

- Xincheng (新城乡)
- Yousongling (油松岭乡)
- Mangzhang (芒章乡)
- Zhina (支那乡)
- Mengnong (勐弄乡)
- Tongbiguan (铜壁关乡)

1 ethnic township

- Sudian Lisu Ethnic Township (苏典傈僳族乡)

== Sights ==
- Yunyan Pagoda (允燕塔)(Yǔnyàn Tǎ).

A great flood occurred in Yingjiang in 1946. For Buddha's blessing, a pagoda was proposed. The construction of Yuyan Pagoda began in 1947 and was completed in 1952. The Yuyan Pagoda was built on Ertaipo (二台坡)(Èrtáipō), Yuyan Mountain (允燕山)(Yǔnyàn Shān), 2 km (1.2 mi) east of the Pingyuan Township (平原鎮)(Píngyuán Zhèn), where the county seat resides.

- Hutiaoshi (虎跳石)(Hǔtiàoshí)

Once several hundred meters wide, the Daying River is narrowed to only 7 to 8 m (23 to 26 ft) wide when passing through Hutiaoshi. With the waterfall and the steep cliffs, Hutiaoshi is a famous attraction.

- Tongbiguan Natural Protection Area (銅壁關自然保護區)(Tóngbìguān Zìrán Bǎohùqū) The Protection Area has some seasonal tropical forest.

The Tongbiguan Natural Protection Area was established in 1986. With an area of 341.6 square kilometres (131.9 sq mi), it covers part of Yingjiang and Longchuan counties as well as Ruili city. The vegetation in the area displays an obvious vertical distribution. The Tongbiguan Natural Protection Area offers a shelter to many rare or endangered species.

== See also ==
- Trimeresurus yingjiangensis, the Yingjiang green pitviper, a snake species named after Yingjiang
