= Xima, Yunnan =

Xima 昔马镇
- Town
- Location in Yunnan
- Coordinates: 24°45′29″N 97°42′2″E
- Country: People's Republic of China
- Province: Yunnan
- Autonomous prefecture: Dehong Dai and Jingpo Autonomous Prefecture
- County: Yingjiang County
- Time zone: UTC+8 (China Standard)

Xima (simplified Chinese: 昔马; traditional Chinese: 昔馬; pinyin: Xīmǎ) is a town under the administration of Yingjiang County, Yunnan, China. As of 2018, it has three villages under its administration.
