= Trimeresurus yingjiangensis =

Scientific classification
- Kingdom: Animalia
- Phylum: Chordata
- Class: Reptilia
- Order: Squamata
- Suborder: Serpentes
- Family: Viperidae
- Genus: Trimeresurus
- Species: T. yingjiangensis

Binomial name
- Trimeresurus yingjiangensis Chen, Zhang, Shi, Tang, Guo, Song & Ding, 2019

Species of snake

Trimeresurus yingjiangensis, also known as Yingjiang green pitviper, is a species of pit viper. It is endemic to Yunnan in southwest China. It is named after its type locality, Yingjiang County.
