= Jiucheng, Yingjiang County =

Jiucheng 旧城镇
- Town
- Location in Yunnan
- Coordinates: 24°44′44″N 98°04′28″E
- Country: People's Republic of China
- Province: Yunnan
- Autonomous prefecture: Dehong
- County: Yingjiang
- Elevation: 858 m (2,815 ft)
- Time zone: UTC+8 (China Standard)

Jiucheng (simplified Chinese: 旧城; traditional Chinese: 舊城; pinyin: Jiùchéng; lit. 'old city') is a town in Yingjiang County in western Yunnan province, China, located (as the crow flies) around 15 kilometres (9.3 mi) east-northeast of the county seat, which is in the same valley as Jiucheng itself, and 60 km (37 mi) northwest of Mangshi. As of 2018, it has six villages under its administration.
