= 2008 Yingjiang earthquakes =

2008 earthquakes centered on the China-Myanmar border in Yingjiang, Yunnan, China

- Location within Yunnan
- UTC time: 2008-08-21 12:24:32
- ISC event: 13392944
- USGS-ANSS: ComCat
- Local date: 20 August–3 September 2008
- Local time
- Magnitude: 5.9 M_{s} 6.0 M_{w}
- Depth: 10 km (6.2 mi)
- Epicenter: 24.9°N 97.8°E (Yingjiang, Yunnan)
- Areas affected: China; Myanmar
- Max. intensity: CSIS VIII
- Casualties: 5 dead, 130 injured

The 2008 Yingjiang earthquakes were a series of major earthquakes ranging from surface-wave magnitude (M_{s}) 4.1 to 5.9 that struck Yingjiang County, Yunnan province, China between August 19 (in UTC; August 20 local time) and September 3. It caused 5 deaths, 130 injuries (21 of which were serious), and RMB 2.7 billion in direct economic damage. USGS put the magnitude of the strongest one to M_{w} 6.0.

== Earthquake ==
According to the China Earthquake Administration (CEA) and its subordinate China Earthquake Network Center (CENC), a M_{s} 5.0 earthquake struck Yingjiang County, Yunnan province, China on August 20, 2008, at 05:35:09 China Standard Time (CST – 2135 UTC, August 19, 2008). A CEA report published on September 17 described two additional strong quakes of M_{s} 4.9 and M_{s} 5.9 in the same area the following day; CENC's data base, on the other hand, did not include the earthquake of M_{s} 4.9 at 20:20 CST on August 21 as the CEA report described, but reveals additional ones after the date.

=== Sequence of earthquakes ===
#	CST	UTC	Place	Lat.	Long.	M_{s}
1	2008-08-20 05:35:09	2008-08-19 21:35:09	Yingjiang, Yunnan	25.1	97.9	5.0
2	2008-08-21 20:20	2008-08-21 12:20	Yingjiang, Yunnan	25.1	97.9	4.9
3	2008-08-21 20:24:32	2008-08-21 12:24:32	Yingjiang, Yunnan	25.1	97.9	5.9
4	2008-08-22 20:06:14	2008-08-22 12:35:09	Yingjiang, Yunnan	25.0	97.9	4.7
5	2008-09-03 02:59:18	2008-09-02 18:59:18	Yingjiang, Yunnan	24.9	97.9	4.1
6	2008-09-03 14:27:20	2008-09-03 06:27:20	Yingjiang, Yunnan	24.9	97.9	4.8

Note: Earthquakes #4 and after are not included in CEA summary; earthquake #2 is unaccounted for in CENC data base.

== Impact ==
=== Casualties ===
According to CEA, these earthquakes caused 5 deaths and 21 others were seriously hurt, as well as 109 minor injuries. Through the Yunnan Earthquake Administration (YNEA), the provincial government invoked Level IV emergence response protocol in the relief. The number of affected people is said to be around 210,000, roughly 2/3 of the total population in the affected areas. Direct financial damage amounted to RMB 1.3 billion. In addition to building damage, the heaviest infrastructure damage occurred to water resources facilities.

=== Intensity ===
On the seismic intensity map published by CEA, maximum intensity of these earthquakes reached liedu VIII on China seismic intensity scale (CSIS), which is somewhat equivalent to VIII (Severe) on the MMI and from which CSIS drew reference. Liedu-VIII zone spans 26 km^{2} near the epicenter. Total area of liedu VI (Slightly damaging) and above is a north–south oval of 4,511 km^{2}.

== See also ==
- List of earthquakes in 2008
- List of earthquakes in Myanmar
- List of earthquakes in China
- List of earthquakes in Yunnan
