= Momauk =

Momauk မိုးမောက်မြို့, ဝဵင်းမိူင်းမွၵ်
- Town
- Location in Burma
- Coordinates: 24°15′0″N 97°21′0″E
- Country: Myanmar
- Division: Kachin State
- District: Bhamo District
- Township: Momauk Township

Population (2005)
  - Religions: Buddhism
- Time zone: UTC+6.30 (MST)

Momauk (Burmese: မိုးမောက်မြို့, Shan: ဝဵင်းမိူင်းမွၵ်) is a town in the Kachin State in the northernmost part of Myanmar (Burma). During the Myanmar civil war, the area between Momauk and Bhamo became a focal point of intense conflict, and Momauk was captured by the Kachin Independence Army in August 2024.

Momauk means "country that sends messengers" (Shan: ဝဵင်းမိူင်းမွၵ်) in Shan.
