= Pang War =

Pang War ပန်ဝါ Pangwa
- Town
- Pang War
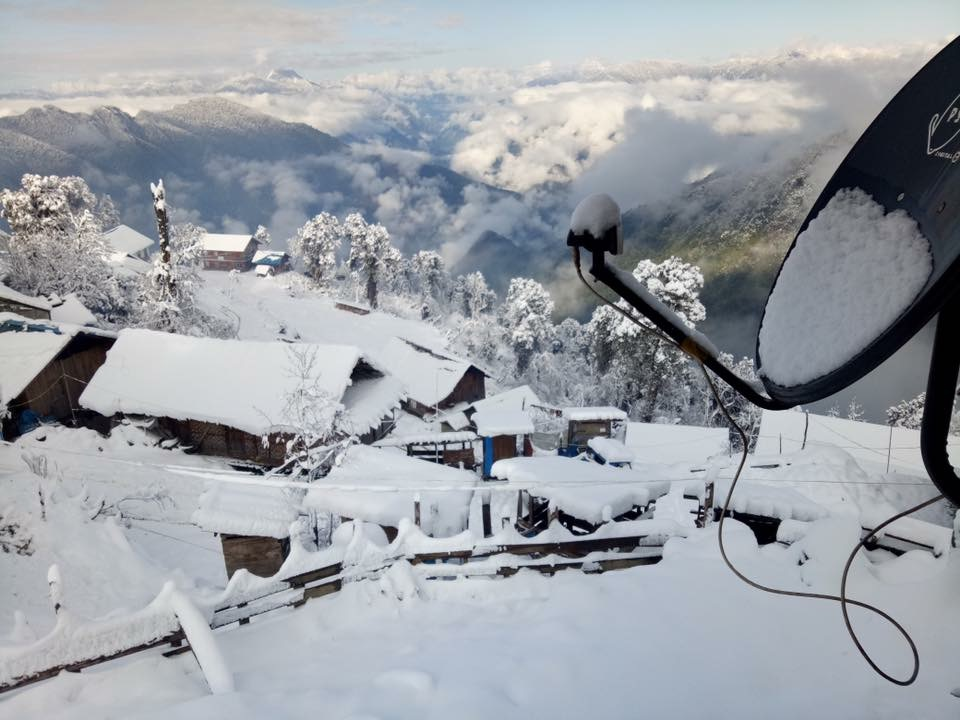
- Pang War in winter

- Location in Burma
- Coordinates: 25°35′39″N 98°22′44″E
- Myanmar: Myanmar
- State: Kachin State
- District: Myitkyina District
- Township: Chipwi Township

Area
  - Total: 0.578 sq mi (1.50 km^{2})
- Elevation: 7,605 ft (2,318 m)

Population (2019)
  - Total: 5,116
  - Density: 8,850/sq mi (3,420/km^{2})
  - Ethnicities: Kokang; Wa
- Time zone: UTC+6.30 (MMT)

Pang War (Burmese: ပန်ဝါ, alternatively spelt Pangwa or Pang Wah) is a town in Chipwi Township, Myitkyina District, Kachin State, Northeastern Myanmar. The town lies along the China–Myanmar border and serves as a border crossing between the two countries.

The town is part of Myanmar's Kachin Special Region 1. The town is also known for its snowy landscape in the winter, with some locals nicknaming it the "ice city".

== History ==
The village of Pang War was elevated to town status by Notification 200/24-66/U-1 on 5 January 2011.

=== Rare Earth Mining ===
The town serves as a hub for rare earth mining under the control of the New Democratic Army – Kachin (NDA-K) administered as Kachin Special Region 1.

On 4 June 2024, a landslide occurred at a rare earth mine in Pang War, resulting in the deaths of at least 7 miners and the disappearance of at least 10 additional miners. Then on 15 June, another landslide occurred at rare earth mine in Pang War resulting in 50 miners going missing. Little information was made available as search and rescue operations commenced.

=== 2024 Kachin offensive ===
During the renewed Myanmar civil war, Pang War became the target of offensives by the Kachin Independence Army (KIA) against the NDA-K in October 2024. Fighting in the area began as early as mid-September as the resistance-aligned KIA and the junta-aligned NDA-K fought in Chipwi Township in the valley with NDA-K and the junta losing the strategic Lag Way camp nearby. The junta continued their defence with airstrikes as their Pang War Border Guard Forces Battalion 1002 remained on the ground to defend.

On 15 October, the 1002 battalion headquarters in Pang War was captured. By 23 October 2024, the town had been completely taken with the KIA seizing the NDA-K leader's house.
