= Sadon =

Sadon ဆဒုံး Sadung
- Town
- Location within Myanmar
- Coordinates: 25°23′34″N 97°53′59″E
- Country: Myanmar
- State: Kachin State
- District: Myitkyina District
- Township: Waingmaw Township

Population (2014)
  - Total: 10,496
- Time zone: UTC+6:30 (MST)

Sadon or Sadung (Burmese: ဆဒုံးမြို့၊ )(Tai: ᥔᥤᥖᥨᥒᥰ) is a town located in Waingmaw Township, Myitkyina District of Kachin State, Myanmar (Burma). The Kachin Independence Army took control of the town in June 2024 during the Myanmar civil war.
