= New Democratic Army – Kachin =

Former ethnic armed group in Myanmar

- ကချင်ဒီမိုကရေစီသစ် တပ်မတော်
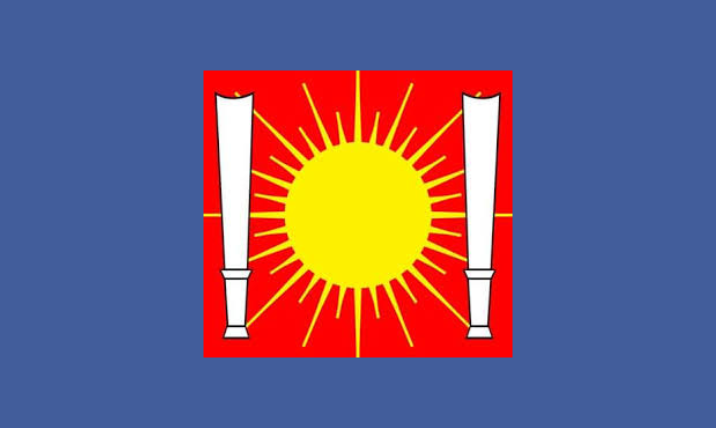
- Flag of the NDA-K
- Leaders: Zahkung Ting Ying (a.k.a. S'Khon Tein Yein); Layawk Zelum; Ying Zelum
- Dates active: (1989–2009) (2024-present) As NDA-K (2009 – 2024) As BGF
- Headquarters: Pangwa, Kachin State
- Active regions: Kachin State, Myanmar; Myanmar-China border
- Ideology: Kachin nationalism Communism
- Size: 200–300; 700 (peak)
- Wars: the internal conflict in Myanmar

The New Democratic Army – Kachin (Burmese: ကချင်ဒီမိုကရေစီသစ် တပ်မတော်; abbreviated NDA-K), officially known as the Kachin Border Guard Force, was an armed insurgent group that operated in Kachin State, Myanmar. After signing a ceasefire agreement with the military of Myanmar in 1989, it was subsequently converted into a pro-Tatmadaw militia, eventually officially being converted into a Border Guard Force in November 2009.

== History ==
The NDA-K was founded in 1989 by former Kachin Independence Organization (KIO) officers Zahkung Ting Ying (a.k.a. S'Khon Tein Yein), Layawk Zelum, and Ying Zelum, when they led a communist faction of 700 soldiers that split from the KIO due to its political and ethnic differences. The KIO was led by members of the Jingpo subgroup, while the NDA-K is led by members of the Lacid subgroup. In the same year, the group agreed to a ceasefire with the government, and it de facto operated under the Tatmadaw's command as a "special regional task force".

The group received a budget, rations, and supplies from the government. Additionally, 600 soldiers were paid by the government as part of the Myanmar Police Force. In November 2009, the group became one of the first insurgent groups under a ceasefire agreement to convert into a "border guard force". Some members have since joined the Kachin State Progressive Party (KSPP) to contest in the 2010 general election.

=== Myanmar civil war (2021 - present) ===
On 15 October 2024, as part of wider Operation 0307, the Kachin Independence Army (KIA) captured BGF Battalion 1002 from the NDA-K following a week of fighting. It was one of three BGF Battalions held by the NDA-K.

On 21 October, the KIA captured the town of Pang War from the NDA-K.

On 22 October, the KIA captured another BGF Battalion, Battalion 1003, near Kanpaikti, leaving only one Battalion left, Battalion 1001. On 23 October, the KIA sealed off the home of NDA-K leader Zahkung Ting Ying in Pang War. Attempts to locate him in Pang War were unsuccessful.

On 31 October, KIA and PDF forces capture the last BGF Battalion 1001 HQ near Phimaw, Myitkyina District. NDA-K and allied Junta troops then fled to the Chinese border town of Ganfai.

On 20 November, the KIA captured Kanpaikti, the final stronghold of the BGF. The town's capture leaves only the city of Muse as the last border crossing along the China/Myanmar border under Junta control.

The KIA's victory at Kanpaikti has rendered the NDA-K virtually completely defeated.

=== Splinter group ===
A Rawang leader Lauban Tanggu Dang (Ah Dang; Burmese: တန်ဂူးတန်) established the Rebellion Resistance Force from the NDA-K group.

== Leader ==
Zahkung Ting Ying is a Ngochang from the Yunnan Frontier. In 1968, he split from Kachin Independence Army and joined the Communist Party of Burma and established the CPB's 101 War Zone with Zaluman, another KIA defector. In 2016, he was expelled from the Pyidaungsu Hluttaw for violating election laws while campaigning.

== Illegal rare-earth mining ==
Illegal rare earth mining has surged in NDA-K held areas bordering China following the 2021 Myanmar coup d'état. In April 2021, 100 rare earth mines were found in the area controlled by the militia. As the Chinese government cracked down on domestic rare earth mining, it has outsourced the destructive mining to Kachin State. As of March 2022, 2,700 mining collection pools scattered across 300 separate locations were found in Kachin State, encompassing the area of Singapore, and an exponential increase from 2016. Zahkung Ting Ying and other militia leaders have profited from this extractive industry. In December 2021, US$200 million in rare earths were exported to China.

== See also ==
- Kachin Independence Organisation
