= Nabang, Yingjiang County =

Nabang 那邦镇
- Town
- Location in Yunnan
- Coordinates: 24°44′53″N 97°33′32″E
- Country: People's Republic of China
- Province: Yunnan
- Autonomous prefecture: Dehong
- County: Yingjiang
- Elevation: 858 m (2,815 ft)
- Time zone: UTC+8 (China Standard)

Nabang (Chinese: 那邦; pinyin: Nàbāng; lit. 'That state') is a town in Yingjiang County in western Yunnan province, China. As of 2023, it has three villages under its administration - Nabang, Jiedao and Daonong.

The town borders Laiza, Kachin State, Myanmar and Nabang port border crossing saw approximately fifty thousand monthly border crossings- with a significant rural migrant worker population.

The town has a diversion hydropower plant powered by a diversion canal built in 2011 with a 180 MW nameplate capacity. The plant was built Yingjiang Huafu, with project involvement by United Kingdom-based Climate Bridge. It became operational in 2012.
