= Kan Paik Ti =

Kan Paik Ti ကန်ပိုက်တီမြို့
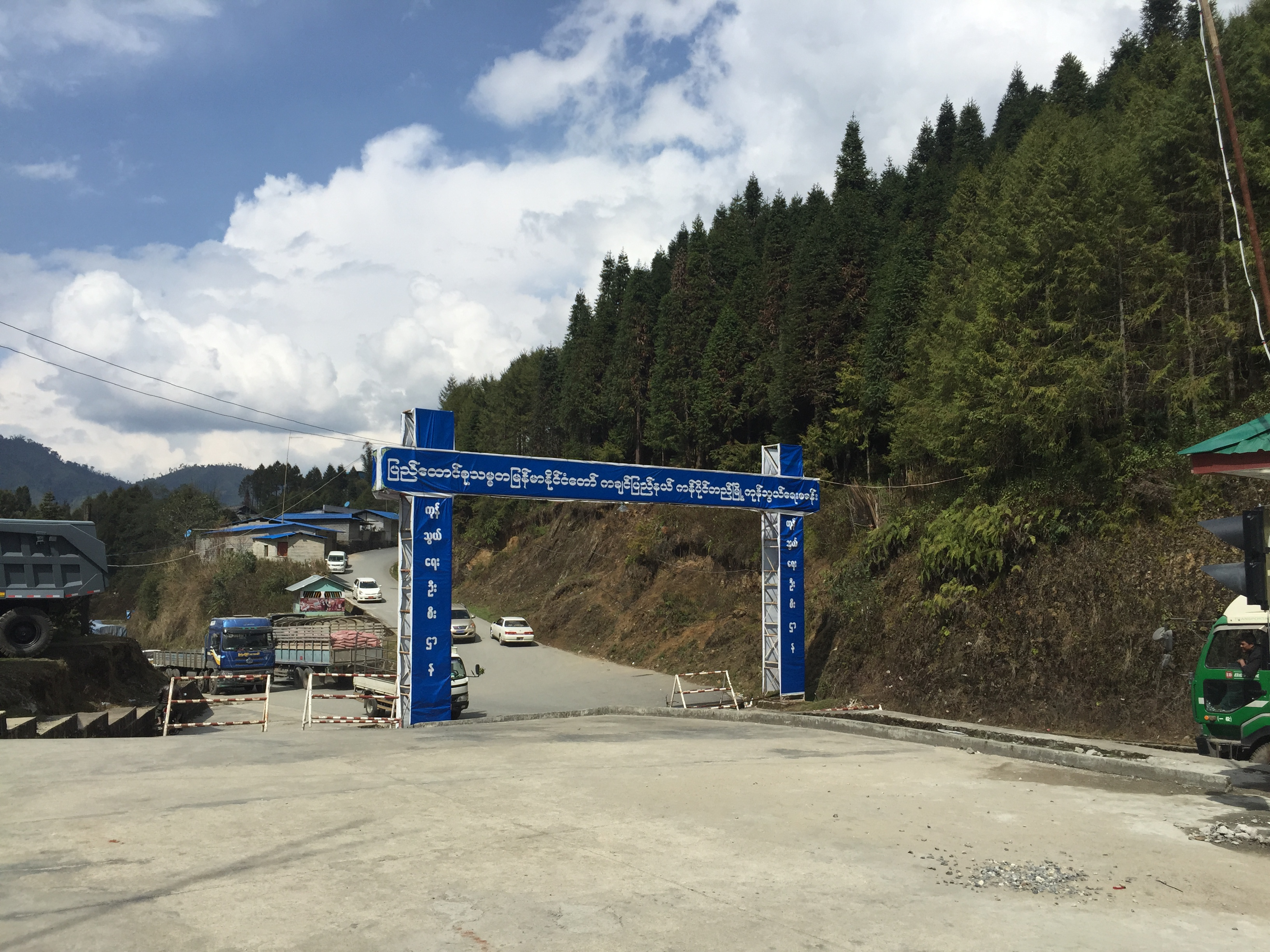
- China-Myanmar Border Trade Station at Kan Paik Ti

- Location in Myanmar
- Coordinates: 25°24′11″N 98°07′03″E
- Country: Myanmar
- Division: Kachin State
- District: Myitkyina District
- Township: Waingmaw Township

Population (2014)
  - Total: 8,682
  - Religions: Christian Buddhist
- Time zone: UTC+6.30 (MST)

Kan Paik Ti (Burmese: ကန်ပိုက်တီမြို့; also Kanpaikti) is a town in Waingmaw Township, Myitkyina District, Kachin State of Myanmar (Burma). The town is home to one of 5 official border trade posts with China, and opened on 23 August 1998. In 2022, total trade volume at the border post stood at US$88.181 million.

On 20 November 2024, as part of the Myanmar civil war, Kanpaikti was captured by the KIA. It was the final stronghold of the BGF.
