= Waingmaw =

Waingmaw ဝိုင်းမော်မြို့
- Town
- Location in Burma
- Coordinates: 25°21′03″N 97°26′34″E
- Country: Myanmar
- Division: Kachin State
- District: Myitkyina District
- Township: Waingmaw Township

Population (2014)
  - Total: 21,969
  - Religions: Buddhism Christianity
- Time zone: UTC+6.30 (MST)
- Climate: Cwa

Waingmaw (Burmese: ဝိုင်းမော်မြို့; Shan: ဝဵင်းမႂ်ႇ; Jinghpaw: Waimaw) is a town in Kachin State. It is directly southeast of Myitkyina. As of 2014 it had a population of 21,969. Waingmaw is a Shan name meaning "new town".

== Notable people ==
- Ze Hkaung (born 1981) - politician
