= Waingmaw Township =

Coordinates: 25.3500°N 97.4333°E

Waingmaw Township ဝိုင်းမော်မြို့နယ်
- Township
- Location in Myitkyina district
- Country: Myanmar
- State: Kachin State
- District: Myitkyina District
- Time zone: UTC+6:30 (MMT)

Waimaw Township (Burmese: ဝိုင်းမော်မြို့နယ်) (Shan :ဝဵင်းမႂ်ႇ Tai nue:ᥝᥥᥒᥰᥛᥬᥱ เวียงใหม่)is a township of Myitkyina District in the Kachin State of Myanmar (Burma). The principal town is Waingmaw and other towns are Sadon and Kan Paik Ti.

In January 2017, Waimaw Township was home to two internally displaced persons camps, Zai Awng and Hkau Shau, which were hit by mortar fire.
