= Bhamo Airport =

Bhamo Airport (Banmaw Airport) ဗန်းမော် လေဆိပ်
- IATA: BMO; ICAO: VYBM

Summary
- Airport type: Public
- Operator: Government
- Serves: Bhamo (Banmaw), Myanmar
- Elevation AMSL: 378 ft (115 m)
- Coordinates: 24°16′15″N 97°14′49″E

Map
- Location of airport in Myanmar

Runways
Direction	Length		Surface
Direction	m	ft	Surface
15/33	1,677	5,502	Bitumen

Bhamo Airport (IATA: BMO, ICAO: VYBM) is an airport serving Bhamo (Banmaw), a city in the Kachin State in northern Myanmar. It is also known as Banmaw Airport.

== History ==
Built as a Japanese Air Force base in 1942, the airport was attacked numerous times by Allied forces before being seized in May 1945. It was repaired by the 1891st Engineer Aviation Battalion then was used as a combat resupply and casualty evacuation airfield by Tenth Air Force, which moved elements of the 1st Combat Cargo Group to the field. It was also used as a communications relay station as well as a base for forward air controllers (51st Fighter Control Squadron). It was closed at the end of September 1945.

On 26 January 2025, the Kachin Independence Army and People's Defence Force captured the airport.

== Facilities ==
The airport resides at an elevation of 370 feet (113 m) above mean sea level. It has 1 runway designated 15/33 with a bituminous surface measuring 1,677 by 31 metres (5,502 ft × 102 ft).

== Airlines and destinations ==
Airlines	Destinations
Myanmar National Airlines	Mandalay
