= Bhamo =

Bhamo ဗန်းမော်မြို့ (ဝဵင်းမၢၼ်ႈမူဝ်ႇ) Hsinkai
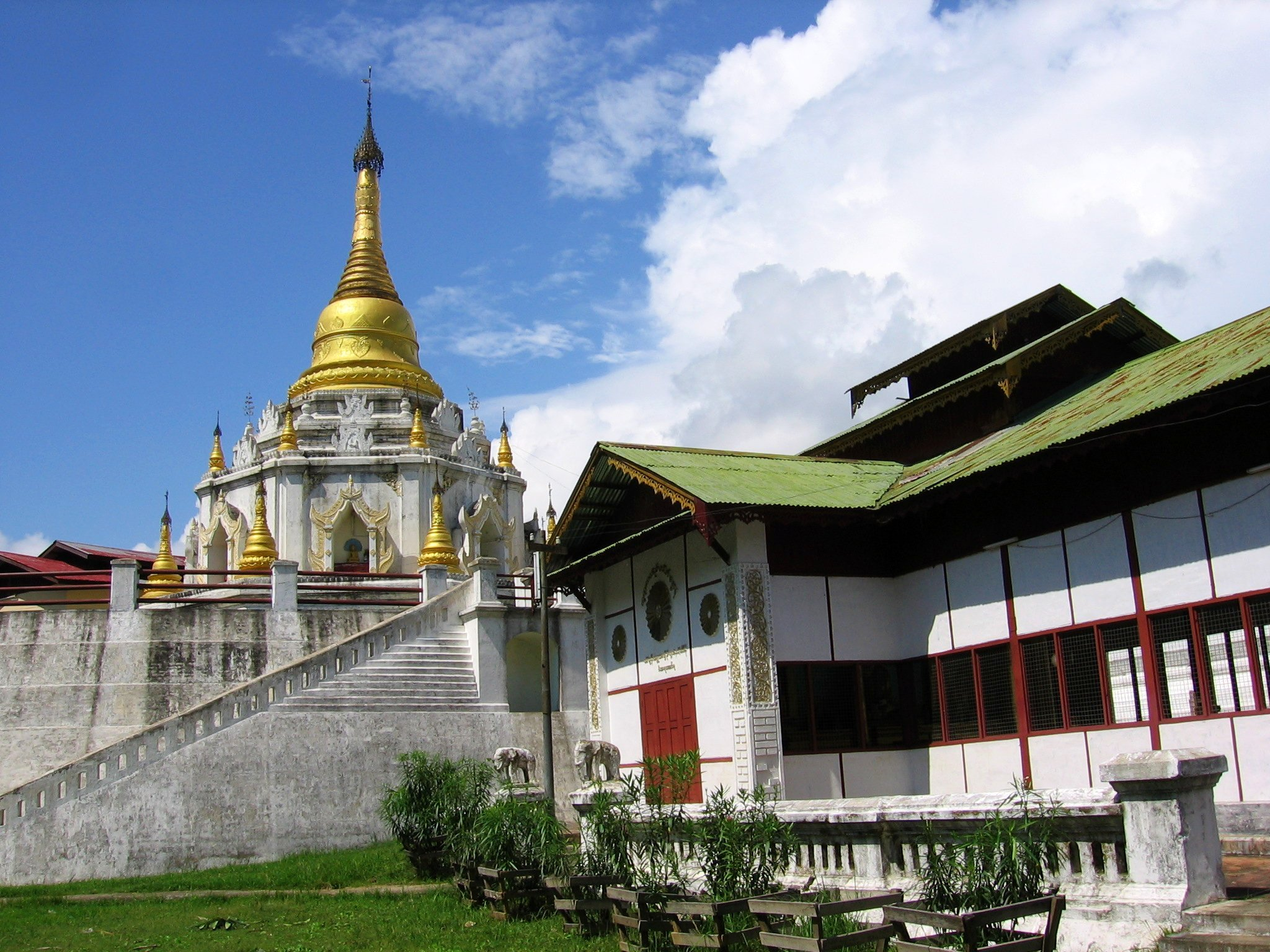

- Location in Burma
- Coordinates: 24°16′0″N 97°14′0″E
- Country: Myanmar
- Division: Kachin State
- District: Bhamo District
- Township: Bhamo Township

Population (2019)
  - Total: 54,721
  - Ethnicities: Bamar (51.54%)
  - Religions: Theravada Buddhism
- Time zone: UTC+6.30 (MST)
- Climate: Cwa

Bhamo (Burmese: ဗန်းမော်မြို့ ban: mau mrui., also spelt Banmaw), historically known as Man Maw (Shan: မၢၼ်ႈမူဝ်ႇ; Tai Nüa: ᥛᥫᥒᥰ ᥛᥨᥝᥱ) or Hsinkai (Chinese: 新街; pinyin: Xīnjiē) is a city in Kachin State in northern Myanmar, 186 km (116 mi) south of the state capital, (Myitkyina). It is on the Ayeyarwady River. It lies within 65 km (40 mi) of the border with Yunnan Province, China. The population consists primarily of residents Chinese or Shan descent, with Kachin peoples primarily occupying the hills around the town. It is the administrative center of Bhamo District and Bhamo Township.

== Etymology ==
Bhamo is derived from the Shan language placename "Man Maw" (Shan: မၢၼ်ႈမေႃႇး, [maan˧ mɔ˧]; Tai Nüa: ᥛᥫᥒᥰ ᥛᥨᥝᥱ), meaning "potter's village" or "village of jars."

== History ==
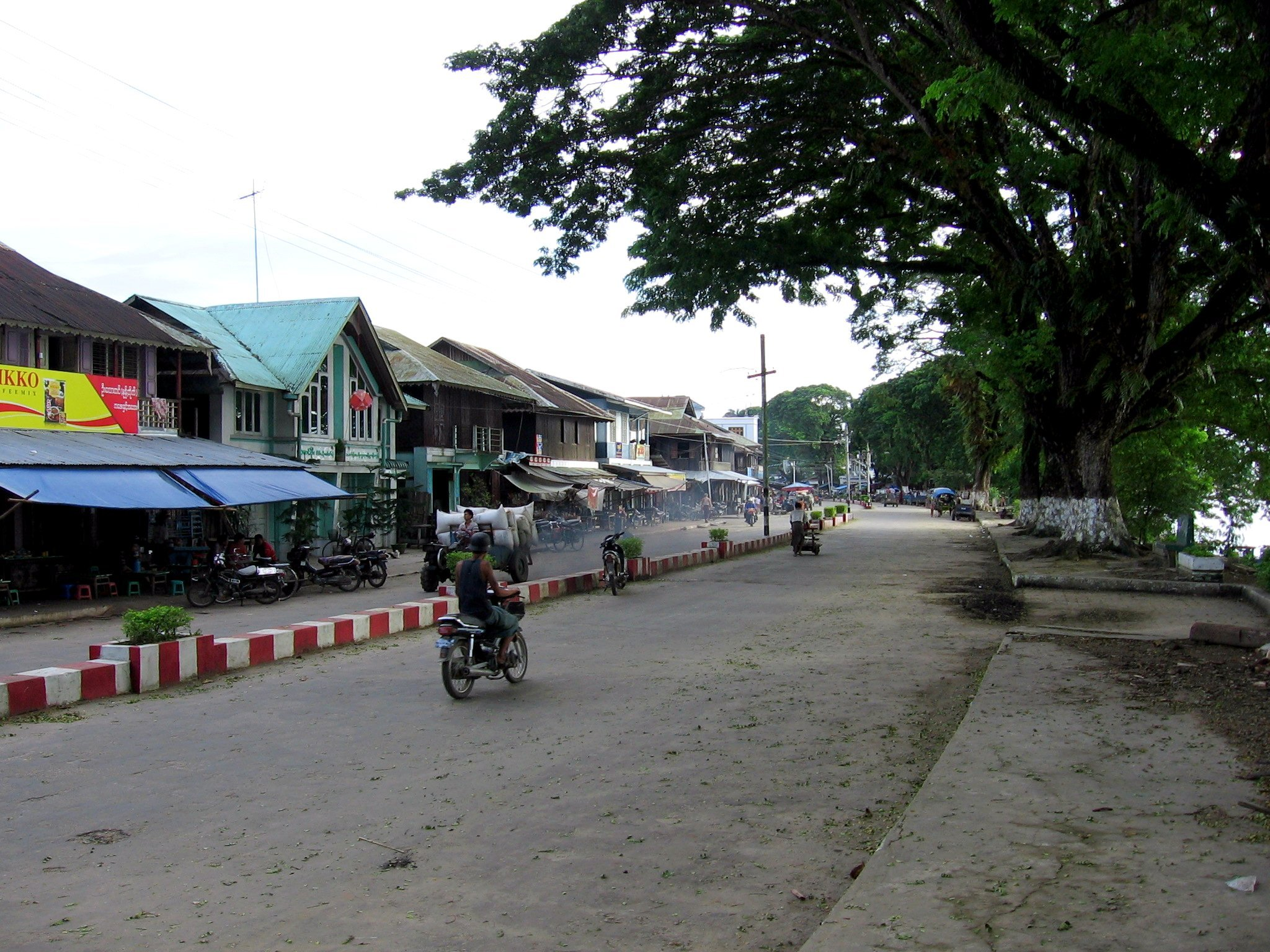

Bhamo was once called Sampanago, the capital of the now-extinct Shan predecessor kingdom of Man Maw. The ruins of the old city walls, dating from the fifth century, are found some 5 kilometres (3.1 mi) from the modern town.

From 1869 to 1879, it was the seat of British colonial Assistant political agent, subordinate to the Resident with the king of and in Ava. In the early 20th century, due to its location at the highest navigable point of the river, it formed a part of caravan routes bringing jade from India to China.

== Contemporary ==
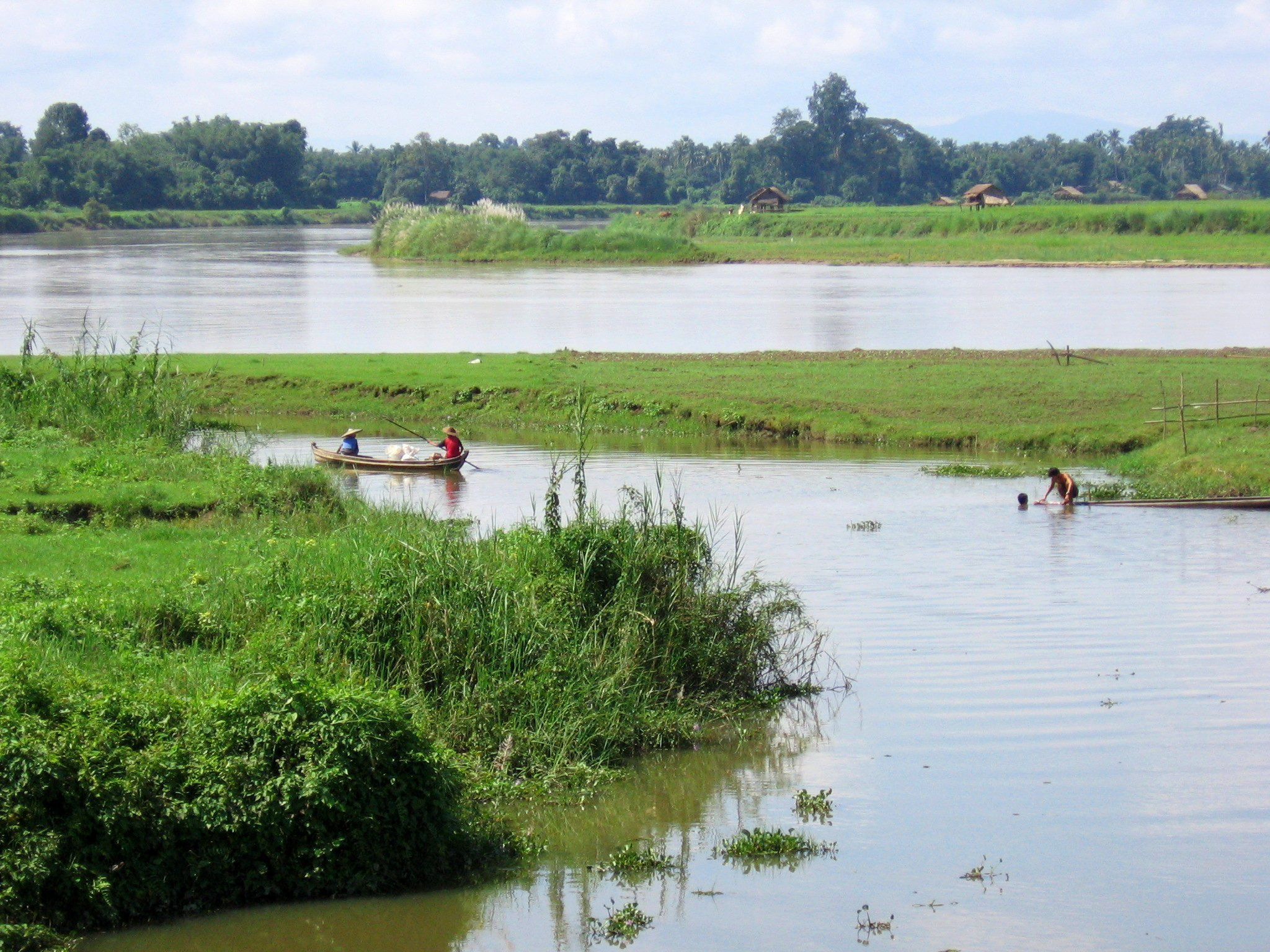

Bhamo is the terminus of river ferries from Mandalay. There is no river ferry between Bhamo and the state capital Myitkyina. The land route between Bhamo and Mu Se District (Muse, part of northern Shan State) is in poor condition.

Bhamo is one of the official border trading towns between China and Myanmar.

== Education ==
There are three universities in Bhamo: Banmaw University; Technological University (Banmaw); and University of Computer Science (Banmaw).

== Climate ==
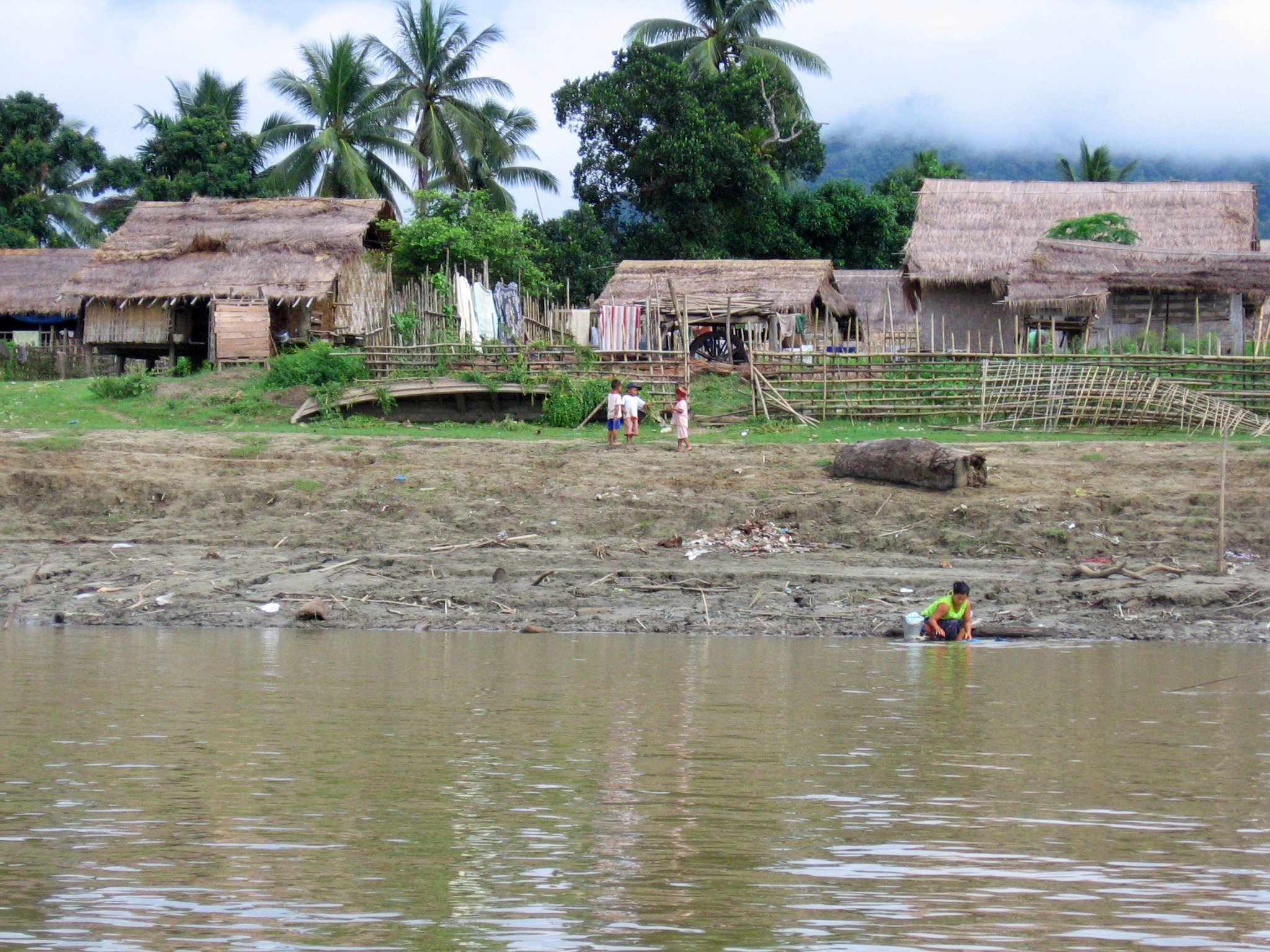

Bhamo has a climate that lies in the transition between tropical savanna climate (Köppen climate classification Aw) and humid subtropical climate (Köppen climate classification Cwa). Temperatures are very warm throughout the year, although the winter months (December–February) are milder. There is a winter dry season (November–April) and a summer wet season (May–October).

Climate data for Bhamo (1991–2020)
Month	Jan	Feb	Mar	Apr	May	Jun	Jul	Aug	Sep	Oct	Nov	Dec	Year
Record high °C (°F)	31.5 (88.7)	35.8 (96.4)	39.0 (102.2)	40.3 (104.5)	42.5 (108.5)	41.5 (106.7)	38.5 (101.3)	37.8 (100.0)	38.8 (101.8)	37.8 (100.0)	33.6 (92.5)	31.8 (89.2)	42.5 (108.5)
Mean daily maximum °C (°F)	26.1 (79.0)	28.9 (84.0)	32.3 (90.1)	34.6 (94.3)	34.3 (93.7)	32.7 (90.9)	31.7 (89.1)	31.9 (89.4)	32.3 (90.1)	31.4 (88.5)	29.0 (84.2)	26.2 (79.2)	31.0 (87.8)
Daily mean °C (°F)	18.4 (65.1)	20.9 (69.6)	24.5 (76.1)	27.6 (81.7)	28.9 (84.0)	28.9 (84.0)	28.4 (83.1)	28.4 (83.1)	28.3 (82.9)	26.7 (80.1)	23.0 (73.4)	19.3 (66.7)	25.3 (77.5)
Mean daily minimum °C (°F)	10.6 (51.1)	12.9 (55.2)	16.6 (61.9)	20.7 (69.3)	23.5 (74.3)	25.1 (77.2)	25.1 (77.2)	24.9 (76.8)	24.3 (75.7)	22.1 (71.8)	16.9 (62.4)	12.3 (54.1)	19.6 (67.3)
Record low °C (°F)	7.0 (44.6)	7.7 (45.9)	9.5 (49.1)	16.5 (61.7)	18.7 (65.7)	21.5 (70.7)	22.0 (71.6)	21.0 (69.8)	21.2 (70.2)	16.1 (61.0)	10.0 (50.0)	6.8 (44.2)	6.8 (44.2)
Average precipitation mm (inches)	13.2 (0.52)	11.4 (0.45)	13.6 (0.54)	46.1 (1.81)	169.4 (6.67)	342.8 (13.50)	405.4 (15.96)	393.8 (15.50)	224.9 (8.85)	133.2 (5.24)	28.3 (1.11)	6.6 (0.26)	1,788.8 (70.43)
Average precipitation days (≥ 1.0 mm)	1.7	2.0	2.6	6.3	12.8	20.4	23.5	20.6	14.6	9.7	2.9	1.3	118.5
Source 1: World Meteorological Organization
Source 2: Norwegian Meteorological Institute (extremes)

== See also ==
- Banmaw Airport

== Sources ==
- WorldStatesmen – Burma/Myanmar
