= Territory of the Kachin Independence Army =

KIA's Administration of its territory

Kachin State Special Region 2 (Note: Name of the formerly Autonomous Special Region (1994–2011))
- Flag used by the KIA
- Status: Quasi-state
- Capital: Laiza
- Government: Civil administration
  - Commander-in-Chief of the KIA: Hkawng Lum
  - Chief of Staff of the KIA: Unknown
  - Vice Chief of Staff of the KIA: Sumlut Gun Maw
  - Chairman of the KIO: Htang Gam Shawng
  - Vice Chairman of the KIO: Sumlut Gun Maw
  - Deputy Chairmen of the KIO: Gun Maw and Zong Buk Htan
  - Spokesperson of the KIA and Spokesperson of the KIO: Naw Bu
- History
  - Established: 8 June 2011

The Territory of the Kachin Independence Army refers to the areas under the control of the Kachin Independence Army. From 1994 to 2011, it was known as the Kachin State Special Region 2, being given autonomous status through ceasefire.

== Background and Formation ==
In 1960, the Kachin Independence Organization started an insurgency against the government of Myanmar and, on 5 February 1961, founded the Kachin Independence Council and the Kachin Independence Army. The KIA became, with it, the armed wing of the KIO and fought against the Tatmadaw until 1963, when peace talks with the government started. During the peace talks, the KIA under Zau Tu occupied nearly all the villages in Kamaing and Bamaw. The peace talks ultimately failed in the same year, and the KIA began to recruit new insurgents. Between 1963 and 1994, the KIA fought further against the Tatmadaw and even fought for a short period of time against the Communist Party of Burma. On 1994 a ceasefire agreement with the government was made, as result the Kachin Autonomous Zone also known as Kachin State Special Region 2 which shouldn't be confused with the Kachin Special Region 1 of the New Democratic Army – Kachin, which was formed in 2009.

In 1995, in the Kachin State, the Mohnyin District was created out of Myitkyina District as part of the peace agreement with the Kachin Independence Army. Besides that, the KIA neither disarmed nor surrendered, continuing to recruit, train and mobilise soldiers. Before the ceasefire, the KIA was primarily a guerrilla force, but peace provided an opportunity to establish a military academy and design officer-training programs. By working with the KIA, the Tatmadaw capitalized on the resource-rich lands of the Kachin Autonomous Zone, providing limited recognition in exchange for access to and security of resources like jade, teak and rubber. The KIO's Buga company built 2 hydro-electric dams to power the Kachin Autonomous Zone and sells power to civilians outside of its areas as well as the Burmese army. In 2008 tensions began between the Tatmadaw and the Kachin Independence Army, these escalated into the Kachin conflict, which started on 8 July 2011.

In 2011, the KIA claimed that the regime's 2008 Constitution lacked federal democratic principles and equal political rights for ethnic minorities based on the Panglong Agreement; the KIA also rejected the government plan to make the KIA part of the Border Guards. In response, the Tatmadaw began to attack KIA positions as part of a plan to take Kachin State Special Region 2 on 8 July 2011.

== Governance ==
=== Taxation ===
The KIO has implemented a tiered tax system for businesses, including private schools, and jade and gold mining companies, to fund armed operations. Similarly, in northern Shan State, the KIO/KIA has increased taxes from local businesses, including shops and vehicles passing through KIO/KIA checkpoints.

Private schools were opened in there territory.

=== Mining ===
Chinese investors are allowed to explore, extract and to transport rare-earth materials after paying taxes to the central KIO. The KIA is also providing security for mining operations, and attempts to establish sustainable mining practices in its areas. In 2025, they introduced a rare earth mining management regulation.

== Territorial development ==
=== 2011 ===
After a 17-year ceasefire, the Tatmadaw attack KIA positions under the pretext of disputes over the construction of Chinese-owned dams.

=== 2012 ===
In April 2012, the battle for Pangwa in Chipwi Township near Luchang was fought between the KIA and the government soldiers. Clashes erupted again in late April, when the KIA launched an offensive to capture Burmese military posts around Pangwa. The KIA offensive succeeded and the Myanmar Army retreated from the area by the end of April.

=== 2018 ===
Between 1 and 6 April 2018, Tatmadaw soldiers allegedly attacked KIA positions in the KIA-controlled Mansi Township, though no reports of fighting emerged from the region. The KIA later raided the Tatmadaw's Battalion 86 military base in Hpakant Township on 6 April 2018, killing eight government soldiers and capturing 13. By 10 April 2018, locals claimed that 18 Tatmadaw soldiers and three KIA insurgents had been killed in the clashes.

=== 2021 ===
On 25 March 2021, the KIA seized the military base of Alaw Bum near Laiza, which they had lost for over 20 years. On 11 April, the junta military launched an attack to recapture the base using airstrikes and ground troops. The military suffered heavy casualties and had to retreat after a three-day battle.

=== 2024 ===
On 29 April 2024, the KIA took over the town of Sinbo.

In September 2024 the KIA took control over Chipwi.

In October 2024, the KIA took control over Hsawlaw and Pangwa which was the capital of the Kachin Special Region 1.

On 28 November 2024, the KIA abolished the Kachin Special Region 1 after capturing Kanpaikti.

=== 2026 ===
On 17 March 2026 it was reported that Myanmar National Democratic Alliance Army fighters pressed the KIA to dismantle their checkpoints along the Lashio-Muse road near Nant Hpat Kar village in Kutkai Township, the KIA reported though that no formal request by the MNDAA was made. Later it was reported that the MNDAA removed the KIA's tax-collection gates in Nam Hpat Kar.

== See also ==
- People's Government of Kokang
- Ta'ang People's Government
- Territory of the Arakan Army
- Wa State
- Chinland
- Karenni State Interim Executive Council
- Republic of Kawthoolei
- Sagaing Federal Unit Interim Government
