= Kachin conflict =

Armed conflict in northern Myanmar

- Part of the Myanmar conflict
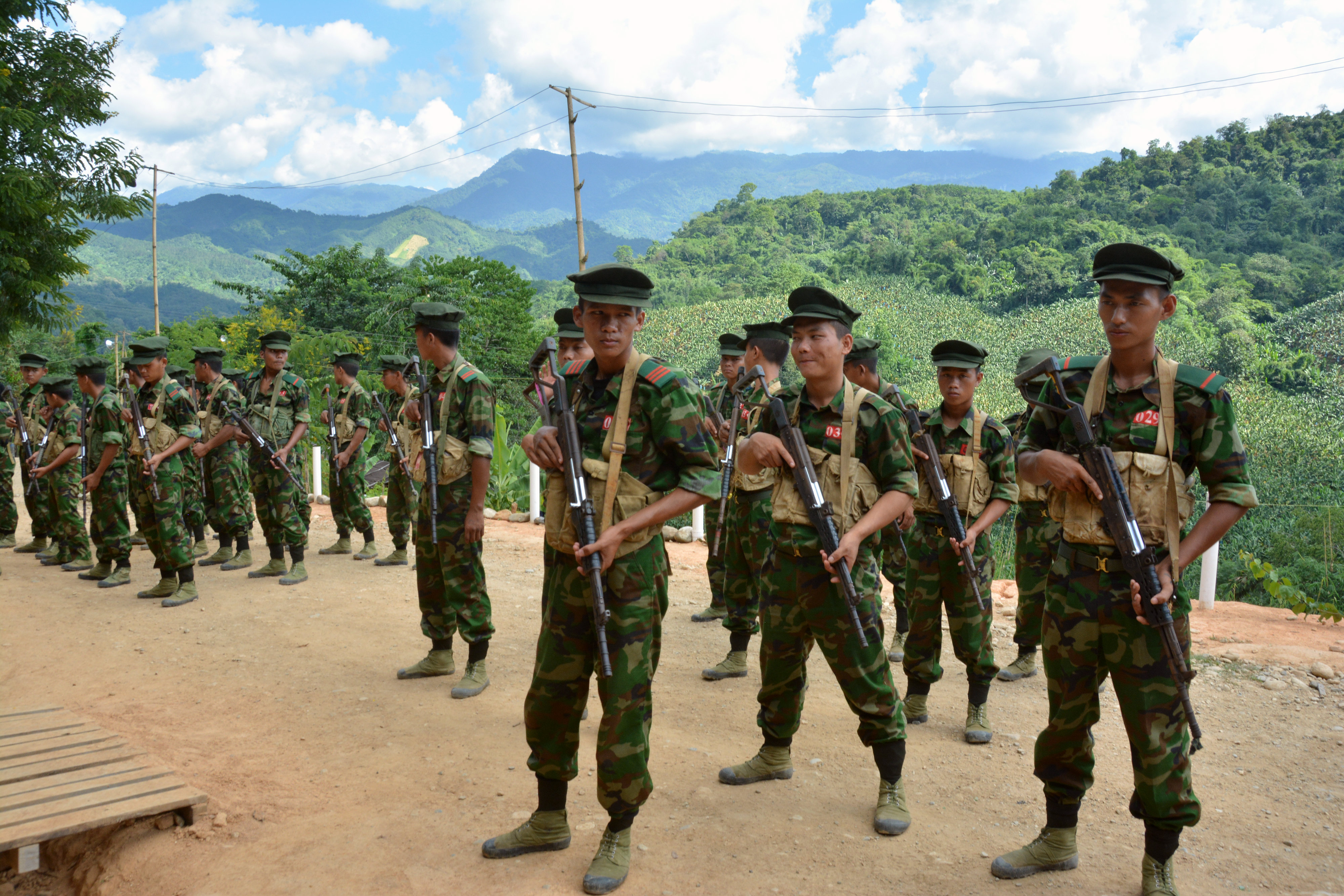
- Cadets of the Kachin Independence Army (KIA) preparing for military drills at the group's headquarters in Laiza, Kachin State.
Date	First conflict: 5 February 1961 – 24 February 1994 (33 years, 2 weeks and 5 days); Second conflict: 9 June 2011 – present (15 years, 4 months and 4 weeks)
Location	Kachin State and northern Shan State
Status	Ongoing; Ceasefire signed between the government of Myanmar and the Kachin Independence Army in 1994; Resumption of hostilities in 2011 after the 17-year ceasefire is broken

Belligerents
Union of Burma (1961–1962); Socialist Republic of the Union of Burma (1962–1988); Union of Myanmar (1988–1994); Republic of the Union of Myanmar; State Administration Council (Note: 2021–2025); State Security and Peace Commission (Note: 2025–present)	Kachin Independence Organisation (1961–1994); Kachin Defense Army (1961–2010); Arakan Army; All Burma Students' Democratic Front; National Unity Government; Communist Party of Burma; New Democratic Army – Kachin (1989–2009); Shanni Nationalities Army (2016–2021)

Commanders and leaders
Min Aung Hlaing; Soe Win; Mya Tun Oo; Win Myint; Aung San Suu Kyi; Htin Kyaw; Sein Win; Thein Sein; Wai Lwin; Than Shwe; Saw Maung; San Yu; Ne Win; Win Maung	N'Ban La; Htang Gam Shawng; Twan Mrat Naing; Zaw Seng (executed); Zaw Tu (executed); Zaw Dan †

Units involved
Tatmadaw; Myanmar Army; 33rd Light Infantry Division; Myanmar Air Force	Kachin Independence Army; People's Defence Force; Other civilian militias

Strength
20,000	10,000–12,000 (2013); 200 (2013)

Casualties and losses
- 1961–1994: 5,000+ killed Since 2011: 2,100+ killed 100,000+ civilians displaced
- ^{a} Briefly clashed with the KIA from 1971 to 1972.

The Kachin conflict or the Kachin War is one of the multiple conflicts which are collectively referred to as the internal conflict in Myanmar. Kachin insurgents have been fighting against the Tatmadaw (Myanmar Armed Forces) since 1961, with only one major ceasefire being brokered between them, which lasted from 1994 to 2011, a total of 17 years.

Since the resumption of hostilities in 2011, thousands of civilians have been killed, whilst over 100,000 more have been displaced. Widespread use of landmines, child soldiers, systematic rape and torture have been alleged by both sides.

== Background ==
The Kachin people (or the Jingpo) are a confederation of six ethnic groups whose homeland encompasses territory in the Kachin Hills of northern Myanmar, in Yunnan and Northeast India. Following Burmese independence from the United Kingdom, many ethnic minorities, including the Kachins, campaigned for self-determination and independence.

Shortly after the country's independence, the Karen conflict broke out in 1949. The leader of the First Kachin Rifles, Naw Seng, was ordered to attack the Karen National Union (KNU)'s capital at Taungoo. He swapped sides and helped the KNU attack Mandalay. After the central government successfully pushed back the KNU after the Battle of Insein, Naw Seng and the First Kachin Rifles headed into northern Shan State to attempt to capture Lashio. On 15 November 1949, the Pawng Yawng National Defence Force was formed in Kutkai, with goal of spreading a Kachin rebellion amongst ethnic Kachins in Shan and Kachin State. Over the next two months, the Pawng Yawng rebellion captured Lashio and Namhkam, Shan State but failed to muster support amongst the Kachin populace. Eventually in April 1950, Naw Seng and his troops fled into China following talks with Kachin leaders who remained in support of the central government.

The Kachin Independence Organisation (KIO) was founded by dissidents in 1960 as a result of the grievances which existed between the majority-Bamar union government and the Kachin people. The Kachin Independence Army (KIA) was established as its armed wing on 5 February 1961, acting as a private army with 27 members. In the early 1960s the KIA began expanding and increasing in numbers, especially after the 1962 Burmese coup d'état and its perceived threat by ethnic minorities.

== First conflict (1961–1994) ==
In January 1960, then Prime Minister Ne Win, signed a border agreement exchanging land along the China–Myanmar border, including returning three Kachin villages near Hpimaw to China. Then in 1961, Prime Minister U Nu made Buddhism the state religion and caused dissent amongst Christian Kachin nationalists. On 7 March 1961, a group of Kachin nationalists led by Zau Tu and associated with the newly formed Kachin Independence Organisation raided the Lashio treasury, starting the outbreak of the Kachin conflict as the attacks grew into increasingly organized opposition.

Following the unilateral abrogation of the Union of Burma's constitution by General Ne Win and his regime in 1962, many Kachin soldiers in the Tatmadaw (armed forces) defected and joined the Kachin Independence Army (KIA). The KIA did not only fight government soldiers, but occasionally clashed with communists outside and inside their own ranks. The Communist Party of Burma (CPB) had periodically been the KIA's ally and enemy during different years, and a communist-backed faction split from the KIA in 1989, becoming the New Democratic Army - Kachin (NDA-K).

Aside from its major towns and railway corridor, KIA-controlled areas in Kachin State remained virtually independent and isolated from the rest of Myanmar from the mid-1960s through 1994, with an economy based on cross-border jade trade with China and narcotics trafficking.

After a military offensive by the Myanmar Army in 1994 seized most of the jade mines in Kachin State, the KIA signed a ceasefire agreement with the then-ruling SLORC military junta on 24 February 1994, which resulted in an end to large-scale fighting that lasted until June 2011.

== Second conflict (2011–present) ==
=== 2011 ===
Armed clashes erupted between the Kachin Independence Army (KIA) and the Myanmar Army on 9 June 2011, when government forces broke the ceasefire and attacked KIA positions along the Taping River east of Bhamo, Kachin State, near the Taping hydroelectric plant. Fighting occurred throughout Kachin State, as well as northwestern parts of Shan State.

According to news reports, the recent fighting broke out as a result of the Burmese government's attempts to seize KIA-controlled areas, which are located around lucrative energy projects in Kachin and Shan State backed by the Chinese government. Despite a December 2011 statement by Myanmar's President Thein Sein that he had ordered the Myanmar Army to cease its offensive in Kachin State, the conflict continued into 2012.

=== 2012 ===
In 2012, the largest battles of the reignited conflict occurred in March, along the Myitkyina–Bhamo road. In April, the battle for Pangwa in Chipwi Township near Luchang was fought between the KIA and the government soldiers. Clashes erupted again in late April, when the KIA launched an offensive to capture Burmese military posts around Pangwa. The KIA offensive succeeded and the Myanmar Army retreated from the area by the end of April. In August, the KIA claimed that 140 government troops were killed when they exploded mines buried inside the Myauk Phyu ("White Monkey") jade mine, which was owned by the Wai Aung Kaba Company.

=== 2013 ===
Fortified KIA positions were heavily damaged by airstrikes and artillery launched by the Myanmar Army from December 2012 to January 2013.

On 2 January 2013, the Burmese government confirmed that it carried out airstrikes a few days earlier against the ethnic rebels in northern Kachin, in response to attacks by the Kachin Independence Army. The US government stated that it would "be formally expressing our concern" over the escalation of force used by Myanmar government. On 3 January 2013, the KIA alleged that air-strikes had continued to occur for the sixth consecutive day in the area around Laiza and there were allegations that the Myanmar Armed Forces was also using chemical weapons UN Secretary-General Ban Ki-moon stated following the incidents that Burma's authorities should "desist from any action that could endanger the lives of civilians living in the area or further intensify conflict in the region".

=== 2014 ===
On 14 June 2014, KIA insurgents captured two hydroelectric plants and took six government soldiers and several Chinese workers hostage for several hours, before the Myanmar Army stormed the buildings. A total of six people were killed and four others were wounded in the incident.

On 19 November 2014, government soldiers attacked the KIA's headquarters near Laiza, killing at least 22 insurgents.

=== Ceasefire attempts ===
Numerous rounds of ceasefire talks have taken place between the Kachin Independence Army and the government of Myanmar since fighting resumed in June 2011. According to an 18 December 2012 report by Swedish journalist Bertil Lintner in the Hong Kong-based Asia Times Online, many people have criticised the foreign backed ceasefire efforts for "avoiding discussions of political issues and only emphasizing ceasefires, disarmament and economic development, those interlocutors—including a 'Peace Support Initiative' sponsored by the Norwegian government and in a separate initiative the Switzerland-based Centre for Humanitarian Dialogue—are essentially promoting the government's view". The Australian reported that some Kachin Business leaders were calling on Aung San Suu Kyi to help mediate the dispute and on 6 January 2012, Aung San Suu Kyi said that she could not step into the negotiations without an official invitation from the government to do so, which she had not received.

==== 2013 ceasefire talks ====
On 18 January 2013, immediately prior to an international donors conference in Myanmar, President Thein Sein announced a unilateral ceasefire in the war between the army and the KIO. The ceasefire was said to take effect the following day, on 19 January, but light fighting was also reported the following day and a full-scale government assault was reportedly launched on 20 January and included "sustained mortar and artillery fire" followed by "hundreds of Burmese troops" storming a KIA base on the outskirts of rebel-held town of Laiza.

The government of Thein Sein was reported to be under pressure from "political and business circles" who believed the "escalating conflict would undermine Myanmar's emergence from decades of diplomatic isolation" and had passed a resolution in parliament calling on Min Aung Hlaing, the military's commander-in-chief, to scale down the war. Min Aung Hlaing responded by stating that the military would only carry out attacks only in "self-defense"—the rationale it has consistently given since December 2011 for prosecuting a war against the KIA and the rationale it gave for allowing airstrikes on rebel positions starting on 26 December 2012.

On 4 February, Burmese government and the Kachin Independence Army met in Ruili, China and agreed to reduce military tension in Kachin State and hold further peace talks later in February. However no talks took place later in February but almost no armed clash reportedly happened in Kachin State after the peace talks. According to Mizzima News, on 26 February a KIO central committee member claimed that they would not be meeting with the government in February because they needed more time to consult with the "Kachin people" regarding the negotiations. Burmese government and KIA renewed peace talks in Ruili, China on 11 March 2013. The Kachin Peace Network has claimed that the Chinese government's refusal to allow observers from western countries at peace talks had delayed negotiations, although the Chinese rejected the allegations.

On 30 May, Burmese government and Kachin Independence Army signed a preliminary ceasefire agreement that would lead to further progress towards reaching a peace deal. The parties, however, failed to reach an official ceasefire agreement. United Nations special adviser on Myanmar, Vijay Nambiar, also joined the meeting as an observer, along with representatives of China and other ethnic minorities.

However, the Burmese government and Kachin Independence Army failed to reach a permanent ceasefire agreement after several peace talks in 2013, but agreed to work together towards permanent ceasefire agreement and reduce hostilities.

==== 2014 ceasefire talks ====
Renewed fighting broke out in April 2014 when the Burmese army attacked various KIA positions around Mansi Township, Kachin State and northern Shan State to eradicate timber smuggling and to control strategic routes around their strongholds. The Kachin Independence Army requested a meeting in Myitkyina on 10 May to lessen tensions between the sides.

Negotiations aimed at drafting a nationwide ceasefire agreement began in April 2014 at the Myanmar Peace Centre between representatives of various ethnic armed groups and the Burmese government, but the KIA and Ta'ang National Liberation Army (TNLA) were not among the negotiators.

The KIA's deputy commander-in-chief Gun Maw urged the United States to get involved in the peace process in April 2014.

=== 2018 ===
In March 2018, the Tatmadaw (Myanmar Armed Forces) launched airstrikes against the KIA in Tanai Township, which is part of a large mining region.

Between 1 and 6 April 2018, Tatmadaw soldiers allegedly attacked KIA positions in the KIA-controlled Mansi Township, though no reports of fighting emerged from the region. The KIA later raided the Tatmadaw's Battalion 86 military base in Hpakant Township on 6 April 2018, killing eight government soldiers and capturing 13. By 10 April 2018, locals claimed that 18 Tatmadaw soldiers and three KIA insurgents had been killed in the clashes.

Accusations of abuses perpetrated by the Tatmadaw against civilians emerged in March and April 2018, which included allegations that Tatmadaw soldiers specifically targeted and killed two Kachin and six Shanni farmers. Several civilians were also wounded in the crossfire.

By May 2018, 6,000 IDPs had fled armed clashes and shelling by the Myanmar Army, whilst hundreds more remained trapped in villages caught between the crossfire. Hunger became a prevalent issue for IDPs, with some resorting to eating banana stems.

=== 2021–present ===
Military situation in Myanmar as of 21 December 2024

After the 2021 Myanmar coup, the KIA has refused to recognize the military regime and soon clashes resumed between the KIA and regime troops.

On 25 March, the KIA seized the military base of Alaw Bum near Laiza, which they had lost for over 20 years. On 11 April, the junta military launched an attack to recapture the base using airstrikes and ground troops. The military suffered heavy casualties and had to retreat after a three-day battle.

On 3 May, the Kachin Independence Army said they have shot down a government helicopter near the town of Momauk following days of air raids.

On 7 May, KIA spokesman claimed the military has suffered casualties after regime fighter jets mistakenly dropped bombs at their own troops in Momauk Township.

On 18 May, the KIA ambushed a military convoy and destroyed six tanker trucks near Kutkai Township.

On 22 May, the KIA attacked military positions, and jade mining sites owned by the Myanmar Economic Holdings Ltd (MEHL) in Namtsit Bum in Hkamti Township.

On 25 May, fighting flared up between the KIA and junta troops in Momauk Township, forcing civilians to flee from military shellings.

On 30 May, the KIA joined the anti-coup People's Defence Force (PDF) battling junta troops in Katha Township, killing eight regime soldiers. Fighting was also continuing in Putao, Hpakant and Momauk Township.

== Civilians and refugees ==
Civilians have also been killed in fighting as well as having been specifically targeted. Civilians were often displaced by fighting and faced dangers such as landmines which were frequently laid by government and rebel forces without regard for civilians. Although some civilians had crossed the border with China most remained in northern Burma as of December 2012.

According to Human Rights Watch, refugees were being forced by the Chinese government back into Myanmar in August 2012 despite the continued fighting there and the illegality of forcibly returning civilians to war zones under international law. Women have played a significant role in the conflict as both combatants and victims. Time Magazine documented the presence of many female KIA soldiers in 2012.

In February 2013 the NGO Kachin Women's Association Thailand (KWAT) reported that the fighting had created over 100,000 refugees and that 364 villages had been wholly or partially abandoned since 2011. The organisation's report also stated that the Burmese Army deliberately attacked refugee camps and villages as well as committed alleged "war crimes" such as the rape and murder of civilians.

The United Nations stated on 28 April 2018 that more than 4,000 people were displaced since armed clashes resumed earlier in the month.

== Child soldiers ==
Child soldiers are a major part of the Myanmar Army's and insurgent groups' soldiers. The Independent reported in June 2012 that children were being sold to the Burmese military for "as little as $40 and a bag of rice or a can of petrol". The UN's Special Representative of the Secretary-General for Children and Armed Conflict, Radhika Coomaraswamy, who stepped down from her position a week later, met representatives of the Government of Myanmar on 5 July 2012, and stated that she hoped the government's signing of an action plan would "signal a transformation".

In September 2012, the Tatmadaw (armed forces) released 42 child soldiers and the International Labour Organization met with representatives of the government as well as the Kachin Independence Army to secure the release of more child soldiers. According to Samantha Power, a US delegation raised the issue of child soldiers with the government in October 2012, however, she did not comment on the government's progress towards reform in this area. A Bangkok Post article on 23 December 2012, reported that the Myanmar Armed Forces continued to use child soldiers including during the army's large offensive against the KIA.

== See also ==
- Laiza artillery strike
- Hpakant massacre
