= Laiza Golf Club =

Golf course

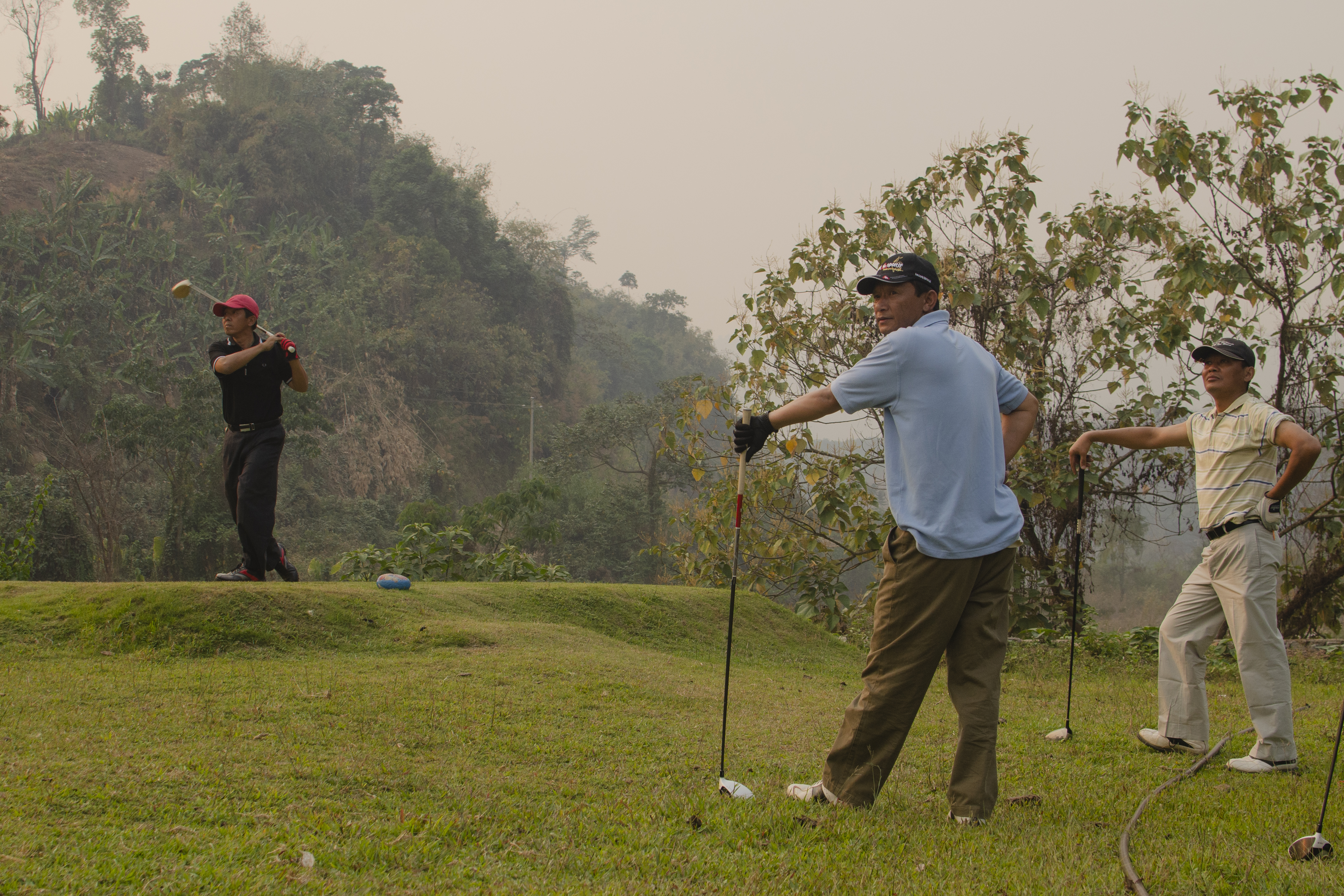
- Gen. Gun Maw drives off of hole 1 at the Laiza golf club

- Location in Myanmar
- 24°45′36″N 97°33′48″E

Club information
- Location: Laiza, Kachin State, Myanmar
- Established: 2004
- Type: Public
- Tota holes: 6
- Tournaments: 4 annual tournaments on holidays, monthly tournaments subject to military conflict
- Designed by: Nay Min

Laiza Golf Club is a golf course and club in Laiza in Kachin State.

== History ==
General Sumlut Gun Maw of the Kachin Independence Army founded the club in 2004 after playing golf at a reconciliation conference in Yangon. The site is by the river which forms the frontier with China. There was formerly a village there but this was destroyed by flooding in 1991. The course was designed by a professional golfer from Myitkyina, Nay Min. Six holes were constructed, starting in 2006, and there are plans to add three holes. This golf course is open to the public for use even during war time. The course consists of 6 holes.

The golfers are mostly army officers or officials of the Kachin Independence Organisation but the course is open to the public and a round costs Ks.1,000/- – about 1 US$. The Laiza golf club is argued to be the cheapest golf club in the world.

== Holes and features ==
The longest hole is 645-yard par 5. Hole 1 is a 358-yard par 4 and hole 4 is a 392-yard par 4. Hole 5 has a memorial to the 1991 flood victims.

The course has 15 sand traps and other hazards including the adjacent banana plantation and river.

There are 8 staff and a clubhouse with refreshments. The caddying is typically performed by girls displaced by incursions of the Burmese army.

== Events ==
There are four tournaments each year which are typically held on holidays. Other tournaments have been held monthly but these may be disrupted by the level of military conflict.
