= Hpakant massacre =

Massacre in Myanmar in 2022

2022 October Hpakant massacre
- Part of the Myanmar civil war (2021–present)
- Location: Anangpa region, Hpakant Township, Kachin State, Myanmar; 25°50′14″N 96°21′51″E
- Target: Kachin Independence Organization; Kachin Independence Army
- Date: 23 October 2022 around 08:40 PM (UTC + 06:30 (MMT))
- Executed by: Myanmar Air Force
- Casualties: At least 80 civilians killed, another unverified number of KIO officials and soldiers killed 80 killed more than 100 injured
- Anangpa, Kachin State

On the night of 23 October 2022, the Myanmar Air Force launched a series of airstrikes in Hpakant Township, Kachin State, Northern Myanmar. The targeted area was within the territory of the Kachin Independence Organization's 9th Brigade in the Anangpa (အနန့်ပါ) area. The airstrikes hit an outdoor concert killing at least 80 civilians, including KIO officials and musical performers.

== Incident ==
According to witnesses, two to three fighter jets flew over an outdoor concert in Anangpa, Hpakant Township around 8pm on 23 October and dropped four bombs onto the location. Those jets were reported to be flown from Mandalay International Airport, which has been deployed with No. 62nd Attack Squadron that mostly composed of Yak-130 fighter/trainer aircraft. The strike was aided by the bright spotlights of the music concert that was being held by Kachin Independence Organization at the time of the attack near the target area. The concert was intended for the 62nd Anniversary ceremony of the founding of KIO. Preliminary death toll counts over 80 people, most of them are civilians who came to the event, including famous Kachin public figures and singers. High-ranking KIO officials and soldiers took a number of casualties as well. And more than 100 were injured. The junta denies the bombings, stating that they had bombed a Kachin army base and acted with the rules of engagement derived from the four Geneva Conventions. Their statement also say that reports of civilian deaths and performers are based on fake, false and extorted news.

Among dozens killed in the brutal attack, actor Lahtaw Zau Ding, singer Aurali, singer Galau Yaw Lwi, pianist Ko King are confirmed killed. The Kachin News Group (KNG) says the organizer of the event invited 9 singers and actors to entertain the audiences for the anniversary celebration of KIO. The strike resulted in the deaths of over 80 civilians who were attending the concert at the time of the strike, making it the single deadliest attack on civilians since the start of the renewed civil war. It was reported that one of the bombs landed near the stage, killing three performers as they were performing.

After the massacre, the security forces at the security gate of Ginsi village stopped the cars taking the injured to Hpakant and Myitkyina.

== Reactions ==
=== International response ===
The United Nations issued a statement expressing deep concern and sadness over the report of excessive and disproportionate use of force against unarmed civilians.

ASEAN Chairman Prak Sokhonn issued a statement on the 25th of October expressing grave concern after the airstrike and recent Insein Prison bombing in Yangon. He observes with alarm and urges restraint and cessation of violence.

Japan's Chief Cabinet Secretary Matsuno Hirokazu condemned the attack in a statement calling for a halt to the violence in Myanmar, a release of detainees including Aung San Suu Kyi and a restoration of the democratic government.

Australian MP Zoe Daniel called for 'immediate' sanctions against Myanmar following the massacre.

=== Domestic response ===
The KIA armed wing flew the flag at half-mast to remember victims of the military air attacks. Sumlut Gun Maw, the leader of KIA, concluded the official letter that is aimed to the Senior General Min Aung Hlaing that "all the tears and cries for those who lost in this air strike would be an invaluable investment".

The junta released a statement denying killing civilians in the air strikes, claiming that the attack was a counter-insurgency operation following all rules of engagement from the Geneva Conventions and that reporting about civilian deaths were fake news. Following the airstrike, the Myanmar Army set up security checkpoints preventing humanitarian aid and first aid responders from entering or leaving Ginsi village, near the site of the airstrike.

The Three Brethren Alliance, also known as the Northern Alliance, has issued a condolence letter to the Kachin Independence Organization/Army. The letter condemns the inhumane air strikes of the junta regime targeting civilians and calls for the international community to take urgent action against the junta regime to prevent further bloodshed.

Other EAOs, including the Karen National Union and Karenni National Progressive Party, condemned the airstrike. Wa State issued a statement expressing dismay at the attack and condolences to the victims of the airstrike. As of the 27th of October, EAOs that have held talk with the junta, including Restoration Council of Shan State, Arakan Liberation Party and Democratic Karen Benevolent Army have remained silent.

== See also ==
- List of massacres in Myanmar
- Laiza artillery strike
- Mo So massacre
