= Laiza massacre =

2023 attack in Kachin by Myanmar Army

- Part of the Myanmar civil war (2021–present)
- Laiza (Myanmar)
- Location: Laiza, Kachin State, Myanmar 24.7540°N 97.35505°E
- Date: 9 October 2023; 11:30 pm MST
- Target: Kachin Independence Organization; Kachin Independence Army
- Deaths: 29+ civilians killed
- Injuries: 57 injured
- Perpetrator: Tatmadaw

On 9 October 2023, the Myanmar military launched an artillery attack targeting an internally-displaced persons (IDP) camp near Laiza, a town in northern Myanmar that serves as the capital of the Kachin Independence Army (KIA). In the massacre, over 29 civilians were killed and 57 were injured. The incident occurred before the anniversary of the Myanmar Air Force's airstrike in Hpakant that killed at least 80 civilians and other KIO officials and soldiers on 23 October 2022.

== Prelude ==
The Myanmar civil war broke out in 2021 following the 2021 Myanmar coup d'état, in which the Tatmadaw deposed the civilian government led by Aung San Suu Kyi. Minority rebel groups across the country, which had all been fighting low-level insurgencies against the government since Burmese independence in 1948, rebelled along with anti-junta civilian groups. One of the groups that rebelled was the Kachin Independence Army of Kachin State, which controlled the state capital of Laiza. 400 people lived in Mung Lai Hkyet prior to the attack.

== Airstrike ==
The airstrike occurred at the Mung Lai Hkyet refugee camp in northern Laiza, at around 11:30 pm local time. Colonel Naw Bu, a spokesman for the KIA, stated that it is unknown how the attack was carried out, as the sound of a jet was not heard overhead prior to the attack. Bu stated that in the attack, 29 people were killed, including 11 children under 16, along with 57 others injured. Kachin Human Rights Watch gave a different toll, of 19 adults killed and 13 children killed. The camp, which had around 100 households at the time of the attack, was "effectively destroyed." Bu also stated that the search for missing individuals was continuing.

== Reactions ==
- United Nations: A spokesperson for United Nations Secretary-General António Guterres expressed alarm at the reports of killings and said he "condemns all forms of violence, including the military's intensifying attacks throughout the country, which continue to fuel regional instability."
- US: State Department said, "We are deeply concerned by reports of a Burma military attack on an internally displaced persons camp near Mung Lai Hkyet village in Kachin State on October 9".
- France: France denounced the attack, calling it a massacre and stating it was "further evidence of the Myanmar security forces' total contempt for international humanitarian law."
- NUG: The NUG condemned the attack, calling it "war crime and crime against humanity".
- Junta: The junta denied responsibility, but claimed that explosions might have occurred in an area used for storage by the KIA. The KIA denounced these claims.
- Kachin Independence Army: The KIA condemned the attack and called the attack a "massacre against our ethnic people.”
- ASEAN: ASEAN deeply concerned over and condemn the bombing. The junta's Foreign Affairs said the ASEAN's statement was misled.

== See also ==
- Hpakant massacre
- Pazigyi massacre
- List of massacres in Myanmar

Similar international events:

- 1991 Amiriyah shelter bombing
- 2019 Hass refugee camp bombing
- 2022 Dedebit Elementary School airstrike by Ethiopia; launched at an IDP camp
- 2023 Jabalia refugee camp airstrikes
  - 31 October 2023 Jabalia refugee camp airstrike
