= Smart weapon =

Smart weapon may refer to:

- Smart munition, or precision-guided munition
- Smart gun, a conceptual firearm that can detect its user
  - Smart bullet, a bullet that can turn, change speed, or send data
- Smart bomb, also known as guided bomb, a bomb that can precisely target a location
- Smart mine, a next-generation land mine that can self-destruct or self-deactivate at the end of a conflict
