= China and the Kachin State =

Kachin State in Myanmar

This article pertains to modern economic, social, and political relations between the People's Republic of China, and the rebel-occupied Kachin State of northern Myanmar. Since the renewal of the Kachin conflict in 2011, violence between the Kachin Independence Army and the Burmese military continues to prevent contact with lowland Burma; China has become the Kachin region's sole window to the outside world. Currently, the majority of activity between Kachin, and the neighboring Chinese province of Yunnan is made up of illicit trading and the illegal migration of refugees.

China holds a significant economic and strategic interest in the region and is heavily invested in development projects including several controversial hydroelectric dams and pipelines. Although officially adhering to a policy of nonintervention, the Chinese government has been very involved in the discourse of the region and often acts as a mediator between the KIA and the Burmese government in Naypyidaw.

== China's involvement in the Kachin conflict ==
=== 2008–2011 ===
During the early years of Myanmar's government transition, China maintained genuine fears over Myanmar's demands towards its ethnic minorities. Most troubling to China was its goal to convert existing rebel groups into Border Guard Forces. Consequentially, the People's Republic of China began to quietly support the KIA as well as the United Wa State Army in the neighboring Shan State. During this period, it is believed that China supplied a significant amount of weapons and military supplies to both of these rebel groups. Although China adamantly denies these claims, rebel troops in both states have been seen using Chinese-made rifles, surface-to-air missiles, and at least 12 armoured vehicles. Officers in the KIA have also mentioned to journalists that their satellite array had once been an unused channel operated by the Chinese military until the KIA purchased it from them in some years ago. While the Chinese government's support for the KIA has ceased almost entirely in recent years, China continues to supply advanced weaponry to the UWSA.

=== 2011: Return of conflict ===
The Chinese funded Dapein Hydroelectric Dam played a significant role in the breaking of a 17-year cease-fire that reignited the violent civil war in the Kachin State. In these early months of the renewed conflict, however, Beijing did not pay much attention to the crisis and turned down the pleas for assistance from the KIA. China wanted to protect their economic interests in the region and no longer wanted to upset the government in Naypyidaw which supported their investments. There was growing suspicion that the KIA was under the influence of western powers and China was losing trust in the predominantly Christian state of Kachin.

=== 2012–present: Negotiations with the Burmese government ===
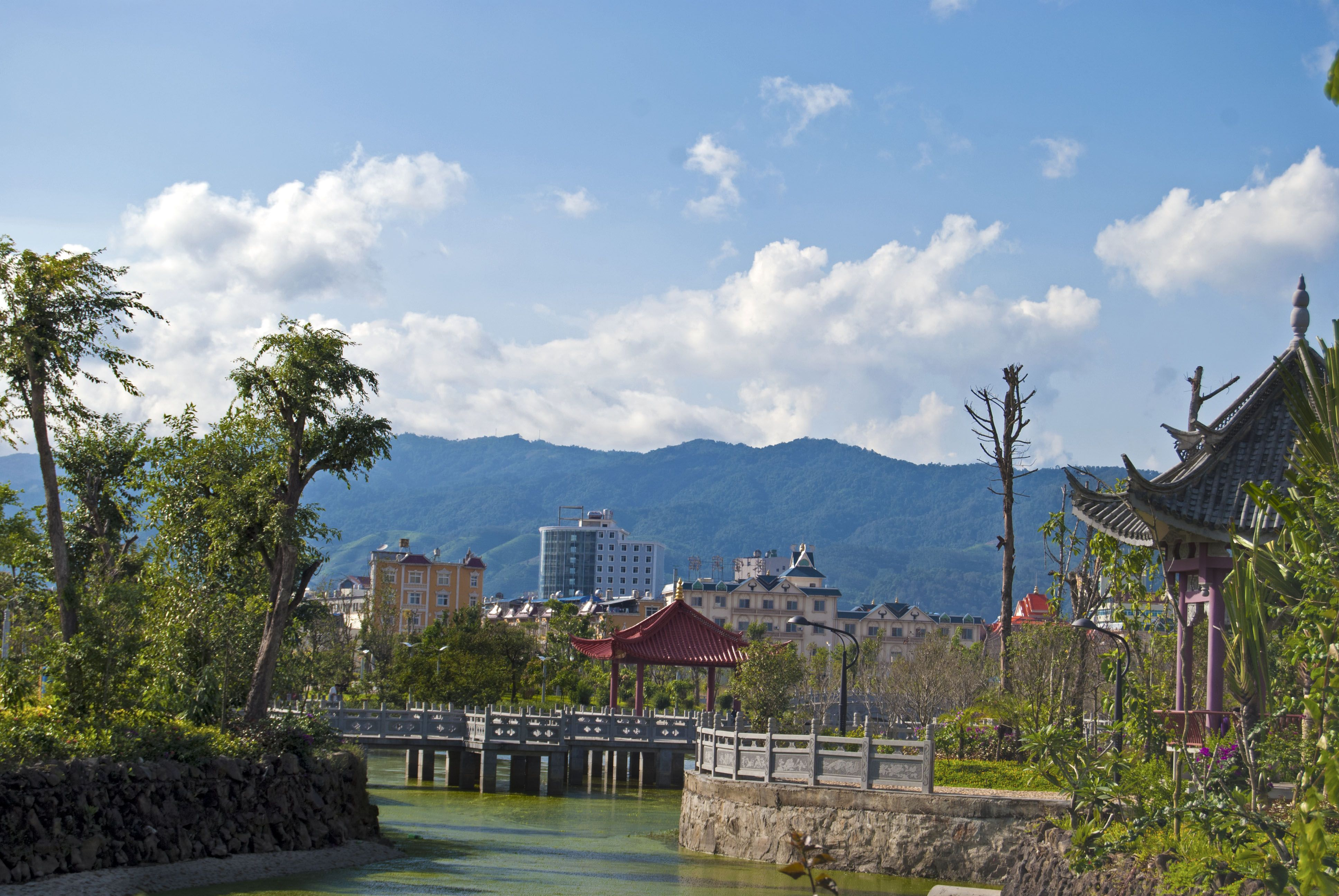
Ruili City, Yunnan, China

Continuous warfare in the area made stable development projects difficult, and tens of thousands of displaced Kachins were trying to escape the combat and seeking refuge in China. In response, China set up nine official refugee camps across the Yunnan province that provided housing for 7,097 Kachins in 2012. The Chinese government has since taken to a mediator role between the KIA and the national government of Myanmar. Between 2011 and 2013, China hosted three out of the five rounds of negotiations that took place between the two warring parties. They also participate in addition to extensive, ongoing behind-the-scenes discussions. These talks have mostly taken place in the city of Ruili, a Chinese border town near Kachin's eastern border in Yunnan and have had varying levels of success. In Ruili, China provides the parties with discrete locations, maximum security, and gentle moderation.

== Chinese investment in Kachin State ==
A multitude of Chinese development projects is scattered throughout the Kachin state. Generally, these projects are large-scale energy endeavours that are funded by Chinese state-owned corporations. Most of the profits and electricity produced through these projects will go back to the People's Republic of China. Because these plans are agreed upon through contracts with the national government of Myanmar and do not directly represent Kachin interests, they are widely unpopular among the KIA and the civilian population.

In 2007, China gained the approval from the Myanmar government to construct a series of seven large dams along the N'Mai River, Mali River, and Irrawaddy River in the Kachin State. The two most notable of these include the Myitsone Hydroelectric Dam and the Dapein Hydroelectric Dam.

=== Myitsone Dam ===
The Myitsone Dam is an enormous hydroelectric power facility that is currently under construction in the upper Kachin State. It is funded by the Chinese Datang Group and is being built by the China Power Investment Corporationalong side a Burmese government contractor at a cost of $3.6 billion. The project will be the first-ever Dam on the culturally and ecologically significant Irrawaddy River and requires that several Kachin villages be relocated further away from the dam site. Like other projects, the Myitsone Dame has caused strong anti-Chinese and anti-Myanmar sentiment in Kachin. On April 16, 2010, three explosives were set off at the site of the dam, killing four Chinese workers and obstructing construction. The KIA claimed no responsibility for the attacks. In response, Burmese President Thein Sein declared that construction on the dam would be halted. However, in March 2012, local villagers were once again forcibly removed from the area by Burmese soldiers and construction was resumed.

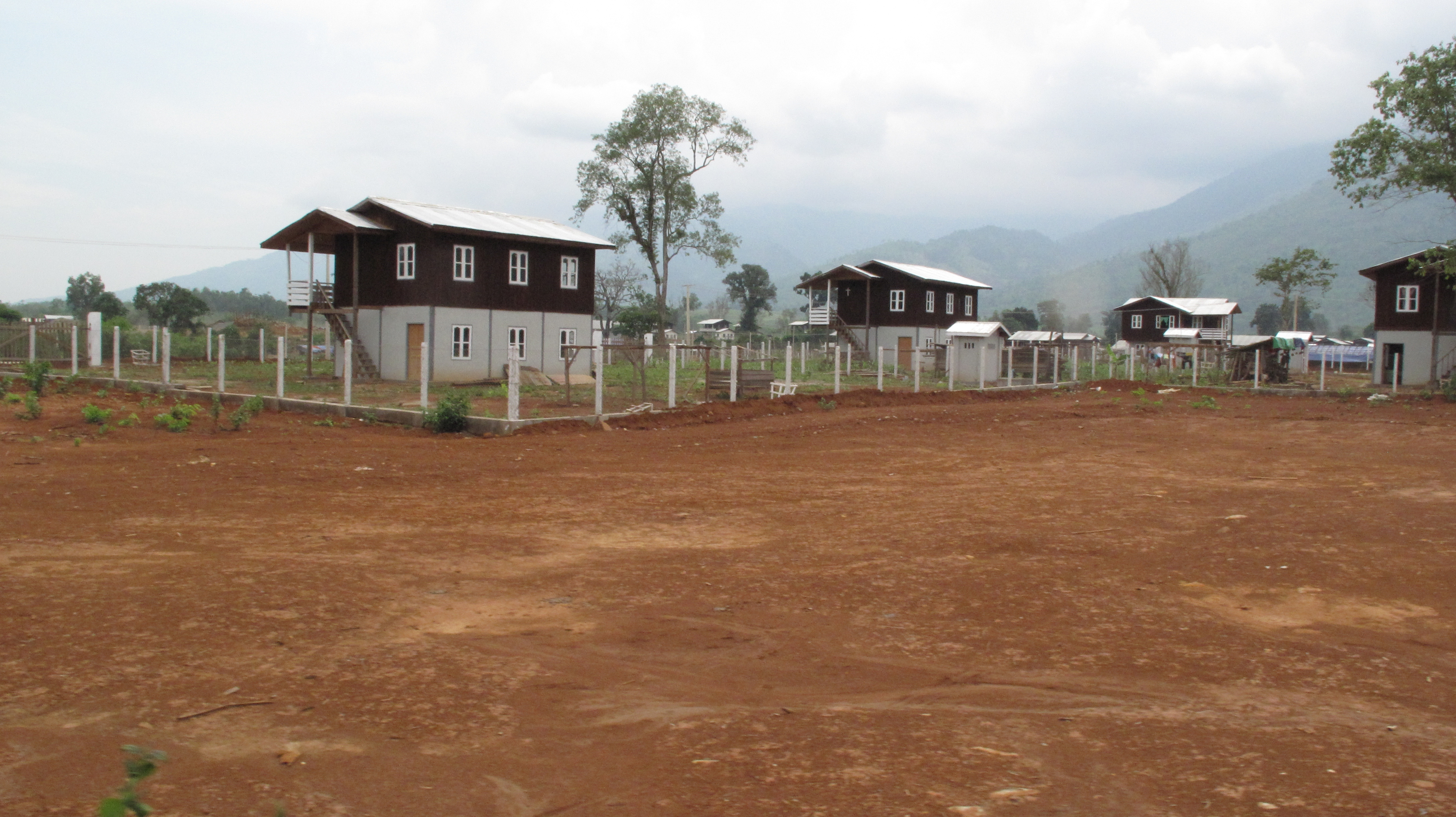
Relocated village Tang Hpre

=== Dapein Dam 1 ===
Dapein Dam 1 is one of two Chinese dam projects located on the N'Mai Kha River in southern Kachin State. Its construction began in 2007 and it began producing power in February 2011 at the cost of 108 million Yuan ($19 million USD). It produced an annual 1,081 Gwh, employed 300 Chinese workers and exported 90% of the electricity produced to China, mainly for use in the Yunnan Province. On June 9, 2011, a battle broke out between the KIA and Burmese national soldiers stationed to protect the dam. The battle represented the breaking of these forces previous cease-fire the power plant was seriously damaged during the incident.

=== Oil and gas pipelines ===
In addition to hydroelectric energy, China has also constructed two massive Sino-Burma pipelines designed to transport crude oil and natural gas to China via the Burmese port city of Kyaukpyu. As it flows into Ruili and central China, the pipeline passes through China near the Kachin-Shan border in a zone where much rebel fighting continues to take place. The project was constructed as a partnership between the Chinese National Petroleum Corporation and the Myanma Oil and Gas Enterprise in 2004 and reduces China's reliance on disputed waterways in the South Pacific to obtain and transport its oil.

=== Jade ===
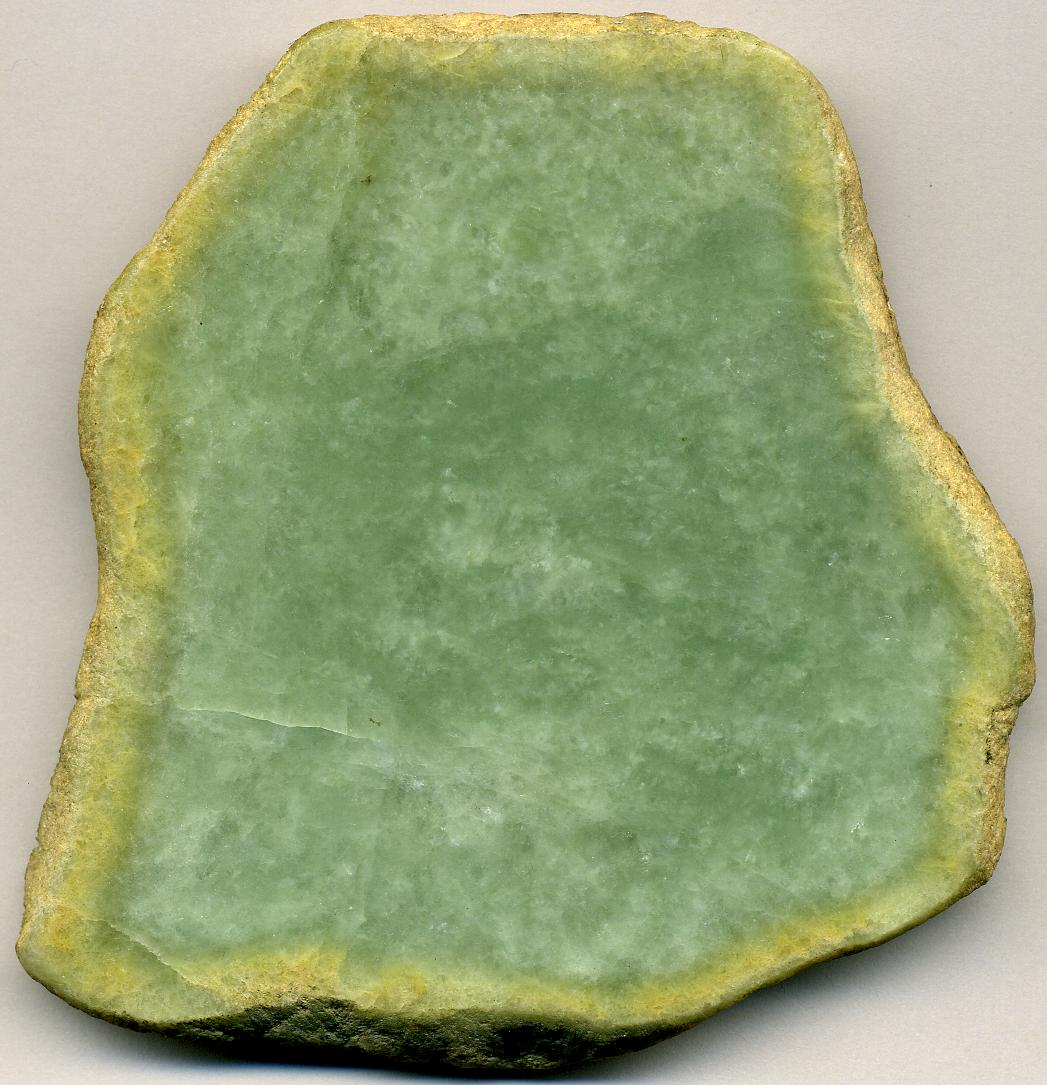
Jadeitite, western Kachin state

Jade production in Myanmar exceeds $900 million each year. The majority of jade in Myanmar is found along the western edge of Kachin and centered around the remote village of Hpakant. Kachin is also regarded as producing some of the highest quality jade in the world. With government presence largely nonexistent in the region, jade mines in the Kachin region tend to be operated either directly by the KIA or local businesses that conduct business primarily through the KIA. Jade is then exported into China where demand for jade is incredibly high. This provides a significant portion of the KIA's funding.

=== Timber ===
The Kachin States vast quantity of wooded forests have attracted many Chinese businessmen who work with the KIA in producing, smuggling, and trading Burmese lumber in China. In the first ten months of 2013 alone, more than two million cubic meters of logs were shipped from Kachin through Ruili. This has contributed to deforestation in the region, as well as a large source of revenue for the rebel army.

== Border disputes ==
The Myanmar-China border is notoriously porous and blurred. Although more than ten million people travel across the official border checkpoint in Ruili each year, there is no wall or guards legitimizing political boundaries anywhere along the border. Because of this, the majority of migrants are thought to enter and exit the countries illegally. For most Kachins, this is a daily routine in order to sell their goods or find work in China.

=== Refugees ===
Tens of thousands of internally displaced persons have fled the fighting in the Kachin State to seek refuge in China and refugee camps. In April 2014, China sent a large number of armed border guards to patrol its border with the Kachin State and part of the Shan State. Additionally, China has closed down its major border checkpoints indefinitely and suspended its acceptance of Burmese refugees into the Yunnan Province.

== See also ==
- Internal conflict in Myanmar
- China–Myanmar relations
