= Hsinbo =

Hsinbo ဆင်ဘို Sinbo
- Location in Burma (Myanmar)
- Coordinates: 24°46′47″N 97°02′32″E
- Country: Myanmar
- Division: Kachin State
- District: Myitkyina District
- Township: Myitkyina Township

Population
  - Religions: Buddhism Christianity
- Time zone: UTC+6.30 (MST)

Hsinbo (also Sinbo) is a town on the Irrawaddy River in Myitkyina Township, Kachin State, Myanmar. The town was seized by the Kachin Independence Army in May 2024 during the Myanmar civil war.
