= Sumlut Gun Maw =

Kachin brigadier general

General Sumlut Gun Maw
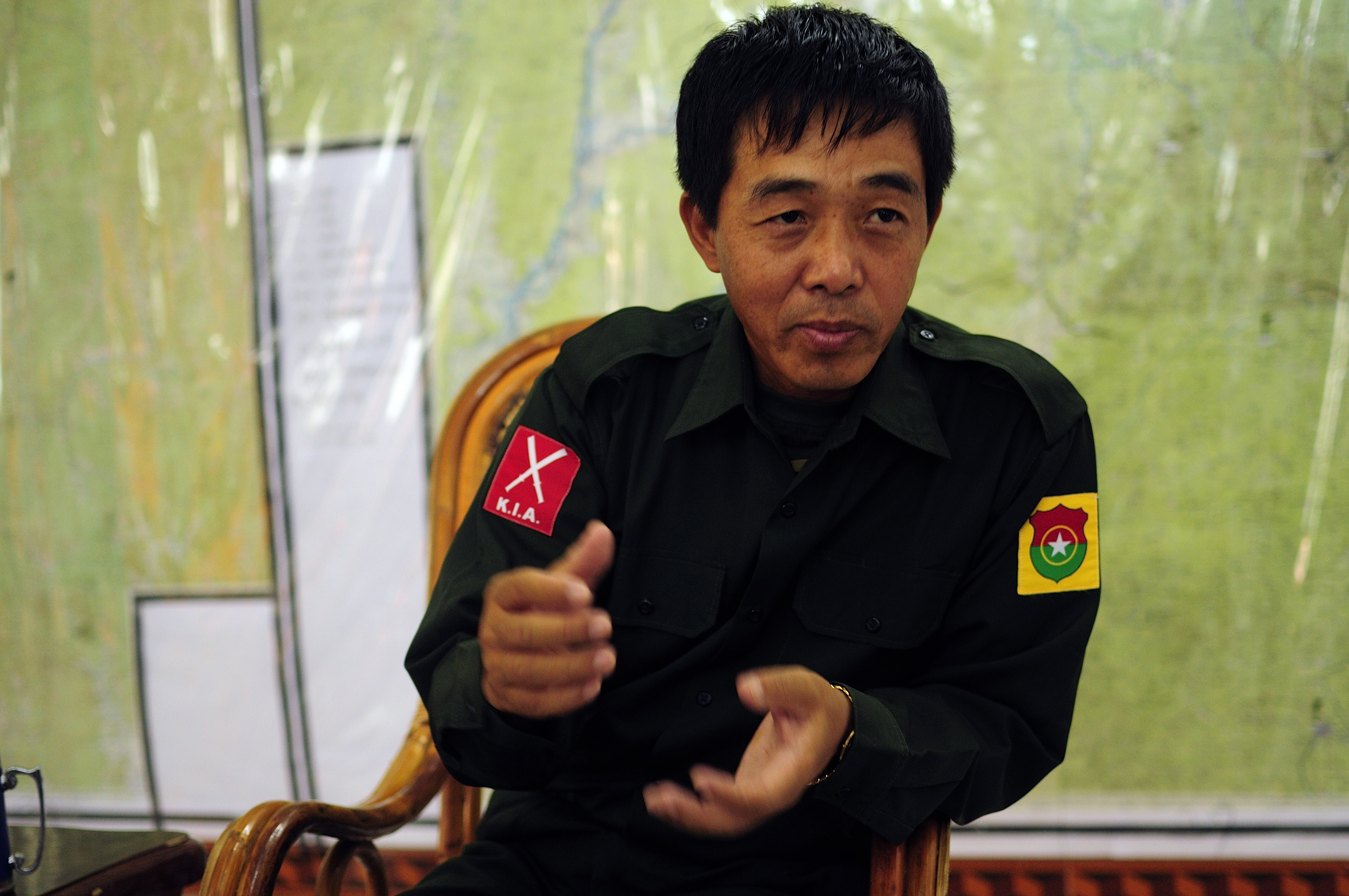
- General Gun Maw at the KIO HQ

Vice Chief of Staff of the Kachin Independence Organization
- Incumbent
- Assumed office 2009

Personal details
- Born: January 5, 1962 (age 64) Myitkyina District, Kachin State, Myanmar
- Education: University of Mandalay
- Occupation: Kachin Revolutionary Leader

Military service
- Branch/service: Kachin Independence Army
- Years of service: 1987–present
- Rank: ?

Sumlut Gun Maw is an officer of the Kachin Independence Army who is currently serving as the vice chief-of-staff with the rank of brigadier general since 2009.

== Early life and education ==
Gun Maw was born on February 5, 1963, in the Dukahtawng district of Myitkyina in Kachin state. He is the eldest among five siblings. He completed high school at No. 1 Basic Education High School, Myitkyina, in 1979. Following this, in December 1979, he began studying at Myitkyina Regional College. Subsequently, in 1987, he earned a BSc in physics from Mandalay University. He is from the Zaiwa ethnic group and speaks Jinghpaw, Burmese, Zaiwa and some English and Chinese.

== Career ==
Following his graduation, he enlisted in the Kachin Independence Army in 1987 as a soldier. He was a front line lieutenant and was promoted to captain before the cease-fire era. He was wounded in combat several times. He became one of the youngest leaders of the Kachin Independence Organization (KIO), after launching several innovative programs.

The Education and Economic Development for Youth (EEDY) program started by then Major Gun Maw. EEDY trains Kachin youth for a multi-month Kachin political history, cultural traditions & Jinghpaw language. Many EEDY graduates joined the KIA/KIO sometime after completing EEDY, bringing in a new generation of leaders to the KIO's ranks.

Aside from his many years as a frontline soldier for the Kachin Independence Army, he holds several key positions within the KIO, such as head of the National Information Services (NIS) and was a key negotiator for the peace talks with the government of Myanmar. He has been very active in improving and reforming the education system of the KIO.

After attending a reconciliation conference in 2004, where he played golf in Yangon, he founded the Laiza Golf Club. In 2009 he was appointed as the vice chief-of-staff with the rank of brigadier general.

When the ceasefire was broken, Gen, Gun Maw opened a public library in Laiza with his own collection of books.

In 2013, he attended peace talks in Myitkyina where he was hailed by thousands of Kachins as the KIA's representative. The talks resulted in a lessening of hostilities but not a complete ceasefire.

In 2017, he assumed the role of vice-chairman of the KIO and participated in the Union Peace Conference - 21st Century Panglong in Naypyidaw as a member of the United Nationalities Federal Council.
