= N'Ban La =

Kachin military leader

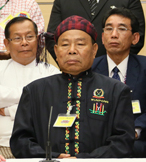
- N'Ban La in 2013

Chairman of the KIO
- In office 27 January 2018 – 2 January 2023
- Preceded by: Lanyaw Zawng Hra
- Succeeded by: Htang Gam Shawng

Vice Chairman of the KIO
- In office 2016–2018
- Preceded by: Gauri Zau Seng
- Succeeded by: Htang Gam Shawng

Chairman of the UNFC
- In office 2011–2016
- Preceded by: Position established
- Succeeded by: Nai Hong Sar

Personal details
- Party: Kachin Independence Organisation

Military service
- Allegiance: Kachin State
- Branch/service: Kachin Independence Army
- Rank: General

N'Ban La is a Kachin political and military leader in Myanmar. He was the chairman of the Kachin Independence Organisation (KIO) and a senior commander of the Kachin Independence Army (KIA), and was formerly the vice chairman of the KIO and the chairman of the United Nationalities Federal Council (UNFC).

== KIO/A leadership ==
In 2001, N'Ban La helped oust then chairman of the KIO Mali Zup Zau Mai in favour of Lamung Tu Jai. As chief of staff of the KIO, N'Ban La removed several senior officers from the KIO's leadership on 7 January 2004; they had intended to oust him and replace him with Lasang Aung Wah. N'Ban La became vice chairman of the KIO in 2016.

N'Ban La was chosen to become chairman of the KIO at the group's 17th central committee meeting on 1 January 2018. He was formally sworn into office on 27 January 2018. In 2 January 2023, he resigned his position due to his health problem. Htang Gam Shawng, who had been the KIA commander-in-chief and KIO chief of staff, succeeded his role.
