= Pajau =

- Town
- Location in Myanmar (Burma)
- Coordinates: 24°52′38″N 97°43′32″E
- Country: Myanmar
- Division: Kachin State
- District: Myitkyina District
- Township: Waingmaw Township
- Time zone: UTC+6.30 (MMT)

Pajau (also spelled Pajau Bum in some sources) is a town in Kachin State, Myanmar. The Kachin Independence Organisation (KIO) previously maintained its headquarters in the town, until it was moved to Laiza in 2005.
