= Hpakant Township =

Coordinates: 25°37′N 96°19′E

Hpakant Township ဖားကန့်မြို့နယ်
- Township
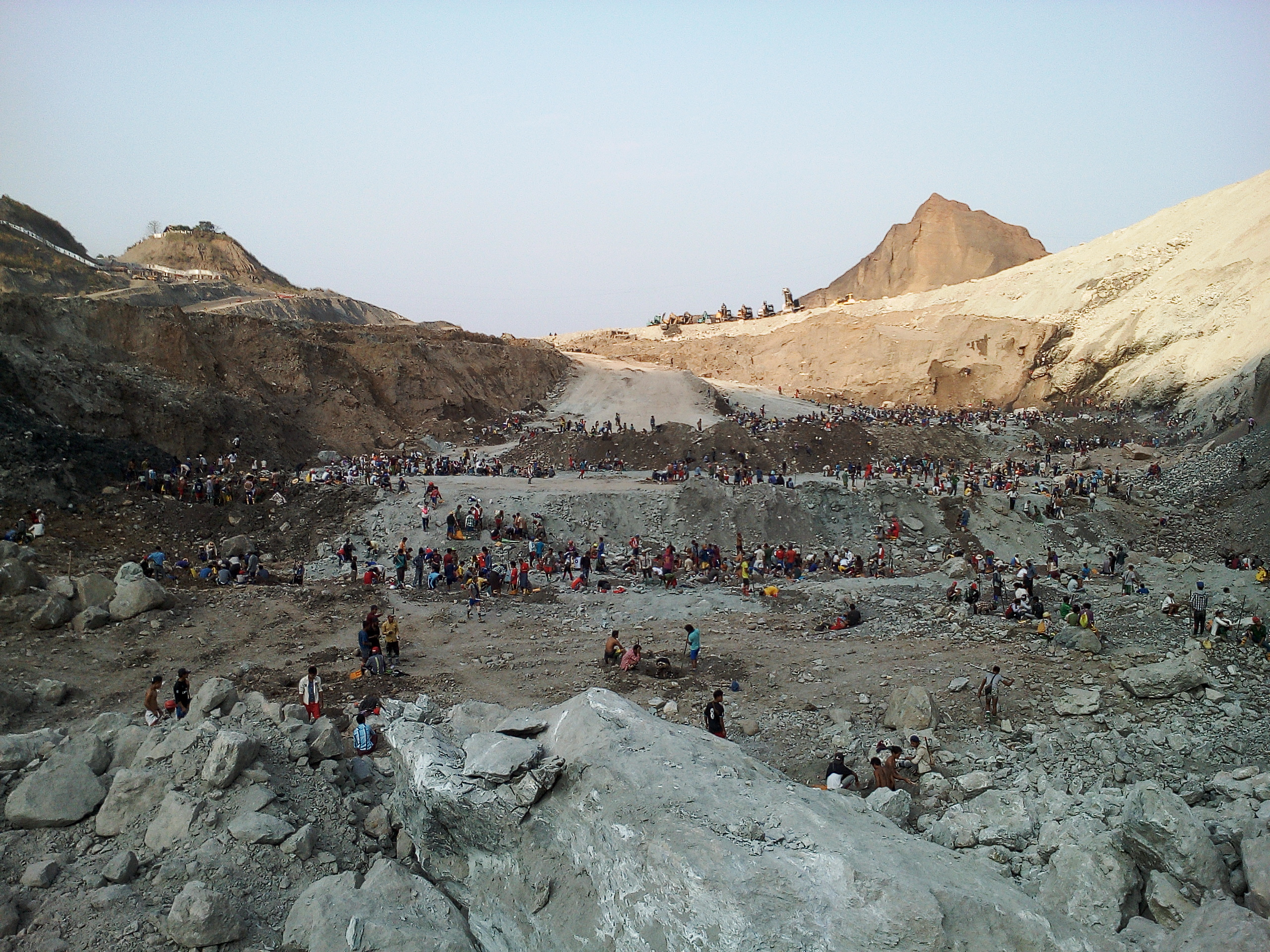

- Location in Mohnyin district
- Country: Myanmar
- State: Kachin State
- District: Mohnyin District
- Time zone: UTC+6:30 (MST)

Hpakant Township (Burmese: ဖားကန့်မြို့နယ်; also Kamaing Township) is a township of Mohnyin District in Kachin State of northern Myanmar . The administrative centre is Hpakant. The major town is Kamaing.

== See also ==
- Hpakant massacre
