= Smart mine =

Proposed land mine designs

Smart mine refers to a number of next-generation land mine designs being developed by military forces around the world. Many are designed to self-destruct or self-deactivate at the end of a conflict or a preset period of time. Others are so-called "self-healing" minefields which can detect when a gap in the field has been created and will direct its mines to reposition themselves to eliminate that gap, making it much more difficult and dangerous to create a safe path through the minefield. The development of smart mines began as a response to the International Campaign to Ban Landmines as a way of reducing non-combatant and civilian injury.

Critics claim that new technology is unreliable, and that the perception of a "safe mine" will lead to increased deployment of land mines in future conflicts. Current guidelines allow for a 10% failure rate, leaving a significant number of mines to pose a threat. Additionally, in the case of self-destructing mines, civilians still are at risk of injury when the mine self-destructs and are denied access to land which has been mined.

As mines are inherently non-discriminate weapons, even smart mines may injure civilians during a time of war. Many critics believe this to be unacceptable under international law. The human security paradigm is outspoken on the issue of the reduction in the use of land mines due to the extremely individual nature of their impact - a facet that is ignored by traditional security concerns which focus on military and state level security issues.

== See also ==
- Land mine
