= Htang Gam Shawng =

Kachin political and military leader

Gunhtang Gam Shawng
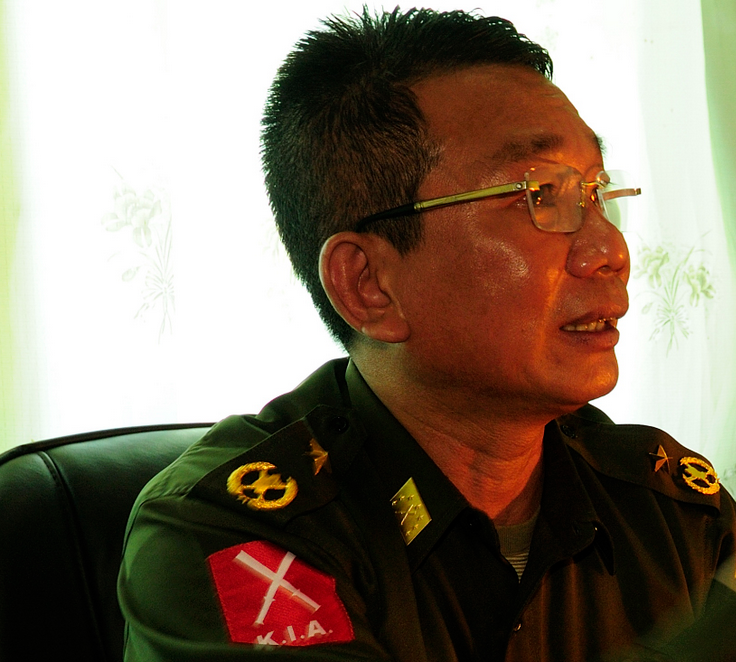
- Gen Gam Shawng of the KIA

Chairman of the Kachin Independence Organisation
- Incumbent
- Assumed office 2 January 2023
- Preceded by: N'Ban La

Commander-in-Chief of the KIO
- In office 27 January 2018 – 2 January 2023
- Preceded by: N'Ban La
- Succeeded by: Hkawng Lum

Personal details
- Party: Kachin Independence Organisation

Military service
- Allegiance: Kachin State
- Branch/service: Kachin Independence Army
- Rank: Lieutenant general

Gunhtang Gam Shawng is a Kachin political and military leader. He is the chairman of the Kachin Independence Organisation (KIO). He previously served as the vice chairman of the KIO and the commander in chief of the KIA, and was succeeded in these roles by Hkawng Lum. Gam Shawng was also previously the chief of staff of the KIO.

Gam Shawng almost never joins meetings with the Burmese authorities unless the Burmese top general also joins. Gam Shawng strongly opposes the 2008 Constitution of Myanmar, which he uses as his foot rest in his office.
