= Laiza =

Laiza လိုင်ဇာ
- Town
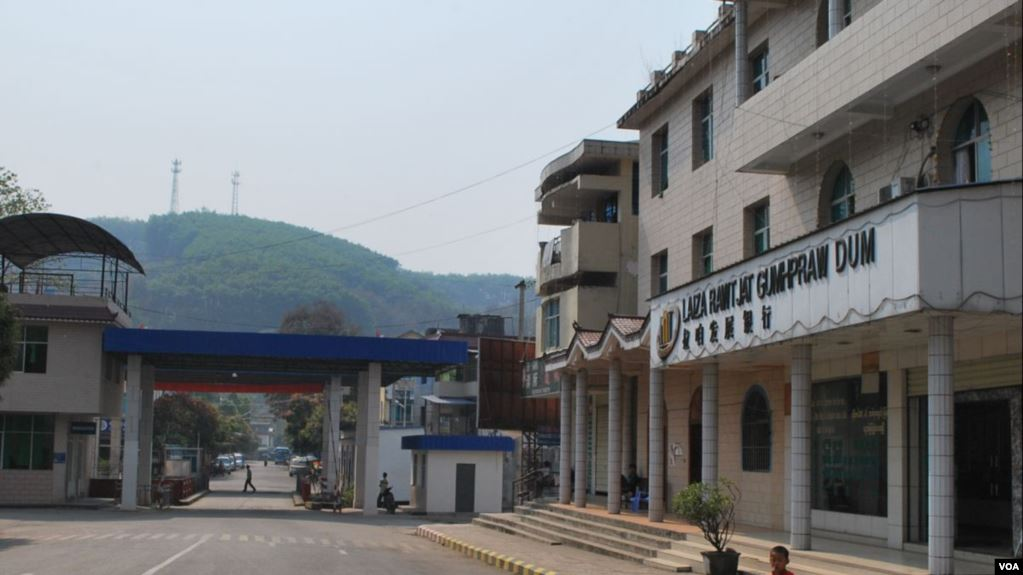

- Location in Myanmar (Burma)
- Coordinates: 24°45′36″N 97°33′48″E
- Country: Myanmar
- Division: Kachin State
- District: Myitkyina District
- Township: Waingmaw Township
- Control: Kachin Independence Army
- Time zone: UTC+6.30 (MMT)

Laiza (Burmese: လိုင်ဇာ, romanized: Laingza, Chinese: 拉咱; pinyin: Lāzá) is a remote mountainous town in the Kachin State, Myanmar (Burma). It lies on the China-Myanmar border, with Nabang, Yingjiang County located across the border. Laiza is the headquarters of the Kachin Independence Organisation since 2005.

== History ==
Laiza was just a village prior to 1994. It became an important town in Kachin State after the Kachin Independence Organization signed a ceasefire agreement with the State Peace and Development Council and moved its headquarters there from Pajau. Leaders representing different ethnic groups in Myanmar attended the Laiza Conference in October 2013, searching for common ground amongst ethnic groups and the Burmese government in preparation for further peace talks and the eventual creation of the Nationwide Ceasefire Agreement in 2015.

The Kachin Independence Army currently controls Laiza.
