= Kachin Independence Organisation =

Kachin Independence Organisation ကချင်လွတ်လပ်ရေးအဖွဲ့ချုပ် Wunpawng Gumrawng Gumtsa Mungdan
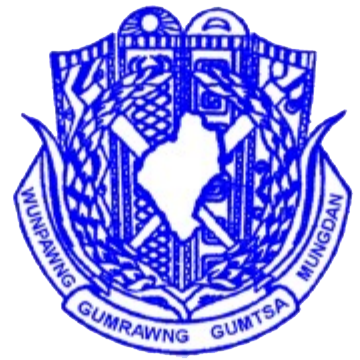
- Abbreviation: KIO
- Chairman: N'Ban La
- Vice chairmen: Gam Shawng; Sumlut Gam
- Deputy chairmen: Gun Maw; Zong Buk Htan
- Founded: 1960
- Headquarters: Laiza (since 2005); Pajau (formerly)
- Armed wing: Kachin Independence Army
- Ideology: Kachin self-determination Federalism

Party flag

The Kachin Independence Organisation (abbreviated KIO; Burmese: ကချင်လွတ်လပ်ရေးအဖွဲ့ချုပ်; Kachin: Wunpawng Gumrawng Gumtsa Mungdan, lit. "Sovereign Kachin nation state") is a Kachin political organisation in Myanmar (Burma), established on 5 February 1961. It has an armed wing, the Kachin Independence Army, which operates in Kachin and Shan State.

== History ==
In post-independence Burma, the Kachin people had been signatories to the Panglong Agreement and were generally loyal. However, by 1960 the dissent had grown, in part as new Kachin leaders born after World War II began to win the support of prominent community leaders, students and other youth. In 1960 two Kachin dissidents and ex-soldiers of the Burma Army, Lamung Tu Jai and Lama La Ring, contacted fellow dissident Zau Seng and founded the Kachin Independence Organisation. Zau Seng was a veteran of the two-month long Pawng Nawng rebellion and cathered other retired veterans from the 1948–50 era. Zau Seng became the first leader of the KIO, Zau Tu became the first deputy leader, and Lama La Ring became the first secretary. They provided the KIO with ammunition to form a 27-member private army.

On 5 February 1960, the KIO's private army raided a bank, among other activities. When Burmese authorities began responding to the KIO's actions, many young Kachin dissidents went underground to join the KIO. A year later on 5 February 1961, the KIO's 100-strong private army was reorganised into the Kachin Independence Army (KIA) and became the KIO's armed wing, with Zau Seng as commander in chief. Following the 1962 Burmese coup d'état, the KIO expanded its armed wing with new recruits, who dissented against the new military junta under General Ne Win.

The KIO was initially seen as a radical leftist movement. In 1964, the KIO banned the traditional Gumsa feudal village system, with many traditional headmen killed in the upheaval transitioning into a more "democratic" Gumlao system of local administration. However, it became clear that the KIO was a staunchly nationalist organization and that the Gumlao system served to cement intensely loyal clan systems across Myanmar and the world in the coming decades of war. The KIO also became a safe haven for smaller insurgent groups. Their training eventually formed major ethnic armed organizations, most notably the Arakan Army.

Soldiers from Myanmar's Tatmadaw (armed forces) fought KIA insurgents for over 33 years until a ceasefire was brokered between the two opposing sides in 1994. During the ceasefire, the KIO established intimate ties with the central military and appeared to lose its revolutionary fervor becoming more concerned with the spoils of its lucrative ceasefire economy. International observers thought they had been weakened by self-interest, opportunism and corruption. By working with the KIA, the Tatmadaw capitalized on the resource-rich lands under KIO control providing limited recognition in exchange for access to and security of resources like jade, teak and rubber. The ceasefire lasted for 17 years until June 2011, when the Tatmadaw resumed operations against the KIA. Despite appearances during the ceasefire, the KIO resurged after 2011 and has continued to make uncompromising political demands and display more disciplined military and organizational strength. The KIO had spent the 17 years building up its legitimacy using grassroots methods, and used its newfound riches to build up its military from a guerilla force to a professionalized army.

Aside from its major towns and railway corridor, KIO/A-controlled areas in Kachin State remained virtually independent and isolated from the rest of Myanmar from the mid-1960s through 1994, with an economy based on cross-border jade trade with China and narcotics trafficking. In 2005, the KIO moved its headquarters from Pajau to Laiza, and established a military academy and training school.

== Services ==
The KIO operate an education system in areas under their control, running over 200 schools. Until 2010, KIO operated secondary schools remained in contact with the Ministry of Education. Students of KIO schools who passed the 9th Standard to take their final 10th Standard examination at a government school and attend university afterwards. In response to the central government cutting ties with KIO schools, the KIO opened Mai Ja Yang National College as its first tertiary education school in 2015.

== Funding ==
The KIO funds most of its armed wing's activities through the cross-border trade with China of jade, timber and gold. Money is also raised through KIA-imposed taxes on locals.
