= Nawngwao =

Longkam
- Village
- Location within Myanmar
- Coordinates: 23°52′N 98°21′E
- Country: Burma
- State: Shan State
- District: Mu Se District
- Township: Mu Se Township
- Elevation: 3,634 ft (1,108 m)
- Time zone: UTC+6:30 (MMT)

Nawngwao is a village in Mu Se Township, Mu Se District, northern Shan State.

== Geography ==
Nawngwao lies in a valley, 1 km northeast of Longkam. Nawnghoi, a mountain with a rocky summit that rises to a height of 1,936 m (6,352 ft), is located about 3 km to the ENE of the village.
