= Kutkai District =

Kutkai Township Kutkai District ကွတ်ခိုင်မြို့နယ် ကွတ်ခိုင်ခရိုင်
- Township and District
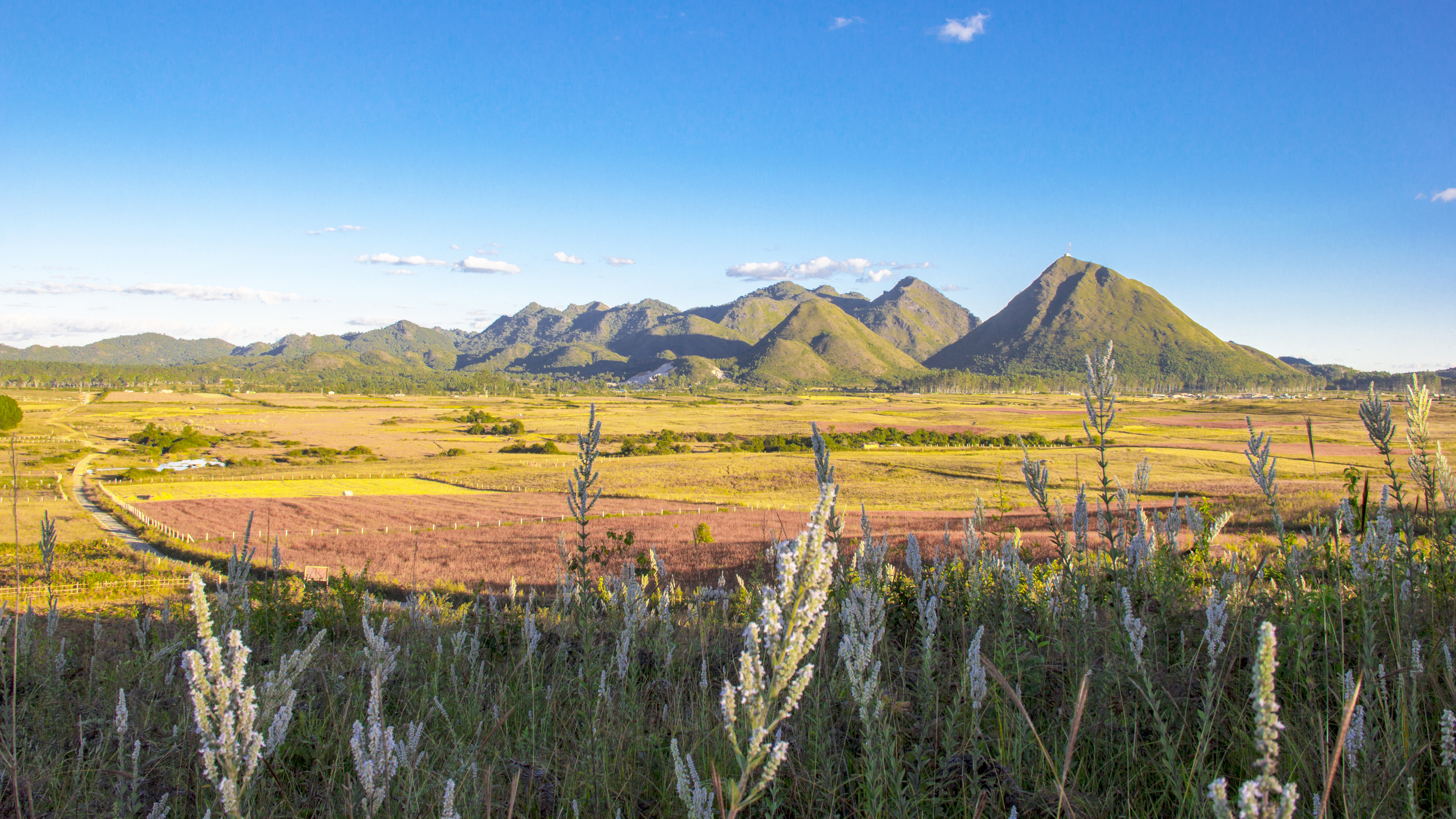
- Loi Sam Sip mountain range

- Location in Shan State
- Coordinates: 23°27′0″N 97°55′0″E
- Country: Myanmar
- State: Shan State
- District: Kutkai District

Area
  - Total: 1,161.5 sq mi (3,008.4 km^{2})
- Elevation: 4,600 ft (1,400 m)

Population (2014)
  - Total: 101,334
  - Density: 87.240/sq mi (33.684/km^{2})
- Time zone: UTC+6:30 (MMT)

Kutkai Township (Burmese: ကွတ်ခိုင်မြို့နယ်) is the only township of Kutkai District (Burmese: ကွတ်ခိုင်ခရိုင်) in northern Shan State, eastern Myanmar. The principal town is Kutkai.

== Geography ==
It shares the border with Laukkaing Township (Laukkai Township) of Laukkaing District in the east. It shares the borders with Muse Township in the north, Kunlong Township and Salween River in the east, Hsenwi Township in the south, Nanhkan Township (Namkham Township) and Namtu Township in the west. it was formed with 6 wards, 75 village tracts and 640 villages on 15 July 1972. It has 16 wards, 69 village tracts and 463 villages in 2009.

In 2022, the Ministry of Home Affairs promoted the township to its own district, splitting the township from Mu Se District. The township has 1 subtownship- the Tarmoenye subtownship, an informal subdivision used for administrative and statistical purposes centred on the town of Tarmoenye.

It has rain from May to October and average rainfall of 70 inches (1,800 mm) in 119 days a year. Its attitude is over 4,400 feet (1,300 m) above sea level and its temperature is not over 30 °C (86 °F). It is 7.06 square miles (18.3 km^{2}).

== Economy ==
Kutkai Township's major business is agriculture and livestock breeding. Paddy, corn, groundnut, sesame, sunflower, black gram, green gram, pigeon peas, cotton and sugarcane are grown. tea, walnut, coffee, rubber and tapioca are grown as poppy substitutes. It has 92,491 acres of arable lands. Paddy fields are about 16,882, other crops are 36,645 acres, hilly farmlands are 6,850 acres and gardens are 31,869 acres.

It has 11,145 acres of forest reserved, 469,169 acres of protected forest and 6,160 acres of teak plantation. About 44% of township area is covered with forests.

=== Drugs trade ===
Kutkai Township is also a major center of the drug trade in Myanmar. 44 counter-narcotics raids conducted between 20 February and 9 April 2020 yielded over US$200 million in illicit drugs and precursor chemicals, including 200 million tablets of methamphetamine, 1,120 pounds of crystal methamphetamine, 630 pounds of heroin, almost 300 pounds of raw opium, 640 pounds of opium poppy and 990 gallons of methyl fentanyl. In response, the Burmese army detained Kachin Defence Army leaders and seized about 1,000 weapons.

== Politics ==
The Kachin Defense Army (KDA), also known as the Kaungkha militia, a splinter group of the Kachin Independence Army is active in the township. In 2010, the KDA was converted into a Border Guard Force.

In the lower house of Myanmar's national legislature, the Pyithu Hluttaw, Kutkai Township has been represented by T Khun Myat, the incumbent House Speaker, since 2010. Before his entry into politics, he was the former head of the Kutkai militia from 1990 to 2010. In the upper house, the Amyotha Hluttaw, Kutkai Township is represented by Nyi Sein, who represents Shan State Constituency No. 5, which also includes Muse and Namkham Townships.

== Demographics ==
=== 2014 ===
Historical Population
Year	Pop.	±%
1973		—
1983		—
2014	101,334	—
Source: Ministry of Labor, Immigration, and Population data

The 2014 Myanmar Census reported that Kutkai Township had a population of 101,334. The population density was 33.7 people per km^{2}. The census reported that the median age was 21.3 years, and 98 males per 100 females. There were 19,031 households; the mean household size was 5.1 .

=== Ethnic makeup ===
Kutkai is inhabited by several groups, including the Mong Wong, Palaung, Kachin, and Shan.

Ethnic composition of Kutkai Township
Ethnic group	Percentage
Mong Wong	28.6%
Ta’ang (Palaung)	24.5%
Kachin	23.5%
Others	15.6%
Shan	7.8%
Source: 2019 GAD township report

== Services ==
There are 4 high schools, 1 high school (branch), 5 middle schools, 3 middle schools (branch), 20 post-primary schools and 102 primary schools. There are 2 hospitals of 25 beds, 3 hospitals of 16 beds, 7 rural health care centers, 35 rural health care centers (branch) and 2 station health care centers.
