= 2026 Namhkam Township explosion =

Explosion in Myanmar

- Part of Myanmar civil war
- Kaung Tat (Myanmar)
- Native name: ၂၀၂၆ နမ့်ခမ်း ပေါက်ကွဲမှု
- Date: 31 May 2026
- Time: c.12:00 p.m. (MMT (UTC+6:30))
- Location: Kaung Tat, Namhkam Township, Shan State, Myanmar; 23.8429437°N 97.7079612°E
- Type: Explosion
- Cause: Accidental detonation of explosives: under investigation
- Deaths: 43
- Injuries: 112

On 31 May 2026, a major explosion occurred at a building storing explosives used for mining in Namhkam Township, Shan State, Myanmar. The explosion occurred in territory controlled by the Ta'ang National Liberation Army (TNLA), one of the rebel groups fighting in the country's ongoing civil war. The explosion largely leveled Kaung Tat village, killing more than 46 people and injuring more than 112 people.

== Background ==
The Ta'ang National Liberation Army (TNLA) is the military wing of the Palaung State Liberation Front, a political organisation in Myanmar representing the Ta'ang people in the country. The TNLA has been fighting the Tatmadaw since 1963, but a ceasefire went into effect for 30 years in 1991. Following the Tatmadaw coup in Myanmar in 2021, the TNLA resumed fighting as one of the many rebel groups in the Burmese Civil War. Initially a low-profile force, they began to rise in prominence following the launching of Operation 1027, a major offensive on behalf of an alliance between them and two other rebel groups in the northeast of the country, in October 2023. Shortly after its initiation, Namhkam was seized by the TNLA.

As the long-running insurgencies in Myanmar have raged on, and especially following the eruption of civil war, many of the country's resource-rich areas have fallen into the hands of various rebel groups. Resource extraction operations in these areas are often unregulated, and disasters are frequent. Mining operations in the country often have Chinese involvement, with the country maintaining close relations with both the ruling Tatmadaw government and the various rebel groups. The TNLA and Tatmadaw established a China-brokered ceasefire between one another in late 2023, but instability remains a pressing issue. Both the Tatmadaw and TNLA earn income from mining operations.

== Explosion ==
Namhkam Township is located in Shan State, close to the border with China. According to unverified statements from interviews of anonymous locals by the Associated Press, the local mines in the area are jointly owned and operated by the TNLA and Chinese business interests, with most locals not being permitted access.

The explosion occurred at a TNLA ammunition depot near Kaung Tat village. The force of the explosion damaged more than 200 buildings near the site. News reporters on the ground, rescuers and residents said the village was "completely destroyed", with limbs and bodies everywhere. Another 100 homes were damaged in the nearby Pan Lone village.

=== Casualties ===
Initially, 15 people were reported killed, but different news outlets are reporting anywhere from 55 to 65 killed with 74 injured and multiple missing. A rescue worker at the scene told the Associated Press that 46 bodies, including 6 children, were recovered by evening and were taken for cremation. Another rescuer said 59 people were killed. Myanmar media outlets reported death tolls ranging from 50 to 55. Rescue teams told BBC News that at least 46 people had been killed; 6 children including a one-year-old toddler were among the dead. Among the dead included 3 Chinese nationals. On 1 June, a spokesperson for the TNLA put the death toll at 39 with another 75 injured, much lower than other estimates. On 1 June, recovery operations were still ongoing, with more than a dozen rescue and charity groups using excavation machinery to dig out bodies. Determining the exact death toll would be difficult, as several bodies were blown apart from the force of the explosion.

Search and rescue operations are ongoing to rescue people trapped under rubble.

The injured victims were transported to Namhkam General Hospital, where blood was urgently needed. Nearly a dozen social welfare organizations from Namhkam and Muse were involved in rescue efforts, searching for bodies and recovering the injured.

An official statement was issued regarding the number of fatalities and injured victims. A total of 43 people were killed, including 36 individuals aged over 11 years and 7 children under 11 years. Of the fatalities, 36 occurred at the scene, while seven individuals later died in the hospital.

== Cause and reactions ==
The Palaung State Liberation Front issued a statement saying that the explosion was not caused by a military attack, but rather an accidental detonation of gelignite stored for mining use. Gelignite can be used in rock blasting and mining, but can become unstable if improperly stored. They expressed sympathy for the victims and announced a thorough investigation, and stated that they would "hold those responsible accountable."

The TNLA established the Kaung Tat Village Rehabilitation Committee to oversee several donations sent to aid and rehabilitate the village and others affected by the explosion. The Kachin Independence Organisation, a nearby rebel government, donated 50 million Myanmar kyat.

On 10 June, Arakan Army donated 10 Million Kyats for reconstruction of the area damaged due to the blast.

== See also ==
- 2011 Yangon explosion
- N'Djamena ammunition depot explosions (2024)
- List of accidents and incidents involving transport or storage of ammunition
