= Kaung Tat =

Kaung Tat Kaungtup
- Village
- Kawngtat
- Location in Myanmar
- Coordinates: 23°50′34″N 97°42′12″E
- County: Myanmar
- State: Shan State
- District: Mu Se District
- Township: Namhkam Township
- Village Tract: Mant Nawng

Population (2014)
  - Total: 683
- Time zone: UTC+6.30 (MMT)

Kaung Tat or Kaungtup, officially Kawng Tat (Burmese: ကောင်းတပ်, Burmese pronunciation: [káʊɰ̃.taʔ]), is a village in the Mant Nawng village tract in Namhkam Township in northern Shan State, Myanmar. As of the 2014 Myanmar census, the village tract of Mant Nawng had a population of 683 people.

On 31 May 2026, a major explosion occurred near Kaung Tat at a Ta'ang National Liberation Army ammunition depot. The force of the explosion damaged more than 200 houses near the site. News reporters on the ground, rescuers and residents said the village was "completely destroyed", with limbs and bodies everywhere. The TNLA established the Kaung Tat Village Rehabilitation Committee, overseeing distributing aid and donations to the victims.
