= Longkam =

- Village
- Location within Myanmar
- Coordinates: 23°51′N 98°20′E
- Country: Burma
- State: Shan State
- District: Mu Se District
- Township: Mu Se Township
- Elevation: 3,467 ft (1,057 m)
- Time zone: UTC+6:30 (MMT)

Longkam is a village in Mu Se Township, Mu Se District, northern Shan State, Myanmar (Burma).

== Geography ==
Longkam lies in a valley, 1 km southwest of Nawngwao. Nawnghoi, a mountain with a rocky summit that rises to a height of 1,936 m (6,352 ft), is located about 4 km to the northeast of the village. The elevation is 1,057 m.
