= Kawnghka =

Kawnghka ကောင်းခါး
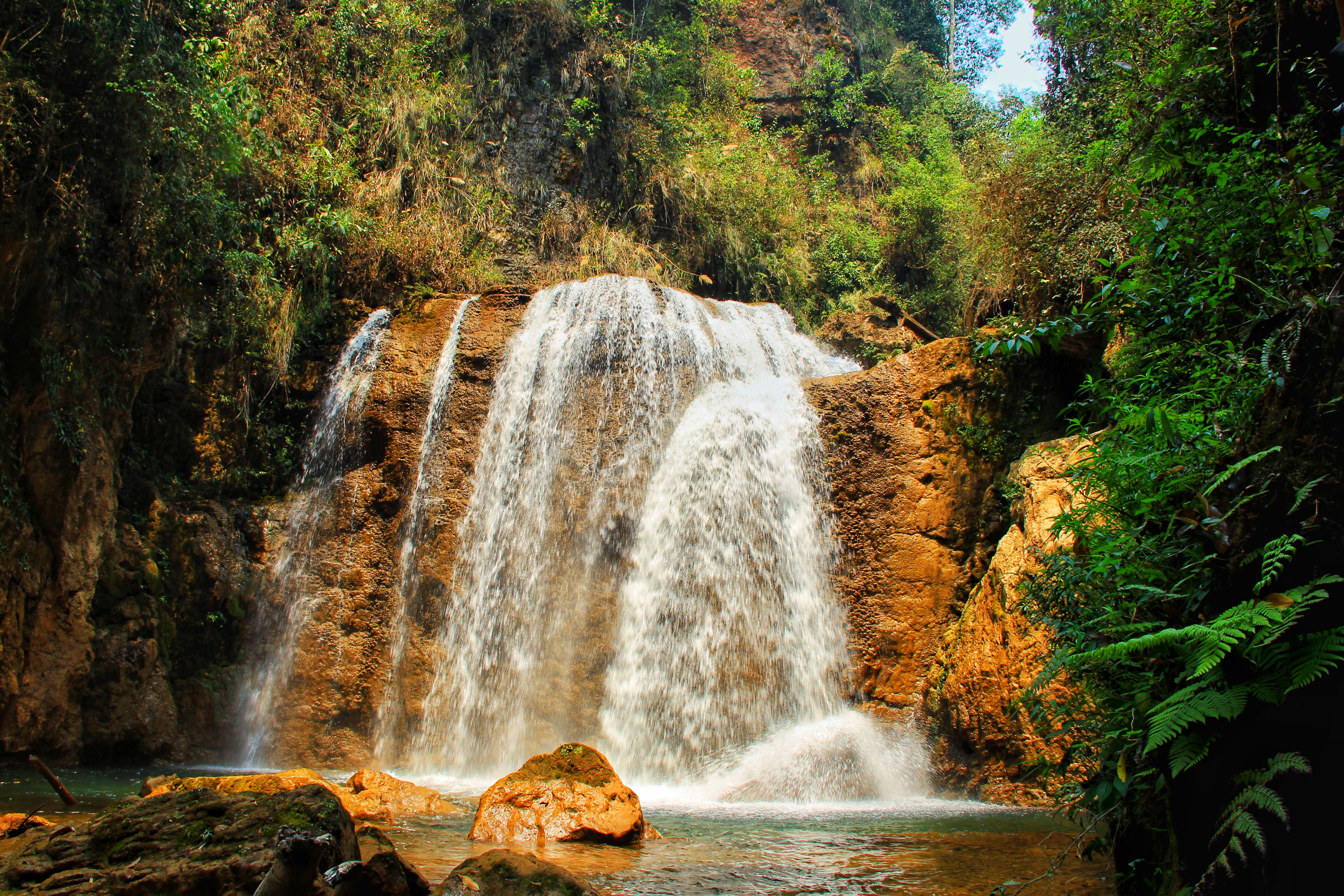
- Kawnghka waterfall

- Location in Myanmar (Burma)
- Coordinates: 23°27′0″N 98°2′0″E
- Country: Myanmar
- Division: Shan State
- District: Mu Se District
- Township: Kutkai Township
- Time zone: UTC+06:30 (MMT)

Kawnghka (Burmese: ကောင်းခါး; Shan: ၵွင်းၶႃး) is a village in Shan State, Myanmar (Burma). It is the headquarters of the Kachin Defense Army (KDA).
