= Song Möng Sihsu =

- Village
- Location within Myanmar
- Coordinates: 23°53′N 98°24′E
- Country: Burma
- State: Shan State
- District: Mu Se District
- Township: Mu Se Township
- Elevation: 3,751 ft (1,143 m)
- Time zone: UTC+6:30 (MMT)

Song Möng Sihsu is a village in Mu Se Township, Mu Se District, northern Shan State.

== Geography ==
Song Möng Sihsu lies in a mountainous area, 1.3 km west of the Salween, at the foot of Nawnghoi, a mountain with a rocky summit that rises to a height of 1,936 m (6,352 ft) to the west above the village.
