= Kumpa =

- Village
- Location within Myanmar
- Coordinates: 24°3′N 98°9′E
- Country: Burma
- State: Shan State
- District: Mu Se District
- Township: Mu Se Township
- Elevation: 5,660 ft (1,730 m)
- Time zone: UTC+6:30 (MMT)

Kumpa is a village in Mu Se Township, Mu Se District, northern Shan State.

== Geography ==
Kumpa lies in the middle of a mountainous area, 1.5 km southwest of Panglong.
