= Mong-Yu =

Mong-Yu Burmese: မုန်းယူး
- Town
- Location in Myanmar (Burma)
- Coordinates: 23°58′23″N 97°59′00″E
- Country: Myanmar
- State: Shan State
- District: Mu Se District
- Township: Mu Se Township
- Time zone: UTC+6.30 (MMT)

Mong-Yu (Burmese: မုန်းယူး) is a town in northern Shan State in Myanmar near the Chinese border. Mong-Yu is the location of the 105th mile trade zone. In 2019, it had a population of 1,730.

== History ==
=== World War II ===
During World War II, Mong-Yu was the junction of the Ledo and Burma Roads. In January 1945, the Chinese 30th and 38th Divisions moved southeast towards Namhkam and met up at Mong-Yu. Mong-Yu was occupied by the Japanese 56th Division, but the 56th soon retreated to Mandalay. On 20 January, the 38th met up with soldiers of Y force. The captured of Mong-Yu allowed for the opening of another route to China, with the first Allied convoy from Ledo passing through Mong-Yu on 28 January. The area also marked a meeting of American and Chinese forces in January 1945.

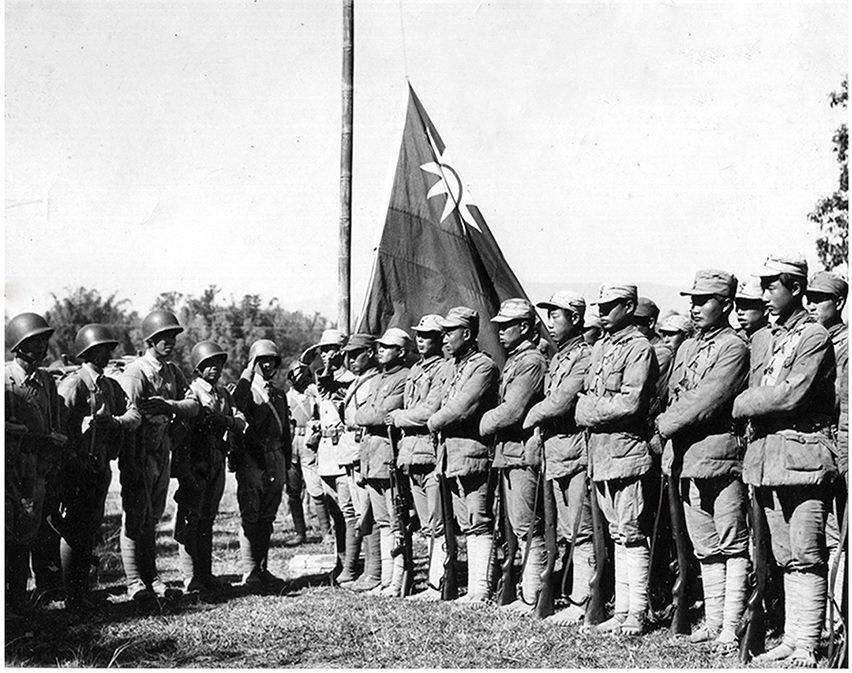
Chinese forces at Mong-Yu

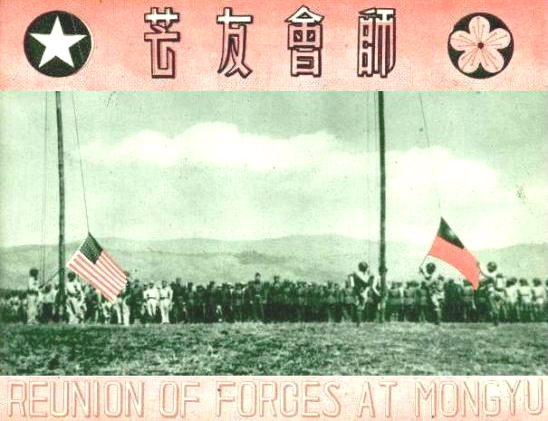
Reunion of the Chinese Expeditionary Force and Allied armies in January 1945

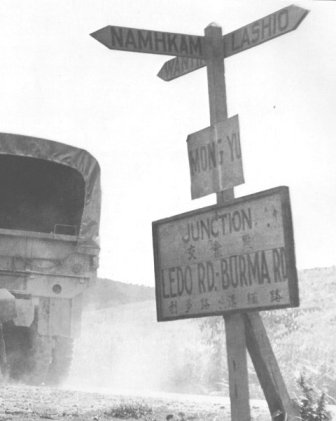
Junction of the Ledo and Burma road

=== Under Myanmar government ===
In 2009 and 2010, the Myanmar government announced the integration of ethnic armed groups into the Border Guard Force (BGF) scheme. Under the scheme, Mong-Yu came under the control of pro-government militias, particularly members of Lahu and Jakuni militias.

In August 2019, clashes between the Tatmadaw and the Three Brotherhood Alliance near Mong-Yu resulted in few motor shells falling on Mong-Yu which, although nobody was hurt, prevented residents from accessing the hospital in Kutkai.

In the run-up to the 2022 Winter Olympics in Beijing, China began enforcing a stricter border in order to prevent the spread of COVID-19 from neighbouring nations. This led to a build up of trucks and products in Mong-Yu which were unable to enter into China, and many fresh fruit destined for the Chinese market were instead discarded.

=== Operation 1027 ===
In Operation 1027, the Three Brotherhood Alliance began clashing with the Tatmadaw over control of the area around Muse. The Tatmadaw's 105th tactical command base is located on a hill in Mong-Yu. Before attacking the Tatmadaw's base in Muse, the alliance attacked its base in Lone Khan, which fell on 26 November 2023. Attacks on Mong-Yu began on 27 November. The Ta’ang National Liberation Army (TNLA) dismissed claims it captured the command base on 14 December. Despite ceasefire talks between the alliance and the Tatmadaw being held in Yunnan province in China, the Brotherhood Alliance continued to attack Mong-Yu. Mong-Yu and the 105th mile trade zone were captured days after the ceasefire talks.
