= Mong Ko =

Mong Ko မုံးကိုးမြို့ 勐古 Monekoe, Man Guo, Man Kan
- Town
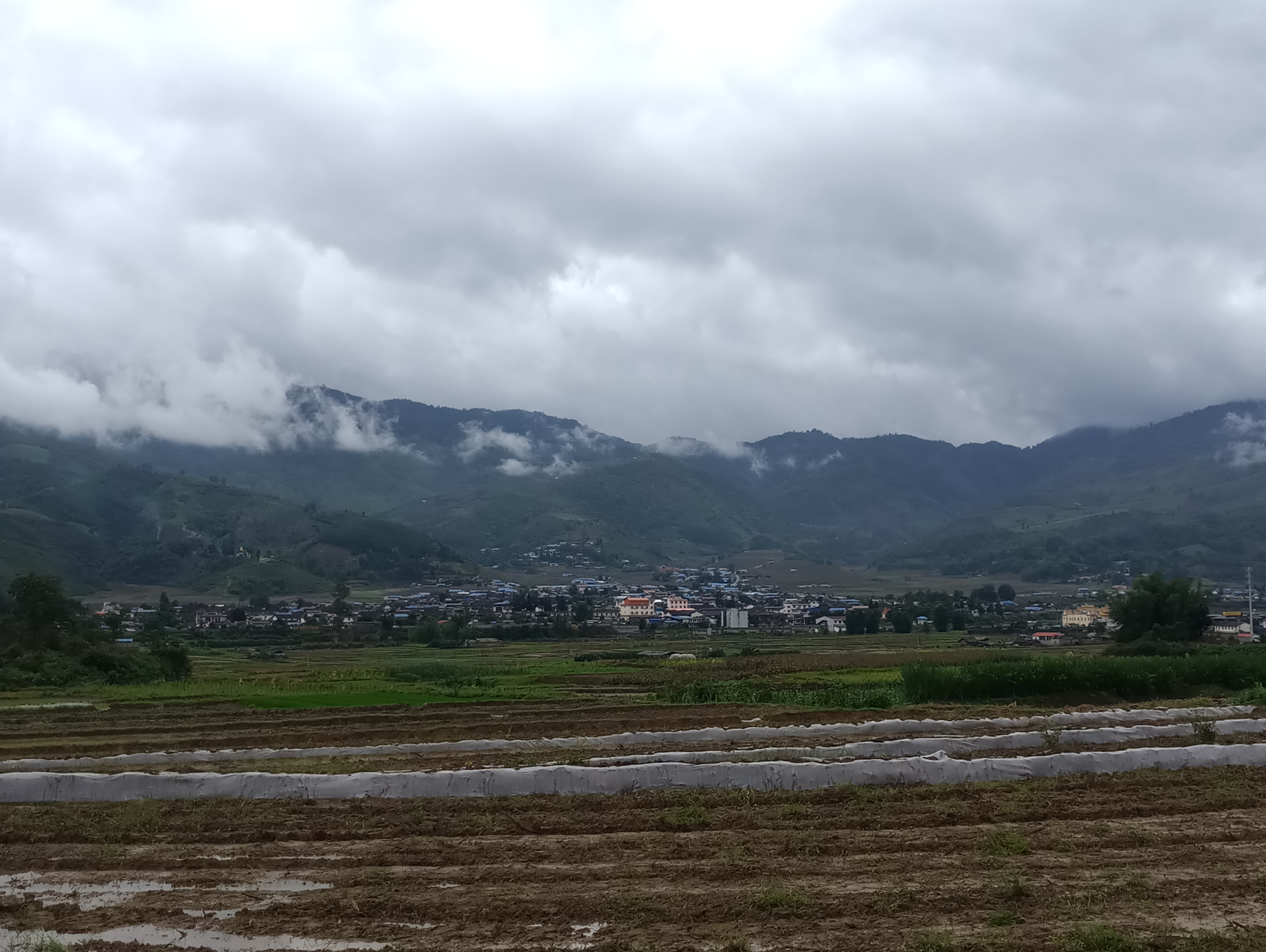
- Mong Ko, photographed in Manghai, China

- Location within Myanmar
- Coordinates: 24°6′1″N 98°18′50″E
- Country: Myanmar
- State: Shan
- District: Mu Se District
- Township: Mu Se Township
- Elevation: 1,480 ft (450 m)

Population (2014)
  - Town: 24,565
  - Urban: 8,847
  - Rural: 15,718
- Time zone: UTC+6:30 (MMT)

Mong Ko (Burmese: မုံးကိုးမြို့; Chinese: 勐古; pinyin: Měng gǔ), sometimes spelled Mongko or Monekoe and also known as Man Kan, Man Guo and Panglong, is a town in Mu Se Township, Mu Se District, northern Shan State, Myanmar.

Like many towns in the region, Mong Ko is known to be a hotspot for drug production and trade.

== Geography ==
Mong Ko lies by the China–Myanmar border, 25 km east of Pang Hseng (Kyu Koke). There is a border checkpoint in the town. The town on the Chinese part of the border is Manghai in Mangshi county-level city, Yunnan Province.

== History ==
The Communist Party of Burma (CPB) entered Shan State on New Year Day 1968, captured Mong Ko, and established the first war zone ‘303’ of the CPB North-East Command (NEC). This was quickly followed by ‘404’ in Kokang substate winning over the local warlord Pheung Kya-shin.

For 20 years Pheung controlled Kokang as a member of the Communist Party of Burma. In 1989, however, the CPB split up and Pheung established his own army, the Myanmar National Democratic Alliance Army, with which he mutinied and captured Mong Ko town. After this he signed a cease-fire with the military junta, which allowed the Kokang army to retain their weapons, and established an autonomous Kokang region as the "First Special Region" of Myanmar.

The Northern Alliance launched an offensive to capture Mong Ko on 20 November 2016. The town was recaptured by the Myanmar Army in December 2016.

On November 7 2023 the Brotherhood Alliance, which consists of most of the same members of the Northern Alliance, established control over the town, raising the Myanmar National Democratic Alliance Army (MNDAA) flag over the border bridge.
