= Pang Hseng =

Pang Hseng ပန်ဆိုင်းမြို့ Kyu Koke
- Town
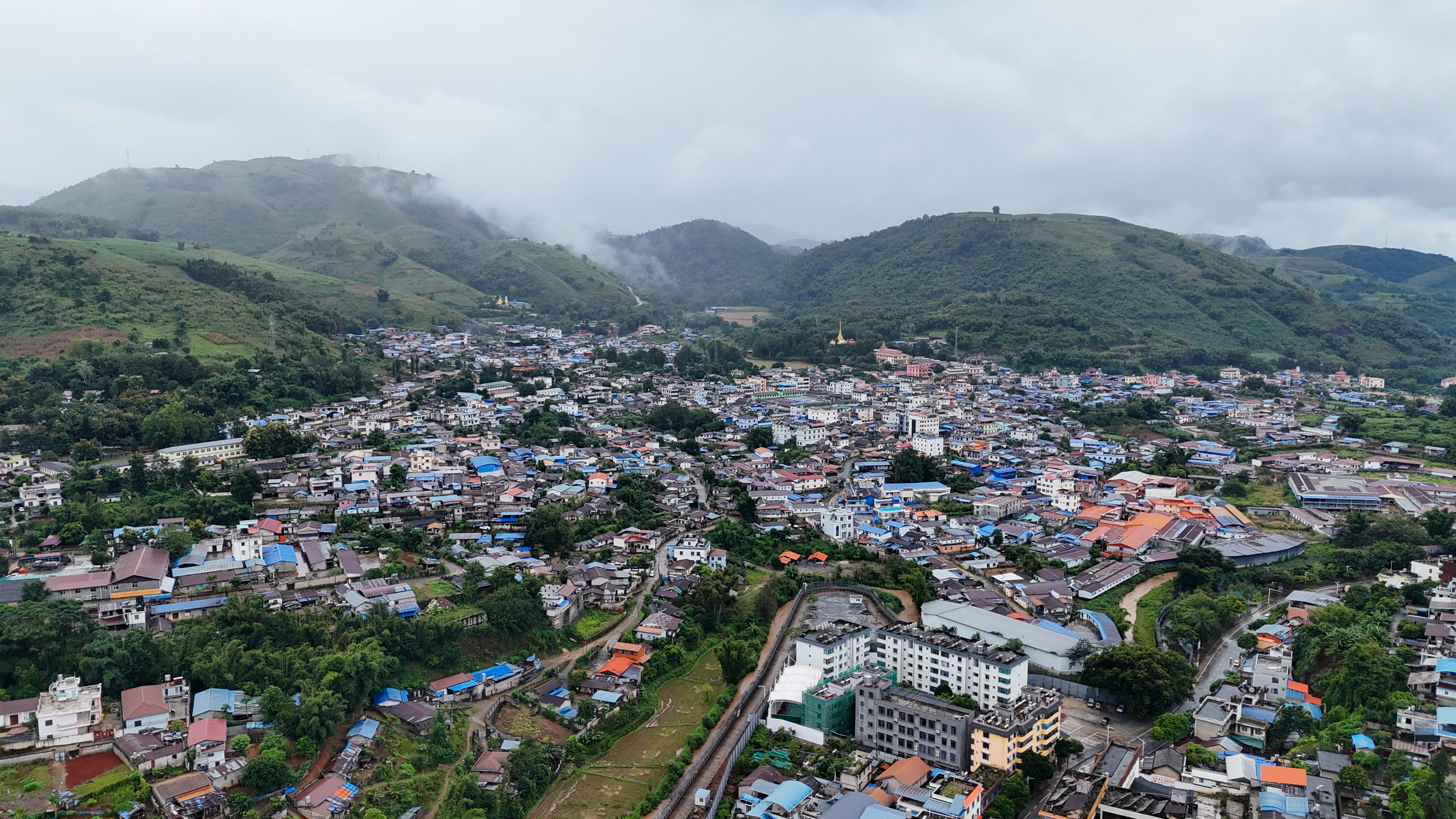
- Aerial view of Pang Hseng

- Location within Myanmar
- Coordinates: 24°04′32″N 98°03′44″E
- Country: Myanmar
- State: Shan
- District: Mu Se District
- Township: Mu Se Township
- Elevation: 2,785 ft (849 m)

Population (2014)
  - Town: 22,950
  - Urban: 9,530
  - Rural: 13,420
- Time zone: UTC+6:30 (MMT)

Pang Hseng, also known as Pan Saing, Kyu Koke and Kyu-hkök, is a town in Mu Se Township, Mu Se District, northern Shan State, Myanmar.

On 2 November 2023 it was reported that the town had come fully under control of the Brotherhood Alliance during the ongoing civil war.

== Geography ==
Pang Hseng lies 25 km west of Mong Ko (Monekoe) by the border with China, the nearest town being Wandingzhen (Wanting) to the north across the river. There is a border checkpoint in the town.
