= Namhkam, Shan State =

Namkham ဝဵင်းၼမ်ႉၶမ်း
- Town
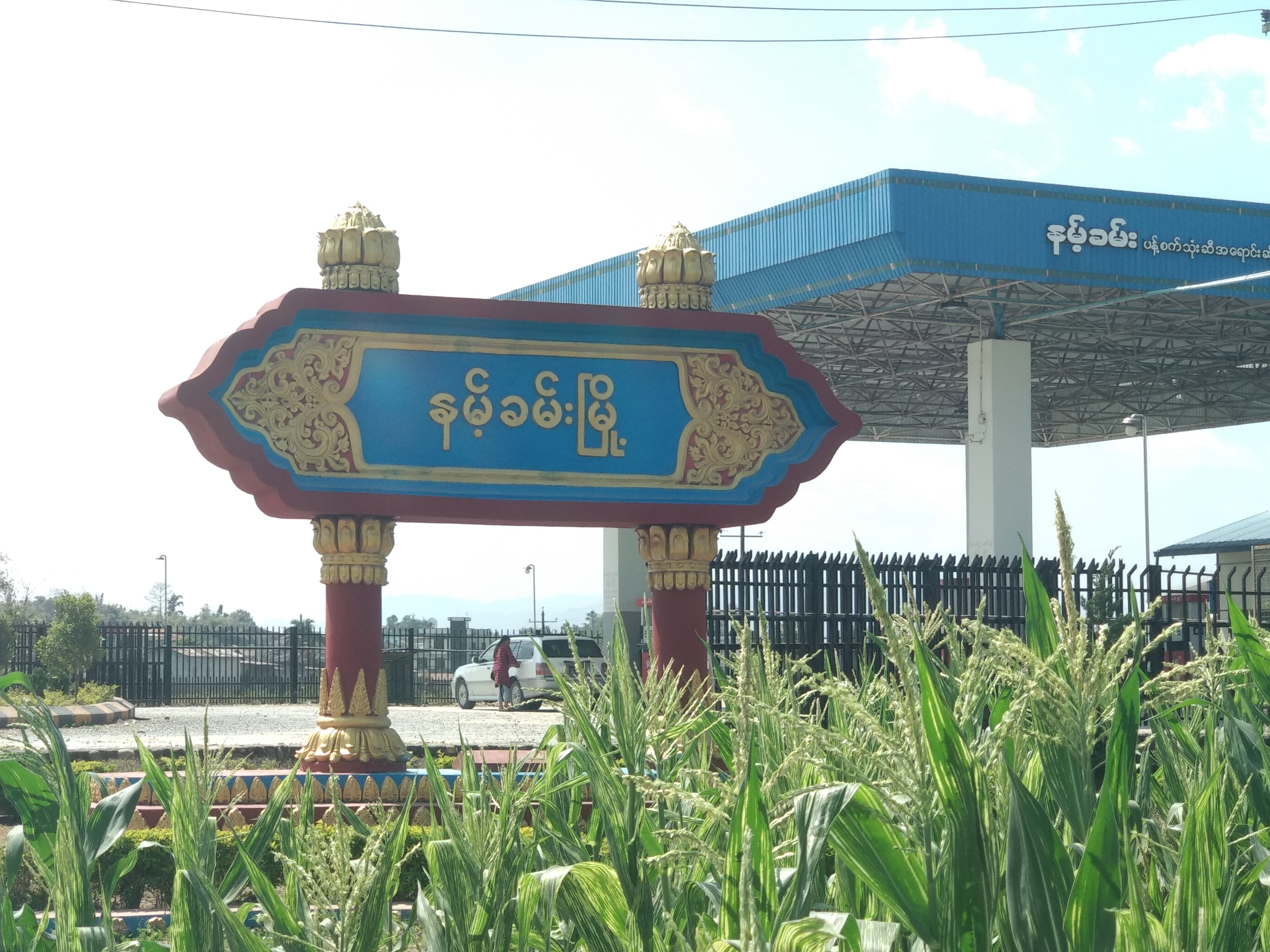

- Location in Myanmar (Burma)
- Coordinates: 23°50′00″N 97°41′00″E
- Country: Myanmar
- Division: Shan State
- District: Mu Se District
- Township: Namhkam Township

Area
  - Total: 4.52 sq mi (11.71 km^{2})
- Elevation: 2,489 ft (759 m)

Population (2019)
  - Total: 33,382
  - Density: 7,383/sq mi (2,851/km^{2})
  - Ethnicities: Shan
  - Religions: Buddhism
- Time zone: UTC+6.30 (MMT)

Namhkam (Burmese: နမ့်ခမ်းမြို့; Shan: ၼမ်ႉၶမ်း; Tai Nüa: ᥘᥛᥳ ᥑᥛᥰ), also spelled Nam Kham is the principal town of Namhkam Township in northern Shan State, Myanmar, situated on the southern bank of the Shweli River near the border with Yunnan Province, China.

== History ==
The region surrounding Namhkam originally belonged to China, but from 1894 to 1897, the British colonial administration in Burma built a road between this frontier town and Bhamo by the Ayeyarwady River in Kachin State for a distance of 56 miles (90 km). The road was intended to be used by Chinese muleteers for the benefit of border trade.

During the Second World War, the Allies built the Ledo Road, stretching from Ledo in Assam, India to Kunming, China, across northern Burma. By the end of 1944, the road stretched 439 miles (707 km) to Namhkam, linking up with the old Burma Road at Bhamo.

In 2005, the Shan State Army - South attempted to fill a power vacuum in Namhkam left by the 1989 ceasefire agreement between their counterparts in the north and the Burmese military, but their attempt was promptly thwarted.

The governments of Myanmar and China have been working to resolve a border dispute in the area of Namhkam and Muse since 2014.

On 6 November 2023, the Namkham police station was captured by Ta'ang National Liberation Army (TNLA) fighters, bringing the city under the limited control of the Brotherhood Alliance during the ongoing civil war. Anti-junta forces took full control of the town and surrounding township on 18 December 2023.

== Education ==
As of 2017, there are two high schools, three middle schools, 100 primary schools and one monastic school in Namhkam.

== Agriculture ==
Cultivation of the opium poppy in the area during British rule caused considerable deforestation, noted in 1920 east of a line from Lashio to Namhkam. A 2005 survey by the Shan State Peace Council recorded 1,800 drug addicts in Namhkam alone. Community-run rehabilitation centers were set up to tackle the rising problem of addiction. The first of these facilities were constructed in 1998, but were declared illegal and forced to close down in 2000 by authorities. Buddhist monks and teachers in Namhkam are also involved in the amelioration of the HIV/AIDS issue amongst drug users.

Hsinshweli high yield hybrid rice cultivation has been promoted in recent years by authorities in the region. The results were disastrous for Shan farmers and left many of them in destitute.

== Development ==
Myanmar and China signed a contract in August 2003 for the construction of the hydroelectric Shweli I Dam on the Shweli River near Namhkam, aiming to supply electricity to Kyaukme, Hsipaw, Lashio and Namtu. It was completed in 2009 and has a 600 MW installed capacity.

== Notable people ==
Burmese American Dr. Gordon Seagrave, famously known as the "Burma Surgeon", ran the American missionary hospital overlooking Namhkam. He was believed to have had military intelligence duties as well as medical ones, and he later wrote articles on his experience in Namhkam.

== Gallery ==
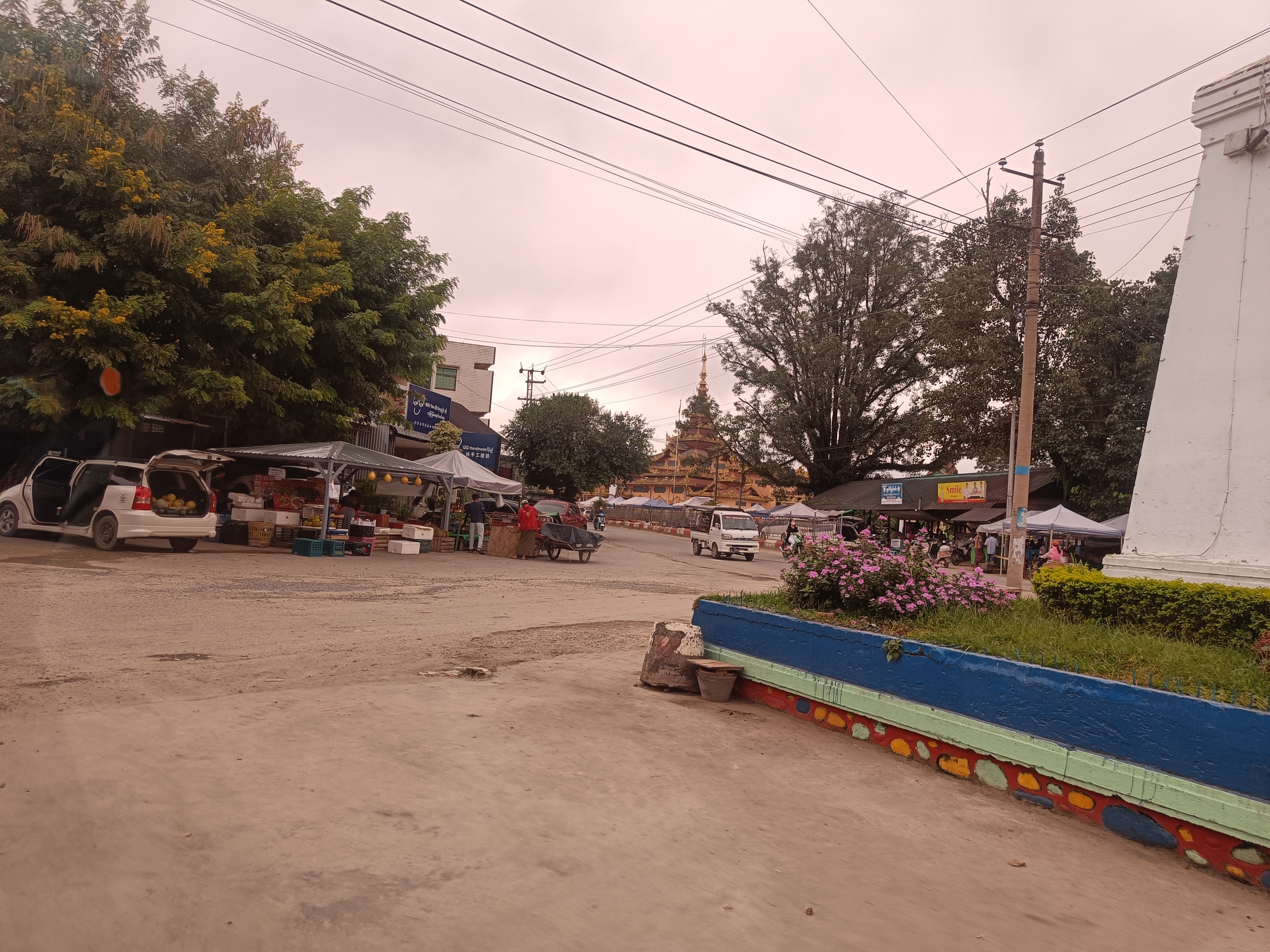
Buddhist Pagoda in Namhkan

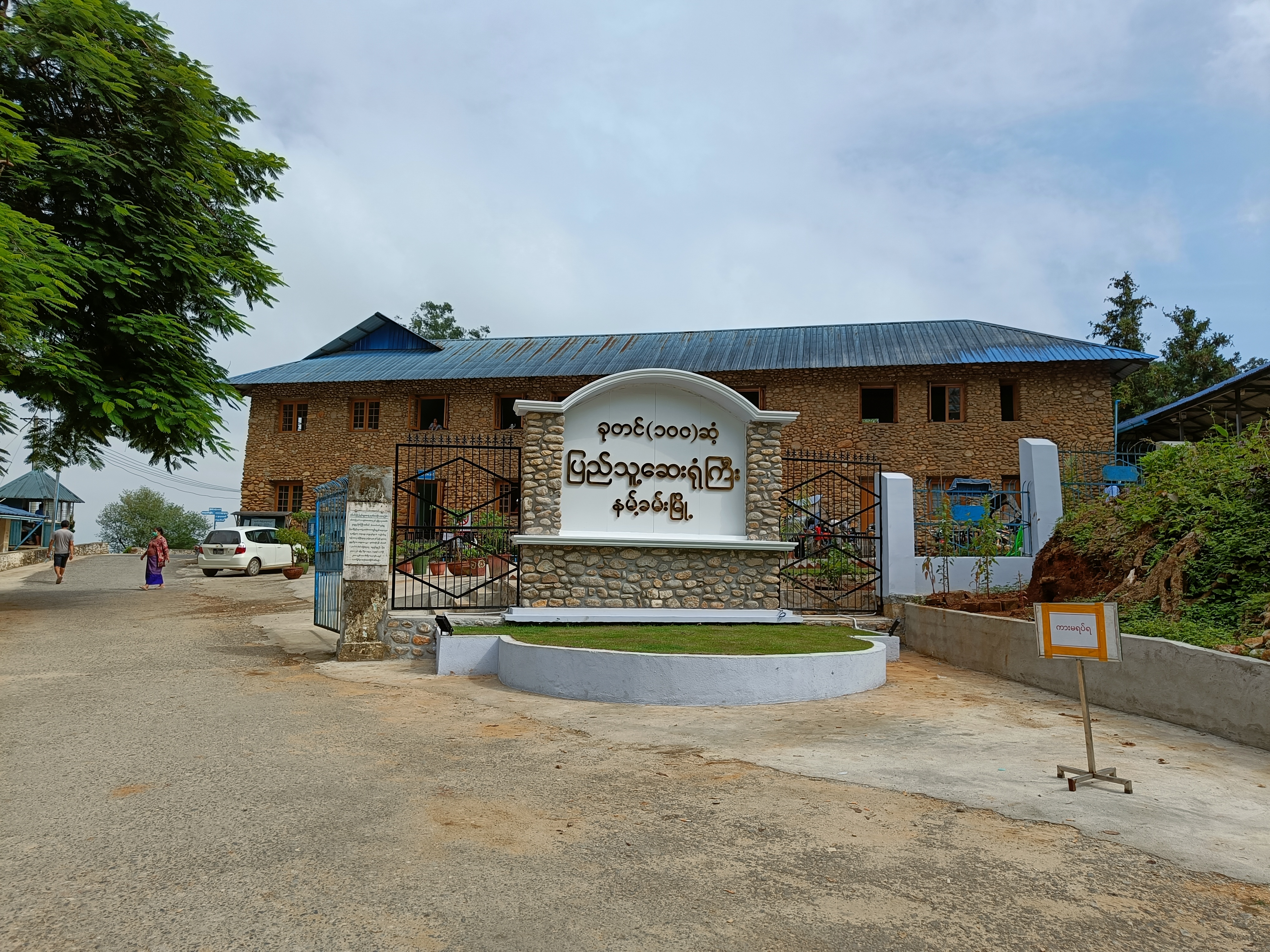
Hospital in Namhkan

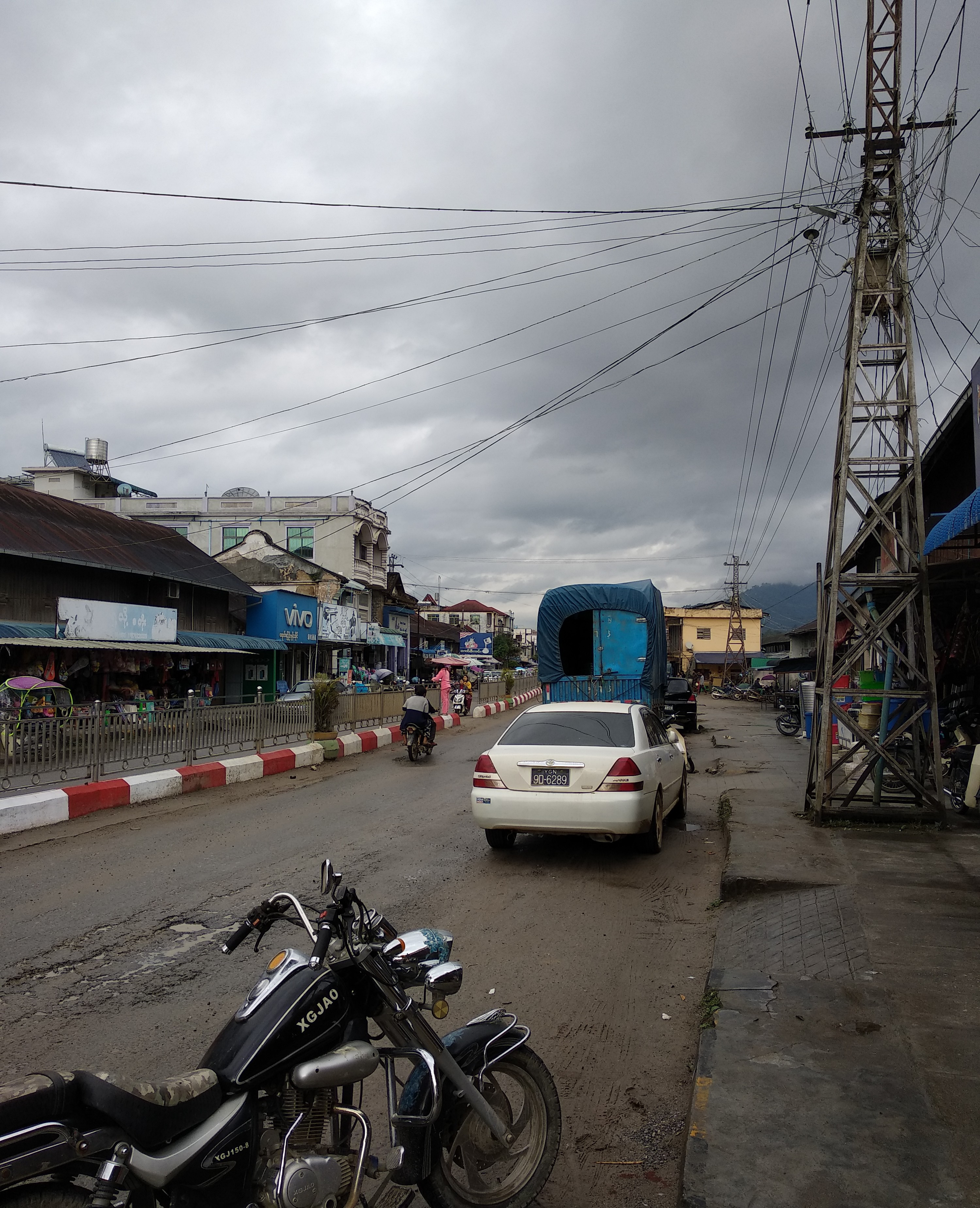
Road in Namhkan
