= Nyi Sein =

Burmese politician

Member of the Amyotha Hluttaw
- In office 1 February 2016 – 1 February 2021
- Constituency: Shan State No. 5

Personal details
- Born: 4 January 1964 (age 62) Namhkam, Shan State, Burma (Myanmar)
- Party: Ta'ang National Party
- Spouse: Nan Sein Nu
- Parent(s): Maut Saung (father); A Swam (mother)
- Education: Mandalay University B.A (History)

Nyi Sein (Burmese: ညစိန် , born 4 January 1964) is a Burmese politician who served as a House of Nationalities member of parliament for Shan State No. 5 constituency.

== Early life and education ==
He was born on 4 January 1964 in Namhkam, Shan State, Burma (Myanmar). He graduated with B.Sc from Mandalay University.

== Political career ==
He is a member of the Ta'ang National Party. In the Myanmar general election, 2015, he was elected as an Amyotha Hluttaw MP and elected representative from Shan State No. 5 parliamentary constituency. He also serves as a member of Amyotha Hluttaw Women and Children's Rights Committee.
