= Kachin Defense Army =

Burmese armed insurgent group

- ကချင်ကာကွယ်ရေးတပ်ဖွဲ့
- Leader: Mahtu Naw
- Dates active: 1990 – 2023
- Headquarters: Kawnghka, Shan State
- Active regions: Shan State
- Ideology: Kachin nationalism
- Size: 850 (+2,000 reservists)
- Wars: the Internal conflict in Myanmar

The Kachin Defense Army (Burmese: ကချင်ကာကွယ်ရေးတပ်ဖွဲ့; abbreviated KDA), also known as the Kaungkha militia, was an armed insurgent group that operated in northern Shan State, Myanmar. It was converted into a pro-Tatmadaw militia after it surrendered to the Burmese military in January 2010.

== History ==
The KDA was formerly the 4th brigade of the Kachin Independence Army (KIA), until it split from its parent organisation, the Kachin Independence Organisation (KIO), and moved their headquarters to Kawnghka, Kutkai Township, Shan State. After the Mong Tai Army disbanded, the KDA gained some of their abandoned territory. In 1991, the group signed a ceasefire with the Burmese government.

In 2010, the KDA accepted a proposal by the State Peace and Development Council, the then governing body of Myanmar, to transform into a militia for the Burmese military. Originally, the KDA requested to be converted into a Border Guard Force to accommodate a larger army size, but this was rejected. The KDA surrendered their heavy weapons and mortars to the Northeastern Regional Command, in accordance to the "conversion process". The group was also split into two smaller factions, with 100 members in each group.

In March 2020, the groups headquarters in Kawnghka was raided by the Myanmar Army. Several leaders were detained, around 1,000 weapons were confiscated, and stashes of illegal drugs were seized.

In December 2023, during Operation 1027, the militia surrendered to KIA forces after one of its bases were captured by the TNLA.

== See also ==
- Kachin Independence Organisation
- Kachin Independence Army
- New Democratic Army - Kachin
