= Muse, Myanmar =

Muse မူဆယ်မြို့ (ဝဵင်းမူႇၸေႈ)
- Town
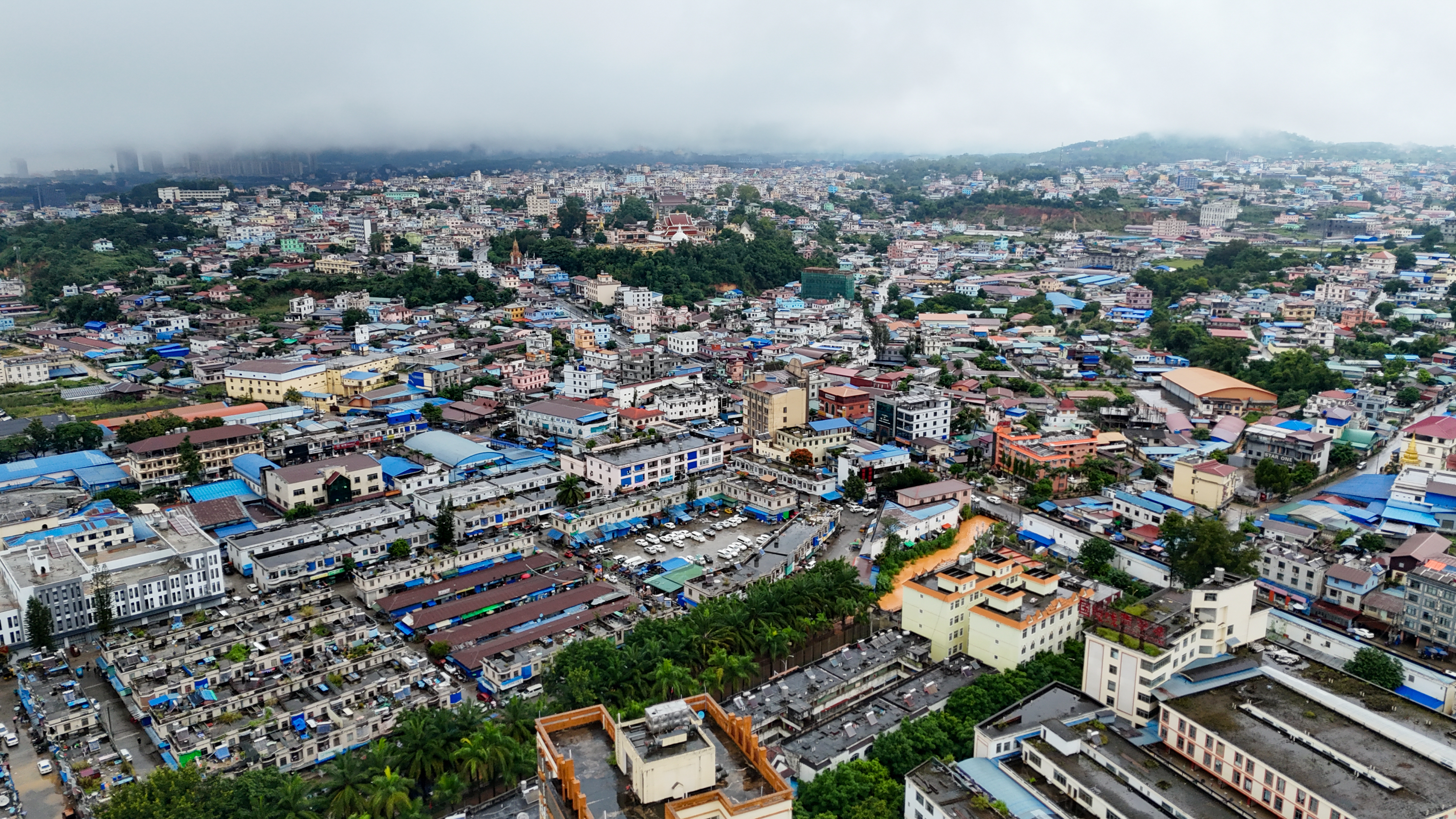
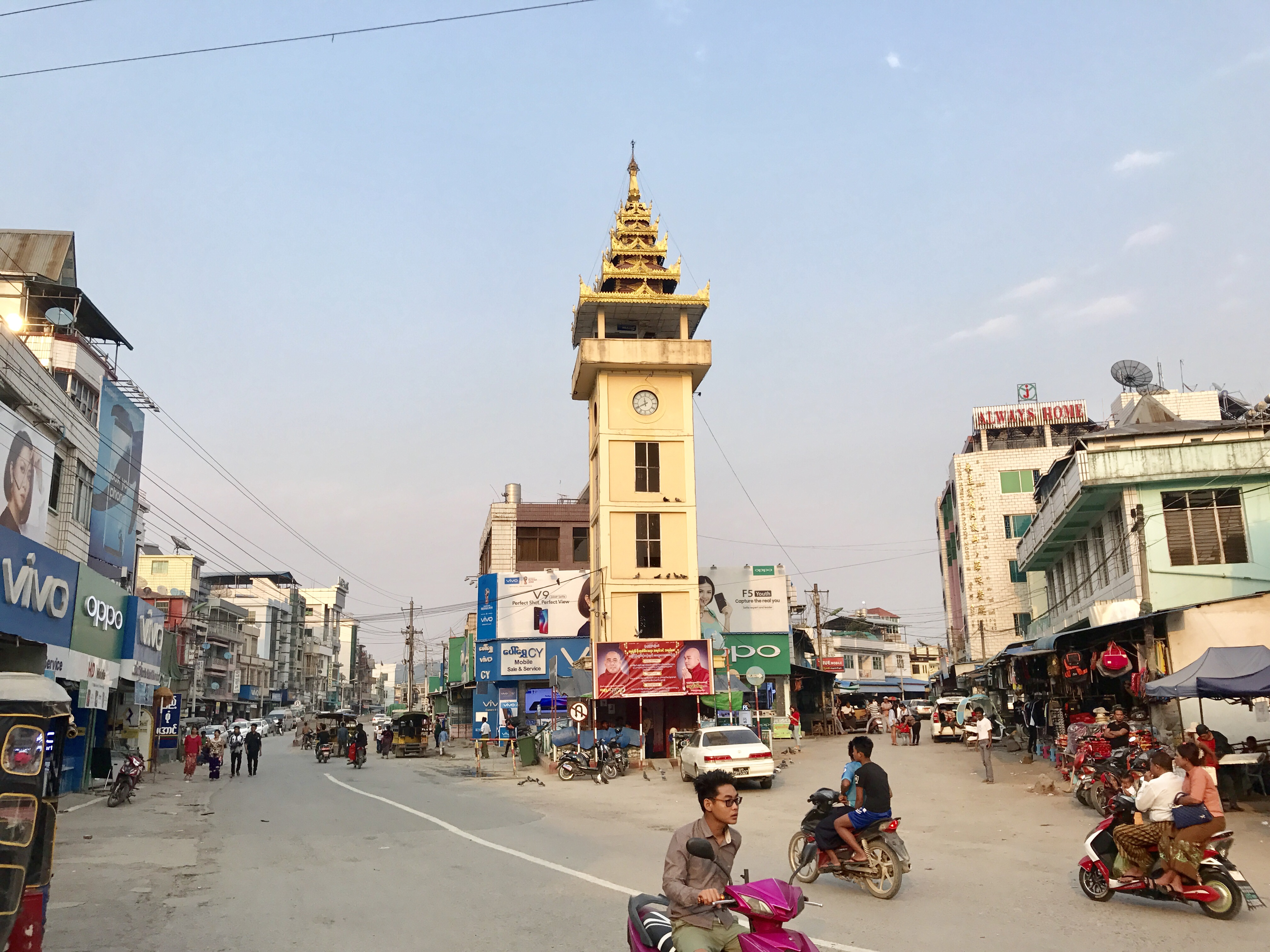
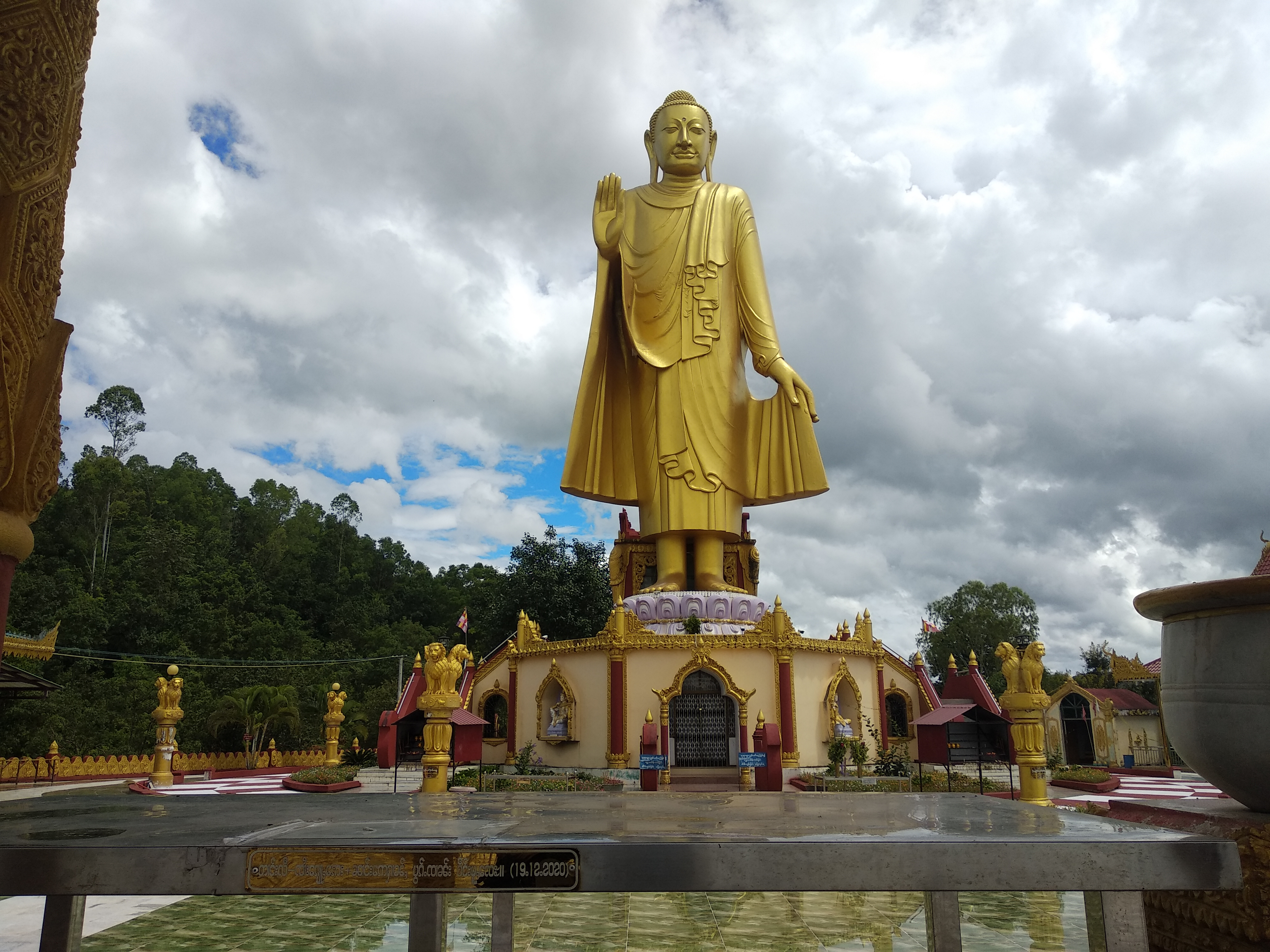
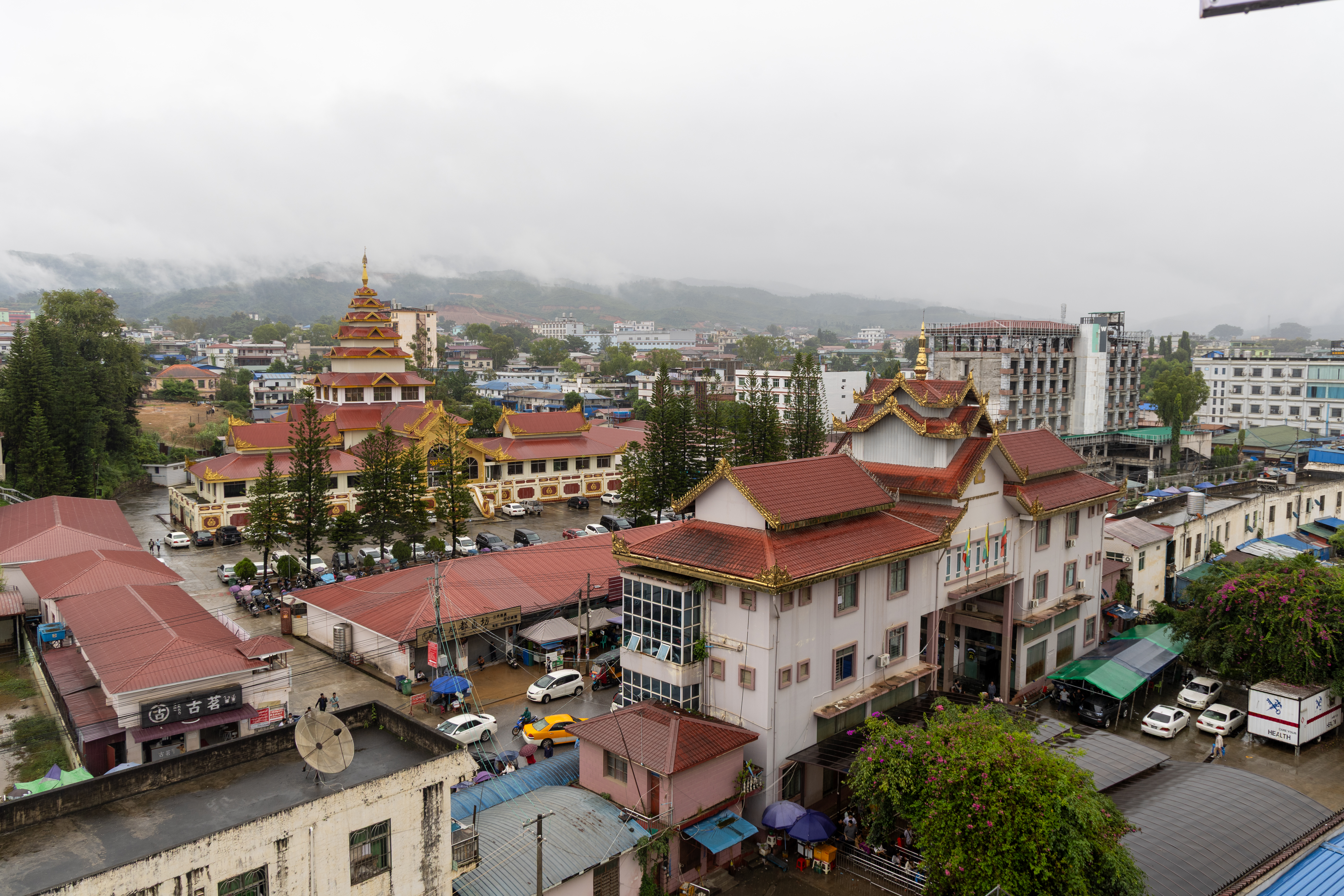
- Muse Skyline Clock tower Pagoda Port of entry

- Location in Myanmar (Burma)
- Coordinates: 23°58′45″N 97°54′17″E
- Country: Myanmar
- State: Shan State
- District: Mu Se District
- Township: Mu Se Township

Population (2014)
  - Total: 165,022
  - Religions: Buddhism Islam Christianity
- Time zone: UTC+6.30 (MMT)

Muse (Burmese: မူဆယ်မြို့, MLCTS: mu hcai mrui.; Shan: မူႇၸေႊ; Chinese: 木姐) is the capital of Mu Se District and the principal town of Mu Se Township in northern Shan State, Myanmar (Burma). It is a border town situated on the Shweli River (Nam Mao), and is connected by a bridge to Ruili (Shweli, [ʃwèlì], in Burmese) in Yunnan Province, China. The town is a major regional trade hub with China, accounting for 70% of cross-border trade between the two nations.

== History ==
The old bridge in Muse, dubbed the "Gun Bridge" by locals in reference to the frequency of illegal armaments trafficking through the bridge, was closed in 2005, replaced by a wider bridge parallel to it.

In 2014, the governments of Myanmar and China have been discussing a border dispute in the area of Namkham and Muse.

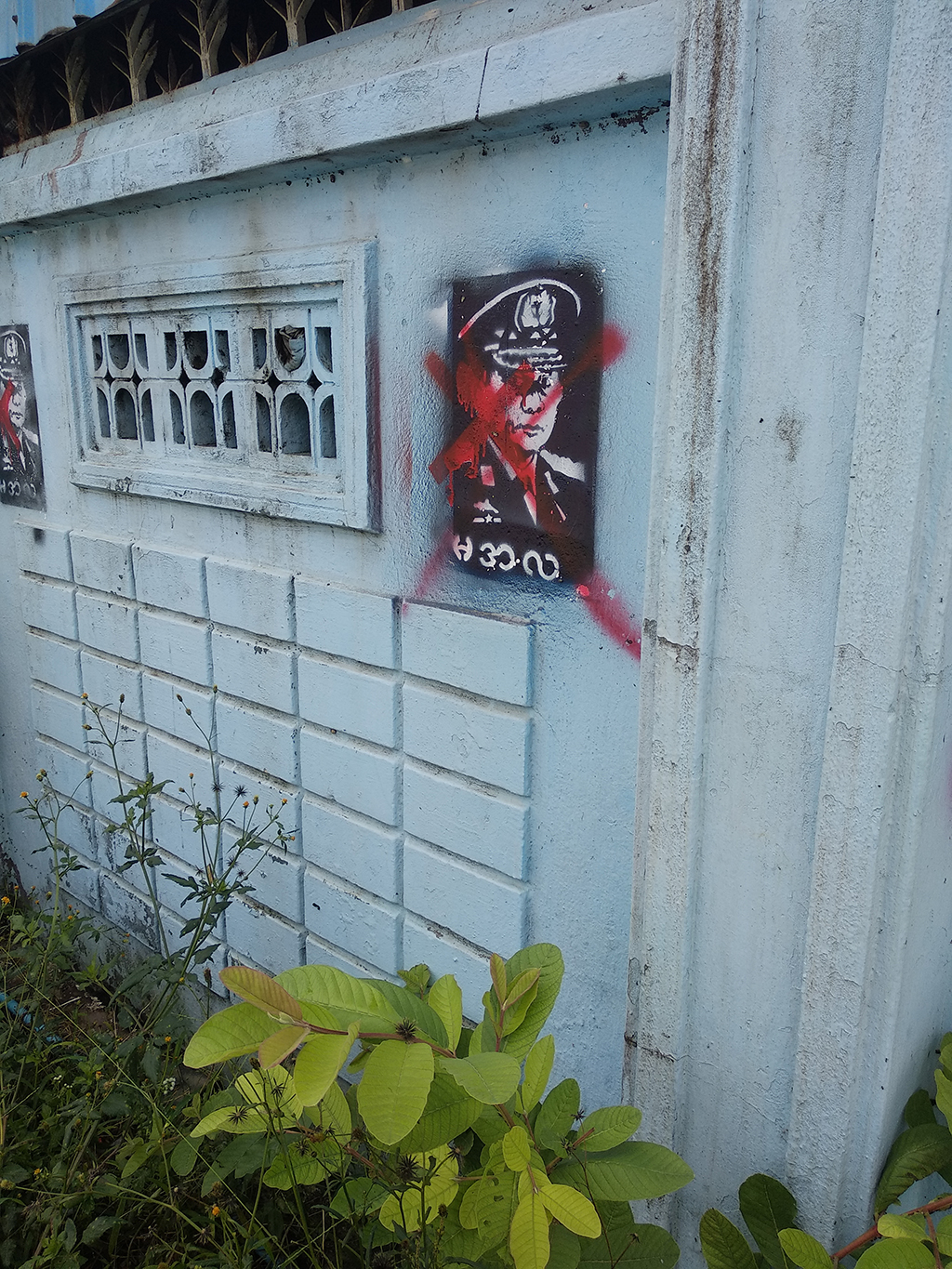
Anti-junta posters in 2021

On May 23, 2021, the People's Defense Force, the armed forces of the National Unity Government, clashed with Tatmadaw forces in Muse, killing 13 security guards.

During Operation 1027, the Three Brotherhood Alliance began clashing with the Tatmadaw over control of Muse. The main resistance from the Tatmadaw is located at its 105th tactical command base, located on a hill east of Muse in Mong-Yu. However, the city proper remains under full Tadmadaw control.

== Transport ==
Muse is today connected to Mandalay via Lashio by the National Highway 3 450 km Asian Highway route 14 (AH14), The old Burma Road links the new road to Bhamo in Kachin State which links to the Ledo Road. Mandalay-Lashio-Muse Road included part of the Burma Road and was rebuilt and upgraded for heavy traffic in 1998 on a Build-Operate-Transfer basis (BOT) by the Asia World Company headed by the son of the former opium warlord Lo Hsing Han. It has cut the journey time from 2 days, even a week in the rainy season, to just 12–16 hours. Muse is also connected to central Burma via the Mandalay–Lashio Railway.

== Economy ==
Muse is home to one of 5 official border trade posts with China, and opened on 21 January 1998. In 2022, the trade volume at the border post stood at US$2.099 billion. Cross-border trade was banned by Ne Win after the military came to power in Burma in 1962 but the ban was lifted following negotiations in 1988. Bilateral trade has risen steadily since, increasing by 60% in the fiscal year ending 31 March 2008, and constitutes 24% of Burma's trade ranking China as a major trading partner second only to Thailand.

Burma exports mainly raw materials such as agricultural produce, fish, timber, gems and minerals, and imports consumer goods, electronics, machinery and processed food. Muse's '105th mile Trade Zone', a border zone of 150 hectares, opened in April 2006, the first and largest border trade camp of its kind in Burma, handling as much as 70% of cross border trade with China. A trade fair has been held annually every December since 2001 alternating between the two border towns each year with India, Bangladesh and Thailand as well as China taking part.

In 2007 the local militia, under orders of the military authorities, seized 10,000 acres (40 km^{2}) of land in the area, mainly tea and orange plantations as well as small farms, with little or no compensation, in a drive to cultivate physic nuts for biodiesel as an alternative fuel.

On 8 May 2008, the military seized 20 truckloads of biscuits and other goods at Muse allegedly for the relief of Cyclone Nargis victims.

A joint enterprise between Burma and China to construct oil and gas pipelines from the Bay of Bengal via Mandalay through Muse to Kunming in Yunnan Province starts operations in 2009.

== Narcotics ==
Recently China built a 4 km (2.5 mi) long fence on the border near Ruili in order to stop drug trafficking and two more are under construction. Drug addiction is a major problem in the area. The opium poppy harvest had increased since Lo Hsing Han managed to rebuild his drug empire after becoming the intermediary for cease-fire agreements between the military intelligence chief Khin Nyunt and the Kokang and Wa insurgents who had rebelled against and toppled the Communist leadership in 1989. The World Food Programme carried out emergency food assistance to former poppy farmers in 2004-2005 as pressure mounted to stop cultivation of the poppy.

Gambling, drugs and prostitution flourished in Ruili, but Muse's own efforts to share in the Las Vegas style business atmosphere met with much less success. The Chinese authorities cracked down on heroin entering - but not the chemical ingredients for the amphetamine-type stimulant (ATS) called yaba leaving - and also on Chinese men enjoying the same pleasures on the Burmese side of the border. Besides the UNODC, a number of groups and organisations such as the Asian Harm Reduction Network (AHRN) and Buddhist monks are also involved in the amelioration of the HIV/AIDS problem among drug users.
