= Namhkam Township =

Township in Shan State, Myanmar

Namhkam Township နမ့်ခမ်းမြို့နယ်
- Township
- Nan Khan Township
- Location of Nankhan in Muse district
- Coordinates: 23°50′0″N 97°40′0″E
- Country: Burma
- State: Shan State
- District: Mu Se District

Area
  - Total: 466.85 sq mi (1,209.14 km^{2})
- Elevation: 2,489 ft (759 m)
- Highest elevation: 7,741 ft (2,359 m)

Population (2019)
  - Total: 116,744
  - Density: 250.067/sq mi (96.5513/km^{2})
  - Ethnicities: Shan; Palaung; Lisu
  - Religions: Buddhism
- Time zone: UTC+6:30 (MMT)

Namhkam Township (also known as Nanhkan Township (Burmese: နမ့်ခမ်းမြို့နယ်)) is a township of Mu Se District in the Shan State of eastern Myanmar. The principal town is Namhkam, a few miles away from Mu Se.

== Inhabitants ==
A large majority of the people in Namhkam Township are Shan and Kachin with a smaller presence of the Palaung.

== Economy ==
According to a survey conducted in 16 villages, poppy cultivation increased from 812 acres (328 hectares) to 1,535 acres (617 hectares) from the 2006–2007 season to the 2008–2009 season.

== Unrest ==
The Shan State Army-North (SSA-N) and Shan State National Army (SSNA) are active in Namhkam Township. Pansay Militia is one of eight influential militias. Kyaw Myint, head of Pansay militia, was selected as a USDP candidate of Namhkam for Shan State Hluttaw.

== See also ==
- 2026 Namhkam Township explosion
