= Nawnghoi =

- Location within Myanmar

Highest point
- Elevation: 1,936 m (6,352 ft)
- Listing: List of mountains in Burma
- Coordinates: 23°53′15″N 98°23′24″E

Geography
- Location: Shan State, Myanmar
- Parent range: Shan Hills

Climbing
- First ascent: unknown
- Easiest route: climb

Nawnghoi is a mountain of the Shan Hills. It is located in Shan State, Burma, 122 km to the ENE of Longkam.

== Geography ==
Nawnghoi is a mountain with a massive rocky summit that rises to a height of 1,936 m (6,352 ft). The nearest villages are Panglong, about 2 km to the west, and Song Möng Sihsu located on the eastern side at the foot of the mountain. The Salween river flows southwards 2 km to the east.

== See also ==
- List of mountains in Burma
