= 2011 Yangon explosion =

Warehouse explosion in Yangon, Myanmar

Coordinates: 16°47′52″N 96°11′16″E

2011 Rangoon explosion
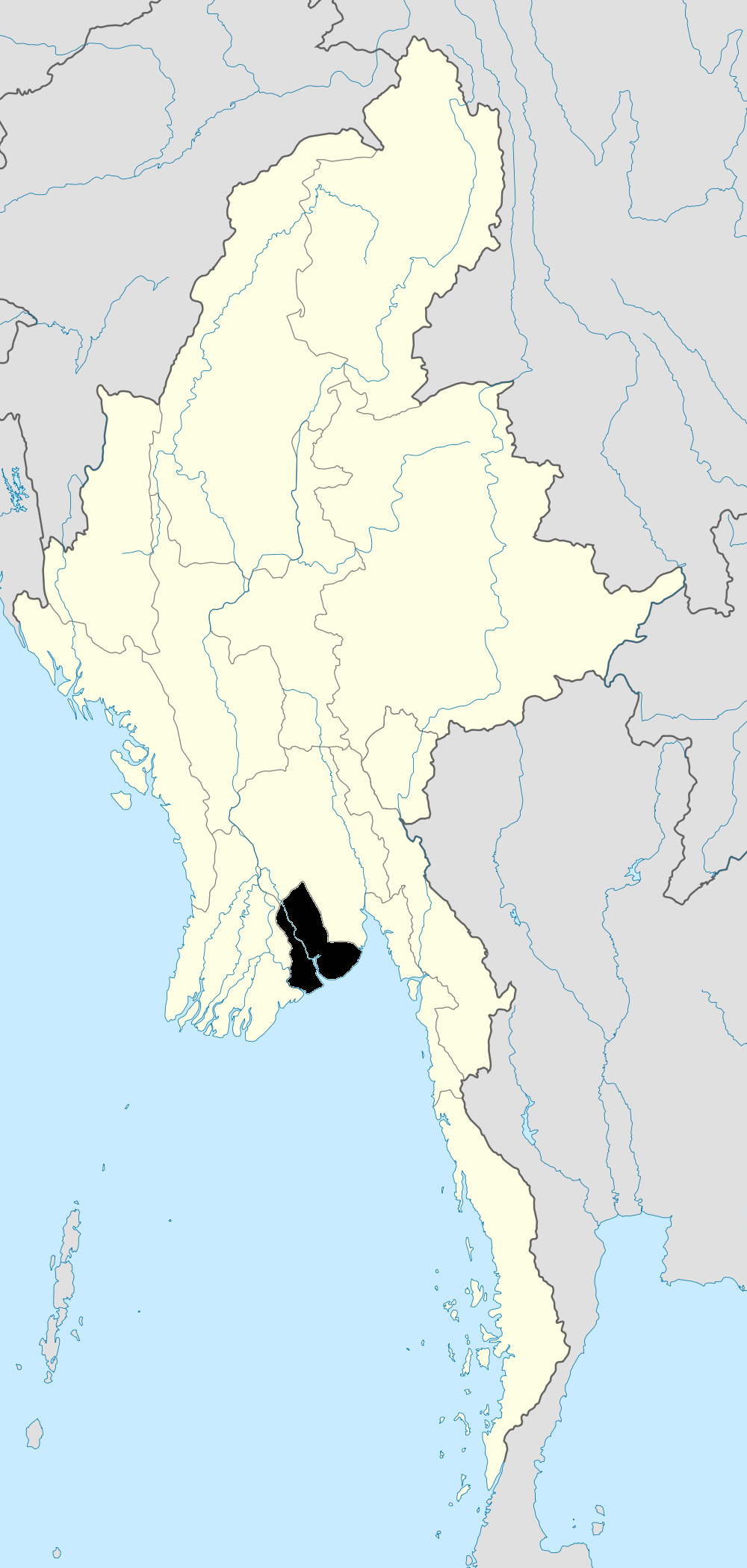
- Location of Yangon Region in Burma
- Location: Mingala Taungnyunt, Yangon, Burma
- Date: 29 December 2011
- Deaths: 17
- Injuries: 83

On December 29, 2011, police in Myanmar reported a fire followed by several explosions killing at least 17 people and injuring 83 in Mingalar Taung Nyunt Township, Yangon. The dead included five firefighters who were caught in an explosion during the blaze.

== Explosion ==
The blasts occurred as firefighters were putting out the blaze that had started in a state-owned warehouse before spreading to other buildings and nearby homes before dawn. The earthshaking explosion hit and destroyed over 100 houses, 26 warehouses and two monasteries as well as four fire engines. The explosions rocked the entire city, jolting residents from sleep. A 40 feet (12 m) wide and 15 feet (4.6 m) deep crater was visible at the site.

The two owners leased the warehouses from the state to store electronic goods, chemicals, and herbal materials, which were later believed to be the cause of the fire and explosion.

== Casualities ==
CNN reported the casualties as 20 people, citing state-own television, Myanmar Radio and Television.
