= Mu Se Township =

Muse Township မူဆယ်မြို့နယ်
- Township
- Location in Muse district
- Coordinates: 23°58′0″N 97°54′0″E
- Country: Myanmar
- State: Shan State
- District: Mu Se District
- Elevation: 2,598 ft (792 m)
- Time zone: UTC+6:30 (MMT)

Mu Se Township (Burmese: မူဆယ်မြို့နယ်, MLCTS: mu hcai mrui. nai; Shan: ၸႄႈဝဵင်းမူႇၸေႈ) is a township of Mu Se District in northern Shan State of eastern Myanmar. The principal town and administrative center is Muse. It is the terminus of Mandalay-Lashio-Muse road.

== Geography ==
Muse is the biggest border trading point between Myanmar and China. It is the home of the Muse (105 Miles) Trading Zone. The trading zone, spread over 370 acres, is 6 miles from Muse. It was opened in April 2006. Ruili is the Chinese town across the border from Muse. Pang Hseng (Kyu Koke) and Mong Ko (Monekoe) are other important towns in the area.

The township has two subtownships, unofficial subdivisions used for administrative and statistical purposes- Pang Hseng Subtownship and Mong Ko Subtownship.

== See also ==
- Muse, Myanmar
