= Mu Se District =

Muse District မူဆယ်ခရိုင်
- District
- Location in Shan State
- Coordinates: 23°58′00″N 97°54′00″E
- Country: Myanmar
- State: Shan State
- Elevation: 791 m (2,595 ft)
- Time zone: UTC+6.30 (MMT)

Mu Se District (Burmese: မူဆယ်ခရိုင်) is a district of northern Shan State in Myanmar. The district contains two townships. The capital is at Muse.

In 2022, the Ministry of Home Affairs promoted Kutkai Township from Muse District to its own district- the new Kutkai District. Prior to this, the district consisted of 4 towns and 1162 villages.

== Townships ==
Townships of Muse district Muse Nanhkan

The district contains the following townships and subtownships:

- Mu Se Township
  - Mong Ko Subtownship
  - Pang Hseng Subtownship (Kyukok Subtownship)
- Nanhkan Township
  - Man Hio Subtownship (Manhero)
