= 1020 incident =

2023 murder in Myanmar

- Native name: ၁၀၂၀ ဖြစ်စဉ်; “10·20”枪击案
- Location: Wohu Villa, Kokang, Myanmar
- Date: October 20, 2023
- Attack type: Mass shootings, massacres, kidnappings
- Deaths: 4
- Injuries: 4
- Perpetrator: Ming family

The 1020 incident (Burmese: ၁၀၂၀ ဖြစ်စဉ်), officially referred to by the Chinese government as the "10·20" shooting incident (Chinese: “10·20”枪击案), is an incident that occurred on 20 October 2023, in the Kokang Self-Administered Zone of Myanmar, in which a Chinese citizen suspected of being involved in telecom fraud was killed.

Multiple media reports on the details of the incident differed. The general situation was that hundreds of Chinese citizens were trapped in the Wohushanzhuang Telecom Fraud Park controlled by the Ming Xuechang family and engaged in telecom fraud. Under pressure from China's anti-telecom fraud campaign, the militia under the Ming family transferred Chinese telecom fraud personnel to other places. During the transfer, some people tried to escape. Chinese undercover police officers who were assisting the Chinese citizens revealed their identities and tried to stop the Ming family militia from transferring, but were killed instead. Several Chinese citizens died in the incident.

Myanmar's independent media Myanmar Now quoted sources from the Myanmar state media's military government to confirm the incident. The incident was officially confirmed by China on 30 December 2024. However, the casualties were different from those previously reported by the media, and it was denied that any Chinese police officers were killed or injured. Many media outlets regarded it as the fuse of the Operation 1027.

== Background ==
The Kokang Self-Administered Zone is part of Shan State in Myanmar and was controlled by the Myanmar National Democratic Alliance Army (MNDAA) before the 2009 Kokang incident. The MNDAA is an ethnic armed organization established by Pheung Kya-shin in 1989. After Pheung withdrew from the peace talks between the Communist Party of Burma and the military government, he and his subordinates established the MNDAA and implemented autonomy in Kokang. In 2009, the MNDAA experienced internal strife, and Pheung was betrayed by some of his subordinates. They cooperated with the Tatmadaw to drive the MNDAA out of the Kokang region. They were known as the Four Families of Kokang, namely Bai Suocheng, Wei Chaoren, Liu Guoxi and Liu Zhengxiang (Liu Abao). The Ming Xuechang family rose to prominence afterward, becoming a rising star outside the Four Families, and had close ties with the Four Families. With the support of the military junta, the Four Families and the Ming Xuechang family controlled the politics, economy and military of the Kokang region and engaged in various illegal activities such as drug trafficking, smuggling, gambling and telecommunications fraud.

Telecom fraud is one of the main sources of income for the four major families, from which they make huge profits, and it is also the main source of their conflict with China. These fraud groups are mainly composed of Chinese nationals who use various means, such as telephone, internet or social media, to defraud victims in China of their money. These fraudsters are usually recruited by the four major families with high salaries or other inducements, but once they arrive in the Kokang region, they are deprived of their freedom and forced to work under strict surveillance, and cannot leave or contact the outside world at will. Once they are found to have the intention to escape or resist, they will be severely punished, or even killed.

The United States Institute of Peace reported that the Chinese authorities "deliberately stood by" on the issue of telecom fraud. However, starting in the summer of 2023, the Chinese authorities allowed Chinese films on the subject of telecom fraud in northern Myanmar, including No More Bets, Tainted Love and Lost in the Stars, to be released, and the films grossed more than $1 billion. These films conveyed the message that "Chinese citizens can only be safe in Southeast Asia with China’s help". By mid-September 2023, China took unilateral action to exert unprecedented pressure on Shan State and Wa State.

== The incident ==
In October 2023, the Ming family began to plan the transfer of telecom fraudsters from Wohushan Villa. On 19 October, the Ming family notified the telecom fraud master of Wohushan Villa that the den would be raided on 20 October. To evade the crackdown, the Ming family and the telecom fraud master began to escort about 600 telecom fraudsters by armed force on the evening of the same day, transferring them from Wohushan Villa to "Chengde Mansion" (Red House) and "Donghu Villa" controlled by Ming Zhenzhen. On 20 October, during the transfer, some of the detainees realized that there was no hope of returning to China and tried to escape. They were helped by Chinese undercover police officers. When they escaped, they were discovered by the Ming family's armed forces. Even after the Chinese undercover police officers revealed their identities, the Ming family still ordered them to open fire (the Xinhua News Agency version did not mention the undercover police). Afterwards, Ming Zhenzhen instructed that the body be buried, "in a piece of land belonging to our family, because my father used to raise a lot of cattle and horses there, it was a very large piece of land, which was quite suitable".

Different media outlets reported varying death figures, with reports of 1 to 4 Chinese undercover police officers being killed and approximately 70 to 80 Chinese citizens being silenced. However, on 30 December 2024, the Wenzhou police, who were in charge of investigating the case, stated that the incident resulted in 4 deaths and 4 injuries, all of whom were staff members of the telecom fraud park.

This incident is known as the "1020 Incident" and is also considered the trigger for Operation 1027. The U.S. Institute of Peace stated in its report that the massacre of Chinese people and Chinese undercover police officers on 20 October was comparable in severity to the Mekong River massacre in 2011, and that "this incident undoubtedly angered China". The Burmese media outlet Myanmar Now reported, citing sources from the Burmese military government, that Chinese undercover police officers and other Chinese citizens were killed in the incident.

== Reactions ==
=== China ===
Some non-Chinese media reported that the 1020 incident has angered China. The United States Institute of Peace, BBC News, Myanmar Now, and Sing Tao Daily all reported that on 21 October 2023, the Foreign Affairs Office of the People's Government of Lincang City, Yunnan Province, China, sent a letter to Kokang, stating that China was highly concerned about the matter and demanding that Ming Xuechang explain the truth. However, a reporter from the Metropolitan Express of Zhejiang verified that the Foreign Affairs Office of the People's Government of Lincang City, responded to the matter by stating that it did not have the contact person listed in the letter circulating online, nor had it issued such a letter. According to a BBC News report, after the 1020 incident, China put strong pressure on the Myanmar military junta and Bai Suocheng, one of the Kokang rulers, demanding an explanation. A report by the U.S. Institute of Peace indicated that the Operation 1027, launched on 27 October under the pretext of "anti-telecom fraud," was tacitly approved by the Chinese side. From 3 to 5 November Nong Rong, Assistant Minister of Foreign Affairs of China, visited Myanmar and received a promise from the Myanmar military government to cooperate with China in combating telecom fraud and online gambling. On 12 November, the Zhejiang Provincial Public Security Bureau of China issued a public arrest warrant for four members of the Ming family: Ming Xuechang, Ming Guoping, Ming Julan, and Ming Zhenzhen. According to a report in Myanmar Now, China initially tried to resolve the issue secretly, but in the end, it issued a public arrest warrant for the Ming family.

On 10 December, the public security authorities of Liaoning, Fujian and Chongqing issued public arrest warrants for 10 high-ranking political and business figures in the Kokang region, including Bai Suocheng, Wei Huairen, and Liu Zhengxiang. On 30 December 2024, Xinhua News Agency published "The Crimes Are Too Numb to Be Counted, the Criminals Are Hunted Down and Returned Home - The Public Security Organs Solved the Case of the Ming Family in Kokang, Northern Myanmar". This was the first time that the Chinese government publicly confirmed the occurrence of the 1020 incident. However, the report denied the claim that the undercover police officer was killed, did not mention the involvement of police personnel, and the number of casualties in the report was different from the previous reports of other media. The Chinese side stated that on 19 October 2023, the Ming family notified the person in charge of the telecom fraud in Wohushan Village that the place would be investigated on 20 October. The Ming family then arranged for armed personnel to escort the telecom fraud personnel from Wohushan Village to other places for detention. The next day, some telecom fraud personnel escaped on the way. The armed personnel then shot at the escaped personnel, resulting in the deaths of 4 telecom fraud personnel and injuries to 4 others. Wang Zao, the executive deputy director of the Wenzhou Public Security Bureau, said in an interview with China Central Television (CCTV) that the claim that Chinese police personnel were killed in the "10·20" case was a complete rumor.

On 10 January 2026, according to a special program on the Chinese People's Police Day on CCTV, Chinese police led a team to northern Myanmar and found the bodies of three Chinese citizens in an abandoned breeding farm in Wolong Mountain Villa. They coordinated with the Myanmar side and quickly extracted biological samples. At the same time, they split into two groups: one escorted the evidence back to China, and the other guarded the bodies to ensure they were not damaged. After the evidence was transported back to China, the Chinese police also entered the core site of the telecom fraud park to investigate and collect evidence to solve the case. This also led to the complete annihilation of the four major families in northern Myanmar.

=== Myanmar ===
Independent media outlet Myanmar Now, cited sources from the Myanmar state media’s military government to confirm the occurrence of the 1020 incident. Following the 1020 incident, under the anger and strong pressure from China, current and former leaders of Kokang, including Ming Xuechang, Zhao Deqiang, and Liu Zhengxiang, held a special working meeting on October 26, stating that they would strengthen the crackdown on telecom fraud and its derivative crimes.

On 27 October, the Three Brotherhood Alliance, namely the MNDAA, the Arakan Army, and the Ta'ang National Liberation Army, launched a surprise attack on a Myanmar military outpost under the pretext of "anti-telecom fraud", which was known as Operation 1027. The MNDAA issued a statement saying that the reason for launching the attack was to assist China in cracking down on the telecom fraud group operated by the four major families in northern Myanmar. This action led to the Myanmar military government, headed by Min Aung Hlaing, losing control of northern Myanmar, and the four major families and the Ming Xuechang family, which were protected by them, also lost power in the conflict.

On 30 October, the Myanmar military government searched the Wohushan Villa and arrested 700 Chinese members of a telecom fraud group. On the same day, the head of the Myanmar military government, Min Aung Hlaing, accepted an interview with Phoenix Television and admitted that the Tatmadaw had not taken effective action against the leaders of the fraud in northern Myanmar. On 31 October, another 300 Chinese members of the Wohushan Villa telecom fraud group who were on the run were arrested.

On the night of 15 November, the Myanmar authorities carried out an operation to arrest the Ming Xuechang family. According to the Myanmar authorities, Ming Xuechang "committed suicide" during the operation. On November 16, the arrested members of the Ming family, Ming Guoping, Ming Julan, and Ming Zhenzhen, were handed over to the Chinese police at the Nansan border crossing between China and Myanmar.

== Investigation and trial ==
Following the 1020 incident, the Ministry of Public Security of China ordered the Wenzhou Public Security Bureau to supervise the investigation and established a special task force in conjunction with the public security organs of Kunming and Lincang. The task force first screened suspected telecom fraud suspects transferred from northern Myanmar to China, identifying over 400 eyewitnesses or witnesses to the 1020 incident. Among them, some testified to the police that Zhenzhen ordered the destruction of evidence after the incident and buried three victims. This prompted Chinese public security authorities to issue arrest warrants for Ming Xuechang and other members of the Ming family. After the Ming family members were extradited in November 2023, law enforcement officers from China and Myanmar went to Laukkai, Myanmar to complete the investigation and evidence collection work, and found the remains of the victims, the ashes of some burned people, gun marks, bullets and blood samples.

On 5 September 2024, the main members of the Ming family criminal group were transferred to the Wenzhou Municipal People's Procuratorate for review and prosecution. On 30 December 2024, the Wenzhou Procuratorate filed a public prosecution against 39 defendants (16 of whom were citizens of Myanmar) in the Wenzhou Intermediate People's Court. The charges involved included fraud, intentional homicide, intentional injury, illegal detention, operating a casino, drug trafficking, and organizing prostitution. The case involved a total of 1,110 volumes of case files, nearly 15,000 pieces of documentary evidence, physical evidence and other evidence materials, and 50 terabytes of electronic data. Wang Sheng, the executive deputy chief procurator of the Wenzhou Municipal People's Procuratorate, said in an interview with a reporter from China Central Television that, in accordance with the relevant provisions of Articles 6, 8 and 9 of the Criminal Law of China, China has the right to exercise criminal jurisdiction over the criminal acts allegedly committed by the Ming family criminal group in northern Myanmar. The procuratorate will seek sentencing recommendations from the court for defendants whose methods are particularly cruel, whose crimes are particularly heinous, whose subjective malice is extremely deep, whose personal and social danger is extremely great, and whose criminal consequences and crimes are extremely serious.

From 14 to 19 February 2025, the Intermediate People's Court of Wenzhou City held a public hearing for the first instance trial of 23 defendants, including Ming Guoping, Ming Zhenzhen, Bi Huijun, Ming Julan, and Wu Hongming, on charges of fraud, intentional homicide, intentional injury, illegal detention, extortion, operating a casino, organizing prostitution, drug trafficking, organizing others to illegally cross the border, illegally crossing the border, and infringing on citizens' personal information. Ming Guoan and others were dealt with in a separate case. On 29 September 2025, the Wenzhou Intermediate People's Court publicly announced the first-instance verdict in the Ming family criminal gang case. Eleven defendants, including Ming Guoping, Ming Zhenzhen, Zhou Weichang, Wu Hongming, Wu Senlong, and Fu Yubin, were sentenced to death; five defendants, including Yang Zhengxi and Fu Chengzhi, were sentenced to death with a two-year reprieve; eleven defendants, including Luo Jianzhang and Qiu Zhi, were sentenced to life imprisonment; and twelve defendants, including Bi Huijun and Jiang Ji, were sentenced to prison terms ranging from five to twenty-four years, with corresponding additional penalties such as fines, confiscation of property, and deportation. On 29 January 2026, 11 criminals, including Ming Guoping, Ming Zhenzhen, Zhou Weichang, Wu Hongming, Wu Senlong, and Fu Yubin, were executed.
