= Four Families of Kokang =

Four family groups led by four military and political figures

- Simplified Chinese: 果敢四大家族
- Traditional Chinese: 果敢四大家族
Transcriptions
Standard Mandarin
- Hanyu Pinyin: Guǒgǎn sìdà jiāzú

Four Families of Northern Myanmar
- Simplified Chinese: 缅北四大家族
- Traditional Chinese: 緬北四大家族
Transcriptions
Standard Mandarin
- Hanyu Pinyin: Miǎnběi sìdà jiāzú

The Four Families of Kokang, also known as the Four Families of Northern Myanmar, were the four family groups led by four military and political figures in the Kokang region of northern Myanmar: Bai Suocheng, Wei Chaoren, Liu Guoxi and Ming Xuechang.

All four were once under the command of Pheung Kya-shin, the "King of Kokang" and chairman of the First Special Region of Shan State. However, when Myanmar's military junta launched the 2009 Kokang incident to suppress Pheung Kya-shin's Myanmar National Democratic Alliance Army (MNDAA), the four suddenly defected to the military government and assisted the government troops in expelling the Peng family from Kokang. Subsequently, the four were supported by the Myanmar military junta and controlled the local politics, economy and military, and participated extensively in gambling, drugs, telecommunications fraud and other criminal businesses. Although Liu Zhengxiang, another drug dealer in Kokang, was not closely related to the Peng family and had weak political power, he was often regarded as a rising star and was compared with the four major families because of his great wealth. Sometimes he was referred to as one of the "Five Families" along with the other four families. The families often fought each other for fraudsters, but generally maintained a balance of power.

On 20 October 2023, following the 1020 incident, the Ming family was exposed for murdering a Chinese undercover police officer, which led the Chinese government to support the Three Brotherhood Alliance to launch the Operation 1027 on northern Myanmar a week later. In the end, the military junta lost northern Myanmar, the MNDAA took back control, and the major families supported by the military junta were also destroyed and defeated as a result. In November 2023, the Ming Xuechang family was the first to be destroyed; on 6 January 2024, the Tatmadaw stationed in the Kokang region surrendered to the Three Brotherhood Alliance, and the rule of the four major families in the Kokang region ended. On 30 January, the Burmese police handed over six leaders, Bai Suocheng, Bai Yingcang, Wei Huairen, Liu Zhengxiang, Liu Zhengmao and Xu Laofa, and four other criminal suspects to the public security organs of China. From 2025 onwards, the four major families, except for the Liu Guoxi family, and their henchmen were successively tried by the judicial authorities of China.

== Background ==
=== Bai Suocheng family ===
Bai Suocheng (Burmese: ပယ်ဆောက်ချိန်, romanized: pai hcauk hkyin; 14 May 1950 – 11 November 2025), whose wife was Li Xiaosuo, was the first head of the Kokang Self-Administered Zone and a member of the Amyotha Hluttaw. He was a former subordinate of Pheung Kya-shin, having began to follow him in 1965. In 1989, he became the deputy commander of the Myanmar National Democratic Alliance Army (MNDAA). Bai Suocheng was always regarded as Pheung's deputy until Pheung was defeated in the 2009 Kokang incident. He betrayed him, allied with the Myanmar military junta, and became one of the leaders of Kokang.

Bai Suocheng's eldest son, Bai Yingneng (Burmese name Khin Maung Lwin), was the secretary of the Kokang Union Solidarity and Development Party and the chairman of the Yum! Group, a business owned by Bai Suocheng's family. According to a report by HK01, Yum! Group operated in real estate, gambling, and entertainment industries and is a political and business entity. Bai Yingcang, the son of Bai Suocheng, was in charge of the Kokang militia brigade, which is considered one of the three major armed forces in Kokang besides the Tatmadaw. Bai Yingcang was the general manager of Baisheng Casino. He was the vice president of the Kokang Youth Federation. He became the captain of the Kokang militia brigade at the age of 25, and also served as the deputy director of the Kokang Finance Bureau and the deputy director of the Economic Development Administration. According to a report by Ta Kung Pao, Bai Yingcang often showed fitness videos and his luxurious lifestyle on Chinese social media. On Bai Yingcang's 30th birthday, he held a birthday party at the Cangsheng Technology Telecom Fraud Park, where many artists, including Eric Tsang, Wong Yat-fei, Charlie Cho, Du Xudong, and Hou Yaohua, recorded celebratory videos to congratulate Bai Yingcang on his birthday.

Although the Bai family ran a criminal gang, they also ran charitable affairs. Bai Suocheng established the Kokang Education Foundation in August 2019, donating funds to the Kokang Education and Culture Department every year, with a total donation of ¥27.57 million renminbi. Bai Suocheng's eldest daughter, Bai Yingxiang, was the director of the Kokang Women's Association, and she founded the Kokang Charity Foundation. Bai Yingxiang and Bai Suocheng's second daughter, Bai Yinglan, often attend various charity events. According to am730, Bai Yinglan managed the hotel and tourism business of Xinbaili Company under the Bai family, but in reality, she was engaged in gambling, pornography and fraud. Bai Suocheng's third daughter, Bai Yingping, and fourth daughter, Bai Yinggai, were directors of the Baisheng Group. Bai Yinggai was also a director of the Kokang Charity Foundation. Bai Yinggai's husband is Cao Qiangli, who came from Wenzhou, Zhejiang, China. He was also a member of a fraud ring in northern Myanmar. Bai Yinggai and he jointly operated the fraud ring.

On 10 December 2023, Bai Suocheng, Bai Yingcang, and Bai Yinglan were placed on a wanted list by the Chinese police. On 30 January 2024, Bai Suocheng and Bai Yingcang were handed over to the Chinese police. In July 2025, Bai Suocheng, Bai Yingcang, and 21 others were prosecuted by the Shenzhen Municipal People's Procuratorate. From 19 to 22 September 2025, the Shenzhen Intermediate People's Court held a first-instance trial of Bai Suocheng, Bai Yingcang, and 21 other defendants. On 4 November, the Intermediate People's Court of Shenzhen publicly pronounced its first-instance judgment, sentencing five defendants, Bai Suocheng, Bai Yingcang, Yang Liqiang, Hu Xiaojiang and Chen Guangyi, to death; sentencing two defendants, Li Fushou and Li Zhide, to death with a two-year reprieve; sentencing five defendants, including Guo Jianzheng and Pan Xian, to life imprisonment; and sentencing nine defendants, including Li Longhua and Luo Wending, to fixed-term imprisonment ranging from three to twenty years, with corresponding additional penalties such as fines, confiscation of property, and deportation. Bai Suocheng died of illness in prison shortly afterward, and four death row inmates, including Bai Yingcang, have been executed.

| | | Bai Suocheng | | Li Xiaosuo |
| Bai Yingneng | Bai Yingcang | | Bai Yingxiang | Bai Yinglan | Bai Yingping | Bai Yinggai | Cao Qiangli |

=== Wei Chaoren family ===
The Wei family had a self-contained political, military, and business "iron triangle" in northern Myanmar, and had created a model of armed violence control in the telecom fraud park, which was later imitated by other major families. Its characteristic among the four major families is that it had a border defense battalion authorized by the state, which is an organized armed force, with most of the armed forces of other families being spontaneously formed and funded by themselves.

Wei Chaoren (Burmese: ဝေချောင်ရန်, romanized: we hkyaung ran; born 16 October 1952) was one of the leaders of the Kokang region and served as the deputy commander-in-chief and chief of staff of the MNDAA. He was a former subordinate of Pheung Kya-shin until Pheung was defeated in the 2009 Kokang incident, when he betrayed him and allied with the Myanmar military junta, becoming one of the leaders of Kokang. According to sources cited by Newtalk News, after Pheung Kya-shin's death, he expanded his illegal businesses and created the family business Henry Group.

Wei Chaoren’s younger brother, Wei Huairen (known to the Kokang people as "Wei San"), was the chairman of the Kokang Armed Forces and was in charge of the Kokang Border Defense Battalion, which was considered one of the three major armed forces in Kokang besides the Burmese government army. Wei Rong, daughter of Wei Chaoren, was a member of the Old Street Administrative Management Committee and a director of the Wei family's Henry Group. Her husband was Lin Chaoqing, chairman of the Myanmar Lingzhou Group. The Henry Group ostensibly operates in the hotel, real estate and jewelry industries, but in reality it was involved in telecommunications fraud, human trafficking and gambling. According to sources cited by Newtalk News, Wei Rong was highly educated and had been more active in operating illegal industries than her father, Wei Chaoren, since joining the Henry Group. She had designed a large number of scams and often appears on social media to create the illusion of high salaries and easy jobs to attract Chinese people to Kokang for job hunting, thereby depriving them of their freedom and making them scammers. These people may face torture, being sold to other parks or having their organs harvested.

Wei Qinghai, son of Wei Chaoren, was a member of the Border Defense Forces Supervisory Committee. Wei Qingtao, son of Wei Chaoren, was the president of the Henry Group. In addition to working for the Henry Group, he also worked in the military. In October 2023, Wei Qingtao was arrested by Chinese police in Yunnan. Wei Huairen’s eldest son, Wei Qingsong, was a member of the Kokang Border Defense Battalion’s Supervisory Committee and the controller of the telecom fraud park "VIS (or Weisheng) Technology Park". Wei Chaoren's nephew, Chen Dawei, was an alternate member of the Kokang Self-Administered Zone Border Defense Force Supervisory Committee. He was taken care of by the Wei brothers and controlled the military power of a border defense battalion in Kokang. He took pleasure in killing people. When he became sworn brothers with his fraudster, he even used people as sacrifices.

On 10 December 2023, Wei Huairen, Wei Rong, and Wei Qingsong were placed on a wanted list by the Chinese police. In January 2024, Wei Huairen was arrested by the Three Brotherhood Alliance forces. On 30 January 2024, Wei Huairen was handed over to the Chinese police.

| | Wei Chaoren | | | Wei Huairen (Wei San) |
| Wei Rong | Lin Chaoqing | Wei Qingtao | Wei Qinghai | | Wei Qingsong |

=== Liu Guoxi family ===
Liu Guoxi (1 April 1944 – 8 January 2020) was one of the leaders of the Kokang region. He served as the Secretary-General of the First Special Region Government of Shan State, the Vice Chairman of the Provisional Administrative Management Committee, and a member of the Amyotha Hluttaw. He was a former subordinate of Pheung Kya-shin. He betrayed Pheung when he was defeated in the 2009 Kokang incident, and allied with the Myanmar military junta, becoming one of the leaders of Kokang.

He has three sons and one daughter, named Liu Deshou, Liu Dechao, Liu Dehong and Liu Hanzhu respectively. He ran mining, casino and hotel businesses in Kokang. His third son, Liu Dehong, was a member of the Kokang Self-Administered Zone People's Assembly.

| | Liu Guoxi |
| Liu Deshou | Liu Dechao | Liu Dehong | Liu Hanzhu |

=== Ming Xuechang family ===
Ming Xuechang

Ming Xuechang (Burmese: မြီရှောက်ချန်း, romanized: mye shout hkyann; 5 July 1954 – 15 November 2023), former Kokang County Magistrate, former member of the Shan State Parliament of Myanmar, and former member of the Kokang Self-Administered Zone Leadership Committee. He was a former subordinate of Pheung Kya-shin, who betrayed him when Pheung Kya-shin was defeated in the 2009 Kokang incident, and allied with the Myanmar military junta, becoming one of the leaders of Kokang. Ming Xuechang founded the family business Sun and Moon Group. Under his leadership, the Ming family became a rising star among the four major families. His family's operation of the Wohushanzhuang telecom fraud park became one of the symbols of telecom fraud in northern Myanmar. In October 2023, Ming Xuechang's son-in-law Bi Huijun was arrested by Chinese police in Yunnan. On 15 November 2023, Ming Xuechang committed suicide when he was arrested by the Myanmar authorities. The next day, his two children, Ming Guoping and Ming Julan, and his granddaughter, Ming Zhenzhen, were handed over to the Chinese police, and the Ming Xuechang family was completely wiped out. On 30 December 2024, the Ming family was prosecuted. On 29 September 2025, the Wenzhou Intermediate People's Court sentenced Ming Guoping and Ming Zhenzhen to death in the first instance. Bi Huijun was sentenced to imprisonment.

==== Second generation ====
Ming Xuechang's eldest son, Ming Guoan, is the chairman of the Sun Moon Group. He was in charge of the Kokang police force and was the battalion commander of the 21st battalion. This armed force was considered one of the three major armed forces in Kokang besides the Tatmadaw. He was paralyzed after falling off his horse and later went to Thailand for treatment. Ming Xuechang’s second son, Ming Guoping (1981 – January 29, 2026), was the captain of the militia squadron of Shiyuanzi Township, Kokang. After his brother Ming Guoan fell off a horse and became paralyzed, he actually controlled the 21st Battalion of the Kokang Police Force and operated the Shiyuanzi Telecom Fraud Park. On 29 January 2026, Ming Guoping was executed. Ming Xuechang’s eldest daughter, Ming Julan (born 26 August 1981), is married to Bi Huijun. Ming Julan has a household registration and ID card in Zhenkang County, Lincang, Yunnan, China.

==== Third generation ====
Ming Guangcai, the grandson, was the deputy company commander of the 3rd Company of the 21st Battalion of the Kokang Police Force. Ming Guangzhong (Burmese name Aung Win Oo), the grandson of Ming Xuechang and son of Ming Guoan, was rumored to have been admitted to Peking University, but this news was subsequently denied by Peking University. Ming Zhenzhen, granddaughter of Ming Xuechang (1 July 1996 – 29 January 2026), is the president of the Kokang Charity Association and has a household registration and ID card in Gengma Dai and Va Autonomous County, Lincang, Yunnan, China. She and Ming Guoping jointly commanded the Kokang police force. In September 2023, Ming Zhenzhen went to Naypyidaw, the capital of Myanmar, and was awarded an honorary medal by the Myanmar government. On 29 January 2026, Ming Zhenzhen was executed.

Ming Xuechang
Ming Guo'an | Ming Guoping | Ming Julan | Bi Huijun
Ming Guangzhong | Ming Guangcai | Ming Zhenzhen

The report indicates that Ming Guangcai and Ming Zhenzhen are grandchildren of Ming Xuechang, but their lineage is unknown.

=== Liu Zhengxiang family ===
Liu Zhengxiang

Liu Zhengxiang (Burmese: လီကျိန်းချန်, romanized: li kyin hkyan; born 24 April 1963) is a native of Kokang, Myanmar, and the richest man in the Kokang region. He founded the family business Fulilai Group in 1992 and serves as its chairman. Because Liu Zhengxiang was not from Pheung Kya-shin's direct line, he was not considered one of the four major families most of the time, and was only sometimes referred to as one of the "Five Families of Kokang". His Fulilai Group had close ties with the Myanmar military government. It operated casinos, real estate and other businesses, as well as a telecom fraud group with more than 10,000 employees.

Liu Zhengxiang's second younger brother, Liu Zhengqi (Burmese name Maung Maung), was the president of the Fulilai Group, and his third younger brother, Liu Zhengchang, was a director of the Fulilai Group and the president of the Kokang National Youth Association. In October 2023, Liu Zhengqi was arrested by Chinese police in Yunnan. Liu Zhengxiang’s eldest son, Liu Jikai, was a director of the Fulilai Group, and his second son, Liu Jiguang, was a director of the Fulilai Group and served as the director of the Health Department of the Kokang Self-Administered Zone.

On 10 December 2023, Liu Zhengxiang and Liu Jiguang were placed on a wanted list by the Chinese police. On 30 January 2024, Liu Zhengxiang and his cousin Liu Zhengmao were handed over to Chinese police.

| Liu Zhengxiang | Liu Zhengqi | Liu Zhengchang |
| Liu Jikai | Liu Jiguang |

=== Other families ===
The report by The Paper also mentioned families such as the Guo family and the Xu family, whose fraud achievements were no worse than those of the five major families.

== Destruction ==
In the summer of 2023, the Ministry of Public Security of China decided to abandon the method of negotiating to eradicate telecom fraud in northern Myanmar and instead "open the way." On 1 October 2023, at the Nansan Port in Lincang, Yunnan, important members of the four major families, including Wei Qingtao and Liu Zhengqi, were arrested. The whole process took about 10 minutes.

On 20 October, multiple media reports indicated that hundreds of Chinese citizens were trapped in the Wohushanzhuang telecom fraud park controlled by the Ming Xuechang family and engaged in telecom fraud. Under pressure from China's anti-telecom fraud campaign, the Ming family's militia transferred Chinese telecom fraud personnel to other locations. During the transfer, some attempted to escape, and Chinese undercover police officers who were assisting the Chinese citizens revealed their identities and tried to stop the Ming family militia from transferring them, but were instead killed. Several Chinese citizens died in the incident, which was known as the 1020 incident. However, in December 2024, the Chinese public security authorities stated that the victims at the time were not police officers.

The 1020 incident angered the Chinese side. On October 27, the three-brother alliance of the anti-Myanmar military government armed forces, the MNDAA, the Arakan Army and the Ta'ang National Liberation Army, launched a surprise attack on a Myanmar military outpost under the pretext of "anti-telecom fraud". This was known as Operation 1027. The MNDAA issued a statement saying that the reason for launching the attack was to assist China in cracking down on the telecom fraud group operated by the four major families in northern Myanmar. Operation 1027 was aimed at the four major families, especially the Bai Suocheng family, which made its fortune by defecting from Pheung Kya-shin, and the Ming Xuechang family, the instigator of the 1020 incident. The Liu Zhengxiang family was not targeted because it was not a defector of Pheung Kya-shin. This action led to the Myanmar military government, headed by Min Aung Hlaing, losing control of northern Myanmar. The four major families and the Ming Xuechang family, which were protected by the government, also lost power in the conflict. As the three brothers' alliance achieved successive victories, the Kokang militia led by Bai Yingcang was besieged in Laukkai. Bai Suocheng called Peng Daxun, the commander of the MNDAA, to seek peace. Peng Daxun informed Bai Suocheng's family that they only had one option: to surrender to China.

From 3 to 5 November, Nong Rong, Assistant Minister of Foreign Affairs of China, visited Myanmar and received a promise from the Myanmar military junta to cooperate with China in combating telecom fraud and online gambling. On the morning of 12 November, videos of repentance by Bi Huijun, Wei Qingtao and Liu Zhengqi, members of the four major families and the Ming Xuechang family who were arrested by China, began to circulate online. Wei Qingtao was arrested by the Chinese side on 1 October after participating in a cross-border marathon in Zhenkang County, Yunnan. The content of the videos was similar. In the videos, they said that they were doing well in China, and after being arrested, they reflected on how much harm the telecom fraud had caused. They reminded the family members who had not been arrested that "the Chinese government will not stop until it eliminates telecom fraud, and if any more Chinese people are injured or killed, they will make them pay for their blood debts." According to a report in Yangcheng Evening News, the Myanmar military junta issued an arrest warrant for Bai Yingcang.

Because Wei Rong was involved in multiple crimes of fraud and human trafficking, he was considered a key target for crackdown. The MNDAA offered a reward of US$10 million for Wei Rong. According to a report by Haobo News, Wei Rong fled to North America via Thailand, Cambodia and Singapore. The Wei family hired mercenaries to transfer the core members of the fraud park to a safe location. On the night of 15 November, the Myanmar authorities carried out an operation to arrest the Ming Xuechang family. Ming Xuechang committed suicide during the operation. On 16 November, the arrested members of the Ming family, Ming Guoping, Ming Julan, and Ming Zhenzhen, were handed over to the Chinese police at the Nansan border crossing between China and Myanmar. On 23 November, Bai Yingneng stated on his WeChat public platform that, given the tense situation in Kokang, he requested that Chinese citizens who had illegally entered Myanmar and those involved in telecom fraud immediately return to China from the Yanglongzhai border crossing. On 10 December, Bai Suocheng, Bai Yingcang, and Bai Yinglan of the Bai Suocheng family were wanted by the Dalian Public Security Bureau; Wei Huairen, Wei Rong, and Wei Qingsong of the Wei Chaoren family were wanted by the Quanzhou Public Security Bureau; and Liu Zhengxiang, Liu Jiguang, and Liu Zhengmao of the Liu Zhengxiang family were wanted by the Longyan Public Security Bureau. At this point, only the Liu Guoxi family among the four major families of Kokang had not yet had any members wanted by the Chinese police.

On 30 January 2024, Myanmar police transferred six ringleaders, Bai Suocheng, Bai Yingcang, Wei Huairen, Liu Zhengxiang, Liu Zhengmao, and Xu Laofa, along with four other major criminal suspects, to the public security authorities of China. On 29 September, another 20 suspects involved in telecommunications and online fraud affiliated with the four major families were extradited from Myanmar back to China.

=== Subsequent trial ===
On 5 September 2024, the main members of the Ming family criminal gang were transferred to the Wenzhou Municipal People's Procuratorate for review and prosecution. On 30 December 2024, the Wenzhou Municipal People's Procuratorate filed a public prosecution against 39 defendants, including Ming Guoping and Ming Zhenzhen, in the Wenzhou Intermediate People's Court. The charges involved included fraud, intentional homicide, intentional injury, illegal detention, operating a casino, drug trafficking, and organizing prostitution. From 14 to 19 February 2025, the Wenzhou Intermediate People's Court held a public hearing for the first instance trial of 23 defendants, including Ming Guoping, Ming Zhenzhen, Bi Huijun, Ming Julan, and Wu Hongming, on charges of fraud, intentional homicide, intentional injury, illegal detention, extortion, operating a casino, organizing prostitution, drug trafficking, organizing others to illegally cross the border, illegally crossing the border, and infringing on citizens' personal information. Ming Guoan and others were dealt with in a separate case. On 29 September 2025, the Wenzhou Intermediate People's Court sentenced 11 defendants, including Ming Guoping, Ming Zhenzhen, Zhou Weichang, Wu Hongming, Wu Senlong, and Fu Yubin, to death in the first instance; sentenced 5 defendants, including Yang Zhengxi and Fu Chengzhi, to death with a two-year reprieve ; sentenced 11 defendants, including Luo Jianzhang and Qiu Zhi, to life imprisonment; and sentenced 12 defendants, including Bi Huijun and Jiang Ji, to fixed-term imprisonment ranging from 5 to 24 years, with corresponding additional penalties such as fines, confiscation of property, and deportation. On 29 January 2026, after receiving the criminal ruling and death penalty execution order from the Supreme People's Court, the Wenzhou Intermediate People's Court pronounced and executed the death sentences on 11 criminals, including Ming Guoping, Ming Zhenzhen, Zhou Weichang, Wu Hongming, Wu Senlong, and Fu Yubin, in accordance with the law.

On 11 July 2025, the Shenzhen Municipal People’s Procuratorate filed a public prosecution against Bai Suocheng, Bai Yingcang and 21 other defendants with the Shenzhen Intermediate People’s Court, accusing them of fraud, operating a casino, extortion, intentional homicide, intentional injury, kidnapping and trafficking and manufacturing drugs. On 4 November, 2025, the Shenzhen Intermediate People’s Court publicly pronounced the first-instance judgment on the Bai family criminal group case, sentencing Bai Suocheng, Bai Yingcang, Yang Liqiang, Hu Xiaojiang and Chen Guangyi to death; sentencing Li Fushou and Li Zhide to death with a two-year reprieve ; sentencing Guo Jianzheng, Pan Xian and 5 others to life imprisonment; and sentencing nine other defendants to fixed-term imprisonment ranging from 3 to 20 years, with corresponding fines, confiscation of property and deportation. After the first-instance judgment, Bai Suocheng died of illness, and the other four who were sentenced to death appealed, but the second instance upheld the original judgment. On 2 February 2026, Bai Yingcang and three other death row inmates were executed.
