= Liu Zhengxiang =

Burmese politician

- 刘正祥

Member of the Kokang Self-Administered Zone Leading Body
- In office 30 March 2011 – 3 February 2021
- Chairman: Bai Suocheng; Zhao Deqiang

Director of the Finance Bureau of the Kokang Self-Administered Zone
- In office 30 March 2011 – ？
- Deputy: Li Zhifu; Bai Yingneng

Member of the Provisional Administrative Committee of the First Special Region of Shan State
- In office 22 November 2010 – 30 March 2011
- Chairman: Bai Suocheng

Head of the Finance Department of the Provisional Administrative Committee of the First Special Region of Shan State
- In office 2010 – 30 March 2011
- Deputy: Lu Xiaotu (until autumn 2010); Lu Guangxian (until autumn 2010); Li Zhifu; Bai Yingneng
- Chairman: Bai Suocheng

Personal details
- Born: April 24, 1963 (age 63) Kokang, Myanmar
- Occupation: Politician, businessman
- Nickname: Liu Abao

Liu Zhengxiang (Chinese: 刘正祥 Burmese: လီကျိန်းချန်, romanized: li kyin: hkyan; born April 24, 1963), also known as Liu Abao (Chinese: 刘阿宝, Burmese: လျိုအားပေါက်, romanized: lyui a: pauk), is a Burmese politician, businessman and Buddhist layperson from Kokang.

Liu Zhengxiang started his career in drug trafficking, later founding the Fulilai Group and serving as its chairman. After the 2009 Kokang incident, he held various positions including member of the Provisional Management Committee of the First Special Region, Director of the Finance Bureau of the Kokang Self-Administered Zone, and member of the Kokang Self-Administered Zone Leading Body. During the Kokang Self-Administered Zone era, the Liu family was one of the Four Families of Kokang, and also the family with the closest relationship with the Myanmar government among the four family. Its main sphere of influence was Dongcheng. As the richest man in Kokang, Liu Zhengxiang's family was the richest among the four major families, but the weakest in terms of political power.

On 10 December 2023, Liu Zhengxiang was identified by China's Ministry of Public Security as one of the important leaders of a telecommunications network fraud criminal group and was wanted by the Chinese police. On 30 January 2024, he was handed over to the Chinese police by the Myanmar police.

== Biography ==
Liu Zhengxiang was born in 1963, and has a primary school education. In 1999, he served as the deputy head of Hongyan Township in Kokang and concurrently as the principal of Hongyan School. In the same year, he founded the Fully Light Group. In 1996, he became the deputy head of Hongxing District. From 1997, he served as the deputy minister of the Development Department and the Deputy Minister of the External Liaison Department of the First Special Region of Shan State. After the outbreak of the 2009 Kokang incident and Pheung Kya-shin left Kokang, the Provisional Administrative Management Committee of the First Special Region of Shan State was established, and Liu Zhengxiang served as the Minister of Finance. In 2011, the Kokang Self-Administered Zone was established, and he served as a member of the first and second committees of the Autonomous Region Leading Body, in charge of financial work. Later, he became the president of the Kokang Chamber of Commerce and Industry.

On 10 December 2023, Liu Zhengxiang, as an important leader of the Kokang telecom fraud group in northern Myanmar, was wanted by the Longyan Public Security Bureau of Fujian Province, China. On 30 Januaru 2024, the Ministry of Public Security of China announced that Bai Suocheng, Liu Zhengxiang and 10 other suspects in Myanmar who were wanted by China for fraud were arrested by the Myanmar police and transferred to China. In October 2025, the case of the Liu family criminal group in northern Myanmar was submitted to the public prosecution in accordance with the law.

== Honor ==
Liu Zhengxiang has received honors such as the Myanmar Religious Outstanding Contribution Award, the Myanmar State Supreme Outstanding Contribution Award for Propagating Buddhism, and the Shan State Social Outstanding Contribution Award.

== Family ==
Liu Zhengxiang is the second child in his family, the son of Liu Hone Law. He has one older sister and two younger brothers.

- Father: Liu Hone Law
  - Sister
  - Brother: Liu Zhengqi, whose Burmese name is Maung Maung, is the president of the Fulilai Group and also serves as the secretary of the Kokang Self-Administered Zone Party Committee of the Union Solidarity and Development Party. He was elected as a member of the Shan State Hluttaw in 2020. In October 2023, Liu Zhengqi and 11 Kokang businessmen were arrested in China. They were suspected of being involved in telecommunications fraud. On 12 November 2023, Liu Zhengqi, Wei Qingtao, and Bi Huijun recorded a confession video together, asking their families to release the Chinese people in the telecommunications fraud park as soon as possible.
  - Brother: Liu Zhengchang, Director of Fulilai Group, President of Kokang National Youth Association, and Chairman of Kokang Shuanglong School. His cousin Liu Zhengmao served as General Manager of Fulilai Group and was wanted by the Longyan Public Security Bureau of Fujian Province on 10 December 2023.
- Wife: Li
  - Eldest daughter
  - Second daughter
  - Eldest son: Liu Jikai (born March 1990), nicknamed Sanbiaozi, is a director of Fulilai Group and the general manager of Pacific Entertainment Company, a subsidiary of Fulilai Group.
  - Second son: Liu Jiguang (born 5 June 1993), whose Chinese household registration name is Li Huaguang, is the director of the Health Bureau of Kokang Self-Administered Zone and the executive director of the Fulilai Group. He was wanted by the Longyan Public Security Bureau of Fujian Province on 10 December 2023.
  - Three girls
