= Attempted assassination of Bai Yingneng =

Failed assassination attempt in Kokang, Myanmar

- Part of the Myanmar civil war (2021–present)
Date	February 5, 2021
Location	Nadi, Hsenwi-Kunlong road
Result	Indecisive: MNDAA fail to assassinate Bai; MNDAA evade capture by Kokang BGF and Tatmadaw

Belligerents
MNDAA	Kokang Border Guard Forces; Tatmadaw

Strength
20	Unknown

Casualties and losses
None	3 police officers killed, 5 injured
- 9 civilians killed, 7 injured

The attempted assassination of Bai Yingneng was the first attack by the Myanmar National Democratic Alliance Army (MNDAA) on Tatmadaw-aligned Kokang Border Guard Forces in Kokang, Myanmar. On February 5, 2021, MNDAA fighters ambushed a convoy transporting ousted governor Bai Yingneng, the son of former Kokang leader Bai Suocheng, killing nine civilians and three of Bai's bodyguards.

== Background ==
In 2009, the Myanmar Army (known as the Tatmadaw) launched an offensive on the Myanmar National Democratic Alliance Army (MNDAA), a rebel group based in Kokang, an ethnic Chinese area of northern Myanmar. The offensive severely weakened the MNDAA and northern Myanmar ethnic armed groups and led to the rise of Min Aung Hlaing. The Myanmar government created a government in Kokang that was sympathetic to the Tatmadaw, along with the Kokang Border Guard Forces, a paramilitary group that helps legitimize the Tatmadaw in the region and secure trade routes from Myanmar to the Chinese border in Kokang.

On February 1, 2021, Min Aung Hlaing and the Tatmadaw overthrew the democratically elected government of Aung San Suu Kyi, breaking all ceasefires and peace agreements with Myanmar rebel groups. Bai Yingneng, the head of Kokang and son of former Kokang leader Bai Suocheng, was ousted from his position by the Tatmadaw in the coup. On the weekend of February 5, the Tatmadaw and Kokang BGF began preparations to attack MNDAA forces.

== Assassination attempt ==
As Bai's convoy was travelling between Hsenwi and Kunlong townships, MNDAA forces ambushed it near the town of Nadi between 2:30 and 3pm on February 5. Bai received surgery in Lashio and was returning to Laukkai. Around 20 MNDAA fighters were positioned on a nearby hillside known as Yasapo when they opened fire, killing nine civilians and three of Bai's teenage bodyguards. Five police officers and seven civilians were injured in the attack as well. Bai himself was unhurt. The civilian deaths happened when the MNDAA fired at a passenger car following Bai's convoy.

Kokang BGF began shooting back at the MNDAA and called in reinforcements from Tatmadaw. The MNDAA fighters fled the area, and Tatmadaw and Kokang BGF launched a cleanup operation. Twenty minutes after the attack began, the Tatmadaw released a statement accusing the MNDAA of perpetrating the attack.

== Aftermath ==
The assassination attempt was the first attack by the MNDAA since the coup began and heightened tension across Kokang and Shan State. Myanmar state media outlet Myawady Daily reported extensively on the ambush in the days there after, which The Irrawaddy stated was an example of the close ties between the Tatmadaw and Bai Yingneng.
