= Wei Chaoren =

Burmese politician

- 魏超仁 ဝေချောင်ရန်

Member of the Shan State Hluttaw
- In office 2011–2016
- Succeeded by: Wei Huairen
- Constituency: Konkyan Township District 1

Member of the Kokang Self-Administered Zone Leading Body
- In office 30 March 2011 – 5 April 2016

Vice Chairman of the Provisional Administrative Committee of the First Special Region of Shan State
- In office 22 November 2009 – 30 March 2011 Serving with Li Zhongxiang, Zhang Dewen and Liu Guoxi
- Chairman: Bai Suocheng
- Preceded by: Office established

Member of the Executive Committee of the Provisional Administrative Committee of the First Special Region of Shan State
- In office 22 November 2009 – 30 March 2011 Serving with Bai Suocheng, Li Zhongxiang, Zhang Dewen and Liu Guoxi
- Chairman: Bai Suocheng
- Preceded by: Office established

Deputy Commander of the Myanmar National Democratic Alliance Army
- In office May 2000 – August 2009 Serving with Peng Deren, Zhang Dewen, Bai Suocheng and Wang Guozheng
- Commander-in-Chief: Peng Jiafu

Chief of General Staff of the Myanmar National Democratic Alliance Army
- In office February 1993 – May 2000
- Deputy Chief of Staff: Zi San
- Preceded by: Li Zhongxiang
- Succeeded by: Zi San

Personal details
- Born: October 16, 1952 (age 74) Mugua Village, Kokang, Myanmar
- Party: Union Solidarity and Development Party
- Other political affiliations: Communist Party of Burma (before 1989)

Military service
- Allegiance: People's Army (1968–1989); Myanmar National Democratic Alliance Army (1989–2009)
- Years of service: 1968–2009

Wei Chaoren (Chinese: 白应能, Burmese: ဝေချောင်ရန်, romanized: we hkyaung ran; born 16 October 1952) is a Burmese political and military figure in Kokang, Myanmar.

Wei was originally a member of the Communist Party of Burma and later joined the Myanmar National Democratic Alliance Army (MNDAA) led by Pheung Kya-shin. After the 2009 Kokang incident, he became one of the leaders of the Kokang Self-Administered Zone and served as the deputy commander-in-chief and chief of staff of the MNDAA. During the Kokang Self-Administered Zone era, the Wei family was one of the Four Families of Kokang. Their sphere of influence was mainly in Jinxiang City. His brother Wei Huairen (Wei San) actually controlled the 1006th Border Defense Battalion of the Border Guard Forces, making the Wei family the only one of the four major families to hold military power.

== Biography ==
Wei Chaoren was born on 16 October 1952 in Mugua Village, Kokang, and his ancestral home is Jiangxi. In 1968, he joined the Burmese People's Army led by the Communist Party of Burma. In his early years, he served as the combat staff officer and deputy director of the combat department of the 8th Brigade of the Northeast Military Region of the Communist Party of Burma, the director of the combat department of the 48th Division, the deputy brigade commander and brigade commander of the 1st Brigade.

In 1989, Pheung Kya-shin and others launched a mutiny in Kokang, broke away from the Communist Party of Burma and established the Myanmar National Democratic Alliance Army. He served as the deputy commander of the 893rd Division of the Alliance Army and the county magistrate of Menggu County. After being stationed in Menggu area, he became the commander of the 893rd Division. After Yang Maoliang took power in 1993, he served as the chief of staff of the Alliance Army. On 8 March, Yang Maoliang established the First Special Zone Military Committee, with Yang Maoliang, Bai Suocheng, Wang Guozheng, Yan En (Li Dehua), Jiang Zhongming, Yang Maoan, and Wei Chaoren serving as standing committee members.

In August 1995, Mengsala, the county magistrate of Menggu County, together with Li Nimen, the former commander of the 893rd Division, Zhao La, the former deputy battalion commander of the 511th Battalion, Hong Laosi, the former deputy district chief of Menggu, and others launched a rebellion, established the Menggu Defense Army, arrested Wei Chaoren and Li Chaohua, and disarmed and expelled them and their allied forces. Yang Maoliang sent troops to suppress the rebellion. Due to the stalemate in the war, in early September, Deputy Commander Bai Suocheng, Jiang Zhongming, and Chief of Staff Wei Chaoren led the Allied Forces Headquarters Guard Battalion across the Salween River to reinforce and occupied Menghong. During this period, Pheung attempted to regain control of Kokang. Yang Maoliang sought help from the Burmese government, and the Burmese government army took the opportunity to occupy key military locations in Kokang. This caused dissatisfaction among the allied forces with Yang Maoliang, resulting in a mutiny and a shift in support to Pheung. Wei Chaoren also led his troops to join Pheung. After Pheung returned to Kokang, Wei Chaoren was appointed as a member of the Special Region Management Committee and deputy commander of the allied forces in May 2000. He later served as the director of the Public Security Bureau, the Director of the Security Bureau, the deputy director of the Narcotics Control Committee, and the director of the Investment Promotion Bureau of the First Special Region of Shan State.

During the Kokang incident in 2009, the Myanmar government issued arrest warrants for Pheung Kya-shin, Peng Jiafu, Peng Deren, and Peng Deli on the grounds that the Peng family owned an illegal weapons manufacturing plant. On 24 August 2009, Bai Suocheng, Wei Chaoren, Liu Guoxi, Ming Xuechang and others launched a coup to seize power, announced their cooperation with the Myanmar government and abandoned resistance. On 25 August, the Provisional Management Committee of the First Special Region of Shan State was established, with Bai Suocheng as chairman, Zhang Dewen, Li Zhongxiang, Yang Zhongwei and Liu Guoxi as vice-chairmen, and Wei Chaoren, Wei Huairen (Wei San), Wang Guozheng, Zi San, Yang Zijun and Ming Xuechang as members. Peng Jiasheng, Peng Jiafu, Peng Deli and others fled to Wa State for refuge. On 22 November, when the temporary management committee was reorganized, a standing committee was added, with Bai Suocheng, Li Zhongxiang, Wei Chaoren, Zhang Dewen and Liu Guoxi as standing committee members. Yang Zijun's membership was revoked, and the remaining members remained in their positions. Wei Chaoren was newly appointed as vice chairman, and Li Guozhong, Yang Xiaojian and Liu Zhengxiang were added as members. Wei Chaoren was in charge of public security and judicial work.

On 7 November 2010, Wei was elected as a member of the Shan State Hluttaw. On 30 March 2011, the Kokang Self-Administered Zone was established, and Bai Suocheng, Ming Xuechang, Jue Seya (representative of the Tatmadaw), Wei Chaoren, Ye Tun Win (representative of the Tatmadaw), Aka Ling (representative of the Tatmadaw), Zhao Deqiang, Liu Zhengxiang, Jin Yanguo (representative of the Benglong ethnic group), and Aung Jiden (representative of the Burmese ethnic group) were sworn in as members of the Kokang Self-Administered Zone Leading Body.

== Family ==
Wei Chaoren is the second child in his family, the son of Wei Fucheng. He has an older brother, a younger brother, and a younger sister.

- Father: Wei Fucheng
  - Brother: Wei Xueren
  - Brother: Wei Huairen, also known as Wei San, was a member of the Executive Committee of the Kokang Self-Administered Zone Leading Body and Chairman of the Supervisory Committee of the 1006 Border Defense Battalion. He also ran the Xin Jinjiang Casino in Laogai.
    - Nephew: Wei Qingsong, whose Chinese registered name is Yang Song, was a member of the Supervisory Committee of the 1006th Border Defense Battalion.
  - Sister: Wei Meiren
    - Nephew: Chen Dawei, alternate member of the 1006 Border Defense Battalion Supervisory Committee. He was arrested in Myanmar on September 29, 2024 and handed over to Chinese police.
- Wife: Chen
  - Female: Wei Rong (born 8 February 1988), whose Chinese household registration name is Chen Rong, serves as the chairman of the Old Street Committee and the Hanley Group. On December 10, 2023, Wei San (Wei Huai Ren), Wei Qing Song, and Wei Rong were wanted by the Quanzhou Public Security Bureau of China.
  - Eldest son: Wei Qinghai, member of the Supervisory Committee of the 1006th Border Defense Battalion
  - Second son: Wei Qingtao, deputy company commander of the 21st Battalion of the Kokang Police Force and president of the Hanley Group. On 1 October 2023, he was arrested in China along with 11 other Kokang businessmen, including Liu Zhengqi, on suspicion of telecommunications fraud. On 12 November, Wei Qingtao, Liu Zhengqi, and Bi Huijun recorded a confession video together, asking their families to release the Chinese people in the telecommunications fraud park as soon as possible.
