= Mawhtike =

Mawhtike မော်ထိုက်မြို့
- Town
- Location in Myanmar
- Coordinates: 24°05′49″N 98°51′40″E
- Country: Myanmar
- State: Shan State
- Self-administered zone: Kokang
- Township: Konkyan Township

Population (2014)
  - Town: 26,290
  - Urban: 424
  - Rural: 25,866
- Time zone: UTC+6.30 (MST)

Mawhtike (Burmese: မော်ထိုက်မြို့) is a town located within Kokang Self-Administered Zone, Shan State, Myanmar (Burma). It is also part of the Kokang Self-Administered Zone.
