= Laukkaing Township =

Laukkaing Township လောက်ကိုင်မြို့နယ်
- Township
- Location in Laukkaing district (Kokang SAZ)
- Coordinates: 23°41′00″N 98°45′00″E
- Country: Myanmar
- State: Shan State
- Self-administered zone: Kokang
- Capital: Laukkai

Area
  - Total: 316.96 sq mi (820.92 km^{2})
- Elevation: 3,100 ft (940 m)
- Highest elevation: 8,317 ft (2,535 m)

Population (2019)
  - Total: 75,555
  - Density: 238.37/sq mi (92.037/km^{2})
  - Ethnicities: Kokang; Palaung; Bamar; Shan
- Time zone: UTC+6.30 (MMT)

Laukkaing Township or Laukkai Township (Burmese: လောက်ကိုင်မြို့နယ်, Chinese: 老街区) is a township located within Laukkaing District, Shan State, Myanmar. It is the principal township of the Kokang Self-Administered Zone. The principal town is Laukkai (Burmese: လောက်ကိုင်မြို့). The township is divided into 137 villages organized into 8 village tracts and 2 towns, each with 3 urban wards. Besides Laukkai, the other town is Chinshwehaw in the southeast of the township.

== Geography ==
Laukkaing shares a border with Kongyan Township in the north, with the People's Republic of China in the north and east, with Kunlong Township in the south and with Kutkai Township in the west. It has 31 border posts, and is situated at 3,100 feet (940 m) above sea level. Few plains can be seen in Laukkai, Mangtonpa, Yanlongkyaing, Pasinkyaw and Namhuhtan. The remaining area is mountainous and from 3,000 to 8,317 feet (2,535 m) above sea level. The total area is 316.96 square miles (820.9 km^{2}) and the population is over 70,000.

Rubber, lychee, mango, walnut and pear are grown in the area as poppy substitutes. Sugarcane, pineapple, corn, buckwheat, soybean and various vegetables are also grown. In November 2025, China sentenced to death several top members of Myanmar mafia clan located in Laukkaing.

There are 4 high schools and 17 primary schools. There is a 50 bedded hospital.

== See also ==
- Lào Cai
