= Konkyan =

Konekyan ကုန်းကြမ်း
- Town
- Location in Myanmar
- Coordinates: 23°49′46″N 98°32′22″E
- Country: Myanmar
- State: Shan State
- Self-administered zone: Kokang
- Township: Konkyan Township

Population (2014)
  - Total: 1,186
- Time zone: UTC+6.30 (MST)

Konkyan (Burmese: ကုန်းကြမ်းမြို့, Chinese: 拱掌) is a town in Konkyan Township, Shan State of Myanmar (formerly Burma). It is also a part of Kokang Self-Administered Zone.

On 12 November 2023, during Operation 1027, all 127 members of Light Infantry Battalion 129 surrendered to the Myanmar National Democratic Alliance Army (MNDAA). On 29 November, during Operation 1027, the MNDAA was able to capture the town of Konkyan following the surrender of the garrison (LIB 125) during the ongoing civil war.
