= Bai Yingneng =

Burmese politician

- 白应能 ခင်မောင်လွင်

Member of the Shan State Hluttaw
- In office 29 January 2016 – 2026
- Preceded by: Bai Suocheng
- Constituency: Laukkai 2nd constituency

Member of the Kokang Self-Administered Zone Leading Body
- In office 2021–2023 Serving with Kyaw Kyaw Oo and Myo Soe Dan
- Chairman: Li Zhengfu

Member of the Executive Committee of the Kokang Self-Administered Zone Leading Body
- In office 5 April 2016 – 3 February 2021 Serving with Wei Huairen and Aung Khe Win
- Chairman: Zhao Deqiang

Personal details
- Born: October 7, 1982 (age 44) Kokang, Myanmar
- Party: Union Solidarity and Development Party
- Spouse: Lu Jianjiao
- Relations: Bai Suocheng (father); Bai Yinglan (elder sister); Bai Yingcang (younger brother)

Bai Yingneng (Chinese: 白应能; born 7 October 1982), also known as Khin Maung Lwin (Burmese: ခင်မောင်လွင်), is a politician in Kokang, Myanmar.

== Biography ==
Bai Yingneng is the eldest son of Bai Suocheng, the first chairman of the Kokang Self-Administered Zone. He is the secretary of the Kokang Union Solidarity and Development Party and also serves as the chairman of Bai Family Industry Group.

In the 2015 Myanmar general election, Bai Yingneng was elected as a member of the Shan State Hluttaw representing the second constituency of Laukkai. On 5 April 2016, Bai Yingneng, Wei Huai Ren (Wei San), and Lieutenant Colonel Aung Khe Win, a representative of the Tatmadaw, took office as members of the Standing Committee of the Second Kokang Self-Administered Zone Leadership Committee. In 2021, he took office as a member of the Third Kokang Self-Administered Zone Leadership Committee along with Lieutenant Colonel Kyaw Kyaw Oo and Myo Soe Dan. On 5 February 2021, he survived an assassination attempt by the Myanmar National Democratic Alliance Army on his way back to Kokang from Lashio.

In the 2020 Myanmar general elections, he was re-elected as a member of the Shan State Hluttaw representing the Laukkai 2 constituency. On 10 December 2023, Bai Suocheng, Bai Yingcang, and Bai Yinglan of the Bai family were wanted by the Dalian Public Security Bureau of Liaoning Province, China. Bai Yingneng was not on the wanted list. From 19 to 22 September 2025, the Shenzhen Intermediate People's Court held a public trial for the first instance of the Bai family criminal group case in northern Myanmar. Bai Yingneng, Bai Yingxiang, Bai Yinglan, Bai Yingping, and Bai Yinggai were dealt with in separate cases. On 9 December 2025, the Shenzhen Public Security Bureau issued a warrant for the arrest of 18 key members of the telecommunications fraud gang who had fled to northern Myanmar. Bai Yingneng, his wife Lu Jianjiao, his sisters Bai Yingxiang, Bai Yinglan, Bai Yingping, and Bai Yinggai, and his brother-in-law Cao Qiangli were all on the wanted list.

== Honors ==
Bai Yingneng was awarded the Myanmar National Religious Outstanding Contribution Award in recognition of his contributions to the propagation of Buddhism.
