= Yang Mao-liang =

- 杨茂良

Political Officer of the Shan State Special region 1
- In office 27 February 1993 – 1 January 1996
- Deputy: Yang Mao-an
- Preceded by: Peng Jiasheng (chairman)
- Succeeded by: Peng Jiasheng (chairman)

Commander of the MNDAA
- In office 27 February 1993 – 1 January 1996
- Deputy: Ai En, Wang Guozheng, Bai Suocheng, Jiang Zhongming
- Preceded by: Peng Jiasheng
- Succeeded by: Peng Jiafu

Deputy General Staff of the MNDAA
- In office 11 March 1989 – 27 February 1993
- General Staff: Li Zhongxiang
- Preceded by: position created
- Succeeded by: Zi San

Personal details
- Born: 1944 (age 81–82) Shi Tung Shwe Village, Kokang, British Burma, British Raj
- Relations: Yang Mao-an, Yang Mao-xian (brother)
- Occupation: politician, businessman

Military service
- Allegiance: Communist Party of Burma (1965–1989); Myanmar National Democratic Alliance Army (1989–1995)
- Years of service: 1965–1995

Yang Mao-liang (Burmese: ရန်မိုးလျံ; Chinese: 杨茂良; also spelled Yang Mouliang or Yang Moe Lyan, born 1944) is a high-ranking member of the Myanmar National Democratic Alliance Army (MNDAA). He was ousted by Peng Jiasheng from MNDAA and Kokang. Yang Mao-Liang established the Peace Myanmar Group company a water and alcoholic beverage manufacture (Myanmar Rum and Myanmar Whisky) at year of 1993.

Yang's brother, Yang Mao-xian, was executed in 1994 by China for his involvement in trafficking heroin into southern China.
