= Peace Myanmar Group =

Burmese conglomerate

Peace Myanmar Group (PMG)
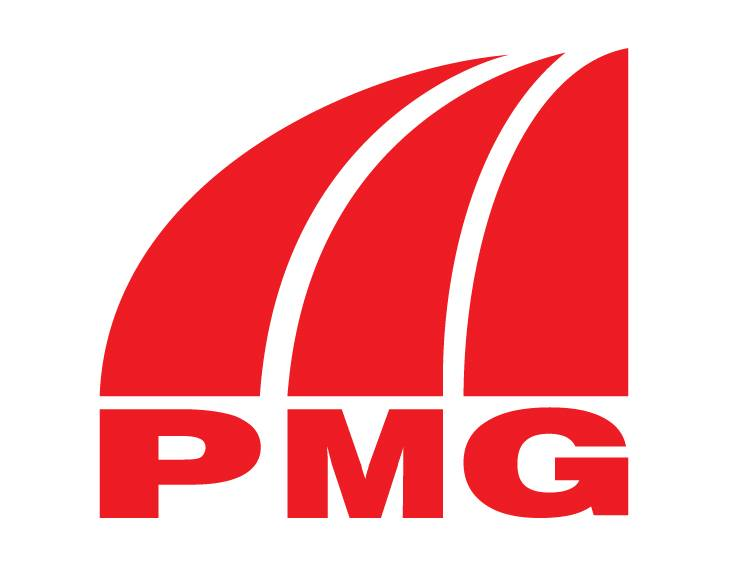
- Native name: ပိ(စ်)မြန်မာဂရု(ပ်)ကုမ္ပဏီ
- Type: Conglomerate
- Industry: Spirits
- Founded: 24 June 1993
- Founder: Win Myint (MD)
- Headquarters: Yangon, Myanmar
- Website: www.pmg.com.mm

The Peace Myanmar Group (Burmese: ပိ(စ်) မြန်မာ ဂရု(ပ်)ကုမ္ပဏီ, also known as PMG), is a leading Myanmar corporation for distribution of alcoholic beverages and bottled drinking water. The company has been in operation since June 24, 1993.

== Organization ==
Peace Myanmar Group was founded by three Burmese businessmen, U Tun Lin,U Thein Win and U Min Aung on 24 June 1993. The major shareholders are the three executive directors. The alcohol distillery, water factory and the headquarters are located in the country’s largest city, Yangon, while other branches spread nationwide.

== History ==
Founded in 1993, the company established its distillery in part to provide an alternative to counterfeit liquor market. In the following year 1994, it set up a purified bottled drinking water factory to bring to market quality drinking water. The company expanded in 2001 by adding distillery capacity and installed an AFC Boiler to reduce air pollution. Recognized again for its quality assurance and environmental management, PMG received its ISO 9001:2000 Certificate in 2003. PMG is one of the first consumer manufacturing companies to receive an ISO certification in Myanmar.

In 2007, it was reported by The Irrawaddy that it was among many other major private companies at the time like Max Myanmar and International Beverages Trading would be targeted by the Burmese government for tax evasion. However, none of the companies were found to be guilty. PMG Group, along with Myanmar Brewery Ltd and International Beverages Trading Co., Ltd and Pe were three of the major advertisers of alcohol, until a ban on such advertisements in print and broadcast media was instituted by the Burmese government in 2010.

== Criticism ==
PMG was allegedly founded by Yang Mao-liang, a Kokang warlord and head of a rebel group, the Myanmar National Democratic Alliance Army (MNDAA) and helped launder black money for the MNDAA. The allegations first appeared in 1998 in an Asia Week article titled “Business Is Blooming”. In 2020, the company issued a statement to deny these allegations which resurfaced long after the 1998 article was published.

According to the statement, PMG stated that “at no level in the business does PMG have any commercial, familial, personal, professional, physical or any other ties with this individual or the MNDAA”. The statement goes on to say that PMG was founded by U Tun Linn, U Thein Win and U Min Aung in 1993 on June 24 as seen in the certificate of incorporation and shareholder documents using money from existing legitimate businesses.

== Corporate social responsibility ==
PMG has supported the communities of the country, conducting several corporate social responsibility programs under its “Nyein Chan Myanmar” (Peace Myanmar) initiative since 2014. Regular blood employee donation events, contributions towards disabilities and autism associations, natural disaster affected peoples and other activates are conducted. When the global pandemic COVID-19 struck Myanmar, PMG supported the country’s government in an effort to protect its vulnerable population. The company donated thousands of bottled waters to quarantine centers and helped others to make their donations convenient, managing the transportation and donation with PMG staff.

== Awards ==
PMG was recognized by the Myanmar government as 5th Highest Commercial tax payer for the 2011-2012 Fiscal Year, 73rd Commercial tax payer for the 2014-2015 Fiscal Year, 322nd Income tax payer for the 2014-2015 Fiscal Year and 12th Special Goods taxpayer for the 2017-2018 Fiscal Year.

=== Other awards ===
The company also received prestigious domestic and international awards including a Gold medal in Best Career Advancement program, Bronze medal in Best Use of Internal Marketing for Company pride and Finalist for Overall Best of the Best.

=== Quality awards ===
In recognition of its products’ quality, PMG also clinched the Grand Gold medal in Monde Selection, Three Stars award for iTQi Superior Taste, Best of Class Platinum award for SIP, Silver medal in San Francisco World Spirit Award and Bronze medal in London Spirit Competition.
