= Konkyan Township =

Konkyan Township ကုန်းကြမ်းမြို့နယ်
- Township
- Location in Laukkaing district (Kokang SAZ)

- Location in Myanmar
- Coordinates: 23°49′00″N 98°32′00″E
- Country: Myanmar
- State: Shan State
- Self-administered zone: Kokang

Area
  - Total: 414.33 sq mi (1,073.11 km^{2})
- Elevation: 5,189 ft (1,582 m)
- Highest elevation: 8,317 ft (2,535 m)

Population (2019)
  - Total: 44,898
  - Density: 108.36/sq mi (41.839/km^{2})
  - Ethnicities: Kokang; Palaung
- Time zone: UTC+6.30 (MMT)

Konkyan Township or Kongyan Township (Burmese: ကုန်းကြမ်းမြို့နယ်, Chinese: 拱掌区) is a township located within Laukkaing District, Shan State, Myanmar (Burma). It is one of two townships of the Kokang Self-Administered Zone. The principal town is Konkyan. The township is divided into 141 villages organized into 8 village tracts and 2 towns, each with 3 urban wards. Besides Konkyan, the other town is Mawhtike in the northeast of the township.

== Geography ==
It is sharing a border with Laukkaing Township. It is situated at 5,226 feet (1,593 m) above sea level. The remaining area is mainly mountainous with its highest point at 8,317 feet (2,535 m) above sea level.

Rubber, lychee, mango, walnut, and pear are grown in this area as poppy substitutes. Sugarcane, pineapple, corn, buckwheat, soybean, and various vegetables are also grown.
