= Kokang =

Historically Chinese-populated region in northeastern Myanmar

Coordinates: 23°42′N 98°45′E

Kokang ကိုးကန့် / 果敢
- Historical region
- Location of Kokang in Shan State and Myanmar
- Highest point: 2,548 m

Area
  - Total: 1,895 km^{2} (732 sq mi)
- Elevation: 1,000 m (3,300 ft)

Population (2009)
  - Total: 150,000
  - Density: 79/km^{2} (210/sq mi)

Special Region 1 of the Union of Myanmar: ပြည်ထောင်စုမြန်မာနိုင်ငံအထူးဒေသ(၁) (Burmese); 缅甸联邦第一特区 (Chinese); Kokang
- Former Special region
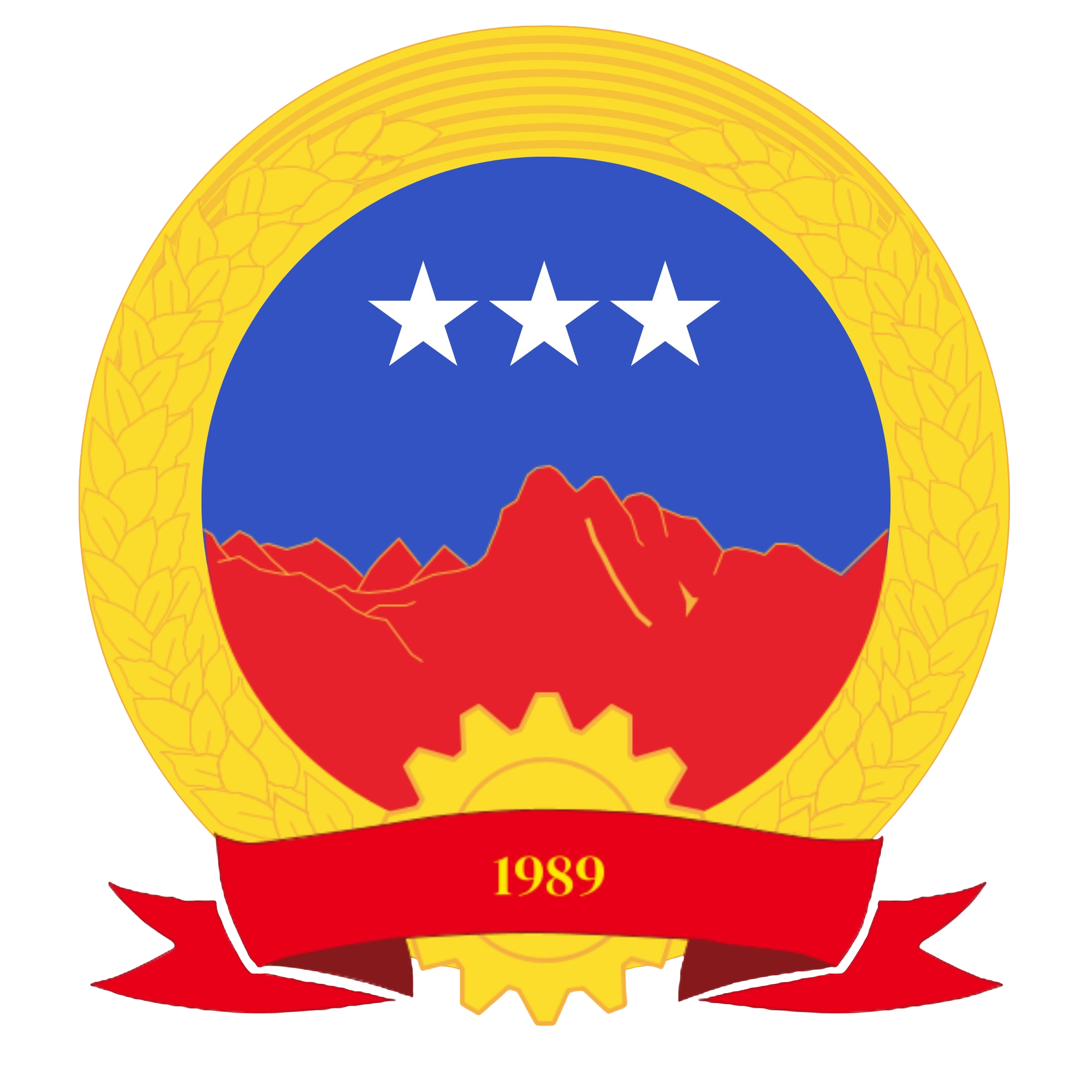
- Flag Emblem
- Anthem: 共赴荣昌 (Chinese) "Achieving prosperity together"
- Interactive map of Special Region 1 of the Union of Myanmar
- Country: Myanmar
- State: Shan State
- Formation of the SR1–SS: 3 January 1990
- MNDAA lost power; Replaced by the Kokang Region Provisional Leading Committee: 30 August 2009
- Capital: Laukkai
- Official languages: Burmese; Chinese

Government
  - Chairman: Pheung Kya-shin; Bai Suocheng

Area
  - Total: 10,000 km^{2} (3,900 sq mi)
- Highest elevation: 2,548 m (8,360 ft)

Population
  - 2009 estimate: 150,000
- Currency: Renminbi
- Time zone: UTC+6:30 (MMT)
- Driving side: right
- Calling code: +86 (0)883

Location of the Kokang region (green) within Shan State (yellow)

Kokang (Burmese: ကိုးကန့်; Chinese: 果敢; pinyin: Guǒgǎn; Wade–Giles: Kuo-kan) is a region in northern Myanmar, located in the northern part of Shan State with the Salween River to its west and a border with China's Yunnan Province to the east. Its total land area is around 1,895 square kilometers (732 sq mi), and its capital is Laukkai. Kokang is mostly populated by the Kokang people, an ethnic Han Chinese group with a centuries-long history of settlement in the area.

Although it lies within Myanmar, Kokang has close historical, linguistic and economic ties to China, and the surrounding territory was for several centuries a tributary chiefdom under varying degrees of Chinese suzerainty. After the British conquest of Upper Burma in 1885, Kokang was initially placed on the Chinese side of the border under the 1894 Sino-British boundary convention, before being formally ceded to British Burma in a supplementary agreement signed in February 1897.

From the 1960s until 1989, the area was controlled by the Communist Party of Burma. Following the collapse of the party's armed wing in 1989, Kokang became a special region of Myanmar under the control of the Myanmar National Democratic Alliance Army (MNDAA). Recurring armed conflict between the MNDAA and the Myanmar military, the Tatmadaw, has produced the 2009 Kokang incident, the 2015 Kokang offensive, and the 2023–2024 capture of Laukkai during Operation 1027. The MNDAA refers to the territory it controls as the "People's Government of Kokang".

== Etymology ==
The origin of the name Kokang is disputed. One account derives it from the Chinese term Guǒgǎn (果敢), said to have been adopted by the ruling Yang chiefdom. Other accounts trace the name instead to the Shan (Tai) language predating Chinese settlement of the area, with one definition rendering it as "head of nine villages" and another as "nine guardians." Before the migration of the Yang clan into the area, the region was inhabited mainly by Malipa mule traders along with a small Shan, Wa, and Jingpho (Kachin) population.

== Geography ==
Kokang occupies a narrow, rugged strip of territory in the far northern part of Shan State, wedged between the Salween (Thanlwin) River to the west and the Chinese border to the north and east. Researchers studying the region have described it as a thin sliver of high mountains and steep valleys squeezed between the river and the frontier, a landscape that historically left it remote and difficult to access from the rest of Myanmar. Its total land area is around 1,895 square kilometers (732 sq mi), and its capital is Laukkai.

The terrain forms part of the broader Shan Hills upland system, characterised by fault-block mountains, limestone ridges and steep river gorges, with elevations across the wider system generally running from around 900 to 1,200 metres above sea level. Few plains exist anywhere in Kokang; most settlements, including Laukkai itself, sit in narrow valleys hemmed in by steep slopes.

The Salween cuts through this upland in a series of deep, narrow gorges as it flows south from the Tibetan Plateau toward the Andaman Sea, with the surrounding Shan Hills area receiving annual precipitation of roughly 1,200 to 2,000 millimeters (47 to 79 in). Kokang's remoteness and rugged terrain have historically tied it more closely to Yunnan across the border than to lowland Myanmar.

The combination of high elevation, steep slopes and limited flat land has long shaped what can be grown in Kokang. Rice cultivation is difficult given the terrain and water scarcity, and the region has historically depended on cash crops, with the opium poppy dominating agriculture for much of the twentieth century before a government-mandated ban took effect in 2003.

=== Geology ===
Kokang and Shan State sit on the Sibumasu Block, a geological microcontinent that stretches across Southeast Asia from Tibet to Peninsular Thailand. The region is predominantly composed of sedimentary rock dating to the Paleozoic era.

== Demographics ==
In 2009, the population was reported to be around 150,000. Of these, around 100,000 held Burmese nationality, with the remainder originating from China. Of the Burmese-nationality population, 90 percent are ethnic Kokang people, a Han Chinese group of Yunnanese descent. Mandarin Chinese is widely spoken alongside Burmese, and the region largely operates on Chinese Standard Time and uses the renminbi as a parallel currency.

== Economy ==
Kokang's mountainous terrain and limited water supply have historically made rice cultivation difficult, leaving the population reliant on cash crops, chiefly tea and opium. While tea had to be transported to markets in Hsenwi and Lashio, opium could be sold locally, and by the 1950s, as fighting spread through Shan State, it became the region's dominant cash crop; Kokang-grown opium, prized for its high morphine content, became a major component of regional opium and heroin production through the latter half of the 20th century. A government-mandated ban on opium poppy cultivation came into effect in 2003. In subsequent decades, parts of the region's economy shifted toward cross-border trade, casinos catering to Chinese gamblers, and, by the 2010s and 2020s, large-scale online scam operations linked to human trafficking and organised crime.

== History ==
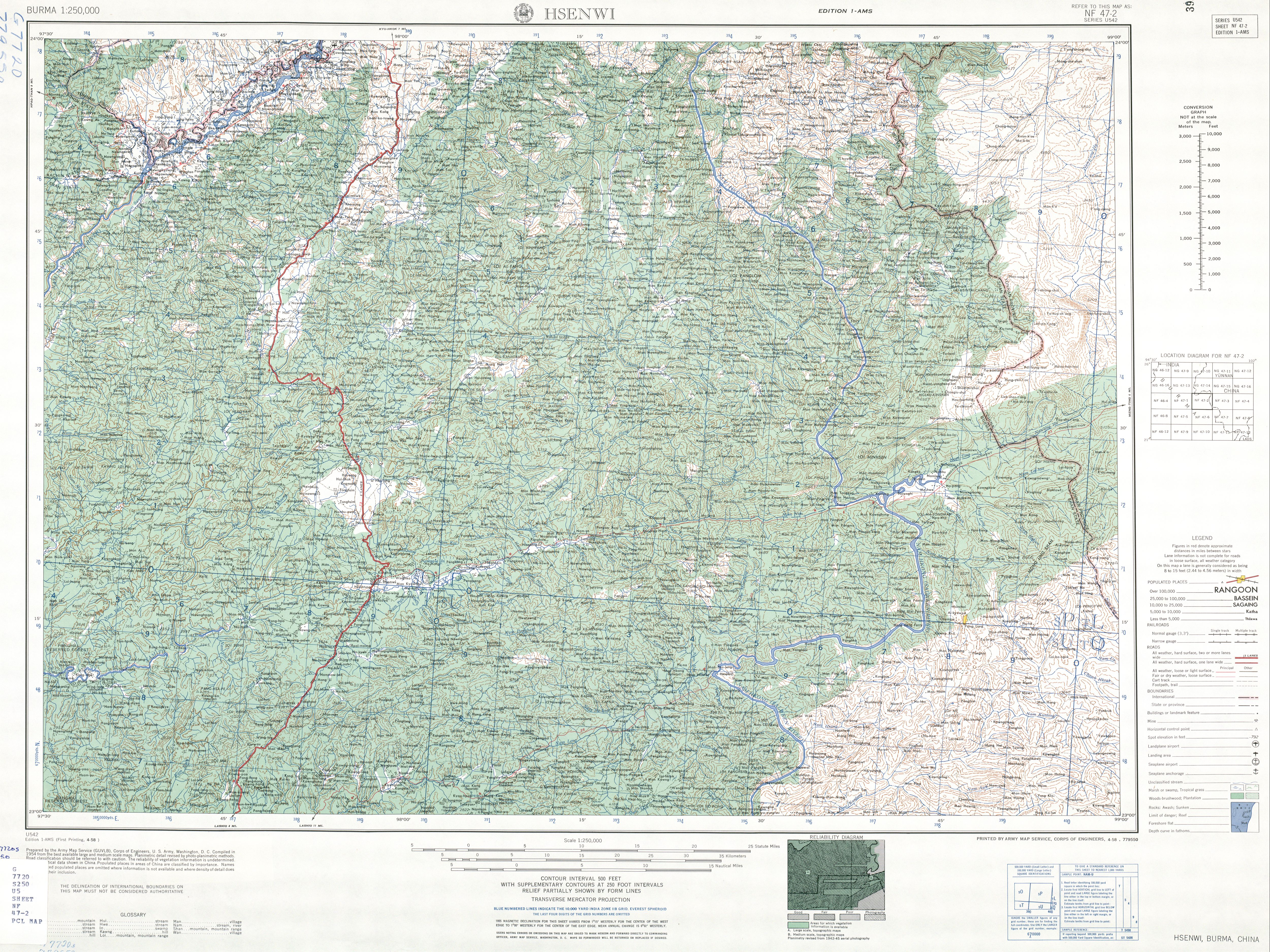
Map including part of the Kokang area (1954)

=== Chiefdom of Kokang, 1739–1897 ===
Yang Xiancai (simplified Chinese: 杨献才; traditional Chinese: 楊獻才; pinyin: Yáng Xiàncái), a descendant of Ming-dynasty loyalists who had earlier fled into the borderlands, founded a chiefdom known as Xingdahu (simplified Chinese: 兴达户; traditional Chinese: 興達戶; pinyin: Xīng Dáhù) in and around Ta Shwe Htan in 1739. His successors renamed the polity Kokang, and in 1840 the governor of Yunnan formally recognised the hereditary rights of the Yang chiefs as rulers of Kokang, a status the family held for roughly 250 years. After the British conquest of Upper Burma in 1885, Kokang was initially placed on the Chinese side of the border under the 1894 Sino-British boundary convention, before being ceded to British Burma under a supplementary agreement signed in February 1897.

=== British Burma, 1897–1948 ===
Under British rule, Kokang formed a de facto buffer zone between the Chinese province of Yunnan and the Shan States of British Burma. Its remoteness allowed the Yang chiefs considerable autonomy under nominal British oversight, and in August 1947, shortly before Burmese independence, Kokang was formally recognised as administratively separate from the rest of Shan State, with its ruler holding the title of Saopha.

=== Independence, civil conflict and Communist control, 1948–1989 ===
Following Burmese independence in 1948, the Saopha system was gradually dismantled, and the Yang family's hereditary authority eroded as Myanmar's central government extended its administration into the Shan States. The last hereditary ruler, Sao Edward Yang Kyein Tsai, was deposed by the Burmese government in 1959. Ne Win's 1962 coup further destabilised the region, prompting armed resistance from rival Kokang factions, including forces loyal to the Yang family and a separate force under Lo Hsing Han, even as northern Burma fell increasingly under the influence of Kuomintang remnants who had fled the Chinese Civil War. Beginning in 1968, Communist forces led by Peng Jiasheng, operating as a unit of the Communist Party of Burma (CPB) with backing from China, took control of the region from the Kuomintang-aligned factions, and the CPB administered Kokang until the collapse of its armed wing in 1989.

=== Myanmar National Democratic Alliance Army, 1989–2009 ===
In 1989, following the CPB's disintegration, Peng Jiasheng's forces reorganised as the Myanmar National Democratic Alliance Army (MNDAA) and took formal control of the region. A ceasefire between the MNDAA and the Tatmadaw was signed the same year, under which the MNDAA-controlled area was recognised as the autonomous "First Special Region" of Shan State (Chinese: 缅甸掸邦第一特区; Burmese: မြန်မာနိုင်ငံ ရှမ်းပြည်နယ်အထူးဒေသ (၁)).

In 2003, a ban on opium poppy cultivation came into effect across the special region.

Myanmar's 2008 constitution redefined Kokang as a self-administered zone. Kongyan Township and Laukkai Township, also known as Laukkaing Township, were grouped together to form the Kokang Self-Administered Zone, replacing the "First Special Region" designation.

In 2009, the Tatmadaw demanded that the MNDAA reorganise as a Border Guard Force under army direction. The MNDAA refused, and the Myanmar military ousted the group from power and assumed control of the region.

==== 2009 Kokang conflict ====
In August 2009, Kokang was the site of a violent confrontation, the 2009 Kokang incident, between Tatmadaw-aligned forces and the MNDAA. The conflict ended in the MNDAA's loss of control over the area, with as many as 30,000 refugees fleeing across the border into Yunnan province, China.

==== 2015 Kokang offensive ====
On 17 February 2015, Myanmar president Thein Sein declared a state of emergency and a three-month period of martial law in Kokang in response to renewed fighting between government forces and the MNDAA.

==== 2023–2024 Kokang conflict ====
In November 2023, the MNDAA began encircling and attacking Laukkai as part of Operation 1027, a coordinated offensive by the Three Brotherhood Alliance during the renewed civil war following the 2021 Myanmar coup d'état. The MNDAA encircled and captured Laukkai, the capital of the Kokang Self-Administered Zone, securing key victories in Chinshwehaw and other strategic border towns; the Tatmadaw's forces and allied Border Guard Forces surrendered in Laukkai by 26 December 2023, with the MNDAA securing full control of the city two days later.

=== 2025 – Present ===
In September 2025, China sentenced 16 members of the Ming family, a transnational crime syndicate based in Kokang and formerly headed by Ming Xuechang, to death. The syndicate had operated multiple scam factories staffed by trafficked workers held in prison-like compounds, alongside online gambling, drug trafficking and organised prostitution operations.

== Rulers of Kokang ==
Chiefs of Kokang

- See Chiefdom of Kokang#Rulers

De facto rulers

- Olive Yang Kyin Hsiu 杨金秀: 1960–1963
- Jimmy Yang Kyein Sein 杨振声: 1963–1965 (commander of the Kokang Revolutionary Force)
- Lo Hsing Han 罗星汉: 1965–March 1969 (commander of Kokang Ka Kwe Ye)
- Pheung Kya-shin aka Peng Jiasheng: March 1969–3 January 1990 (governor of Kokang County)

Chairmen of the Shan State First Special Region

- Pheung Kya-shin aka Peng Jiasheng 彭家声: 3 January 1990 – 27 February 1993
- Yang Mao-liang 杨茂良: 27 February 1993 – 1 January 1996 (Political Officer)
- Pheung Kya-shin: 1 January 1996 – 25 August 2009 (in exile: 26 August 2009 – 16 February 2022)
- Bai Xuoqian 白所成: 25 August 2009 – 30 March 2011 (chairman of the Interim Management Committee)
- Pheung Daxun aka Peng Deren 彭德仁: 5 January 2024–present (in exile: 16 February 2022 – 5 January 2024)

Chairmen of the Kokang Self-Administered Zone

- Bai Xuoqian: 30 March 2011 – 5 April 2016
- Zhao Dechen 赵德强: 5 April 2016 – 19 February 2021
- Li Zhanfu 李正福 aka U Myint Swe ဦးမြင့်ဆွေ: 19 February 2021 – 9 November 2023
- Brigadier General Tun Tun Myint ထွန်းထွန်းမြင့်: 9 November 2023 – 5 January 2024 (acting)

== See also ==
- Burmese Chinese
- Wa State
