= Kokang people =

Mandarin-speaking ethnic group native to Myanmar

Kokang
果敢族 / ကိုးကန့်လူမျိုး

Regions with significant populations
- Kokang

Languages
- Southwestern Mandarin, Burmese, Standard Chinese

Religion
- Theravada Buddhism

Related ethnic groups
- Burmese Chinese, Overseas Chinese, Chin Haw

Map of the Kokang region (in green) in Shan State (in yellow).

The Kokang people (Chinese: 果敢族; pinyin: Guǒgǎn zú; Burmese: ကိုးကန့်လူမျိုး) are a Han Chinese sub-ethnic group native to Kokang in Myanmar, who speak Southwestern Mandarin, also referred to locally as the Kokang language. The Kokang people belong to the Sino-Tibetan family and are an officially recognized ethnic group of the Republic of the Union of Myanmar.

== Etymology ==
The name Kokang derives from the Burmese ကိုးကန့်, which itself derives from the Shan ၵဝ်ႈ (kāo, "nine") + ၵူၼ်း (kúun, "family") or ၵၢင် (kǎang, "guard").

== Distribution ==
In 1997, it was estimated that the Kokang Chinese, together with more recently immigrated Han Chinese from Yunnan, China, constituted 30 to 40 percent of Myanmar's ethnic Chinese population. They constitute around 0.1% of Myanmar's population.

== History ==
Most Kokang are descendants of Chinese speakers who migrated to what is now Shan State, Myanmar in the 18th century. In the mid-17th century, the Yang clan formed a feudal state called Kokang in the Shan States. From the 1960s to 1989, the area was ruled by the Communist Party of Burma, and after the dissolution of that party in 1989 it became a special region of Myanmar.

The Myanmar National Democratic Alliance Army (MNDAA) is a Kokang insurgent group. In August 2009 they clashed with Tatmadaw soldiers in a conflict fanned by controversial interests known as the 2009 Kokang incident, followed by further skirmishes during the 2015 Kokang offensive.

== Notable Kokang people ==
- Sao Edward Yang Kyein Tsai: King of Kokang
- Lo Hsing Han
- Olive Yang
- Pheung Kya-shin

== See also ==
- Chinese people in Myanmar
- Kokang Self-Administered Zone
