= 2009 Kokang incident =

Ethnic conflict in Myanmar

Kokang incident
- Part of the Myanmar conflict
- Location of the Kokang region (green) within Shan State (yellow)
| Date | 27–30 August 2009 |
| Location | Kokang, Myanmar 23°41′42″N 98°45′51″E |
| Result | Burmese government victory |

Belligerents
| Myanmar National Democratic Alliance Army; National Democratic Alliance Army; United Wa State Army | Union of Myanmar; MNDAA mutineers |

Commanders and leaders
| Pheung Kya-shin; Pheung Kya-fu; Pheung Daxun | Min Aung Hlaing; Bai Xuoqian; Wei Chaoren; Liu Guoxi; Ming Xuechang |

Casualties and losses
| Per junta government: 8 killed 640 weapons seized | Per junta government: 26 killed 47 wounded Per MNDAA and allies: 30+ killed |
- 1 Chinese citizen killed 30,000 displaced

The Kokang incident was a violent series of skirmishes that broke out in August 2009 in Kokang in Myanmar's northern Shan State. Several clashes between ethnic minorities and the Burmese military junta forces (including the Myanmar Armed Forces, also known as Tatmadaw, and the Myanmar Police Force) took place. As a result of the conflict, the MNDAA lost control of the area and as many as 30,000 refugees fled to Yunnan in neighbouring China.

== Background ==
The civil war in Burma (later Myanmar) began when the first shots were fired by the Communist Party of Burma (CPB) in April 1948 in the small village of Paukkongyi in the Pegu District (present-day Bago Region). Since the late 1960s Kokang was under control by some warlords, the first of them were the Communists and later the Kokang nationalists. In March 1989 a group made by Phone Kyar Shin was formed as a splinter group from the CPB called the Myanmar National Democratic Alliance Army (MNDAA). The rebels in Kokang made soon after a ceasefire with the Burmese military government; they also were the first armed ethnic group to do so. That same year was the CPB dissolved after a peace agreement was made between them and the government.

Other groups like the National Democratic Alliance Army (NDAA) and the United Wa State Army (UWSA) were also formed in 1989. Like the MNDAA they are splinter groups from the CPB and after their splits, they also made ceasefires with the Burmese government. This would be followed by many rebels in the states Kachin, Kayah, Mon and Shan made partial ceasefire agreements in the 1990s. During the truce agreement, the MNDAA was allowed to control their checkpoints and collect taxes from the people. In return the Tatmadaw was allowed to travel freely within the just established Shan State Special Region 1 (SR1). The MNDAA had in 2007 between 3,000 and 4,000 men.

When the 2008 constitution was signed as part of the truce agreement, Kokang became one of the five self-administered zones within Myanmar. Since then, the military junta has proposed that the ethnic armies be assimilated into the Tatmadaw and converted into the Border Guard Forces (BGF); almost all of the ethnic armies have opposed this plan, with exceptions of the Democratic Karen Buddhist Army and the New Democratic Army - Kachin (NDA-K) who joined the BGF. Observers and activists claim that the junta's motivation for this proposal is to disarm and neutralise the ethnic groups before the Myanmar general election scheduled to take place sometime in 2010.

== Prelude ==
Kokang has been ruled since 1989 by the leader of the MNDAA, Peng Jiasheng (also known as Pheung Kya-shin, Its population was in 2005–2006 about} 70 per cent Chinese Kokang, 12 per cent Paulang, 3 percent of each the Miao and Lisu and 2 per cent Wa. Until 2003, the MNDAA produced opium but they stopped producing it under Chinese and Burmese pressure. Two years later the Burmese government declared that poppy growing in the Shan State would be illegal. But even after that, there are claims that Kokang is still a center of illegal drug trading.

Tensions came to a head on 8 August 2009 when the junta military, acting on a tip-off from China, moved into the region for a raid on a gun factory suspected of being a drug front and on Kokang leader Pheung's home. This confrontation, according to the newspaper Shan Herald, was only a "stand-off", with no shots being fired; nevertheless, it triggered a mass exodus of locals who were worried about the possibility of violence. and a resident of the Kokang regional capital Laukkai later described the city as a "ghost town". Chinese officials had to intervene in the face-off, and by 17 August officials claimed that the situation in Kokang was "normal" again.

The MNDAA reportedly has about 1,000 to 1,500 soldiers. Recently there has been an inter-faction split within the army, with Pheung being opposed by deputy chairman Bai Xuoqian—while Pheung has opposed efforts to integrate the Kokang army with the Tatmadaw, Bai has supported it and gained the junta's backing. According to the newspaper Shan Herald, several factions of the Kokang army have become loyal to the junta, and three high-ranking army officials informed the junta government that Pheung was secretly producing illicit weapons and drugs.

=== Violence ===
Location of Laukkai, regional capital of Kokang

By 20 August, however, government troops were beginning to gather near Laukkai, and Kokang leaders reportedly urged residents to "be prepared", which prompted even more people to flee. On 24 August, junta troops captured and occupied Laukkai "without firing a shot". The anti-junta Kachin News claimed that the takeover was aided by a "mutiny" staged by Kokang army leaders who had become loyal to the junta.

On 27 August, the Myanmar National Democratic Alliance Army began to open fire on junta troops outside the city; according to a government statement, the Kokang army raided a police checkpoint near the border. Later Wa, Kachin, and as many as nine other ethnic groups joined in the fighting; the United Wa State Army, Myanmar's largest ethnic military force, was also involved in the fighting, as was the National Democratic Alliance Army (also known as the Mong La Army). On 27 and 28 there were more battles in the villages of Yan Lon Kyaik and Chinshwehaw, near the Chinese border. Across the border, the Chinese army increased its numbers in attempt to maintain border stability.

By late 29 August, the United States-based Campaign for Burma claimed that as many as 700 Kokang fighters, outnumbered by junta troops, had fled, surrendered to the Chinese, and given up their weapons. Kokang soldiers interviewed in China after surrendering also said they had been overrun. While the Kokang army appears to have been routed, the larger United Wa State Army was still active, and Al Jazeera reported that the government was requesting reinforcements to deal with them; The New York Times, however, reported that the Wa army had withdrawn as early as 28 August. The government issued a statement on 30 August claiming that the fighting had ended, and later formed a new "Kokang Region Provisional Leading Committee" in Laukkai.

The Myanmar Army's operation in the incident was overseen by Min Aung Hlaing and he was credited for it by the junta.

== Casualties and refugees ==
No official casualty count was released in the first two days of fighting, although Pheung Kya-shin claimed that his forces had killed over thirty Tatmadaw troops. One Chinese person was killed during fighting when a bomb went over the border. On 30 August, the junta government released its first figures, claiming that the fighting had killed twenty-six junta troops (fifteen police, eleven soldiers) and wounded forty-seven (thirteen police, thirty-four soldiers), and that eight rebel bodies had been found; the figures have not been independently confirmed, however.

From 8 to 12 August, as many as 10,000 residents fled to Yunnan in neighbouring China, becoming refugees. The total number of refugees fleeing in the entire month may be as high as 30,000, according to the United Nations High Commissioner for Refugees and later the Yunnan provincial government. Yunnan's police chief later reported that the number of refugees in Yunnan reached 37,000, including Burmese refugees as well as Kokang. Yunnan government officials stated they have established seven locations (particularly near the city of Nansan, where most of the refugees arrived) to house and treat the refugees; some locals, however, claimed that not all the refugees were being housed, or were being housed in unfinished buildings and tents. According to one refugee, about 13,000 of the refugees were housed in the tents, and 10,000–20,000 more stayed with friends or family in the area. By 31 August, some refugees (as many as 4,000, according to local officials, or 2,800 according to the junta government) had started returning to Kokang; by mid-September, Chinese officials said over 9,000 refugees had returned and Myanmar officials said over 13,000; many refugees, however, were still afraid to go back.

Pheung was also rumoured to have fled Kokang, and is currently in China, although his precise location has not been revealed. Before the Kokang forces surrendered, he claimed that he was still controlling them from abroad.

== Reaction ==
Although China has in the past supported the military junta, during the conflict, it had instead warned Myanmar to end the situation, saying they should "properly handle domestic problems and maintain stability in the China-Myanmar border region" and urging Burma to protect "Chinese citizens in Myanmar". Chinese officials were said to be "furious" and "extremely upset" over not being forewarned about the offensive on the border. Chinese and other analysts expressed concern that this conflict could lead to a civil war in Burma. The Burmese Foreign Ministry later apologised to China about the incident, but also ran a story on the Dalai Lama in the government newspaper the Myanmar Times, the first mention of him in the state controlled Burmese media for 20 years.

The UN has also expressed concern about reports of fighting and thousands of refugees fleeing across the border. The American government also voiced its concern, and called on the junta to end its military campaign against the cease-fire groups.

== Aftermath ==
After the fighting ended, the new Kokang leader claimed that the Kokang people would participate in the 2010 general elections; other cease-fire groups such as the Wa and Kachin still maintain that they will not participate.

Bai, vice-president under Peng Jiasheng, became the new head of Kokang with the support of ruling junta in 2009. The portion of the MNDAA loyal to him became Border Guard Force #1006. He is also head of Kokang Self Administered Zone and a member of Myanmar parliament in 2011. The area was peaceful until new clashes between Peng Jiasheng's troops and Myanmar troops erupted in February 2015.

Major General Huang Xing, the former head of the research guidance department at the Chinese Academy of Military Science, was ousted in 2015 because of his relationship with MNDAA during this incident.

== See also ==
- 2015 Kokang offensive
- China–Myanmar relations
- Internal conflict in Myanmar

== Bibliography ==
- Egreteau, Renaud; Jagan, Larry (2013). Soldiers and Diplomacy in Burma: Understanding the Foreign Relations of the Burmese Praetorian State. Singapore: NUS Press. ISBN 978-9971-696-73-3.
- Lintner, Bertil (2019). Burma in Revolt: Opium and Insurgency since 1948. Abingdon, England: Routledge. ISBN 978-0429-720-59-8.
- South, Ashley (2008). Ethnic Politics in Burma: States of Conflict. Abingdon, England: Routledge. ISBN 978-1134-129-53-9.
- The Daily Herald (10 September 2009). "The Daily Herald, Thursday, September 10, 2009" (PDF). The Daily Herald. Vol. 19, no. 99. Philipsburg, Sint Maarten.
- UNODC (2018). "Myanmar Opium Survey 2018 Cultivation, Production and Implications" (PDF). United Nation Office on Drugs and Crime.
