= Chinshwehaw =

Chinshwehaw ချင်းရွှေဟော်မြို့ 清水河
- Town
- Location in Myanmar
- Coordinates: 23°28′32″N 98°49′27″E
- Country: Myanmar
- State: Shan State
- Self-administered zone: Kokang
- Township: Laukkaing Township

Population (2014)
  - Town: 4,889
  - Urban: 3,138
  - Rural: 2,752
- Time zone: UTC+6.30 (MST)

Chinshwehaw (Burmese: ချင်းရွှေဟော်မြို့) (Chinese: 清水河; pinyin: Qīngshuǐhé) is a town in Laukkaing Township, Kokang Self-Administered Zone in northeastern Shan State of Myanmar. The town borders Qingshuihe Village of the Gengma Dai and Va Autonomous County, Yunnan Province, China. The town is home to one of 5 official border trade posts with China, and opened on 19 October 2003. In 2022, total trade volume at the border post stood at US$283.396 million.

On 28 October 2023 it was reported that the town had come fully under control of the Myanmar National Democratic Alliance Army (MNDAA) during the ongoing civil war.
