= Chinese People's Police Day =

- Observed by: China
- Significance: Day to commemorate the people's police
- Date: 10 January
- Next time: 10 January 2026
- Frequency: Annual
- First time: 10 January 2021

The Chinese People's Police Day is a holiday for the People's Police of China. It is celebrated on January 10 each year.

== History ==
On July 11, 2020, after the application of the Ministry of Public Security, the approval of the Central Committee of the Chinese Communist Party, and a reply from the State Council, the China decided to establish January 10 of each year from 2021 as Chinese People's Police Day to commend the "selfless contributions made by police officers at all levels in mainland China to maintaining social order". The festival was also established to commemorate the 35th anniversary of the official opening of the Guangzhou 110 emergency call center in 1986, the first in the country. This date also played a certain role in promoting public awareness of the police hotline "110".
