= Shan Herald News Agency =

Shan Herald Agency for News (SHAN) is a media organization covering Myanmar, with a particular focus on Shan State. It was established in Shan State in 1991 and moved its operations to Chiang Mai, Thailand, in 1996. SHAN developed as part of the ethnic and exile media sector that emerged around Myanmar's borders during the 1990s. "The Role of Ethnic Media in the "New Myanmar"" (PDF). Regional Center for Social Science and Sustainable Development, Chiang Mai University."Shan Herald Agency for News (SHAN)". Drugs & (Dis)order, SOAS University of London.

== History ==
SHAN was established in Shan State in 1991. It emerged during a period when military rule and restrictions on the domestic press limited the availability of independent information about ethnic minority areas of Myanmar. During the 1990s, a number of ethnic and exile media organizations developed along the country's borders, including the Shan Herald Agency for News. Academic research on Myanmar's ethnic media identifies SHAN as one of the organizations established to collect and disseminate information about events in ethnic areas. "The Role of Ethnic Media in the "New Myanmar"" (PDF). Regional Center for Social Science and Sustainable Development, Chiang Mai University.

In 1996, SHAN moved to Chiang Mai, Thailand. The move was intended to provide greater independence from armed political factions operating in Shan State. Chiang Mai subsequently became an important base for Burmese and ethnic exile media organizations. "The Role of Ethnic Media in the "New Myanmar"" (PDF). Regional Center for Social Science and Sustainable Development, Chiang Mai University.

Research on Myanmar's media environment has described SHAN as an important example of ethnic media emerging from the country's armed and political conflicts. The organization reported on developments in Shan State and helped disseminate information to audiences inside Myanmar and abroad. McElhone, Jane Madlyn; Brooten, Lisa (2019). "Myanmar Media in Transition". Myanmar Media in Transition: Legacies, Challenges and Change. ISEAS Publishing.

== Reporting and publications ==
SHAN reports on political, social and economic developments in Shan State and other parts of Myanmar. Its coverage has included armed conflict, politics, human rights, environmental issues and the production and trafficking of drugs. The Drugs & (Dis)order research project at the School of Oriental and African Studies (SOAS) noted that SHAN had reported extensively on armed conflict, politics, the environment and drug-related issues in Shan State. "Shan Herald Agency for News (SHAN)". Drugs & (Dis)order, SOAS University of London.

SHAN has published news and commentary in several languages, including Shan, Burmese, English and Thai. Its publications have included the monthly journal Independence. In addition to its publications, the organization has operated online news and multimedia services. "Shan Herald Agency for News". Burma News International. 1 May 2023."Announcement: Young members taking over SHAN helm". Burma News International. 18 October 2013.

In 2013, Burma News International reported that SHAN's management had been transferred to a younger generation of staff, while co-founder Khuensai Jaiyen continued to serve as president in an advisory role. The organization was also operating an online radio programme at the time. "Announcement: Young members taking over SHAN helm". Burma News International. 18 October 2013.

== Role in ethnic media ==
SHAN has been identified in academic research as part of the development of ethnic media in Myanmar. These organizations emerged particularly during the 1990s, when journalists, activists and members of ethnic communities established media outlets to document events in areas affected by conflict and to provide information that was difficult to obtain through the state-controlled media. "The Role of Ethnic Media in the "New Myanmar"" (PDF). Regional Center for Social Science and Sustainable Development, Chiang Mai University.

A study of Myanmar's media history describes SHAN as having developed from the ethnic armed-struggle environment and notes that international media organizations used its reporting as a source. The study also describes the organization's role in the development of ethnic media capacity in Myanmar. McElhone, Jane Madlyn; Brooten, Lisa (2019). "Myanmar Media in Transition". Myanmar Media in Transition: Legacies, Challenges and Change. ISEAS Publishing.

SHAN is a member of Burma News International (BNI), a network of independent media organizations covering Myanmar and its ethnic states. BNI lists SHAN among its affiliated media organizations. "Shan Herald Agency for News". Burma News International.

== See also ==
- Media of Myanmar
- Shan State
- Burma News International
- The Irrawaddy
- Democratic Voice of Burma
