= Bai Suocheng =

Burmese politician

- 白所成
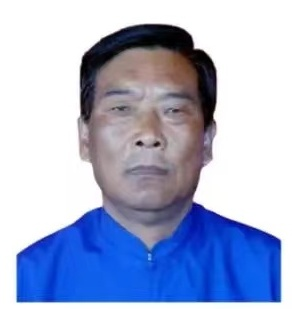
- Image of Bai taken from a 2023 wanted poster

Member of the Shan State Hluttaw
- In office 31 January 2011 – 29 January 2016
- Preceded by: Constituency established
- Succeeded by: Bai Yingneng
- Constituency: Laukkai Constituency No.2

Head of the Kokang Self-Administered Zone
- In office 30 March 2011 – 5 April 2016
- Preceded by: position created
- Succeeded by: Zhao Dechen

Chairman of the Shan State Special region 1 Interim Management Committee
- In office 25 August 2009 – 30 March 2011
- Deputy: Zhang Dewen, Li Zhongxiang, Yang Zhongwei (until 22 November 2009), Liu Gaoxi, Wei Chaoren (since 22 November 2009)
- Preceded by: Pheung Kya-shin (chairman of the region)
- Succeeded by: as the head of KSZ

Deputy Commander of the MNDAA
- In office 1 January 1996 – 25 August 2009 Serving with Wang Guozheng, Jiang Zhongming (until 2000), Zhang Dewen, Peng Deren (since 1997), Wei Chaoren (since 2000)
- Commander: Pheung Kya-fu
- In office February 1993 – 1 January 1996 Serving with Ai En, Wang Guozheng, Jiang Zhongming
- Commander: Yang Mao-liang

Personal details
- Born: 14 May 1950 Lyaae Shan Htaan Village, Hon Aik, Kokang, Burma
- Died: 11 November 2025 (aged 75) Shenzhen, Guangdong, China
- Party: USDP
- Other political affiliations: Communist (1967–1989); MNTJP (1989–2009)
- Children: 2 sons and 4 daughters (including Bai Yingneng (Khin Maung Lwin), Bai Yingcang (Khin Maung Win), Bai Yingxiang, Bai Yinglan)

Military service
- Allegiance: People's Army (1967–1989); MNDAA (1989–2009)
- Years of service: 1967–2009

Bai Suocheng (Chinese: 白所成; pinyin: Bái Suǒchéng; Burmese: ပယ်ဆောက်ချိန်, romanized: pai hcauk hkyin; 14 May 1950 – 11 November 2025) was a Burmese Kokang politician from Shan State. He was the deputy commander of the Myanmar Nationalities Democratic Alliance Army who later became the MP of the Shan State Hluttaw representing Laukkai and first leader of the Kokang Self-Administered Zone. In 2024, he was extradited to China for running online and telephone scam centres.

== Life and career ==
Bai was a deputy commander of the Myanmar Nationalities Democratic Alliance Army (MNDAA) who assisted Pheung Kya-shin in ousting Yang Mao-liang from the leadership in 1992. He later tried to replace Pheung himself with the support of Myanmar's government. Bai allied himself with the Tatmadaw (Myanmar Armed Forces) to oust Pheung during the three-day Kokang incident in 2009. Remnants of the MNDAA were reorganized into Border Guard Force #1006 under Bai's supervision afterwards.

He was elected as an MP of the Shan State Hluttaw representing Laukkai Constituency No. 2. during the 2010 general election. Bai's agreement led to the formation of the Kokang Self-Administered Zone on 20 August 2010 where Bai would become its the first head of the Kokang Self-Administered Zone.

Under his rule, the region became known for drugs and weapons trafficking. Bai was not very popular and survived an assassination attempt in March 2012. Bai's deputy, Liu Gaoxi, was elected in the same general election in 2010, and was known for his involvement with drugs trafficking. Bai Suocheng, his children and his associates dominated a multi-billion-dollar hotel and casino business empire, including online gambling operations. These businesses extend to Karen State and internationally to Sihanoukville, Cambodia. Chinese court records have heard multiple cases involving the Bai and Liu family's companies relating to gambling, smuggling, and kidnapping from Kokang hotels and casinos.

On 10 December 2023, China issued a warrant for him. He was later arrested by Burmese authorities, which transferred him along with other nine people, including his son Bai Yingcang, to China on 30 January 2024. On 11 July 2025, Bai was prosecuted by the Shenzhen People's Procuratorate.

From 19 to 22 September 2025, Bai was tried in the Shenzhen Intermediate People's Court. On 4 November 2025, the court sentenced Bai to death.

On 11 November 2025, BBC Burmese broadcasting reported that Bai was taken to hospital the day on 5 November 2025 and died before it could be carried out. Xinhua later confirmed that Bai died from illness before his execution.

== See also ==
- Four Families of Kokang
- Lo Hsing Han
