= Lào Cai =

Lào Cai may refer to:

- Lào Cai province, a province in northwestern Vietnam
- Lào Cai (city), former provincial city of Lào Cai province
