= Laukkai =

Laukkai လောက်ကိုင်မြို့ (Burmese) 老街 (Chinese) လဝ်ႉၵႆႇ၊ ဝဵင်း (Shan)
- Town
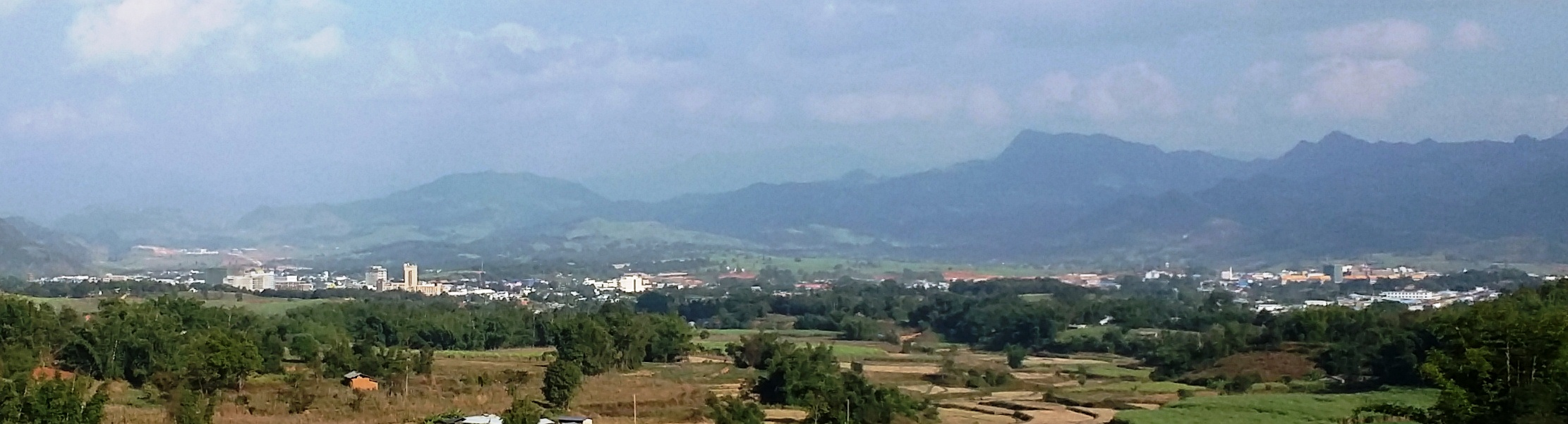
- Laukkai

- Location in Myanmar
- Coordinates: 23°41′41″N 98°45′52″E
- Country: Myanmar
- State: Shan State
- District: Kokang Self-Administered Zone
- Township: Laukkaing Township
- Elevation: 3,200 ft (980 m)

Population (2014)
  - Total: 23,435
  - Religions: Buddhism
- Time zone: UTC+6.30 (MST)

Laukkai (also known as Laukkaing, Laogai or Laokai; Burmese: လောက်ကိုင်မြို့; Chinese: 老街; pinyin: Lǎojiē) is the capital of Kokang Self-Administered Zone in the northern part of Shan State, Myanmar.

Laukkai has become notorious for its gambling, prostitution, human trafficking, and online scams.

== Geography ==
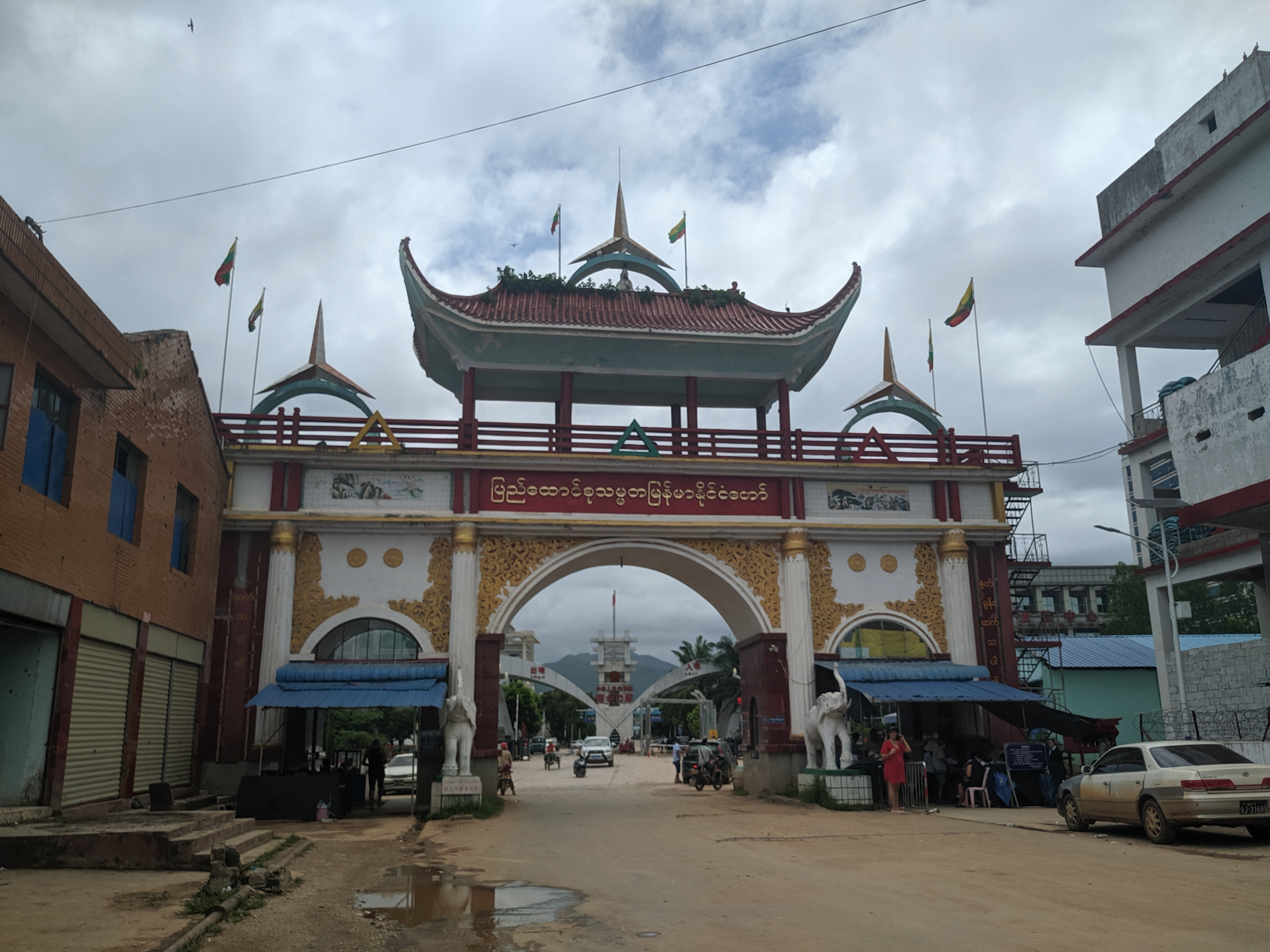
China-Myanmar border Yanlonkyine Gate, near Laukkaing

Laukkai is located in the northern part of Shan State, Myanmar, east of the Salween River, which forms part of the China-Myanmar border with the People's Republic of China at its upper reaches. It is about 10 miles (16 km) away from Nansan (Chinese characters: 南傘), China.

Its annual rainfall is over 40 inches (1,000 mm).

In Laukkai, Southwestern Mandarin and Chinese characters are widely used, and the Chinese renminbi is in circulation. It is the main town of Laukkaing Township of the Kokang Self-Administered Zone. It is 117 miles (188 km) from Lashio and 42 miles (68 km) from Kongyan. Its population is 23,435.

== History ==
Historically, a settlement called Tawnio or Malipa (麻栗壩) existed in the area. It was the principle bazaar of the Chiefdom of Kokang, and located in the only flat land of the state.

=== Modern history ===
It was a center of fighting in the August 2009 Kokang incident; on 24 August, it was occupied by troops of the Tatmadaw, Burma's military junta, led by General Min Aung Hlaing.

=== Under Myanmar government ===
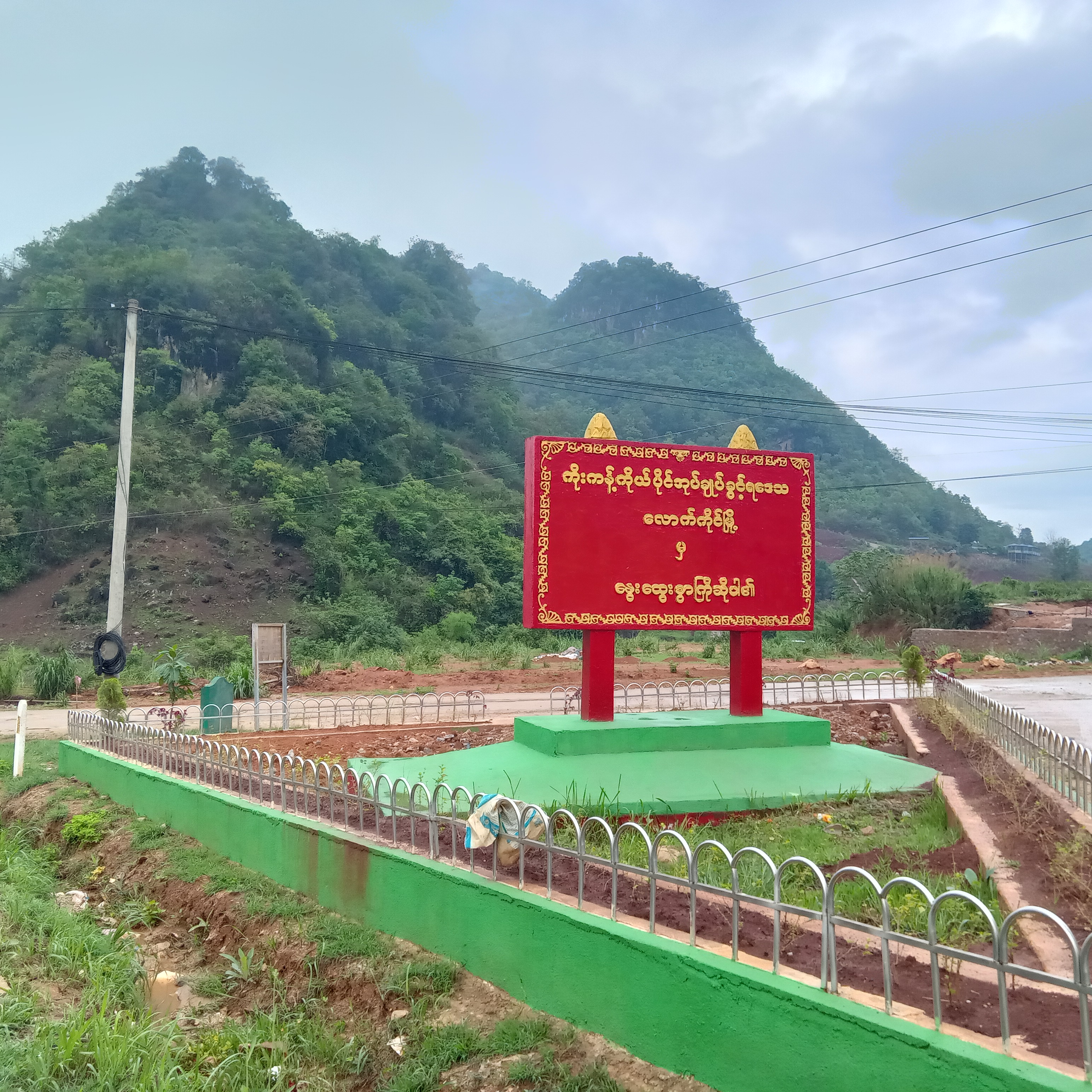
Laukkaing City Entrance Sign

Following the seizure of Laukkai from ethnic armies in 2009, the military installed a pro-junta militia. The militia subsequently grew rich off the production of drugs, and off gambling and prostitution to Chinese tourists. This gave rise to online scam compounds run by trafficked people mainly from China. The Strait Times reported in 2023 that around 40 scam compounds could be operating around Laukkai.

On 17 February 2015, Myanmar president Thein Sein declared a state of emergency three-month period of martial law in Kokang in response to fighting between government troops and the Myanmar National Democratic Alliance Army MNDAA), a rebel group. The curfew was extended on 9 September 2019.

On 6 March 2017, members of the Myanmar National Democratic Alliance Army (MNDAA) raided the Fully Light, Kyinfu, and Kyin Kyan casinos in Laukkai. The three casinos were owned by the rival Kokang Border Guard Force. The raid resulted in the death of one person, and the capture of tens of millions of dollars.

=== 1020 incident, 2023 ===
In the early hours of 20 October 2023, a rescue attempt for the hundreds of people forced to work at the Crouching Tiger villa of transnational crime syndicate leader Ming Xuechang went awry, with Chinese media reporting that multiple Chinese citizens were shot and killed by guards while attempting to escape the compound. This incident has since been credited with forcing China to allow anti-junta forces to begin Operation 1027. The Ming family operated the Crouching Tiger Villa, one of the most notorious scam factories. The Irrawaddy reported in 2025, that the Ming family worked for one of the four clans who ran Laukkai.

=== Operation 1027 ===
On 27 October 2023, the Three Brotherhood Alliance launched a new offensive against the Tatmadaw in northern Shan State. The offensive saw the MNDAA make gains in the Kokang, with the goal of recapturing Laukkai since its loss in 2009. On 11 and 12 November, the MNDAA started shelling Laukkai, and eventually ended up surrounding the city on 14 November. On 12 November, all 127 members of Light Infantry Battalion 129 surrendered to the MNDAA with their families near Laukkai in Konkyan.

Map showing the Battle of Laukkai (November 2023 - January 2024)

Due to Laukkai's position as a major area for online scams, the MNDAA said that it would hand over any captured scam bosses to China. The MNDAA also issued orders to its forces to protect foreigners, rescue kidnapped victims, and to protect Chinese businesses and the China-Myanmar pipeline project.

Since the MNDAA began closing in onto Laukkai, the city has seen a mass exodus. In late November 2023, the MNDAA opened a humanitarian corridor for migrant workers in Laukkai to flee to Lashio through Laukkaing and Kunlong townships, and Wa state. The corridor was however not used for ethnic Kokang people. Many Kokangs fled towards the Chinese border, but had tear gas fired on them by the Chinese authorities.

On 6 December, the MNDAA captured the strategic Four Buddhist Statues Hill after three days of fighting against the Tatmadaw. The pagoda is located on a hill overlooking Laukkai and was the junta's last outpost before Laukkai.

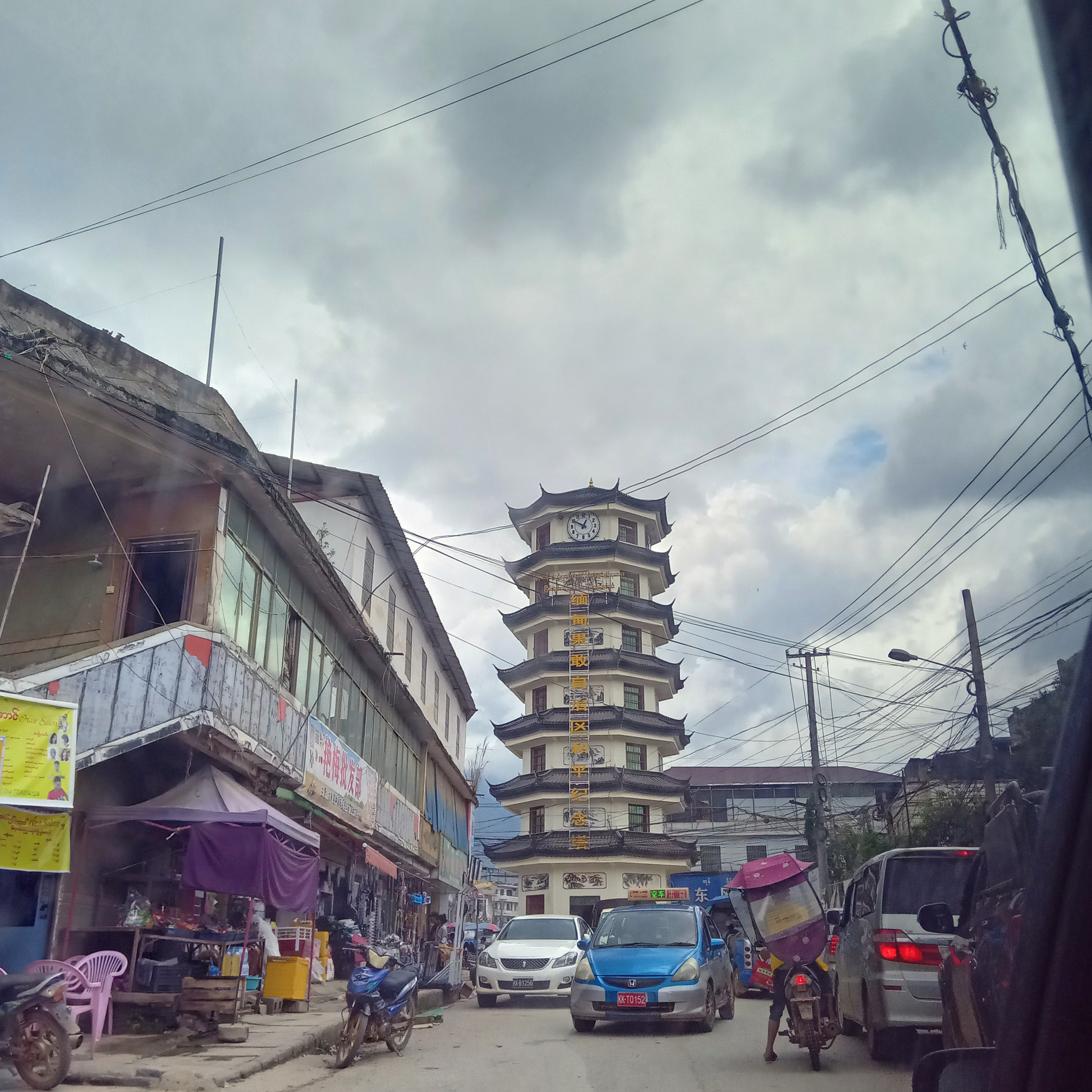
Laukkaing Peace Memorial Tower

On 15 December 2023, China mediated a temporary ceasefire between the Tatmadaw and the MNDAA in Kunming. China also issued arrest warrants for key members of the main families in Laukkai on 10 December, alleging that they were the ringleaders of telecom and online scams. This included the region's former chairman, Bai Suocheng. The ceasefire ended on 18 December after the junta launched airstrikes on a base controlled by the MNDAA. Following this, the MNDAA captured the Yanlonkyaing border gate on the Chinese border north of Laukkai on 19 December.

On 28 December 2023 it was reported that "most" of Laukkai was now under MNDAA control, with junta forces largely abandoning the city. The MNDAA gained full control of Laukkai following a mass surrender of the last junta forces in the city on 5 January 2024.

=== Myanmar National Democratic Alliance Army (MNDAA) Control ===
On 24 April 2024, ten men ranging in age from 19 to 38 were convicted in three separate cases. The charges ranged from selling stolen weapons to SAC forces and extortion to human trafficking and murder. 70% of the defendants were MNDAA fighters. Afterwards, the MNDAA led the three defendants quickly into the forest and executed them.

Divisions of Laukkai

== Administrative divisions ==
After MNDAA regained control of Laukkai in 2024, the city was divided into three wards:

- Dongcheng Ward (东城区)
- Laukkai Ward (老街区)
- Jinxiangcheng Ward (金象城区)

== See also ==
- Myanmar National Democratic Alliance Army (MNDAA)
- Kokang incident
- 2015 Kokang offensive
- Lào Cai (disambiguation)
