= Self-administered area (Myanmar) =

Administrative subdivision in Myanmar

A self-administered area (Burmese: ကိုယ်ပိုင်အုပ်ချုပ်ခွင့်ရစီရင်စု) is a type of administrative subdivision in some of the states and regions of Myanmar (Burma). The 2008 Constitution states that a self-administered division (Burmese: ကိုယ်ပိုင်အုပ်ချုပ်ခွင့်ရတိုင်း) and a self-administered zone (Burmese: ကိုယ်ပိုင်အုပ်ချုပ်ခွင့်ရဒေသ) have equal status as self-administered areas. Currently, there are five self-administered zones and one self-administered division.

== Description ==
The self-administered division (SAD) exists at an administrative level half-a-step below that of states, regions and the union territory, and the self-administrative zones (SAZ) exists at the district level, but the constitution gives them an equal status. Each self-administered area is administered by a "leading body" whose members are those members of their respective state and regional hluttlaw elected within the division and areas. The chief minister of a state or region formally appoints the chair upon selection by the leading body of the division or zones. The self-administered areas are formed on territory under de facto control of the country's ethnic armed organisations.

== Self-administered zones and self-administered division ==
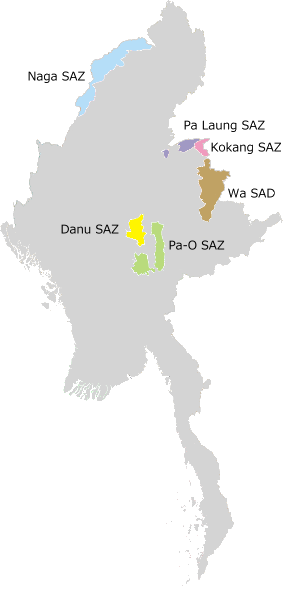
Self-Administered Zones and Self-Administered Division

Self-Administered Division
No.	Flag	Name	Burmese	Capital	Districts	Townships	Population
Within Shan State:
1.		Wa Self-Administered Division	ဝကိုယ်ပိုင်အုပ်ချုပ်ခွင့်ရတိုင်း	Hopang	Hopang	Hopang, Mongmao, Panwai,	558,000
1.		Wa Self-Administered Division	ဝကိုယ်ပိုင်အုပ်ချုပ်ခွင့်ရတိုင်း	Hopang	Metman	Nahpan, Metman, Pangsang (Pankham)	558,000

Self-Administered Zones
No.	Flag	Name	Burmese	Capital	Townships	Population
Within Sagaing Region:
1.		Naga Self-Administered Zone	နာဂကိုယ်ပိုင်အုပ်ချုပ်ခွင့်ရဒေသ	Lahe	Leshi, Lehe, Namyun	116,828
Within Shan State:
2.		Danu Self-Administered Zone	ဓနုကိုယ်ပိုင်အုပ်ချုပ်ခွင့်ရဒေသ	Pindaya	Ywangan, Pindaya	161,835
3.		Kokang Self-Administered Zone	ကိုးကန့်ကိုယ်ပိုင်အုပ်ချုပ်ခွင့်ရဒေသ	Laukkai	Konkyan, Laukkai	123,733
4.		Pa Laung Self-Administered Zone	ပလောင်းကိုယ်ပိုင်အုပ်ချုပ်ခွင့်ရဒေသ	Namhsan	Namhsan, Manton	110,805
5.		Pa'O Self-Administered Zone	ပအိုဝ့်ကိုယ်ပိုင်အုပ်ချုပ်ခွင့်ရဒေသ	Hopong	Hopong, Hshihseng, Pinlaung	380,427

== See also ==
- Administrative divisions of Myanmar
- Autonomous administrative division
