= Pheung Kya-shin =

Kokang army commander (1931–2022)

- 彭家声 ဖုန်ကြားရှင်
- A photo of Pheung taken between 2003-2004.

Chairperson of the People's Government of Kokang
- In office March 2011 – 16 February 2022
- Preceded by: Office established
- Succeeded by: Peng Daxun

Chairman of the Shan State Special region 1
- In office 20 December 1995 – 25 August 2009 in exile: 25 August 2009 – March 2011
- Deputy: Pheung Kya-fu; Yang Zhongwei (until 1997); Li Zhongxiang (1997-2005)
- Preceded by: Yang Mao-liang
- Succeeded by: Bai Xuoqian (Chairman of Shan State Special Region 1 Interim Management Committee)
- In office 3 January 1990 – 27 February 1993
- Preceded by: position created
- Succeeded by: Yang Mao-liang

Commander of the MNDAA
- In office 11 March 1989 – 27 February 1993
- Deputy: Pheung Kya-fu
- Preceded by: position created
- Succeeded by: Yang Mao-liang

Supreme Leader of the MNDAA
- In office 1995 – 16 February 2022

Personal details
- Born: 26 January 1932 Haungsawhtuuhaw Village, Kokang, British Raj
- Died: 16 February 2022 (aged 90) Mong La, Myanmar
- Relations: Pheung Daxun (son); Pheung Dali (son); Nang Yin (daughter); Pheung Kya-fu (brother); U Sai Leun (son-in-law)
- Nickname: King of Kokang

Military service
- Allegiance: Kokang Revolutionary Force (1963-1967); Kokang People's Liberation Army (1967–1968); Communist Party of Burma (1968–1989); Myanmar National Democratic Alliance Army (1989–2022)
- Years of service: 1965–2009
- Rank: Commander in chief of the MNDAA
- Battles/wars: Internal conflict in Myanmar: 2009 Kokang incident; 2015 Kokang offensive

Pheung Kya-shin (simplified Chinese: 彭家声; traditional Chinese: 彭家聲; pinyin: Péng Jiāshēng; Burmese: ဖုန်ကြားရှင်; 26 January 1932 – 16 February 2022) (Note: Other spellings include Peng Jiasheng, Phon Kyar Shin, Phone Kyar Shin, and Peng Kya Shen.) was the chairman of the Shan State Special Region No. 1 in Myanmar (Burma) and the leader of the Myanmar National Democratic Alliance Army (MNDAA) from 1989 to 2009.

== Biography ==
Pheung was born in the British Raj into the Peng family, related to the Chieftains of Kokang by marriage. He is of Chinese descent, and was born near Haungsawhtuuhaw Village (红石头河, ဟောင်ဆော်ထူးဟော်), Kokang in 1932 or 1931. He was the oldest of seven children. In 1949 he studied military affairs under Sao Edward Yang Kyein Tsai, the saopha of Kokang at that time, and became the captain of Yang's defense force, where he remained until Yang's was deposed by the Myanmar Armed Forces (the military junta ruling Burma) in 1965. Later that year he established the Kokang People's Revolutionary Army and began leading a small group of youth in guerilla warfare against the Myanmar Armed Forces.

In April 1969, Kokang province was established with Pheung as its leader. For 20 years he controlled Kokang as a member of the Communist Party of Burma (CPB). In 1989, however, the CPB split up and Pheung established his own army, the Myanmar National Democratic Alliance Army, with which he mutinied and captured the city of Mong Ko. After this he signed a cease-fire with the military junta, which allowed the Kokang army to retain their weapons, and established an autonomous Kokang region as the "First Special Region" of Myanmar.

Pheung has played a large role in drug production in Burma. According to Bertil Lintner, he established the first heroin factory in Kokang during the 1970s and continued trafficking heroin for at least 20 years. In 1990, he legalized opium planting in Kokang. Later, however, he said he opposed the drug trade: in a 1999 talk to journalists and narcotics experts he said he was working on "purging the area of opium", and that he had been trying to end the opium trade for 10 years. The Kokang government declared the region "drug-free" in 2003. The central government and narcotics experts, however, still suspect the region of being involved in the drug trade.

The cease-fire with the military junta was broken in August 2009 after the government sent troops to conduct a drug raid on a factory suspected of being a drug front, and on Pheung's own house. At the same time, Pheung was challenged from within the army, as his deputy Bai Suocheng and others were said to have become loyal to the junta. The confrontation with junta troops eventually led to violent conflict (the Kokang incident); Pheung himself was driven out by his competitors from within the army and is rumored to have fled, after a warrant was issued for his arrest.

He reappeared in an interview with the Chinese state newspaper Global Times in December 2014. He pledged to retake control of Kokang from the Myanmar Army. Armed clashes erupted in February 2015 between his troops and the Myanmar Army, with initial heavy casualties on the Burmese side.

Pheung was known to have close ties to Asia World's Lo Hsing Han, a former opium kingpin, and his son Steven Law (Tun Myint Naing), and was believed to have investments in Singapore through them.

He died on 16 February 2022 in Mong La, at the age of 91. His funeral was held on 30 March.
