= Kokang Self-Administered Zone =

Coordinates: 23°44′31″N 98°34′49″E

Kokang Self-Administered Zone ကိုးကန့်ကိုယ်ပိုင်အုပ်ချုပ်ခွင့်ရဒေသ 果敢自治区
- Self-administered zone
- Flag

- Location in Shan State
- Country: Myanmar
- State: Shan State
- No. of townships: 2
- Created: 20 August 2010
- De facto ceased: 5 January 2024
- Capital: Laukkai

Government
  - Chairman: Tun Tun Myint (de jure) vacant (de facto)

Area
  - Total: 1,844.1 km^{2} (712.0 sq mi)
- Elevation: 1,582 m (5,189 ft)

Population (2014)
  - Total: 154,912
- Time zone: UTC+6.30 (MMT)

Kokang Self-Administered Zone
- Simplified Chinese: 果敢自治区
- Traditional Chinese: 果敢自治區
Transcriptions
Standard Mandarin
- Hanyu Pinyin: Guǒgǎn Zìzhìqū

Burmese name
- Burmese: ကိုးကန့် ကိုယ်ပိုင်အုပ်ချုပ်ခွင့်ရ ဒေသ
- IPA: [kóka̰ɰ̃ kòbàɪɰ̃ ʔoʊʔtɕʰoʊʔ kʰwɪ̰ɰ̃ja̰ dèθa̰]

The Kokang Self-Administered Zone (Burmese: ကိုးကန့် ကိုယ်ပိုင်အုပ်ချုပ်ခွင့်ရ ဒေသ, Chinese: 果敢自治区), also Laukkaing District (Burmese: လောက်ကိုင်ခရိုင်) as stipulated by the 2008 Constitution of Myanmar, is a former de jure self-administered zone in northern Shan State. The zone is intended to be self-administered by the Kokang people. Its official name was announced by decree on 20 August 2010. It is recognized as illegal by the Myanmar National Democratic Alliance Army (MNDAA).

== History ==
During the 1960s, the Burmese Communist Party controlled large areas of Kokang, but as it began to disintegrate in the 1980s, Pheung Kya-shin (Peng Jiasheng) established the Myanmar National Democratic Alliance Army (MNDAA). In 1989, he negotiated a ceasefire with the military and was given some autonomy over the area. After the ceasefire, the area controlled by MNDAA became Myanmar's "Shan State Special Region No. 1" (Chinese: 缅甸掸邦第一特区; Burmese: မြန်မာနိုင်ငံ ရှမ်းပြည်နယ်အထူးဒေသ (၁)). Pheung was known unofficially as the 'King of Kokang' and he and the MNDAA had been involved in the drug industry since the 1970s in Kokang, where he trafficked heroin and later methamphetamine. However, Pheung later shifted the area's industry away from drugs and towards gambling. Peng lost control in 2009 in the Kokang incident.

On 17 February 2015, Myanmar president Thein Sein declared a state of emergency three-month period of martial law in Kokang in response to fighting between government troops and the Myanmar National Democratic Alliance Army, a rebel group. The curfew was extended on 9 September 2019.

A coup d'état took place on 1 February 2021, resulting in a military junta taking control of the country and triggering a civil war. In October 2023, anti-junta forces launched a military operation in northern Myanmar. On 28 December it was reported that "most" of the regional capital, Laukkai, was now under MNDAA control, with junta forces largely abandoning the city. The MNDAA gained full control of Laukkai following a mass surrender of the last junta forces in the city on 5 January 2024.

== Government and politics ==
The Kokang Self-Administered Zone (Kokang SAZ) is administered by a Leading Body, which consists of at least ten members and includes Shan State Hluttaw (Assembly) members elected from the Zone and members nominated by the Burmese Armed Forces. The Leading Body performs both executive and legislative functions and is led by a Chairperson. The Leading Body has competence in ten areas of policy, including urban and rural development, road construction and maintenance, and public health.

Bai Xuoqian was elected as an MP of the Amyotha Hluttaw representing Laukkai Constituency No. 2. during the 2010 general election, and became the first head of the Kokang SAZ. Under his rule, the region became known for drugs and weapons trafficking. Bai was not very popular and survived an assassination attempt in March 2012.

On 3 February 2021, shortly after the 2021 Myanmar coup d'état, the State Administration Council (SAC) appointed Myint Swe, a former Union Solidarity and Development Party lawmaker as the chairman of the Kokang SAZ.

In 2023, during Operation 1027, the SAC temporarily replaced Myint Swe by Brigadier General Tun Tun Myint and put out a warrant for former Kokang SAZ chairman, Bai Xuoqian. Tun Tun Myint was previously the commander in charge of northern Shan State operations. The move is understood to be in anticipation of Operation 1027 moving towards Laukkai.

A few days earlier, China had issued arrest warrants for junta-aligned cybercrime ringleader Ming Xuechang and three other family members for their involvement in online scamming operations. On 16 November 2023, three Ming family members were arrested and handed over to China. Ming Xuechang died while being arrested by the Myanmar police, and the Myanmar government claimed that he died by suicide. According to The Diplomat, this move signals China's "tacit support for the removal of the Kokang SAZ's leadership".

== Administrative divisions ==
Townships of Kokang SAZ: Konkyan Township Laukkaing Township

As stipulated by the 2008 constitution, Kokang Self-Administered Zone consists of two townships: Konkyan and Laukkaing, both townships are administratively to be part of Laukkaing District.

However, the Self-Administered Zone is de facto divided into two townships, two subtownships and one area:

- Konkyan Township (拱掌区, ကုန်ကြမ်းမြို့နယ်)
- Laukkaing Township (老街区, လောက်ကိုင်မြို့နယ်)
- Chinshwehaw Subtownship (清水河镇, ချင်းရွှေဟော်မြို့)
- Mawhtike Subtownship (慕泰镇, မော်တိုက်မြို့)
- Kunlong Area (滚弄地区, ကွမ်းလုံဒေသ)

== Chairmen of Kokang SAZ ==
No.	Name	Term of office			Political party
No.	Name	Took office	Left office	Time in office	Political party
1	Bai Xuoqian 白所成 ပယ်စောက်ချိန်	20 August 2010	30 March 2016	6 years, 219 days	Union Solidarity and Development Party
2	Zhao Dechen 赵德强 ကျောက်တယ်ချန်	30 March 2016	19 February 2021	4 years, 326 days	Union Solidarity and Development Party
3	Li Zhanfu (Myint Swe) 李正福 လီကျန်းဖု(ခ)မြင့်ဆွေ	19 February 2021	9 November 2023	2 years, 263 days	Union Solidarity and Development Party
-	Brigadier General Tun Tun Myint ဒုတိယဗိုလ်မှူးကြီး ထွန်းထွန်းမြင့်	9 November 2023	5 January 2024 (de facto)	57 days	Military

== See also ==
- Constitution of Myanmar
- 2009 Kokang incident
- 2015 Kokang offensive
- Pheung Kya-shin
