= Myanmar National Democratic Alliance Army =

Ethnic armed organisation in northern Myanmar

- 缅甸民族民主同盟军 မြန်မာ့အမျိုးသားဒီမိုကရက်တစ်မဟာမိတ်တပ်မတော်
- Other name: Kokang army Kokang Group
- Leader: Peng Daxun
- Spokesperson: Li Jiawen
- Dates active: 12 March 1989 – present
- Allegiance: People's Government of Kokang (since 2011)
- Active regions: Kokang, Myanmar
- Ideology: Kokang nationalism Ethno-nationalism; Anti-Bamar chauvinism Anti-Han chauvinism (claimed); Chinese nationalism Communism; Xi Jinping Thought (since Peng Daxun)
- Size: 6,000+
- Part of: Myanmar National Truth and Justice Party
- Flag
- Website: kokang123.blogspot.com

Myanmar National Democratic Alliance Army
- Simplified Chinese: 缅甸民族民主同盟军
- Traditional Chinese: 緬甸民族民主同盟軍
Transcriptions
Standard Mandarin
- Hanyu Pinyin: Miǎndiàn mínzú mínzhǔ tóngméng jūn

The Myanmar National Democratic Alliance Army (MNDAA) (Note: Also known as the Myanmar Nationalities Democratic Alliance Army and Kokang Army.) is an armed group in the Kokang region of Myanmar (formerly known as Burma). The army has existed since 1989, having been the first one to sign a ceasefire agreement with the Burmese government. The ceasefire lasted for about two decades.

== History ==
The group was formed on 12 March 1989, after the head of the local Communist Party of Burma branch in Kokang, Pheung Kya-shin (also spelt Peng Jia Sheng or Phone Kyar Shin), dissatisfied with the communist party's leadership, broke away and formed the MNDAA. Along with his brother, Peng Jiafu, they became the new unit in Kokang. The strength of the army is between 1,500 and 2,000 men.

The rebels soon became the first group to agree to a ceasefire with the government troops. As the first group in the Shan State area to sign a ceasefire, the Burmese central government referred to the Kokang region controlled by the MNDAA as "Shan State Special Region 1" (Chinese: 缅甸掸邦第一特区; Burmese: မြန်မာနိုင်ငံ ရှမ်းပြည်နယ်အထူးဒေသ (၁)). After the ceasefire, the area underwent an economic boom, with both the MNDAA and regional Myanmar Armed Forces (Tatmadaw) troops profiting from increased opium harvests and heroin-refining. The area also produces methamphetamine. The MNDAA and other paramilitary groups control the cultivation areas, making them an easy target for drug trafficking and organised crime groups. The Peace Myanmar Group allegedly launders and reinvests MNDAA's drug profits into the legal economy.

=== 2009 Kokang conflict ===
In August 2009, the Myanmar National Democratic Alliance Army became involved in a violent conflict with the Myanmar Armed Forces. This was the largest outbreak of fighting between ethnic armies and government troops since the signing of the ceasefire 20 years earlier.

As a result of the conflict, the MNDAA lost control of Kokang, and as many as 30,000 refugees fled to Yunnan province in neighbouring China. The Kokang area became the Kokang Self-Administered Zone on 20 August 2010, however, it was recognized as illegal by MNDAA.

=== 2015 offensive ===
On 9 February 2015 the MNDAA tried to retake the area, clashing with Burmese government forces in Laukkai. The skirmishes left a total of 47 Government soldiers dead and 73 wounded. After several months of intense conflict, Kokang insurgents had failed to capture Laukkai. Following the incident, the government of China was accused of giving military assistance to the ethnic Kokang soldiers.

=== 2017 clashes ===
On 6 March 2017, MNDAA insurgents attacked police and military posts in Laukkai, resulting in the deaths of 30 people.

=== 2021 post-coup resistance ===
Clashes with the Tatmadaw resumed after the military coup, when the MNDAA, alongside its allies of the Brotherhood Alliance, the Arakan Army and Ta'ang National Liberation Army, attacked a police station south of Lashio, killing at least 14 police officers and burning the station to the ground. MNDAA and TNLA further launched attacks in multiple locations in Northern Shan State on 4 and 5 May 2021, inflicting heavy casualties on the Myanmar military.

The MNDAA were involved in Operation 1027 in October 2023, launching coordinated attacks and seizing governmental military outposts ranging from Lashio to Hopang Township in northern Shan State. On 28 October 2023 it was reported that Chinshwehaw had come fully under control of the MNDAA during the ongoing civil war. On 5 January 2024, the MNDAA gained full control of Laukkai, the capital of Kokang, following a mass surrender of the last Burmese military junta forces. In the same day, the MNDAA claimed the "liberation" of Kokang. On 11 January, the junta and the Brotherhood Alliance reached a ceasefire under Chinese sponsorship in northern Shan State. On 25 June, the TNLA announced that it was resuming military operations against the junta in reaction to repeated ceasefire violations and launched simultaneous attacks in coordination with local PDF groups. The same day, the MNDAA and its allies attacked several military bases around Lashio and began surrounding the city. On 14 July, the group announced a four-day halt in fighting to avoid interfering with the third plenary session of the 20th Central Committee of the Chinese Communist Party.

On 2 September, the SAC declared the MNDAA as a terrorist group.

=== 2024 ceasefire ===
On 18 September, the MNDAA declared that they would not form alliances with the NUG or "foreign communities opposing China and Myanmar." They further declared the ceasing of all military action against the SAC junta, except in cases of self-defense.

=== 2025 further ceasefire ===
Citing China's foreign ministry, Reuters reported the Myanmar military and MNDAA signed a formal ceasefire agreement starting on 18 January 2025, following talks in Kunming. On 20 January, Myanmar Now reported that under China's pressure, MNDAA had "agreed to return control of the northern Shan State capital to the Myanmar military regime," and that ceasefire agreement terms may include MNDAA's withdrawal from Lashio by June. However, neither side has publicly revealed the conditions of the ceasefire deal. The Myanmar Now article notes that commander Peng Daxun had been "summoned to China's Yunnan Province in late October and held there indefinitely" under detention, and his "status and whereabouts are still unknown". In April 2025, the MNDAA withdrew from Lashio as part of its ceasefire deal with the military junta, though reportedly retained control of the settlements on the city's outskirts.

=== Clashes with TNLA ===
On 14 March 2026, the MNDAA launched artillery strikes and ground attacks against TNLA positions in Kutkai. Since February 2026, both groups clashed with each other over control of territory in Kutkai Township; this led to price surges in basic goods from trade blockades. On 16 March 2026, the MNDAA seized full control of Kutkai from TNLA.

== Criticism ==
MNDAA has held multiple public executions. The European Union condemned the executions "in the strongest term", calling them "an inhuman and degrading punishment that represents an ultimate denial of human dignity".

The group has also been accused of forcibly recruiting migrant workers as fighters and executing deserters. MNDAA forcibly recruited civilians during and after the launch of Operation 1027 in October 2023, targeting the military junta in northern Shan State. They abducted civilians from refugee camps and fleeing convoys, demanded manpower quotas from local communities, targeted children as young as 10, and threatened or retaliated against those who report these incidents or escape recruitment. When confronted, the MNDAA justified its actions as being consistent with its own laws.

While the MNDAA is part of the anti-junta resistance, its actions have been criticized for undermining broader democratic aspirations and fueling inter-ethnic conflict. Analysts note that the group's focus has shifted from establishing a federal democratic union to pursuing narrow ethno-nationalist and territorial expansionist goals. This shift potentially sidelines inclusive political solutions and challenges the unity of the broader pro-democracy movement in Myanmar.

The MNDAA's military offensives have upset the status quo on the China-Myanmar border, annoying Beijing, which supports Myanmar's military regime and sees its economic interests at risk. Its capture of strategic locations such as the northern Shan State capital Lashio has prompted China to intervene and force the MNDAA to return the northern Shan State capital to Myanmar junta control. This in turn sparked protest from residents, who accused the armed group of selling them out to the central military regime.

== See also ==
- Shan State Army
