= 2026 Kutkai offensive =

Part of the Myanmar civil war

- Part of the Myanmar civil war of the Myanmar conflict
Date	14–20 March 2026
Location	Kutkai and Namhkam, Shan State, Myanmar
Result	Ceasefire agreement; TNLA forced to cede Kutkai to MNDAA and MNDAA withdraws from positions around Namhkam; Tensions between the MNDAA and the KIA have been growing since July 2026

Belligerents
People's Government of Kokang; Myanmar National Democratic Alliance Army Supported by: People's Republic of China (alleged)	Ta'ang People's Government; Ta'ang National Liberation Army	Kachin State Special Region 2; Kachin Independence Army

From 14 March until 20 March 2026, the Myanmar National Democratic Alliance Army carried out an offensive against the Ta'ang National Liberation Army within the Kutkai Township.

== Background ==
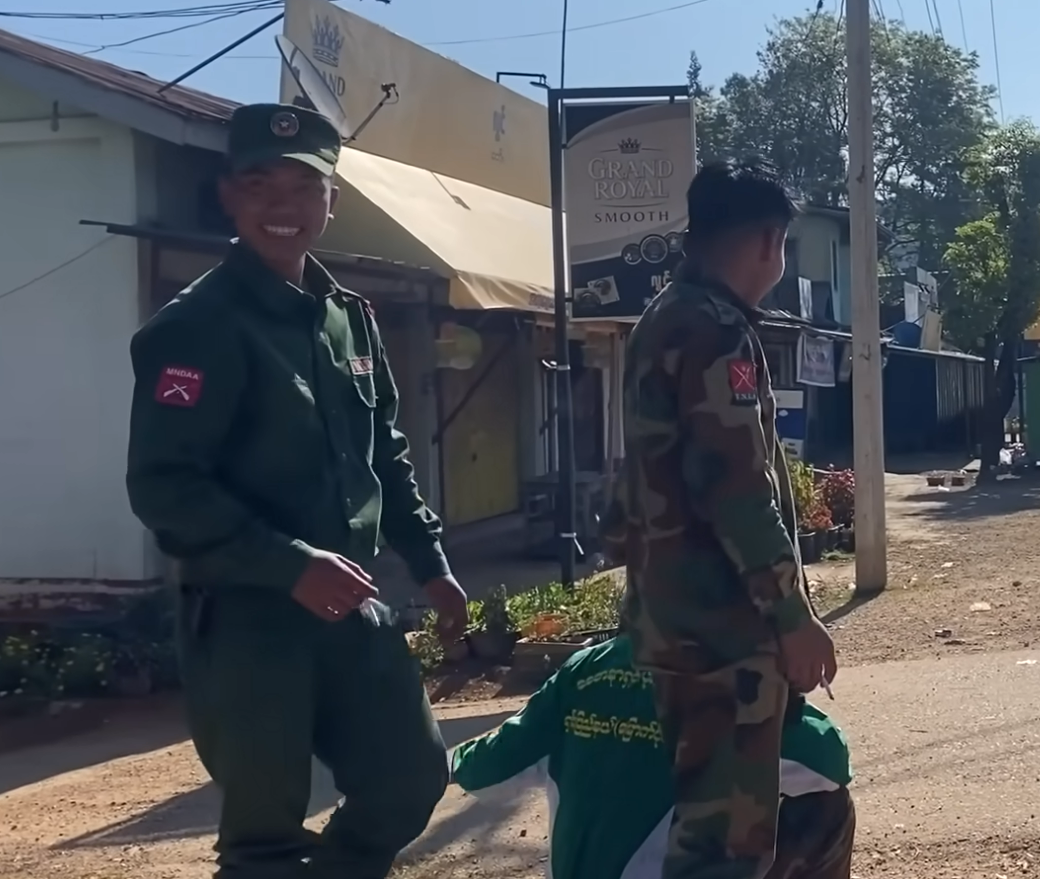
Members of MNDAA and TNLA in Kutkai in January 2024.

The Myanmar National Democratic Alliance Army and the Ta'ang National Liberation Army, two ethnic armed organisations within Myanmar, were formerly allies as part of the Three Brotherhood Alliance, Federal Political Negotiation and Consultative Committee and the Northern Alliance. Throughout the 2010s, and during Operation 1027, MNDAA and TNLA forces commonly fought together. However, following the stalling of Operation 1027 in 2025, tensions began intensifying within Northern Shan State regarding overlapping territorial claims.

In January 2024, the MNDAA and the TNLA captured Kutkai, agreeing to jointly administer the town. The MNDAA controlled the east side, while the TNLA controlled the west side.

=== Beginning of tensions ===
Two years following Kutkai's capture, on 13 February 2026, the TNLA forcefully removed MNDAA administrative officers and confiscated solar panels and security cameras installed by the MNDAA along the main Union Road in Kutkai. The reason for this is the Chinese presence in the territory of both. In MNDAA territory, the government confiscated land of various ethnic groups, including the ones of Ta'ang and gave it to Chinese businesses; also, local Ta'ang women in Kutkai were reportedly drawn into prostitution. This was a reason for the TNLA to remove MNDAA officials in Kutkai. Tensions escalated further when the MNDAA detained TNLA officials; both reinforced their positions and remain on combat readiness. On 16 February, TNLA forces stormed an MNDAA office in Kutkai. On 17 February, the MNDAA accused the TNLA of attempting to seize Hsenwi. The TNLA brought the issue to the Federal Political Negotiation and Consultative Committee Alliance, which,h however, did not lead to a result. The TNLA tried to de-escalate the situation and, on 21 February, sent a letter in which they requested that TNLA and MNDAA officials meet, which the MNDAA refused. The MNDAA had a condition for a meeting with TNLA officials; part of the condition was the4 reinstatment of MNDAA administrative authority officials in Kutkai. As response the TNLA sent a letter to the local government of the Yunnan Province of the People's Republic of China to ask for mediation. As result of all this commodity prices rose in Kutkai.

On 10 March the MNDAA began to block the transport of goods to TNLA-controlled territory. Three day's later the TNLA forces blocked unilateral MNDAA attempts to install CCTV systems in Kutkai. The TNLA leadership cited unresolved disagreements over governance arrangements, while the MNDAA accused the TNLA of initiating hostilities. The MNDAA also restricted the flow of goods and fuel into TNLA-controlled territory.

== Timeline ==
A solution for the situation couldn't be found, and as a result, the Myanmar National Democratic Alliance Army started an offensive against the Ta'ang National Liberation Army on 14 March 2026, which led to MNDAA's full takeover of Kutkai the next day.

On 16 March 2026, an article that included the sayings of TNLA's Spokesperson Lway Yay Oo was published. Lway Yay Oo said that the TNLA will try to solve the conflict through dialogue. Negotiations were started on the same day.

On 17 March 2026, it was reported that MNDAA fighters pressed the Kachin Independence Army to dismantle their checkpoints along the Lashio-Muse road near Nant Hpat Kar village in Kutkai Township; the KIA reported, however, that no formal request by the MNDAA was made. Later it was reported that the MNDAA removed the KIA's tax-collection gates in Nam Hpat Kar.

On 18 March 2026, the People's Republic of China warned the other members of the Federal Political Negotiation and Consultative Committee to not intervene in the conflict.

On 20 March an creasefire agreement was made, in which the TNLA agreed to give control of Kutkai to the MNDAA, as response the MNDAA withdrawed from positions around Namhkam. Duwa Lashi La the acting President of the National Unity Government of Myanmar supported the negotiations of the MNDAA and the TNLA.
