= Ta'ang People's Government =

TNLA's Administration of its territory

Ta’ang People’s Government
- Flag Coat of arms

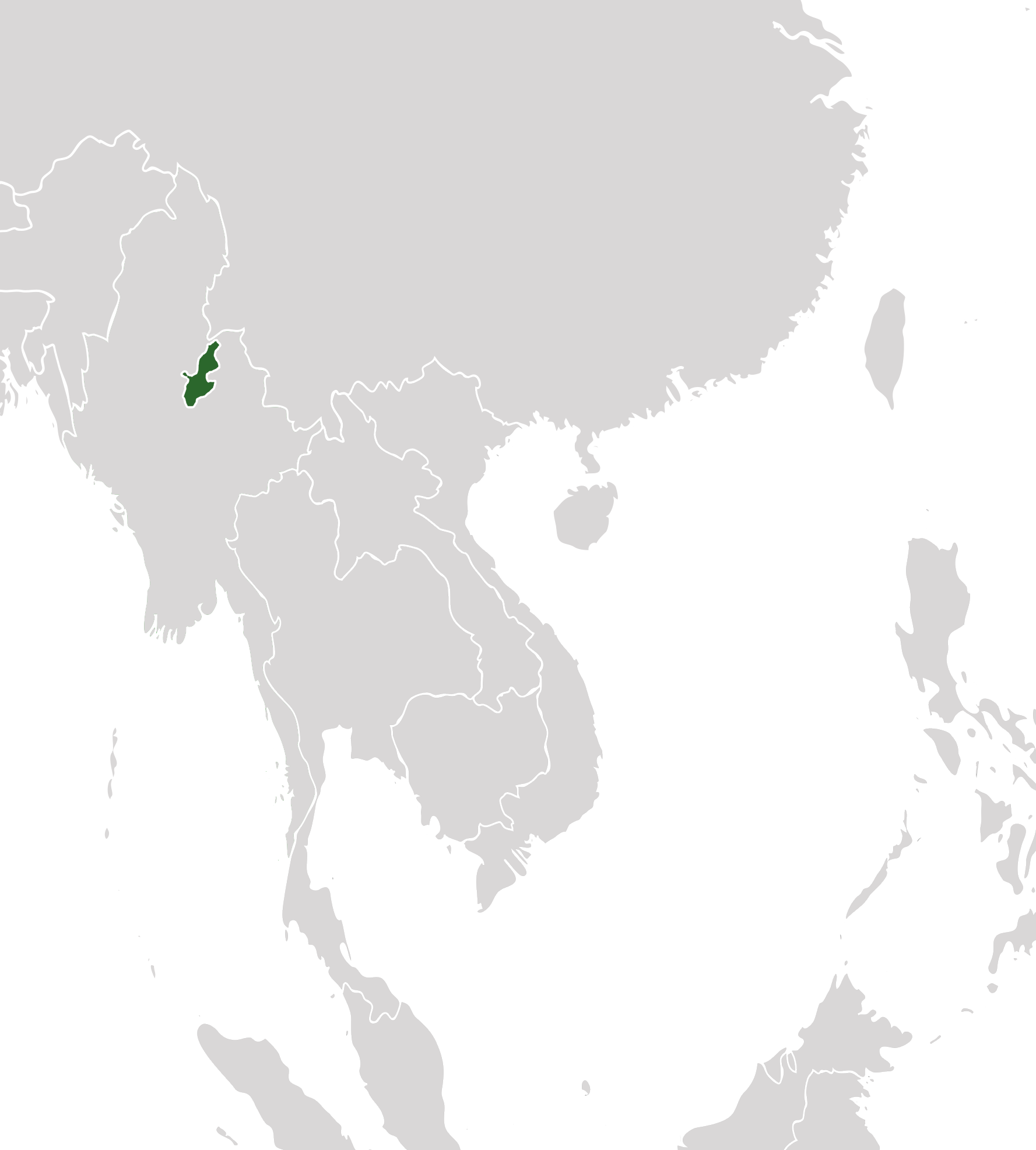
- Ta'ang National Liberation Army
- Status: De facto state and rival government
- Capital: Namhsan (since 2023)
- Government: Bureaucracy
  - Chairman of the PSLF and Commander-in-Chief of the TNLA: Tar Aik Bong
  - Secretary General of the PSLF and Second-in-command of the TNLA: Tar Bone Kyaw
  - Spokesperson of the TNLA: Lway Yay Oo
- Legislature: Ta'ang Land Council; Historical: Ta’ang State Constitutional Drafting Committee
- Establishment: Myanmar conflict
  - Established: 31 December 2011
  - Adopting the name of Ta’ang People’s Government: 2025

Population
  - 2023 estimate: 645,246
  - Census: Ta'ang people (19.9%)

Ta'ang Land also Ta'ang State, Ta’ang Land administration, Liberated areas or officially since 2025 the Ta’ang People’s Government or sometimes called Self-Administered Zone 3 which is another name of the autonomous Pa Laung Self-Administered Zone refers to the territory controlled by the Ta'ang National Liberation Army and the Palaung State Liberation Front. In the areas it controls, the PSLF has set up a bureaucracy of 1,500 staff divided into 13 departments.

== Background ==
On April 21, 1991, the Palaung State Liberation Front made peace with the central government, afterwards the Seventh Special Region of Northern Shan State was established. In October 2009, the Palaung State Liberation Front held its 3rd congress, and its leaders Tar Aik Bong and Tar Bone Kyaw announced the creation of the Ta'ang National Liberation Army as its armed wing. The TNLA succeeded with that the Palaung State Liberation Front as armed wing, which was established in 1992, however the PSLF continued to exist as political organization.

== Formation ==
On 31 December 2011, the Ta'ang National Liberation Army started its offensive and re-entered the Shweli Valley area, though the Shweli River which runs from the southern side of Namkham.

== Government ==
In the areas it controls, the PSLF has set up a bureaucracy of 1,500 staff divided into 13 departments. Many of these lower-ranking administrators are members of the junta's administrative apparatus assimilated by the TNLA as it took control of their villages. This administrative network comprises "a central office, five district-level offices, eighteen offices at the township level and many more at the village-tract level".

=== Public services ===
The TNLA has set up its own education system in partnership with local civil society groups and NUG workers, under the umbrella of the Ta’ang National Education Committee (TNEC). In 2023, the committee said it ran more than 420 schools, educating around 25,000 students.

==== Police ====
In 2018, the TNLA set up its own police force to maintain public order. The group also operates a parallel justice system with dedicated courts and prisons by recruiting civil servants and lawyers who sought refuge in its territory after defecting from the junta. In June 2023, the TNLA announced that it would establish forest reserve areas to prevent deforestation and preserve local species.

=== Economy ===
The TNLA largely generates revenue through taxes on the transportation of goods and people. Another source of revenue is the payment of fees by Chinese contractors conducting infrastructure projects in the region in exchange for ensuring their free access and safety.

On 30 May 2025, it was reported that the Chinese government restricted trade of various goods like medicine and fuel. This led to further tensions with the People's Republic of China.

Since July 2026, rare earth mining started in the territory of the TNLA.

=== Anti-drug operations ===
The TNLA opposes the drug trade and drug use, which it sees as a health disaster for the local population, conducting operations where it destroys poppy fields, heroin refineries, and meth labs. The TNLA claims that it arrests opium smugglers regularly and the narcotics seized are publicly burned on special occasions to deter drug trade. In August 2012, a PSLF Central Committee meeting set up a 5-year plan to eradicate drugs, and in 2014 the group claimed to have destroyed "more than 1,000 acres of opium farms in Ta’ang regions" in two years. The group regularly detains drug users and sends them to “detention centres” to cut them off from their addictions. It also discourages local farmers from growing poppies by offering them crop substitution programs and interest-free micro-financing.

The TNLA has also been accused of making money by taxing the local drug market, despite its anti-drug stance. It has kidnapped resisters and detained them until a ransom is paid.

=== Subdivisions ===
In 2024, it was announced to establish town administrations.

== Society ==
TNLA territory includes Kachin, Shan, and Bamar populations, but most notably the Ta’ang, who constitute roughly 19.9% of the total population in these areas.

== Relations ==
In May 2018, the TNLA opened its first liaison office in Pangkham, the de facto capital of Wa State. This led to a deterioration in relations with the KIA, coupled with mutual accusations of mistreatment of the local population. Tensions with the SSPP over the control and administration of territories liberated from the junta have also arisen. TNLA members met with government member of Myanmar, one condition of the TNLA was a Autonomous Ta'ang State.

== Territorial development ==
=== 2023 ===
On 5 December 2023, the TNLA captured Kutkai, Monglon of the Kyuame Township was also captured. The TNLA promised to establish a civil administration in Kutkai and other six towns.

On 15 December 2023 Namhsan fell under the control of the Ta'ang National Liberation Army (TNLA) rebel group after two weeks of fighting against the military junta State Administration Council (SAC).

On 19 December 2023, Namkhan came under TNLA control.

Between 22 December and 23 December 2023, the Mantong Township was captured by the TNLA.

On 28 December 2023, the TNLA took control over the Namtu Township.

On 31 December 2023, Mongngwat of the Kyuame Township came under control of the TNLA.

=== 2024 ===
In May 2024, the Ta'ang National Liberation Army launched an offensive on the town of Hsipaw.

On 18 June 2024, the TNLA announced that one of its fighters had been killed and four others injured by a junta drone strike in Nawnghkio Township.

On 25 June 2024, the TNLA declared it was resuming Operation 1027 in response to repeated ceasefire violations by the junta and launched attacks in Nawnghkio and Kyaukme townships in coordination with local PDF units.

On 26 June 2024, TNLA took control of the town of Nawnghkio and seized several positions near Kyaukme.

On 28 June 2024, TNLA captured Kyaukme and began to encircle Mogok, taking over several nearby military bases.

=== 2025 ===
The Tatmadaw recaptured the town of Nawnghkio on 16 July 2025.

In October 2025, TNLA also lost the towns of Hsipaw and Kyaukme to the Tatmadaw.

=== 2026 ===
In March 2026, the Ta'ang National Liberation Army lost control over Kutkai to its former ally Myanmar National Democratic Alliance Army. Tensions had escalated over territorial administration, checkpoints, and control of the Union Highway through Kutkai, which forms part of the principal trade route between Lashio and the Chinese border. On 31 May, 55 people were killed though a explosion in the Kaung Tat village, which is controlled by the TNLA. In June 2026, residents and civil groups urged the TNLA to punish the ones behind the explosion. Day's after the TNLA established the Kaung Tat Village Rehabilitation Committee, overseeing distributing aid and donations to the victims.

== See also ==
- People's Government of Kokang
- Wa State
- Chinland
- Karenni State Interim Executive Council
- Republic of Kawthoolei
- Sagaing Federal Unit Interim Government
- Territory of the Kachin Independence Army
- Territory of the Arakan Army
