= Battle of Lashio =

2024 capture of Lashio by Myanmar rebels

- Part of Operation 1027 in the Myanmar civil war
- Controlled by the Three Brotherhood Alliance Controlled by the UWSA
Date	2 July – 3 August 2024 (1 month and 1 day)
Location	Lashio; Lashio Township 22°57′59″N 97°45′09″E
Result	Rebel victory
Territorial changes	Rebel forces captured Lashio city and surrounding areas

Belligerents
State Administration Council	Three Brotherhood Alliance; People's Liberation Army; Bamar People's Liberation Army United Wa State Army (non-combatant)

Commanders and leaders
Brig. Gen. Thant Htin Soe (POW); Brig. Gen. Tin Tun Aung †; Col. Hla Min †; Maj. Gen. Soe Tint (POW); Brig. Gen. Myo Min Htwe (POW)	Peng Daxun Tar Aik Bong

Units involved
Tatmadaw: Myanmar Army; Northeastern Regional Military Command; Myanmar Air Force; Border Guard Force; Myanmar Police Force	Three Brotherhood Alliance: Myanmar National Democratic Alliance Army; Ta'ang National Liberation Army; People's Liberation Army; Bamar People's Liberation Army

Strength
5,000	6,000+

Casualties and losses
2,000 killed 4,783 surrendered (including 2,000 soldiers)	500+ killed, 1,000+ wounded (per the MNDAA)
- 300 civilians killed

The Battle of Lashio was an offensive conducted by the Three Brotherhood Alliance, along with other anti-junta resistance forces, to capture the northern Shan city of Lashio during the Myanmar civil war. Serving as the headquarters for the Tatmadaw's Northeastern Command, the city was besieged by rebel forces following the collapse of the Chinese-mediated ceasefire that had paused the rebels' Operation 1027.

== Background ==
During the first phase of Operation 1027, resistance forces seized several towns surrounding Lashio, including Hsenwi, Namtu, and Kutkai. They also took control of the road between Lashio and Mandalay, cutting the city off from reinforcement except by air. Following the city's encirclement, junta forces destroyed several bridges leading into the city to try and prevent rebel forces from advancing further. While the city appeared to be a key target for the resistance following the fall of Laukkai, the conflict in Northern Shan was halted by a ceasefire mediated by China.

The ceasefire agreement collapsed in late June 2024 after the Ta'ang National Liberation Army (TNLA), a Brotherhood Alliance member, launched attacks in response to alleged junta violations of the ceasefire. The rebel forces took control of the towns of Kyaukme and Nawnghkio on the road from Lashio to Mandalay, further consolidating the rebels' encirclement. On 2 July, the Myanmar National Democratic Alliance Army (MNDAA), another member of the alliance, joined the offensive, attacking junta positions around Lashio with the TNLA. The military responded to the attacks with airstrikes and indiscriminate shelling. As fighting moved closer to the city proper, families of soldiers were evacuated, and thousands of civilians fled the conflict zone.

== Battle ==
Resistance forces began to advance into the city on 6 July 2024, shelling and using drones to bomb the junta's headquarters inside of the city. On 14 July, the MNDAA announced a four-day halt in its operations to avoid interfering with the ongoing third plenary session of the 20th Central Committee of the Chinese Communist Party. However, clashes continued despite the unilateral ceasefire. On 17 July, anti-junta forces captured army checkpoints outside of Lashio, forcing soldiers to withdraw into the city. The MNDAA captured the No. (68) Infantry Regiment on 23 July, capturing 317 POWs, including a lieutenant colonel, two majors, and five captains in the northern part of the city.

On 25 July, the MNDAA claimed to have taken control of the junta's Northeastern Regional Military Command headquarters inside the city, but this claim was denied by the junta. The rebels reported their fighters only had to capture a few remaining military holdouts in the city. On 26 July it was reported that the junta had ordered its remaining officials to leave Lashio as MNDAA troops swept through remaining pockets of resistance. Clashes were reportedly ongoing in the morning at Lashio Motel, Lashio University, and around Mansu Pagoda. On the same day MNDAA rebels captured Ava Bank branch and Lashio Hospital.

On 27 July clashes were still ongoing with 20% of Lashio's civilian populace still trapped in the city. Routes were opened for civilians to flee. The same day, the MNDAA captured the 41st Battalion Base, the 902nd Engineering Battalion Base, and a toll gate. On 28 July MNDAA troops freed 200 political prisoners, including Tun Tun Hein, after capturing Lashio prison. On 30 July the MNDAA ambushed a junta convoy from Tangyan that was meant to resupply Lashio, reportedly killing more than 50 soldiers. On the same day, the MNDAA captured Lashio Airport. On 1 August rebel forces raided the North East Command Post, resulting in heavy clashes and casualties on both sides. Following the raid, only around 400 soldiers remained in the headquarters. That evening, the Myanmar Air Force launched an airstrike on a hospital under the control of the MNDAA in Laukkai city, killing 10 people. On the same day, the MNDAA seized Supply & Logistics Battalion 626, capturing two BTR-3 infantry fighting vehicles.

On 2 August, rebel forces stormed the military hospital in Lashio with unconfirmed reports of some patients and staff being killed. According to some reports, the MNDAA attackers committed a massacre, murdering reportedly over 100 people, including children, medical staff, and patients who had remained in the hospital after the fighting subsided. On 3 August, MNDAA forces entered the Northeast Command headquarters and raised their flag there. The MNDAA destroyed two WMA-301 assault guns and two BTR-3 infantry fighting vehicles during the battle at the Northeastern Command Headquarter. The same morning, the last junta holdouts inside Lashio were reportedly defeated.

=== UWSA deployment ===
On the night of 27 July, hundreds of United Wa State Army (UWSA) fighters entered Lashio to protect their external relations office and properties in the township. They communicated their intentions to both sides and reaffirmed their neutrality. On 8 August, UWSA reportedly deployed another batch of fighters armed with anti-aircraft guns to Lashio.

== Aftermath and significance ==
Lashio was reported as being a major strategic target for resistance forces to capture, and its fall to the MNDAA dealt a major blow to the junta, severing contact between Naypyidaw and junta forces further north in the country. According to Nathan Ruser, an analyst at the Australian Strategic Policy Institute, Lashio's capture "[...] basically eliminates the junta as an effective organized force from a huge part of the country..."

In April 2025, the MNDAA withdrew from Lashio vacating it as part of a ceasefire agreement brokered by China. The decision came amid significant diplomatic and economic pressure from Beijing which had intervened to stabilize the escalating conflict in the region. By 21 April, the city had been partially returned to junta control without resistance. However, the settlement's outskirts remained under insurgent control.
