= Ta'ang Land Council =

The Ta'ang Land Council (TLC) is the highest political governing body to oversee executive, legislative, and judicial functions within the territories controlled by the Palaung State Liberation Front (PSLF) and its armed wing, the Ta'ang National Liberation Army (TNLA). Its formation in January 2025 marks a significant step in the PSLF/TNLA's efforts to establish a functioning civil administration and state-building process following major territorial gains.

== Background and formation ==
The Ta'ang Land Council was established as a direct result of the Three Brotherhood Alliance, which included the TNLA, achieving significant military victories during Operation 1027, which started in late 2023. During this offensive, the TNLA seized control of at least seven towns in northern Shan State, including the administrative capital of the Ta'ang Self-Administered Zone, Namhsan, as well as the important trade towns of Namkham and Kutkai.

With control over a significant and contiguous territory for the first time, the PSLF/TNLA faced the urgent need to transition from military operations to civil governance. Land administration, being a primary function of any state and a root cause of conflict in the region, was identified as a critical priority.

From June 1 to 3, 2025, the Ta'ang Political Consultative Committee (TPCC) convened a high-level summit in Pangsang, the administrative center of Wa State, which is under the control of the United Wa State Army (UWSA), a key ally of the Ta'ang National Liberation Army (TNLA). The meeting brought together members of the TNLA, the Ta'ang National Party (TNP), and various Ta'ang civil society organizations to deliberate on the region’s political future.

At the conclusion of the summit, participants formally endorsed the "Ta'ang State Revolutionary Government Plan", a document prepared by the Ta'ang State Constitutional Drafting Committee (TSCDC). As part of the new political framework, the TPCC announced its transformation into the Ta'ang Land Council (TLC), which would serve as the supreme governing body for Ta'ang State during the ongoing revolutionary period. The newly established council is expected to assume leadership roles across all branches of governance, including executive, legislative, and judicial functions.

According to the TPCC, the newly formed Ta’ang Land Council (TLC) comprises key political and military figures, including General Tar Aik Bong (Chairman of the TNLA), Lwe Moe Kham, Tar Aye Maung, General Tar Khu Lan (TNLA Vice Chairman-2), Ta Aung Pe, Tar Kyaw Tun, Lwe Moe Hlaing, Lwe Poe Kame' Chaing, and Captain Lwe Ye (TNLA).
