= Naungmon raid =

Battle in the Myanmar civil war (2021-present)

Naungmon ambush
- Part of the Myanmar civil war (2021–present)
Date	April 10, 2021
Location	Naungmon, Shan State, Myanmar
Result	Three Brotherhood Alliance victory

Belligerents
Myanmar: Tatmadaw	Three Brotherhood Alliance: MNDAA; TNLA

Casualties and losses
14 killed 2 missing	None
- 7 police family members injured

On April 10, 2021, fighters from the Ta'ang National Liberation Army (TNLA) and Myanmar National Democratic Alliance Army (MNDAA) attacked a police station controlled by Tatmadaw, killing fourteen police officers. The Naungmon ambush was the first attack by the Three Brotherhood Alliance during the Myanmar civil war and after the 2021 Myanmar coup d'état.

== Background ==
On February 1, 2021, the Tatmadaw led by Min Aung Hlaing overthrew the democratically elected Burmese government of Aung San Suu Kyi, sparking nationwide protests and subsequent crackdowns by Burmese police and soldiers. The coup d'etat renewed recruitment for the various ethnic armed organizations across the country, including the Three Brotherhood Alliance composed of the TNLA, MNDAA, and Arakan Army (AA), based in northern Shan State, Kokang, and Rakhine State respectively. The 3BA had been waging a low-level insurgency since 2020, and had helped the AA during their offensives fending off the Tatmadaw during the Rohingya genocide in 2017 and 2018. At the start of the coup d'etat, many other ethnic armed organizations across Myanmar had fought back against the Tatmadaw since day one, although the 3BA was in a truce with the Tatmadaw and did not initially fight them.

== Ambush ==
Armed men shot at and torched the Naungmon police outpost while Tatmadaw soldiers and police officers were inside of it at around 7 am on April 10, sparking a firefight. Residents who witnessed the attack stated that they believed it was the TNLA and MNDAA who attacked the outpost, and that they had arrived suddenly. Tatmadaw helicopters arrived on scene as reinforcements at around 8 a.m., by which point the fighters had fled. At around 12 p.m. that same day, clashes broke out in the village of Kheyning in between Naungmon and Lashio as the Tatmadaw went on the offensive. The fire at the police outpost continued until midday on April 11, and several vehicles and a lot of equipment was damaged or destroyed.

Witnesses stated that eight police officers had been killed when they arrived on scene, and Shan News Agency stated that ten were killed. Shwe Phee Myay News, a local media outlet, stated that fourteen officers were killed, two were missing, and seven family members of the officers were injured. A spokesman for the TNLA stated that the group was still investigating the attack, and denied responsibility for it. Tatmadaw officers fled to the village of Panning. Burmese forces also strengthened curfews and security in Lashio in preparation for attacks by the TNLA.
