= Tar Bone Kyaw =

Myanmar military and political leader

- တာဘုန်းကျော်
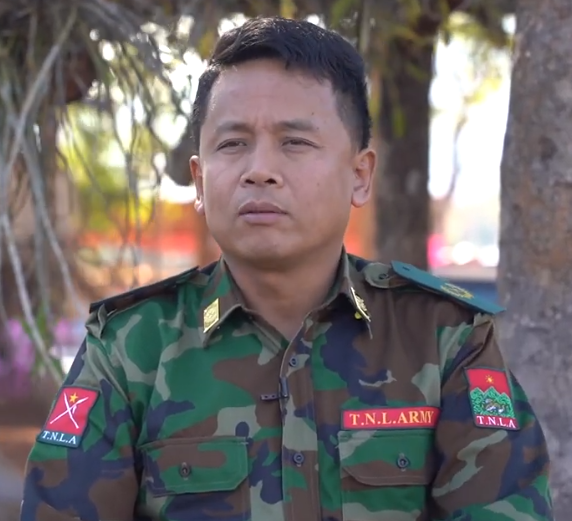
- Tar Bone Kyaw in 2023
- Military career
- Allegiance: Ta'ang National Liberation Army
- Service years: January 1992 – present
- Rank: Colonel
- Conflicts: Internal conflict in Myanmar: Muse offensive; Operation 1027

Tar Bone Kyaw (Burmese: တာဘုန်းကျော်) is a senior Ta'ang (Palaung) military and political leader in Shan State, Myanmar (Burma). He is currently the secretary general of the Palaung State Liberation Front (PSLF), and the second-in-command of its armed wing, the Ta'ang National Liberation Army (TNLA).

== Military career ==
Tar Bone Kyaw served in the Palaung State Liberation Organization/Army (PSLO/A) until they signed a ceasefire agreement with the government in 1991. After the PSLO/A disbanded, Tar Bone Kyaw, together with another Ta'ang leader, Tar Aik Bong, founded the TNLA alongside the PSLF to continue fighting for the self-determination of the Ta'ang people.

When Operation 1027 was launched on 27 October 2023, Tar Bone Kyaw told Agence France-Presse that the Three Brotherhood Alliance would end their ceasefire with the military junta.
