= PSLF =

PSLF may refer to:

- Palaung State Liberation Front
- Public Service Loan Forgiveness
