= Palaung State Liberation Front =

Political party in Myanmar

Palaung State Liberation Front ပလောင်ပြည်နယ်လွတ်မြောက်ရေးတပ်ဦး
- Chairman: Tar Aik Bong
- Secretary-General: Tar Bone Kyaw
- Founded: 12 January 1992
- Headquarters: Namhsan, Shan State, Myanmar
- Armed wing: Ta'ang National Liberation Army
- Ideology: Palaung interests Federalism
- Colors: Green, Red, White
- Slogan: Peace - Equality - Justice - Prosperity

Party flag

Website
- Official website

The Palaung State Liberation Front (Burmese: ပလောင်ပြည်နယ်လွတ်မြောက်ရေးတပ်ဦး; abbreviated PSLF) is a political organization and armed group in Myanmar. Its armed wing is the Ta'ang National Liberation Army (TNLA).

== History ==
The PSLF has its origins in the Palaung National Front (PNF), a Ta’ang armed group founded in 1963. In 1976, the PNF leader Mai Kwan Tong broke away with the support of the Kachin Independence Organisation (KIO) and formed the Palaung State Liberation Organisation/Palaung State Liberation Army (PSLO/PSLA), which quickly upstaged the PNF. The PSLA then waged a guerrilla war against the armed forces of the Socialist Republic of the Union of Burma. In the late 1980s, the group was weakened by the introduction of new counter-insurgency tactics and the signing of a ceasefire agreement by the KIO 4th Brigade, its longtime ally, which became the Kachin Defence Army and stopped supplying it with weapons. On 27 April 1991, the PSLA agreed to sign a ceasefire with the State Law and Order Restoration Council. In reaction, several of its members based at the headquarters of the Karen National Union in Manerplaw, on the Thailand-Myanmar border, rejected the decision of their mother organization and on 12 January 1992 formed the Palaung State Liberation Front (PSLF) under Mai Tin Moung's leadership. In the subsequent years, the PSLO progressively lost its influence, and in 2005 the regime forced it to disarm and demobilize. Many dissatisfied rank-and-file members of the PSLO then joined the PSLF and were trained by the KIA’s 3rd and 4th Brigades in Laiza.

In October 2009, the PSLF held its 3rd congress and its leaders Tar Aik Bong and Tar Bone Kyaw announced the creation of the Ta'ang National Liberation Army (TNLA) as the armed wing of the PSLF. The TNLA then started operating in Ta'ang populated areas of northern Shan State and engaging in occasional clashes with the Tatmadaw. On 9 November 2012, it held an unofficial meeting with the junta's negotiating body, the Union Peace-making Work Committee, but contacts were not further developed. The PSLF/TNLA subsequently did not take part in peace negotiations with the central government partly because of their lack of confidence in the latter's ability to control the army's actions. It was not a signatory of the Nationwide Ceasefire Agreement in 2015 but joined the UWSA-led Federal Political Negotiation and Consultative Committee. In 2016, it joined the Northern Alliance along with the Arakan Army (AA), the Kachin Independence Army (KIA) and the Myanmar National Democratic Alliance Army (MNDAA). In 2019, the AA, the MNDAA and the PSLF/TNLA strengthened their military cooperation by founding the Three Brotherhood Alliance.

Following the 2021 coup d'état the PSLF/NLA initially avoided conflict with junta troops and took advantage of the drop in fighting to boost its governance capacities in northern Shan State. However, he group is known to have "engaged indirectly with the NUG and provided support to PDFs and anti-military forces, even if mostly covertly". In December 2023, the PSLF/NLA took control of the Pa Laung Self-Administered Zone following the capture of the towns of Namhsan and Mantong as part of Operation 1027 during the current Myanmar civil war.

On 15 April 2026, the PSLF congratulated Min Aung Hlaing and the Union Government of Myanmar for the "formation of a new civilian government." It triggered widespread backlash on social media and accusations of betraying the ideals of the Spring Revolution.

== Structure ==
Although in theory the TNLA is supposed to simply be the defense department of the PSLF, in practice “there is little separation between the two" and "most PSLF officials are seconded from the armed wing".

In 2013, the PSLF/TNLA started to organize their armed forces across Ta’ang areas in five regular battalions, plus one dedicated to headquarters-defence and special forces. The number of battalions has been increased to 7 in 2013 and to 21 in 2015, divided into 3 brigades and supervised by two tactical operation commands. In 2024, Tar Hod Plarng, TNLA’s commander-in-chief, claimed that the group had now "seven brigades and more than 30 battalions.”

The PSLF/TNLA recruits primarily through a conscription policy that obliges each household in areas under their control to provide at least one male recruit. Those with many sons often have to provide two. The group has also been accused of enlisting child soldiers.

== Governance ==
The PSLF/TNLA is known for their opposition to drug trade and drug use, which they see as they see it as a health disaster for the local population, conducting operations where they actively destroy poppy fields, heroin refineries and meth labs. The TNLA claims that they arrest opium smugglers regularly and the narcotics seized are publicly burned on special occasions to deter drug trade. In August 2012, a PSLF Central Committee meeting set up a 5 year plan for the eradication of drugs and in 2014 the group claimed to have been “able to destroy more than 1,000 acres of opium farms in Ta’ang regions” in two years. The group regularly detains drug users and send them by to “detention centres” in order to cut them off from their addictions. They also try to discourage local farmers from continuing to grow poppy by offering them crop substitution programs and interest-free micro-financing.

In the areas they control, the PSLF has set up a bureaucracy of 1,500 staff, divided into thirteen departments. Many of these lower-ranking administrators are members of the junta's administrative apparatus that were assimilated by the PSLF/TNLA as they took control of their villages. This administrative network comprises "a central office, five district-level offices, eighteen offices at the township level and many more at the village-tract level". The PSLF/TNLA has set up their own police force since 2018 to maintain public order. The group also operates a parallel justice system with dedicated courts and prisons by recruiting civil servants and lawyers who sought refuge in their territory after defecting from the junta. In June 2023, the PSLF/TNLA announced that they would establish forest reserve areas to prevent deforestation and preserving local species.

In terms of education, the PSLF/TNLA has set up their own education system in partnership with local civil society groups and NUG workers, under the umbrella of the Ta’ang National Education Committee (TNEC). In 2023, the committee said it ran more than 420 schools, providing education to around 25,000 students.

The PSLF/TNLA largely generates revenue through taxes on the transportation of goods and people. Another important financing source of the group is the payment of fees by Chinese contractors conducting infrastructure projects in the region in exchange for ensuring their free access and safety. The PSLF/TNLA has also been accused of making money from taxing the local drug market, despite its anti-drug stance. Resistance on the part of certain inhabitants to pay taxes to the group have led its members to kidnap resisters and detain them until a ransom is paid.

== Armed conflict ==
Since its creation the PSLF/TNLA has been frequently engaged in clashes with local armed militias established by the State Peace and Development Council junta, that are often involved in drug trafficking.

From 2009 to 2011, more aggressive attempts by the Tatmadaw to subordinate groups in the region led to an increase in direct clashes with the TNLA, as well as with the KIA and the MNDAA. Fighting between the TNLA and government troops then reached a new high in 2013 and 2014, leading to the death of 200 people and the displacement of more than 4,000 inhabitants. In November 2016, Northern Alliance forces launched coordinated attacks on military targets in northern Shan State and briefly took control of a portion of the Mandalay-Muse Highway. In November 2017, the TNLA attacked two Burma Army bases in Namhsan.

After joining the Nationwide Ceasefire Agreement in October 2015, the RCSS/Shan State Army-South began expanding its operations towards the China border, thus encroaching on territories controlled by the PSLF/TNLA. Hostilies between the two groups broke out in November 2015 after RCSS forces ambushed TNLA soldiers near Namkham. The two groups engaged in regular skirmishes in the following years. In late 2020, fighting escalated again. In 2021, the TNLA, in cooperation with the Shan State Progress Party (SSPP), managed to register gains against RCSS troops, forcing them to withdraw south of the Mandalay-Muse Highway before pushing them back to their strongholds near the Thailand-Myanmar border.

== Alliances ==
The PSLF/TNLA has long been allied with the KIO/KIA, with which it maintains close ties and cooperates militarily. But recently the group has increasingly turned toward the SSPP, which fought alongside it against the RCSS, as well as the UWSA, which supplies it with weapons. In May 2018, the PSLF/TNLA opened its first liaison office in Panghsang, the de facto capital of Wa State. This led to a deterioration in relations with the KIA, coupled with mutual accusations of mistreatment of the local population. Tensions with the SSPP over the control and administration of territories liberated from the junta have also arisen.
