= Muse offensive =

2016 rebel offensive in Shan State, Myanmar

- Part of the Myanmar conflict
Date	20 November – 4 December 2016 (2 weeks)
Location	Muse Township, Shan State, Myanmar
Result	Myanmar government victory
Territorial changes	Mong Ko is captured by the Northern Alliance on 25 November 2016 but retaken by the Myanmar Army on 4 December 2016.

Belligerents
Myanmar	Northern Alliance

Units involved
Tatmadaw: Myanmar Army; Northeastern Command; Myanmar Air Force; Myanmar Police Force; Border Guard Police	Arakan Army; Kachin Independence Army; Myanmar National Democratic Alliance Army; Ta'ang National Liberation Army; 5th Brigade

Casualties and losses
- 16–31 killed 51 wounded 2,600 internally displaced 3,000 fled to China

The Muse offensive, also known as the Mong Ko offensive, was a joint military operation by members of the Northern Alliance, consisting of the Arakan Army (AA), the Kachin Independence Army (KIA), the Myanmar National Democratic Alliance Army (MNDAA) and the Ta'ang National Liberation Army (TNLA). The groups targeted towns and border posts along the China–Myanmar border in Muse Township, Myanmar.

== Timeline ==
On the morning of 20 November 2016, MNDAA and Arakan Army troops attacked the town of Mong Ko at 3:00 am (MMT), KIA troops attacked the town of Pang Sai at 6:00 am, and two battalions of the TNLA's 5th Brigade attacked border police and army posts in Muse Township at 8:00 am. Eight people were killed in the attack—one soldier, three policemen and 4 civilians—whilst 26 others were wounded. The Myanmar Army responded to the attacks by shelling insurgent bases in Muse Township, and the Myanmar Air Force began launching more airstrikes in the area as well, resulting in several civilian casualties.

Local charities and aid groups reported that 2,000 to 3,000 internally displaced civilians fled to nearby monasteries in Muse Township following the clashes. After fighting had ceased in the town of Muse on 23 November 2016, over 800 residents returned under the security of the Myanmar Army and local militias. However, some residents remained fearful and contradicted official reports that the fighting had ended, saying that they could still hear gunfire in the town.

The Northern Alliance claimed complete control of Mong Ko on 25 November 2016; however, the Myanmar Army recaptured the town on 4 December 2016, after Northern Alliance troops withdrew to avoid civilian casualties from airstrikes by the Myanmar Air Force.

== Aftermath ==
On 30 November 2016, a total of 16 people had died from the conflict, 51 had been wounded, 2,600 had been internally displaced, and 3,000 had fled to China. The Uppsala Conflict Data Program recorded 31 deaths: 10 combatants and 21 civilians.

The violence severely reduced cross-border trade in the area between China and Myanmar, damaging the local economy that formerly saw $10 million USD worth of goods pass the border daily.

State Counsellor of Myanmar Aung San Suu Kyi made a statement on 23 November 2016, urging the Northern Alliance to cease hostilities and to sign the Nationwide Ceasefire Agreement (NCA). A spokesperson for the TNLA later blamed the government for the fighting and for subsequent failed peace arrangements, citing the exclusion of the KIA from individual meetings as a deterrent for the Northern Alliance.
