= Operation 1027 =

2023–present anti-junta military operation in Myanmar

- Part of the Myanmar civil war
- Map as of July 2024 (not including gains made by anti-SAC forces before 27 October) Gains made by anti-SAC forces For a detailed accurate up-to-date map, see here
Date	27 October 2023 – present (2 years, 4 months and 4 days)
Location	Shan State; Mandalay Region; Sagaing Region; Chin State; Rakhine State; Bangladesh–Myanmar border China–Myanmar border India–Myanmar border
Status	Ongoing: Haigeng ceasefire from 11 January–25 June (Note: The ceasefire applied only to Northern Shan State; military operations elsewhere have continued.); Bai Suocheng and other leaders of Kokang Autonomous Region arrested
Territorial changes	Anti-SAC forces capture 42 towns and 36+ strategic hilltop outposts/major command centers (23 towns and 24+ major command centers captured by Three Brotherhood Alliance)

Belligerents
State Administration Council: Border Guard Force 1006 (Kokang BGF); Shan State Army – North	Three Brotherhood Alliance: Arakan Army; Myanmar National Democratic Alliance Army; Ta'ang National Liberation Army Communist Party of Burma other anti-SAC forces

Commanders and leaders
Brig. Gen. Tun Tun Myint (surrendered) (Note: Surrendered to the MNDAA along with five other Tatmadaw brigadiers: Moe Kyaw Thu, Zaw Myo Win, Aye Min Oo, Thaw Zin Oo, and Aung Zaw Lin.); Brig. Gen. Kyaw Swar Oo; Brig. Gen. Aung Kyaw Lwin †; Brig. Gen. Zin Myo Swe (POW); Brig. Gen. Zaw Min Tun (POW); Brig. Min Min Tun (POW); Col. Min Min Tun †; Col. Myo Min Ko Ko †; Brig. Gen. Thant Htin Soe (POW); Brig. Gen. Tin Tun Aung †; Col. Hla Min †; Maj. Gen. Soe Tint (POW); Brig. Gen. Myo Min Htwe (POW); Col. Wei Huairen (arrested); Ming Xuechang x; Bai Suocheng (arrested); Colonel Sai Su; Major Sai Hpone Han	Twan Mrat Naing; Nyo Twan Awng; Pheung Daxun; Ni Ni Kyaw; Tar Aik Bong; Tar Bone Kyaw

Units involved
Tatmadaw; Myanmar Army; Northeastern Command; Myanmar Air Force; Myanmar Police Force; Border Guard Police; Pyusawhti militias; Kokang Big Four Families (remnants of their militias)	Three Brotherhood Alliance; Arakan Army; Myanmar National Democratic Alliance Army; Ta'ang National Liberation Army; Other anti-junta forces: Kachin Independence Army; Bamar People's Liberation Army; Mandalay-People's Defence Force; People's Liberation Army; Karenni Nationalities Defence Force; All Burma Students' Democratic Front

Strength
Unknown	20,000

Casualties and losses
3,783 killed, 810 wounded, 967 captured, 6,891 surrendered (Northern Shan State Theatre, per the MNDAA); 1,500+ casualties (as of 13 Nov.; per The Irrawaddy); 298 killed (as of 8 Nov.; per the military); 650+ captured (as of 19 Dec.; per The Irrawaddy); 1 FTC-2000G jet trainer shot down 1 Mil Mi-17 helicopter shot down	600+ MNDAA fighters killed, 1,000+ MNDAA fighters wounded (Northern Shan State Theatre, per the MNDAA), other rebel groups unknown
- 363 civilians killed, 461 injured (as of 5 Jan.); 335,000 displaced (before 2024); 150,000+ displaced (since 2024)

Operation 1027 (Burmese: ၁၀၂၇ စစ်ဆင်ရေး, MLCTS: 1027 cac hcang re:, Burmese pronunciation: [tə.sʰɛ̀ n̥ə.sʰɛ̼.kʰóʊɴ sɪʔ.sʰɪɴ.jè]) is an ongoing military offensive conducted by the Three Brotherhood Alliance, a military coalition composed of three ethnic armed organisations in Myanmar: the Arakan Army (AA), Myanmar National Democratic Alliance Army (MNDAA), and Ta'ang National Liberation Army (TNLA), allied with other rebel forces in the country, against the Tatmadaw, Myanmar's ruling military junta.

The joint rebel forces launched simultaneous attacks on multiple targets in northern Shan State, targeting the Myanmar Army, the Myanmar Police Force, and other military installations along the border with China. The Brotherhood Alliance successfully took control of the strategically important Kokang Self-Administered Zone (SAZ) following their decisive victory in the Battle of Laukkai. The offensive has sparked rebel offensives outside Shan State and across the country, including the Rakhine Offensive in Rakhine State, Operations 1107 and 1111 in Kayah State, and other offensives in Sagaing Region and Chin State. Resistance forces across the country captured scores of towns, with the Brotherhood Alliance claiming by 28 November 2023 to have captured over 220 junta positions.

The surprise offensive's series of victories against the military regime have led observers to call it "by far the most difficult moment" for the regime "since the early days of the coup." The regime has been unable to effectively respond to the wave of losses it has suffered, resorting to indiscriminate shelling and airstrikes to retaliate. The sides agreed to a ceasefire in December, but the agreement quickly collapsed. The sides agreed to another China-brokered ceasefire for northern Shan State on January 11, but following skirmishes and allegations that the regime had conducted airstrikes in violation of the ceasefire's terms, the ceasefire broke down in June as rebel forces resumed offensive actions.

== Background ==
=== Ethnic rebellion and conflicts ===
The major rebel coalition that has fought during Operation 1027 is the Three Brotherhood Alliance, which is composed of three established anti-government ethnic armed organizations (EAOs). One of these is the Myanmar National Democratic Alliance Army (MNDAA), an ethnic armed organization whose members are of the Kokang Chinese ethnicity. The other two members of the group are the Ta'ang National Liberation Army (TNLA), which operates in Shan State, and the Arakan Army that operates in Rakhine State.

During Myanmar's conflict, the military has struggled to enforce its power over ethnic minority regions, as it mainly recruits from the Bamar majority population who are mostly unfamiliar with the language and landscapes of ethnic areas. To compensate, it has made deals with some local militias in which the militias agree to be subordinated as Border Guard Forces (BGFs), but have retained large amounts of autonomy. In exchange for following the military's orders "to some extent", the leadership of these groups are able to run businesses.

Following two years of persistent efforts across various regions of Myanmar, the Myanmar military found its resources increasingly strained by late 2023. On 9 October 2023, the military attacked Mung Lai Hkyet base, three kilometers north of Laiza, the headquarters of the Kachin Independence Army (KIA), a close ally of the Brotherhood Alliance. KIA Lieutenant General Gun Maw stated in an interview that the conflict had been brought to the KIA's doorstep, necessitating a military counteraction.

=== Cyber-scamming in Myanmar since 2021 ===
Due to the corruption within the Tatmadaw and the lack of their control on the borderland, many armed groups on both sides began in the fields of mining and trade, but moved towards more illicit business over time, like gambling and cyber-scamming, in which the latter gained the most attention. The cyber-scamming industry has particularly plagued Myanmar since the February 2021 coup. The military junta has worked with Chinese criminal gangs to traffic over 120,000 people into the country. These fraud factories have earned billions of dollars in revenue for the junta and the gangs that operate them. Criminal gangs have trafficked Chinese nationals and others including as Indian, Cambodian, Vietnamese, Thai, Malaysian, Tajik, Filipino and Kyrgyz people through various other Southeast Asian and Central Asian gangs.

In Northern Myanmar, they were forced to work in inhumane and degrading conditions. According to Vietnamese charity organization Blue Dragon, trafficking victims were forced to work in scamming operations. They were held against their will and forced to sell their organs if they failed to meet quotas. The cyber-scamming militias have been a significant disturbance to Myanmar's neighbor China in particular, from where individuals have been led to Myanmar under false pretenses and then forced into fraud factories. As a result, China has exerted pressure on the regime to end the practice, and had been actively working with the Three Brotherhood Alliance to extricate individuals with pending Chinese warrants. According to an emergency meeting of the National Defense and Security council, the junta leader Min Aung Hlaing noted that long-standing tensions and scam call centers along the border were exacerbated by Chinese investment.

On 20 October 2023, a rescue attempt by prisoners at a cyber-scamming facility in Laukkai within the Kokang SAZ resulted in a massacre in which fleeing prisoners were killed by guards. The facility and the paramilitary forces were under the control of cybercrime ringleader and former pro-military member of parliament Ming Xuechang. Reports allege that upwards of 80 people were killed, and that four undercover Chinese police officers had been buried alive. This incident has been credited with forcing China to tacitly allow anti-junta forces to begin Operation 1027.

== Timeline ==
=== Operation 1027 (Phase 1) ===
==== October 2023 ====
===== 27 October =====
The Three Brotherhood Alliance released a joint statement declaring the start of Operation 1027 on 27 October 2023. The alliance had the combined capability to draw on 15,000 troops. The statement detailed the primary objectives of the operation, being to:

- Safeguard the lives of civilians
- Assert [their] right to self-defence
- Maintain control over [their] territory
- Respond resolutely to ongoing artillery attacks and airstrikes perpetrated by the State Administration Council
- [Eradicate] the oppressive military rule
- [Combat] the widespread online gambling fraud that has plagued Myanmar, particularly along the China–Myanmar border

At 4:00 am, the MNDAA attacked military bases in Kokang and reported that junta forces had been killed and some captured along with their weapons. Reports indicated that the TNLA captured junta's 13 Mile Camp and Microweave Camp on the Namhkam-Namphatka Road in Namhkam Township. The MNDAA reportedly had seized control of the town of Chinshwehaw and blocked the Lashio-Muse Highway and Lashio-Chin Shwe Haw Road to prevent the regime from bringing reinforcements along these routes.

The regime responded with aerial bombardments and heavy shelling. The SAC's spokesperson Major General Zaw Min Tun confirmed that fighting had occurred near Hsenwi and some security police stations and militia stations were destroyed. He also admitted that some security forces personnel were killed and injured, but did not provide an exact number. According to Al Jazeera, the German news agency Deutsche Presse-Agentur reported that about 20 soldiers were killed in an attack on one of the customs offices in Chinshwehaw. A member of Luakkiang's police force reported that 17 police officers were killed after the MNDAA attacked checkpoints. The Bamar People's Liberation Army (BPLA) stated it was involved in the operation alongside the Brotherhood Alliance, which has been training BPLA fighters.

The AA engaged in multiple skirmishes with junta forces in Htigyaing Township, a township bordering northwestern Shan State in Sagaing Region. The AA claimed multiple junta casualties after clashes south of Mt. Mawkun.

Nine rebel groups raided a military checkpoint on the Taungtha-Myingyan road in the Taungtha Township. The groups used drones to bomb the base before their assault, and claimed to have killed 20 junta troops. Other rebels ambushed a junta convoy bringing reinforcements, but were forced to withdraw.

A child and a woman were killed and at least 5 others were injured due to an artillery strike on Namphatka village in Kutkai Township.

===== 28 October =====
According to rebel sources, the MNDAA ambushed junta soldiers coming from Hopang and seized three junta outposts — two of them near the China-Myanmar border in the town of Mong Ko. They also claimed to have defeated paratroopers dropped near Chinshwehaw and captured paradropped weaponry. The TNLA claimed to have seized three outposts in Namhkam Township and two outposts in the Lashio area. Junta spokespeople acknowledged losing certain outposts and expressed their desire for peace and stability.

About 600 IDPs from Lashio were displaced by heavy weapons and gunfire through the 27th and 28th. Clashes disrupted roads and villages near Lashio, including the Hopaik toll gate on the Lashio-Muse Highway. However, Lashio itself remained mostly untouched. The Mandalay-Lashio road and the Hopaik Toll Gate, which saw fighting on the 27th, returned to normal on the 28th. Fighting, however, continued to occur further away from Mandalay towards Kyaukme, Hsenwi, and Kutkai.

===== 29 October =====
Clashes in Htigyaing Township continued into 29 October with the junta dispatching air force planes to engage in the area.

A TNLA-led force, alongside Mandalay PDF forces, attacked a junta camp in Kyaukkyan village, three miles from the town of Nawnghkio. The junta retreated from the camp, moving towards a missile site on the Nawnghkio-Yetsawk road. At the same time, another rebel contingent attacked and captured junta personnel on the Goktwin Bridge on the Nawnghkio-Kyaukme road near the Goteik viaduct cutting off access along the Mandalay-Muse Union Highway. Other TNLA and PDF groups attacked a military unit near Ahtet Nyaung Kone, in Mogok Township.

===== 30 October =====
Five clashes continued through northern Shan State, including at an outpost in Hsenwi Township and the Hsenwi General Administration Department office. The Brotherhood Alliance further claimed to have captured junta forces in Mongli village, Hsenwi Township, and to have surrounded Nawnghkio Township. By the end of 30 October, the Brotherhood Alliance claimed to have captured a total of 67 army outposts and taken 34 junta personnel as prisoners. The rebel forces were also able to capture two Ukrainian-made MT-LBMSh armored vehicles from the Junta. Four WMA301 105mm fire support vehicles were also destroyed by rebel groups in several days' fighting. The TNLA and MDY-PDF were also able to capture areas around the town of Nawnghkio.

A spokesperson for the Kachin Independence Army (KIA) stated that the group was collaborating with the Brotherhood Alliance as part of the operation, and reaffirmed their shared goal of toppling the military junta. The Alliance also announced that they were cooperating with the KIA in the battles in Sagaing.

===== 31 October =====
At around 5 am, joint KIA and AA forces attacked Maliyan camp near the Kantawyang junta base on the Myitkyina-Bhamo road in Waingmaw Township. The battle involved airstrikes from the Myanmar Air Force which reportedly destroyed six houses after attacks aimed towards Aungja. The junta lost control of the base to rebel forces in the morning. Heavy weapon firing and aerial attacks continued in the area, including strikes targeted towards Laiza, the headquarters of the KIA. During the attack, the commander of the junta's 387th battalion was killed. The Tatmadaw's 71st Infantry Battalion reportedly arrested around 20 refugees to use as human shields and allegedly mutilated seven of them in Tabayin.

==== November 2023 ====
===== 1 November =====
On 1 November, the Junta arrested around 200 foreign workers to use as human shields at the front line of Laukkai.

A SAC convoy advances on Nawnghkio (30 October 2023)

===== 2 November =====
By 2 November 92 junta bases and four towns had been captured by the Brotherhood Alliance and its allies. It was also reported that 14 civilians had been killed by junta shelling and airstrikes since the start of the operation. The Alliance claimed to be in "complete control" of both Chinshwehaw and Hsenwi. The Three Brotherhood Alliance also imposed a siege on Nawngkhio, blocking junta troops from all of northern Shan. Peng Hseng, a border town east of Muse, also came under alliance control.

===== 3 November =====
Rebel forces occupied Kawlin's police station on 3 November after simultaneous attacks on at least 10 junta positions in eight townships across Sagaing and Magwe regions as part of the operation. The NUG Ministry of Defense said that at least six junta camps and police stations had been seized by rebel forces in northern Sagaing in Kawlin, Kantbalu, Kyunhla, Wuntho, Kalewa, Kale, Homalin and Tamu townships.

===== 4 November =====
By 4 November 106 junta bases and four towns has been captured by the anti-junta alliance in the states of Shan and Kachin. Myanmar's junta launched several airstrikes in Kawlin, Sagaing Region, as rebel forces attacked regime strongholds, according to residents. The KIA, AA and ABSDF are fighting alongside PDF and LPDF forces in the Sagaing-Magway front as part of the operation.

During the conflict, a shell landed on the Chinese border, causing the death of one Chinese citizen and multiple injuries to others.

===== 6 November =====
After assaulting Kawlin for three days, KIA, AA and PDF combined forces were finally able to capture the town. Namhkam was also taken by the TNLA. Only one junta base remains on a hill about two miles from the town. AA and MNDAA forces were also able to seize Panlong base in Kunlong Township. Brigadier General Aung Kyaw Lwin, commander of the 99th Infantry Division, was killed in the battle. It's also reported that the Junta launched daily artillery strikes and air strikes on the city of Laiza as retaliation for its massive losses.

It was reported that more than 20 civilians, including 3 children, had been killed by junta airstrikes and shelling since the beginning of the operation.

===== 7 November =====
The town of Khampat in Sagaing Region was taken by the PDF. The battle for the town started on 4 November. In three days, all the police stations and military camps were captured by the rebel forces. The town came under the complete control of the PDF forces on the morning of 7 November. KIA and Chin National Defense Force (CNDF) forces also participated in the assault. The city of Mong Ko along the China-Myanmar border was captured by the MNDAA. Mongko base, one of the most important bases in Northern Shan State, was also captured by the MNDAA. They captured ammunition and other military equipment, including an armored car.

In southeastern Kayah State, the Karenni Nationalities Defence Force launched Operation 1107 in support of Operation 1027, capturing three junta bases in Maesae Township within the day. It was the first skirmish to happen in the region since the start of the operation.

===== 8 November =====
Junta chief Min Aung Hlaing called up all military reservists to prepare for military operations after the high losses experienced in the fighting. Military doctors still studying for degrees have also been called to front-line combat. The TNLA gained control of the last remaining Tatmadaw base in Namhkam, killing 13 junta soldiers while capturing 3 others as well as 30 pieces of ammunition.

===== 9 November =====
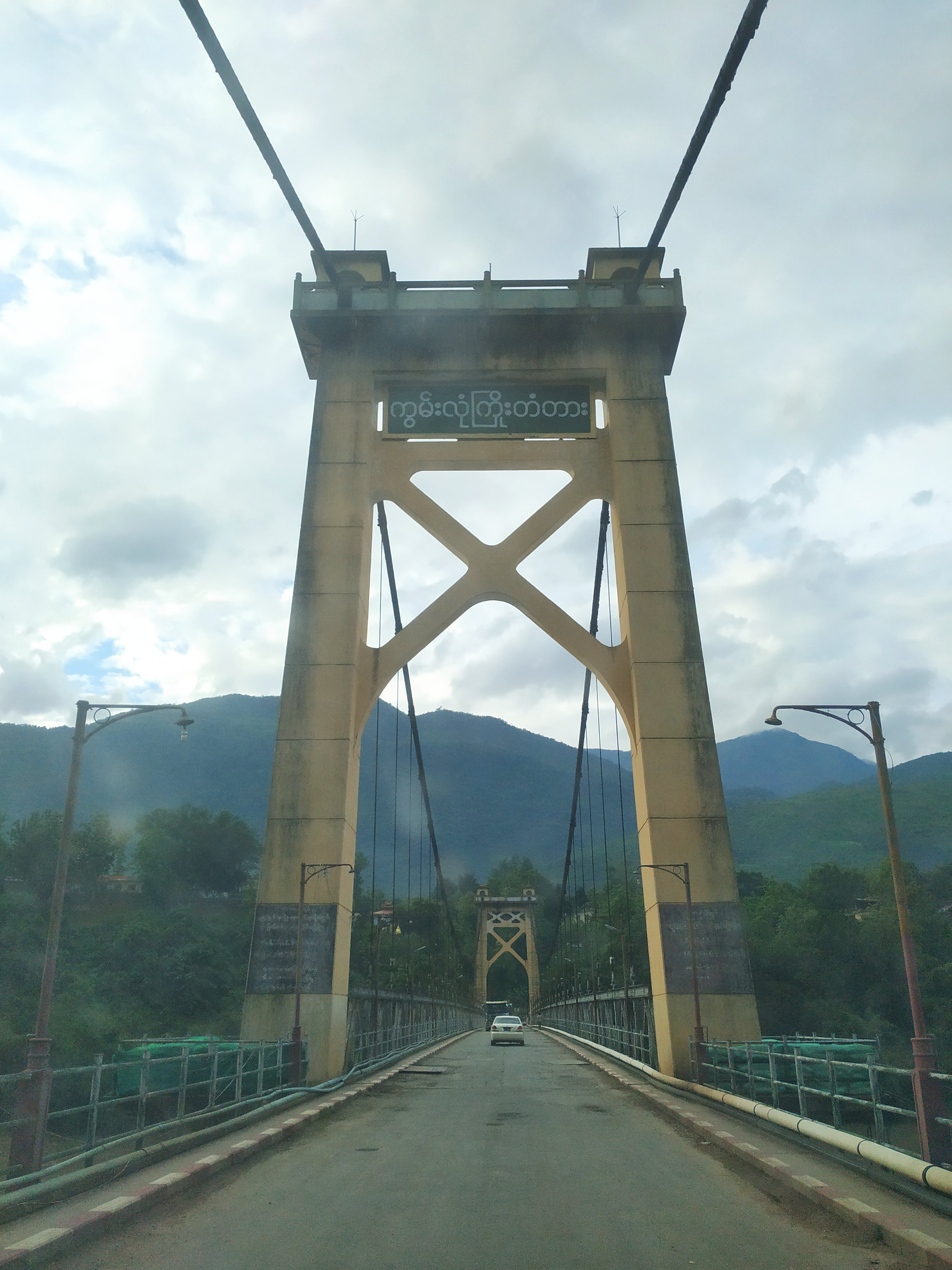
Kunlong suspension bridge

The junta lost control of the city of Kunlong. Junta forces attacked a camp manned by TNLA and MDY-PDF forces near Ommkha village near Nawnghkio with three armored cars. One of the armored cars was destroyed and captured by TNLA/MDY-PDF forces and the two remaining armored cars retreated. The KIA also captured three military bases in Hpakant Township. In Kalewa, the PDF engaged the junta in a battle in which 10 Tatmadaw soldiers were killed, and 50 weapons were seized by the rebels. The same day, the Junta summoned all its reserves into action.

===== 10–11 November =====
A junta group consisting of about 200 combatants were attacked on their way to Kawlin by local PDF forces on 10 November. The battle lasted for about three hours. The PDF claimed that they had seized about 50 firearms. The MNDAA skirmished with junta forces in Kunlong. A combined force of the PDF, KIA, AA, and ABSDF continued to assault Htigyaing. The junta forces received support from aircraft bombing the town.

On 11 November, it was reported that more than 300 junta soldiers and allied junta-aligned militia members had surrendered to rebel forces since the beginning of the operation.

===== 12 November =====
The TNLA attacked a Kyinti military base on a bridge near Hsipaw in the morning of 12 November and had completely captured it by 5:30 AM. Military bases on the western bank of the Salween River in Kunlong were taken by the MNDAA and both sides of the town came under its control. Equipment seized by the group included two D-30 howitzers, one 122mm MAM-01 MRLS, one 240mm MAM-02 MRLS, one BTR-3U armoured vehicle, one EE-9 armoured vehicle, one MT-LB armoured vehicle and several mortars. The military regime imposed martial law in Kunlong, Kutkai, Muse, Namhkan, Hsenwi, Lashio, Laukkai and Konkyan. The same day, 127 junta soldiers from the 129th Infantry Battalion stationed in Laukkai surrendered to the MNDAA within the city.

===== 13 November =====
China issued arrest warrants for junta-aligned Ming Xuechang and three other Ming family members for their involvement in online scamming operations. According to The Diplomat, this move signals China's "tacit support for the removal of the Kokang SAZ's leadership". The MNDAA was able to capture more Ukrainian-made armored vehicles. The mansion of the Ming family, in Shiyuanzi Village, Kokang SAZ, was bombed. The MNDAA denied responsibility.

The first fighting in Rakhine since the operation began took place in Rathedaung and Minbya townships, breaking an informal ceasefire that had been in place in the region and marking the beginning of the Rakhine Offensive. The AA reported that it had seized outposts and arrested some officers.

===== 14–15 November =====
On 14 November, 43 Myanmar Army soldiers attempted to flee across the border into the Indian state of Mizoram. Most of them were disarmed by the Assam Rifles and sent back to Myanmar. According to reports from the MNDAA, they had begun to attack Myanmar Army positions in Mawhtike, capturing two posts and killing 20 regime soldiers.

On 15 November, rebel forces reported that the entire 129th battalion of army forces surrendered to them in Shan State. The surrender of 127 soldiers and 134 family members would mark the largest such surrender since the conflict escalated after the 2021 coup. The Junta used air-strikes against refugees in Loikaw. MNDAA rebels captured two M-56А1 105 mm howitzers from junta force positions in Mawhtike.

The State Administration Council further announced that junta-aligned Kokang SAZ chairman Myint Swe would be temporarily replaced by Brigadier General Tun Tun Myint. Tun Tun Myint was previously the commander in charge of northern Shan State operations. The move was suggested to be in anticipation of Operation 1027 moving towards Laukkai.

The 6th light infantry battalion and 425th light infantry battalion of the junta's 66th light infantry division were severely damaged during fighting in Loikaw University, with the battalions' commander and second in command killed in both battalions despite excessive air and artillery support. The remaining 38 soldiers under the command of captain Kaung Myat Ko, the only officer left, surrendered to the KNDF.

===== 16–17 November =====
The same day, cybercrime ringleader Ming Xuechang and his family were arrested by Myanmar junta authorities and handed over to China. Ming Xuechang died in police custody, and the Consulate General of the Republic of the Union of Myanmar in Kunming claims that Ming Xuechang committed suicide. Ming Julan was later found by rebel forces and was handed over as well. On 17 November, Bai Xuoqian, former deputy commander of the MNDAA and former head of the Kokang SAZ, was stopped by the Myanmar Army when he tried to leave Kokang.

===== 18 November =====
The military launched a successful offensive to retake their Sakhan Thit Kone base in Namhkam Township, which had been captured by the TNLA the previous day. The TNLA accused the junta of using chemical weapons during their offensive by dropping bombs, which caused "dizziness, breathlessness, nausea, extreme agitation, fatigue, and low blood oxygen" among its troops. Chemical weapons are illegal under international law and their use would constitute a war crime. The TNLA said they would attempt to gather more conclusive evidence of the attack with technical and laboratory investigations.

===== 23 November =====
The MNDAA accused the junta of using chemical weapons during an airstrike on a recently captured junta base. Troops affected by the weapons reportedly suffered from dizziness and vomiting. The MNDAA warned that the junta "could launch more chemical attacks on both civilians and revolutionary forces," and said it was equipping its soldiers to protect them from further chemical attacks.

A drone attack at the Kyin San Kyawt border crossing with China destroyed over 100 cargo trucks and caused over K 30,000,000 (around US$14,000,000) in losses. A drone was used to drop bombs on junta soldiers guarding the crossing, which started fires that burned for hours and destroyed goods trapped at the crossing by the outbreak of fighting. No group claimed responsibility for the attack.

===== 24 November =====
The TNLA retook their Mine Kyat base in Lashio Township after a 28-day battle, seizing heavy equipment, including one D-30 howitzer. They had previously abandoned the base after junta airstrikes. The MNDAA and other rebel groups managed to seize four military bases in Hseni Township, northern Shan State, after six days of attacks. The rebels claimed that 16 junta soldiers were killed and 31 captured in the battle. The rebels also seized one BTR-3U armoured vehicle, two Soltam M-845P 155 mm howitzers and other weapons and ammunition from the junta bases.

Nine resistance groups jointly raided junta bases in Aung Thayar village, Sagiang Region. The People's Liberation Army of CPB, which participated in the attack, said they had killed over ten and captured seven regime troops, while seven of their own troops were injured.

===== 25 November =====
Several resistance groups launched a joint attack on junta positions in four villages: Nyaung Kaing, Thee Kone, Zee Phyu Kone, and Tal Thee Taw, with the latter two falling into resistance hands. At least 20 junta and pro-junta militia troops were killed during the attack, the groups claimed.

China announced it would be conducting live-fire military exercises on the border with Myanmar, following the attack at the Kyin San Kyawt border crossing. They said the drills would run until the 28th and aimed to test the "rapid maneuverability, border sealing and fire strike capabilities" of troops stationed in the region.

===== 26 November =====
An attack by PDFs on a junta checkpoint in the Myingyan township of Mandalay Region killed two regime soldiers, with a follow-up attack killing another. The groups also claimed to have killed eight junta troops using mines in an ambush.

The MNDAA announced that they had captured the Kyin San Kyawt border crossing in Muse District. This was the fourth such border crossing seized during the operation. The crossing was previously targeted in an attack that destroyed around 120 trucks parked at the border.

===== 27 November =====
On 27 November, the Brotherhood Alliance launched an offensive to seize the 105-Mile Trade Zone, a stretch of border in the Muse District that accounts for a major portion of trade with China. The rebel forces used drones to strike junta positions in the region, with the junta retaliating with heavy shelling and airstrikes that reportedly killed two civilians. Rebel forces seized attacked bases in Kyaukme and Laisho townships, seizing weapons. On the same day, Mandalay PDF said they had carried out a joint attack with the TNLA against a junta camp in Madaya Township, Mandalay. The group claimed that over 15 junta soldiers were killed, but that the resistance forces suffered no casualties.

On 29 November, it was reported that the MNDAA had captured the town of Konkyan in the Kokang SAZ, following the surrender of Light Infantry Battalion 125 of the Tatmadaw. A total of 186 Tatmadaw soldiers and 86 family members surrendered in Konkyan.

==== December 2023 ====
===== 1 December =====
Over the second half of November, the MNDAA encircled the town by capturing a number of junta outposts. The junta found it difficult to retain its foothold after losing Chinshwehaw, which was a key entry point into the Kokang SAZ along the main Lashio-China road. On 1 December, the MNDAA started penetrating the Tong Chain neighbourhood in southeastern Laukkai, beginning the Battle of Laukkai.

On the same day, the MNDAA ambushed a battalion of junta troops who had previously fled Konkyan on 29 November. The entire battalion was killed, with casualties numbering between a few dozen and 100+.

===== 4–13 December =====
They seized a D-30 howitzer. On 6 December, the MNDAA captured the military outpost on Four Buddhist Statues Hill immediately south of Laukkai. This was the last junta outpost between the Brotherhood Alliance and Laukkai proper.

On 7 December, the town of Monglon in Kyaukme township was seized by the TNLA.

On 10 December, Chinese authorities issued arrest warrants and offered substantial rewards for the capture of 10 key figures leading telecom fraud rings operating in the Kokang region of Myanmar's Shan State, including former Kokang region chairman Bai Xuoqian and several pro-junta Kokang militia leaders.

On 13 December, the KIA, along with the All Burma Students' Democratic Front and Indaw PDF, took the town of Maw Luu from junta forces. The junta targeted the town with airstrikes following the town's capture.

===== 15 December =====
The Ta'ang National Liberation Army seized the town of Namhsan after around two weeks of fighting. The rebels seized two D-30 howitzers and two M-56A1 howitzers from junta forces in Namhsan. The TNLA suffered approximately 200 casualties (49 killed and 145 wounded) while capturing the Sakham Thit Kone stronghold in Namhsan. At least 60 junta troops were killed and more than 150 surrendered to the TNLA. Brigadier General Min Min Tun, commander of the 101st Infantry Division of the Tatmadaw, was also captured by TNLA. The Brotherhood Alliance took control the 105-Mile Myanmar-China Trade Zone and a military base in Muse Township in Shan State, the AA rebels seized a BTR-3U armored vehicle and an MT-LB armored vehicle there.

===== 18–22 December =====
On 18 December, anti-junta forces fully gained control of Namkham and the surrounding Namhkam Township. On the same day, the Myanmar Air Force launched three airstrikes towards MNDAA troops in Hitn Par Keng, a village directly north of Laukkai after a week of respite during peace talks. On 19 December, the MNDAA gained control of the Yanlonkyaing border gate and the Border Point 125 IDP camp on the Chinese border with Nansan, Yunnan, three north of Laukkai.

The junta bombed an internally displaced persons camp in Mantong on 21 December, destroying at least 15 homes and a monastery. This bombing was part of a larger bombing operation in which the air force has bombed Mantong Township more than 180 times. TNLA captured Mantong in the evening of 22 December, completely capturing the Pa Laung Self-Administered Zone. TNLA seized one 155mm Soltam M-71 howitzer from Tatmadaw in Mantong.

===== 26–31 December =====
In Laukkai, 90 soldiers of the Tatmadaw's 55th Light Infantry Division and BGF troops reportedly surrendered to the MNDAA on 26 December, while another 90 junta troops were killed in previous fighting. On 28 December it was reported that "most" of Laukkai was now under MNDAA control, with junta forces largely abandoning the city.

On 29 December, the TNLA took control of Namtu prompting junta forces to bombard the town.

On 31 December, the TNLA seized Mongngaw town in Kyaukme township, following attacks that had begun on the 28th.

==== January 2024 ====
===== 3–7 January =====
On 3 January, the Ta’ang National Liberation Army claimed to have taken control of the town of Mongngaw in Kyaukme Township in Shan State. The Irrawaddy reported that the Ta'ang also seized a military camp in Nawnghkio Township, with junta forces launching a counterattack in an attempt to retake it.

On 5 January, the MNDAA gained full control of Laukkai, the capital of the Kokang Self-Administered Zone, following the mass surrender of the last junta forces and officials within the city. 2,389 Tatmadaw soldiers, including 6 brigadiers, and 1,601 family members surrendered to MNDAA and were deported back to Lashio. According to a junta spokesperson, the decision was made prioritizing the safety of military families. On the same day, footage appeared on social media suggesting that the United Wa State Army had taken control of Hopang, the nominal capital of the Wa Self-Administered Division, with junta forces losing control of the east bank of the Salween River.

On 7 January, the Brotherhood Alliance claimed that it had captured Kutkai and Hsenwi on midnight after seizing junta military posts in the towns, including the headquarters of the 16th Military Operations Command in Hsenwi. The capture of the towns ended sieges that had lasted since the start of the Operation. The Arakan Army captured the Taung Shay Taung and Kyittaw Taung outposts of the Tatmadaw in Rakhine State. According to reports from the Arakan Army, 200 junta soldiers surrendered and the rebels captured 2 M-56А1 howitzers.

===== 12–13 January =====
Chinese Foreign Ministry spokesperson Mao Ning replies to a query about the cease-fire at a daily press briefing

On 12 January, the Brotherhood Alliance agreed to a temporary cease-fire inside of North Shan State between the junta forces leading to the end of the operation, after peace talks between the Three Brotherhood Alliance and junta correspondents mediated by China. The peace talks took 3 days and occurred inside Kunming, China. However, the very next day, TNLA reported that the junta had broken their ceasefire agreement with airstrikes in various townships in Northern Shan, including Lashio Township and Kyaukme Township. Additionally, there were also attacks in Mogok Township in neighbouring Mandalay Region.

=== Haigeng Ceasefire ===
==== 15–24 January ====
On 21 January, the Kachin Independence Army, along with the All Burma Students' Democratic Front and local PDFs, seized the town of Mabein after a three-day siege. The KIA claimed that the junta retaliated by dropping more than 60 bombs on the town and surrounding villages. The town is 50 kilometers north of Momeik, which is also besieged by rebel forces.

The Kachin Independence Army captured the base of the Tatmadaw's 123rd Infantry Battalion in Nampaka village, Kutkai Township, thereby cutting off the access from the junta-controlled areas to the border trading city of Muse. The Kachin Independence Army captured a D-30 howitzer and an anti-aircraft gun during the battle.

==== 26–30 January ====
Fighters from the Pa-O National Liberation Army (PNLA) and the KNDF attacked the town of Hsi Hseng in Southern Shan State. The PNLA had been a signatory of the National Ceasefire Agreement, but following escalating tensions with the junta, including a skirmish at a PNLA convoy, the group ended their neutrality and declared war against the regime. The battle is the first in Southern Shan State since the operation began.

Also on 30 January, Bai Xuoqian was arrested by the junta, which transferred him along with nine other people, including his son Bai Yingcang, to China. Wei Huairen and Liu Zhengxiang were also among those handed over to China.

==== February 2024 ====
On 7 February, it was reported that the Tatmadaw counter-offensive to retake Kawlin was proceeding and that they were getting closer to the city. The Tatmadaw was supported by air. PDF formations in Kawlin said they were preparing to defend the city.

On 11 February, pro-junta media reported that the junta had recaptured Kawlin in Sagaing Region from the People's Defense Force and Kachin Independence Army. The National Unity Government President's Office spokesperson Kyaw Zaw denied that the Tatmadaw took control of Kawlin but acknowledged that it had entered the town. On 12 February, pro-NUG media acknowledged that junta forces had fully recaptured Kawlin.

Map of anti-junta gains from Phase 1 of Operation 1027 as of 19 March 2024

==== April 2024 ====
On 25 of April the Myanmar National Democratic Alliance Army executed three of their own soldiers in Laukkai after it found them guilty of murder and other crimes linked to the online scam centers in the region.

=== Operation 1027 (Phase 2) ===
==== June 2024 ====
Beginning in June, tensions began to grow in Northern Shan State. On 9 June, the TNLA accused the junta of violating the China-brokered ceasefire after the junta launched airstrikes on TNLA positions in Mongmit Township. On 13 June, the TNLA reported that junta forces had destroyed roads connecting several Three Brotherhood Alliance-held townships, possibly due to reported buildups of Alliance forces around Lashio. Junta forces also began to amass forces in towns surrounding Brotherhood Alliance-held territory, fortifying positions in Mongyai, Muse, Kyaukme, Hsipaw, Pyin Oo Lwin, and Lashio with "tens of thousands" of soldiers, leading military sources to warn residents to take cautionary safety measures.

On 18 June, junta forces bombed Hsum Hsai village, killing 2 TNLA soldiers. The next day, junta forces bombed Taungni and Shwe Nyaung Bin villages, killing 1 civilian and 2 TNLA soldiers respectively. On 23 June, the junta and Myanmar National Democratic Alliance Army clashed near Lashio. On 24 June, fighting erupted around Kyaukme, Nawnghkio Township, and Mogok Township between junta forces and the TNLA. The next day, the TNLA announced that it had restarted "anti-junta offensive operations" in Northern Shan State. Residents of Kyaukme reported that the town had been encircled by the TNLA. Tatmadaw officials also met with battalion commanders for the Shan State Progress Party (SSPP) and United Wa State Army (UWSA) on the same day, unsuccessfully attempting to bribe them to end arms sales to other ethnic armies, a bribe the SSPP and UWSA turned down.

In response to the renewed offensive, the Tatmadaw designated Pyin Oo Lwin as an "unyielding fortress", intensifying defensive measures in the town. The NUG announced that it had joined in the offensive through its People's Defense Forces, calling the attacks a "Shan Man" operation.

On 26 June, Nawnghkio was captured by PDF and TNLA forces, and most of Kyaukme also fell to rebel forces. On 27 June, TNLA forces burnt down the Kyatpyin Police Station, attempting to capture Kyatpyin to encircle junta forces in neighboring Mogok. It was also reported that the TNLA had entered eastern areas of Mogok. By 28 June, the TNLA had captured Kyaukme and continued attacking the junta bases around the town. On 29 June, the MNDAA clashed with the junta north of Lashio after the junta attempted to advance into MNDAA territory.

==== July 2024 ====
On 2 July, the MNDAA relaunched attacks against the junta's headquarters in Lashio. The TNLA joined the offensive the next day, both armies attacking four junta bases surrounding Lashio. Pro-junta Telegram channels accused the Shan State Progress Party (SSPP) of joining the offensive.

As part of Operation 1027, the Mandalay People’s Defence Force captured 14 junta positions from 25 June to 3 July throughout northern Mandalay Region. Junta forces blockaded Madaya following clashes in the northern part of Madaya Township. Resistance forces also attacked villages in Singu and Mogok Townships, halting traffic on the Mandalay-Mogok road.

On 4 July, family members of junta soldiers in Lashio were evacuated by helicopter to Naypyidaw, while thousands of civilians fled the fighting. On 5 July, the TNLA attacked an SSPP camp near Kyaukme. On 6 July, the MNDAA captured Nampawng village south of Lashio, encircling the town. After Nampawng's capture, alliance forces began launching attacks into Lashio. The TNLA again accused the junta of using chemical weapons during clashes.

On 5 July, SSA-N fighters attacked TNLA forces in Noung Pain village, Kyaukme Township. The latter faction suffered six casualties, including three officers. Three TNLA fighters escorting captured Myanmar Army troops were also ambushed, resulting in the death of a Tatmadaw POW and a TNLA captain. The TNLA alleges that the SSPP aided in the escape of Tatmadaw soldiers from Kyaukme and Hsipaw townships in exchange for transferring control of their bases. The TNLA also states that SSA-N also seized weapons from a local PDF in Kyaukme Township. The TNLA attacked an SSPP camp near Kyaukme on the same day.

On 6 July, the MNDAA captured Nampawng village south of Lashio, encircling the town, and began launching attacks into Lashio. MNDAA forces also clashed with junta forces in Mongyai Township. On the same day, it was reported that the SSPP requested help from the UWSA in "restraining" the TNLA, with the TNLA also seeking mediation via the UWSA-led FPNCC. On 8 July, the TNLA accused the SSPP of launching attacks on its soldiers and aiding junta troops in withdrawing from bases, condemning the Shan group for "disrupting" the alliance offensive.

On 11 July, the United Wa State Army (UWSA), a neutral ethnic organization that controls a large amount of territory in northeast Shan State, deployed troops to Tangyan to prevent the spread of fighting to that town. The group said it entered negotiations with the junta to take over administration of the town after the civilians asked for protection against resistance offensives. SSPP forces numbering around 1,000 occupied Mongyai, with residents claiming that clashes might break out in the town.

On 14 July, the MNDAA announced a four-day ceasefire in response to the Third Plenary Session of the CCP. However, the ceasefire was largely ignored by both sides, with the rebel groups claiming to be responding to bombing by junta forces. TNLA and SSPP leaders also met in Panghsang, Wa State, to discuss an end to clashes.

On 17 July, the Mandalay PDF claimed to have taken control of the town of Singu. It also said it captured the nearby Alpha cement factory from retreating junta forces, who burned it as they fled. Clashes intensified around the junta's 501st and 502nd Light Infantry Battalion bases in Kyaukme and near the Nattaung area.

On 18 July, the TNLA reported seizing five junta positions East of Mogok. The group also accused the junta of dropping bombs from drones into civilian areas in Mongmit and Nawnghkio. The same day, fighting was reported in Kyaukme as junta battalions unsuccessfully attempted to retake the town. Also on the 18th, the military dropped bombs onto the TNLA-occupied city of Hsenwi, killing over 20 civilians.

On 19 July, the MNDAA said it had extended a temporary ceasefire with the junta until 31 July at Beijing's request. On the same day, despite the ceasefire, junta reinforcements launched renewed attacks on Kyaukme.

On 20 July, the junta claimed that it had recaptured the town of Singu after a day of fighting with the support of the navy and air force. A spokesman for the Mandalay People’s Defense Force denied the junta's claim.

On 24 July, the TNLA announced that it had fully captured the city of Mogok after pushing out remaining junta forces that day. Residents in the city were seen welcoming the rebel forces with flowers. The Irrawaddy reported that over 150,000 people been displaced by the fighting in Shan and Mandalay and fled to Mandalay city.

On 30 July, MNDAA forces ambushed junta reinforcements attempting to reach Lashio, inflicting heavy casualties. On 31 July, TNLA forces took complete control over Mongmit after capturing the last junta in the town.

==== August 2024 ====
On 3 August, the MNDAA announced that it had seized the headquarters of the junta’s Northeastern Command base in Lashio. As a result, the rebels took full control of the city of Lashio. A few days earlier on 27 July, UWSA forces entered Lashio with the permission of both the MNDAA and junta to protect their external relations offices.

On 9 August, the 3 Brotherhood Alliance called on Northeastern Command chief Brigadier-General Soe Hlaing to surrender himself and Muse, from which he directs Northeastern Command operations. The town is the last junta stronghold in the area, and has not been attacked in Operation 1027 due to the proximity with the Chinese border.

On 10 August, TNLA forces launched an offensive against Hsipaw, capturing the town’s prison.

On 12 August, the PDF took control of the town of Tagaung following a battle that had begun the previous day.

On 19 August, the PDF captured the town of Thabeikkyin after junta troops fled from their positions. However, a military training school in Thabeikkyin Township remained under junta control. On 25 August, the TNLA and MDY-PDF completed seizing Thabeikkyin Township and brought the entirety of Thabeikkyin District under their control.

In late August, The Irrawaddy reported that multiple sources close to the military junta had learned that the military was planning a counteroffensive to retake towns lost in Shan State. Reportedly named "Operation Sin Phyu Shin," the offensive would be led by the junta's second-in-command, Soe Win. TNLA spokesperson responded by saying that high-level junta planning is divorced from the strategic situation on the ground, and that soldiers sent by the junta to the frontlines routinely desert or have no military experience. Other sources agreed that the junta had no capacity for a counteroffensive against increasingly victorious rebel forces.

On 21 August, fighting broke out at Taung Hkam, a village on the road between Nawnghkio and Lawksawk, as junta forces tried to stop the TNLA's advance south.

The armed forces of the Communist Party of Burma during the offensive around Mandalay seized land from the junta, and in the process captured almost 140 elephants due to elephant handlers entering Communist bases while escaping from the war. The general secretary of the Burmese People's Liberation Army stated their desire to protect the elephants from the black market and poaching and provided food aid to their handlers.

== Impact ==
The UNOCHA reported that as of 30 October 2023, over 6,200 individuals have been newly displaced, with around 1,000 of them seeking refuge in forests and more than 5,000 IDPs taking shelter in temporary sites, mostly religious compounds. In Kutkai township, electricity was cut off due to the destruction of power lines during the fighting, and mobile communication services have been disrupted in several townships, including Hsenwi, Kutkai, Muse, Namhkan, and Kokang Self-Administered Zone. Myanmar Now reported that according to local aid workers, over 25,000 people had been displaced by the fighting, with around half fleeing to Namtit in Wa state. As of 21 November, an estimated 335,000 people had been displaced throughout Myanmar as a result of rebel offensives, with hundreds of civilians injured and killed.

The offensive resulted in the halt of cross-border trade with China. Fighting has stopped traffic on all major trade roads to the Chinese border, and the border posts at Muse and Laukkai have been closed. Cargo has been redirected to Loi Je in Kachin State, but the town is too small to handle as much trade as the Northern Shan border, which accounts for 70% of all trade with China. The Irrawaddy estimated that the junta is losing an estimated US$423,000 per day in tax revenue from the stoppage.

As a result of the military operation, the cyber-scamming base in northern Myanmar was heavily damaged, and a large number of Chinese nationals involved were sent back to China for further screening and trial. Small numbers of Thai, Filipino, and Singaporean nationals in Kokang were also evacuated to Bangkok through the Chinese province of Yunnan.

In Rakhine State, the conflict between the regime and the Arakan Army has displaced thousands of people. The destruction has led to food shortages among the population, with people resorting to catching fish from streams to feed themselves and their families. With harvests disrupted by the fighting, food stocks have run low, and the region is reportedly "nearing starvation."

== Reactions ==
On 1 November 2023, the United Wa State Party (UWSP) declared Wa State a neutral zone after the Three Brotherhood Alliance conducted Operation 1027 against the Tatmadaw. The UWSP threatened the use of force against hypothetical anti-junta or Tatmadaw incursions via its military wing the United Wa State Army while promising to aid refugees and other displaced persons.

On 20 November 2023, supporters of the junta staged a protest in Yangon outside City Hall and the Chinese embassy, accusing China of aiding the Brotherhood Alliance and the PDF in their fight against the military regime. China was also accused by the pro-regime protestors, who are members of the Patriotic Monks Union and the Myanmar Nationalist Organization, of purchasing rare earth elements from the KIA for cheap prices.

== Analysis ==
International observers have pointed to the influential role of China as a key factor in the operation's launch, while others have cautioned against reducing the motives of the rebels to simply an extension of China's wishes. China's stance is multifaceted, driven by concerns about cyber-scam centers, the pursuit of favorable concessions from the junta on the China-Myanmar Economic Corridor, and the opportunity to gain influence with the rebels in light of evolving collaborative dynamics between NUG and EAO groups. The junta's loss of strategic control of key locations and hills in northern Shan is evidence of the unforeseen collaboration between majority Bamar PDF groups and minority EAO groups combined with widespread revolt that the junta was ill-prepared for. The Brotherhood Alliance has maintained good relations with China, allowing China to play a role in managing the conflict along China's border and along the China-Myanmar Economic Corridor. Additionally, the operation sourced arms from the United Wa State Army, a neutral EAO in Shan State whose weapons manufacturing has been historically restricted by China. Reports suggest that loosening these restrictions have made the operation possible. According to the TNLA, China also reached out for cooperation to take down the fraud group shortly before the operation.

Analysts have highlighted that the cooperation between the PDFs and EAOs during Operation 1027 is a continuation of Myanmar's Spring Revolution, countering narratives that attribute its formation to Chinese influence. This perspective is supported by the continued public support of the armed resistance, the involvement of frontline medical professionals from the Civil Disobedience Movement, and the adoption of drone warfare tactics, a strategy that has been notably utilized by the PDF. Additionally, experts underscore the autonomy and strategic motivations of the EAOs, advocating for an interpretation of the operation as a component of a larger national movement. In this context, Operation 1027 is seen not as a byproduct of external forces like Chinese intervention, but rather as a logical extension of the ongoing struggle within Myanmar.

The State Administration Council (SAC) junta believes the operation and attack to be targeted towards damaging China-Myanmar relations from its focus on disrupting the opening of a major bridge in Kunlong Township and the Union highway overland trade in general.

=== Post-1027 offensive and alliance breakdown ===
By 2026, according to the BBC, when China's interests came to the forefront, the unity of the Brotherhood Alliance has effectively weakened northern Shan State's role in the Spring Revolution; which has led to the fragmentation of Operation 1207, benefiting both China and the Myanmar military, but weakened the Spring Revolution. The AA is the only major group in active conflict with the Myanmar military among the alliance. China is said to handle AA differently due to its geographic position near the Indian Ocean and lack of direct border control.

== See also ==
- 2009 Kokang incident
- 2015 Kokang offensive
- Laiza massacre
- Muse offensive
- Operation 1111
