= Three Brotherhood Alliance =

Military alliance in Myanmar

- Founded: June 2019
- Dates active: June 2019–present
- Groups: Arakan Army; Myanmar National Democratic Alliance Army; Ta'ang National Liberation Army
- Active regions: Chin State; Shan State; Rakhine State; Bangladesh–Myanmar border China–Myanmar border
- Status: Active
- Size: 50,000+(AA) 10,000+(TNLA) 6000+(MNDAA)

The Three Brotherhood Alliance (Burmese: ညီနောင်မဟာမိတ်သုံးဖွဲ့; Chinese: 三兄弟联盟), also known as Brotherhood Alliance, is an alliance between the Arakan Army, Myanmar National Democratic Alliance Army, and the Ta'ang National Liberation Army formed in June 2019.

The group rose to prominence in 2023 in resisting the Burmese junta in the wake of the 2021 Myanmar coup d'état. The three armed groups were silent about the coup initially but released a statement reaffirming the alliance's existence in March 2021. During the Myanmar civil war, the group fought mainly in Rakhine State and northern Shan State. On October 27, 2023, the alliance launched Operation 1027, an offensive against the junta in northern Shan state.

== Background ==
In 2016, following increased tensions between the Rohingya people of Rakhine State in western Myanmar and Buddhist extremists allied with the Myanmar military, the Burmese government began a genocidal campaign to expel Rohingya civilians from Rakhine state. The tensions hit a boiling point following an attack by Arakan Rohingya Salvation Army (ARSA) militants against a Burmese police outpost. The Arakan Army, which had fought against the Tatmadaw in the early 2010s alongside the Kachin Independence Army, resumed operations in Rakhine state following the resurgence in conflict and in 2018, conducted several attacks against the Tatmadaw in Rakhine state.

The Ta'ang National Liberation Army predominantly conducted localized operations against the Tatmadaw in northern Shan State prior to the 2021 coup. Despite being created in 2009, more recent than other rebel groups in Myanmar, the TNLA received public support from Ta'ang people and military support from other rebel groups like the KIA and United Wa State Army. Prior to the coup, the TNLA clashed regularly with the Restoration Council of Shan State over control of northern Shan state.

The Myanmar National Democratic Alliance Army is an ethnic armed group representing the Kokang people in northern Myanmar. Prior to the coup, the group participated in sporadic clashes between the Tatmadaw and the TNLA, but ultimately signed a ceasefire with the Tatmadaw in 2019.

The Northern Alliance is a coalition of four rebel groups – the MNDAA, AA, TNLA, and the KIA – that was founded in 2016 to participate in peace talks with the Burmese government. In April 2017, the Northern Alliance, along with three other EAOs (the United Wa State Army, National Democratic Alliance Army, and the Shan State Army – North), formed the Federal Political Negotiation and Consultative Committee.

== Formation ==
The Three Brotherhood Alliance first arose in June 2019, during heavy fighting between the Arakan Army and the Tatmadaw in Rakhine State and MNDAA and TNLA offensives in Shan state. Initially, the name was colloquially called "Brotherhood Alliance". It was notably not joined by the KIA, which was part of government peace talks in the FPNCC. The first attacks by the 3BA were in Shan State and in Mandalay. This offensive halted in early September 2019, with the alliance releasing a statement that peace talks were held with the Burmese government in Kengtung. Further peace talks between the two parties established a one-month ceasefire lasting until October 8, 2019. The ceasefire paused further actions by the MNDAA until the 2021 coup. However, clashes continued between the AA and the Tatmadaw in Rakhine state, despite a ceasefire extension into 2020 by the 3BA.

The Keng Tung ceasefire continued through March 2020. Despite this, the Tatmadaw declared the Arakan Army to be a terrorist group on March 23. The group released another statement in May 2020, as the ceasefire extensions continued, urging the Tatmadaw to respect the ceasefire in Rakhine state. Renewed peace talks came to fruition in July 2020, with AA and the 3BA beginning peace talks with the Burmese government. The Tatmadaw and Arakan Army signed a ceasefire in November 2020, and afterwards, the group consolidated control over much of Rakhine State and acted like a de facto state. By 2021, few clashes were documented between the junta and members of the Three Brotherhood Alliance.

== Post-coup actions ==
The Three Brotherhood Alliance were one of the few rebel groups to not immediately declare war on the junta after the coup in February 2021. Because of this, the junta prioritized negotiations with the alliance in an attempt to gain support for the junta. In early March, the junta removed the Arakan Army from its list of terrorist groups in an attempt to gain support as other rebel groups began rebelling against the government. However, AA spokesman Khine Tha Khahe deplored the actions of the Tatmadaw against protesters, calling them "very cruel and unacceptable." The TNLA and MNDAA also did not register any clashes with the Tatmadaw immediately following the coup – junta forces instead pulled troops from northern Shan state to southeastern Myanmar to quell insurgents, allowing both groups (especially the TNLA) to exercise de facto control over northern Shan.

On March 29, 2021, the three groups released a statement announcing opposition of the alliance to the junta on Facebook. The alliance was the first public action against the junta by either of the three groups. In the statement, the three groups stated that the three groups would "re-evaluate the unilateral ceasefire". The ceasefire fell apart following the alliance's first attack on junta troops on April 10, 2021. In the attack, 3BA forces ambushed a police outpost in the city of Naungmon in northern Shan state, killing fourteen police officers. The Tatmadaw regained control over the police outpost an hour later, by which time the 3BA fighters had fled.

The rest of 2021 marked a time of relatively few incidents between the junta and Three Brotherhood Alliance. The MNDAA and TNLA instead used their respite to train troops and covertly aid local PDF groups in Mandalay. The 3BA also released statements condemning the junta's actions against civilians and in the battle of Thantlang. In Rakhine, the AA used the first peace in years to gain control over most of Rakhine state, declaring in August that they controlled over two-thirds of the state.

In late 2021, clashes broke out in Kokang after the MNDAA attacked the village of Ei Nie in northern Shan state. The MNDAA also catalogued 126 incidents of clashes with the Tatmadaw in November 2021, an escalation of clashes first beginning in July. Around that time, the group was gaining strength and firepower.

In December, junta troops dropped around 500 paratroopers over the border city of Namphan, which was controlled by the MNDAA. Over 100 Tatmadaw soldiers were killed in the raid, and the remaining soldiers were forced to flee. The raid marked the first major attack by the Tatmadaw on a member of the 3BA since the coup, effectively securing de facto MNDAA control over Namphan. The secretary of the TNLA, Tar Bone Kyaw, stated that the raid cemented the 3BA's position on the junta as hostile.

In February 2022, skirmishes broke out in Maungdaw Township of Rakhine, leading to a junta crackdown on AA-affiliated citizens and areas of Rakhine. In response, the AA refused participation in peace talks. Five months later in July 2022, the junta launched an airstrike on an AA base in an area administered by the Karen National Union, killing six AA fighters. In response, the AA ambushed Tatmadaw soldiers in Maungdaw, killing four. These clashes escalated throughout August to November, with 100 battles occurring in nine Rakhine townships. Thirty-six Tatmadaw outposts were destroyed, thirty-one of which were in northern Maungdaw. The Tatmadaw launched a counteroffensive in November, but with major civilian casualties. A truce was signed on November 26.

Meanwhile, the MNDAA and TNLA used the peace in 2022 to consolidate control over areas and stockpile weapons. The TNLA did not conduct any major attacks against the junta forces, but did launch small raids to show power.

In 2023, the Three Brotherhood Alliance increased their rejection of the junta by denouncing the election as a sham despite the junta promising constitutional protection for several groups. Militarily, the 3BA began increasingly supporting other armed groups such as the Karenni Nationalities Defence Force. The TNLA also launched a brief recruitment raid in May 2023 in Lashio, military controlled territory.

In July 2025, the Burmese military government took back the town of Nawnghkio in the north of Shan state, through a series of more than 560 military engagements in the region over the span of 11 months. The Three Brotherhood Alliance had ruled this town for nearly an entire year. A key difference between the Three Brotherhood Alliance and the military junta is their lack of air support, and the air superiority of the Tatmadaw has repeatedly been a strain on the Alliance's ability to hold towns after they have been conquered.

In mid-March 2026, the alliance between MNDAA and TNLA broke down over the issue of security cameras and to reopen the trade route to China. The MNDAA attacked TNLA-controlled Kutkai using drones and took the city on 16 March. On the 17th anniversary of the founding of the Arakan Army, the MNDAA and TNLA pledged to continue their friendship, as well as cooperate with the AA and to work together until the "revolutionary vision" is achieved.

== Operation 1027 ==
The Three Brotherhood Alliance launched a massive offensive in northern Shan state on October 27, 2023, in an operation dubbed Operation 1027. The operation was in response to a failed junta offensive towards the KIA-controlled town of Laiza in Kachin state, which fizzled out in early October. At the end of the failed offensive, the junta launched an airstrike that killed 29 people, mostly children. In Operation 1027, the Three Brotherhood Alliance captured the city of Chinshwehaw and destroyed dozens of junta bases in the mountains of northern Shan. Clashes also broke out in the cities of Lashio, Hsenwi, and Kutkai, the first major fighting in those cities in the war. The operation received praise and support by other rebel groups, such as PDF groups in Mandalay, the Karenni National People's Liberation Front, the People's Liberation Army, and the National Unity Government of Myanmar.
