= Tar Aik Bong =

Ta'ang military commander

Tar Aik Bhone
- Military career
- Allegiance: Ta'ang National Liberation Army
- Service years: January 1992 – present
- Rank: Lieutenant general
- Conflicts: Internal conflict in Myanmar

Tar Aik Bong (Burmese: တာအိုက်ပေါင်း) is the chairman of the Palaung State Liberation Front (PSLF) and the commander in chief of the Ta'ang National Liberation Army (TNLA). He is of Ta'ang (Palaung) descent.

== Insurgent activity ==
Tar Aik Bong joined the Palaung State Liberation Organization/Army (PSLO/A) in 1987 and, from October 1987, he was dispatched as a delegate to Karen insurgent groups. In 1991, when the PSLO/A signed a ceasefire agreement with the government, he rejected this decision and, on 12 January 1992, was one of the founders of the PSLF, alongside Tar Bone Kyaw. In 2001, he became General Secretary of the PSLF, before being named chairman of the PSLF in 2009.
