= Palaung people =

Mon-Khmer ethnic group

Palaung De'ang

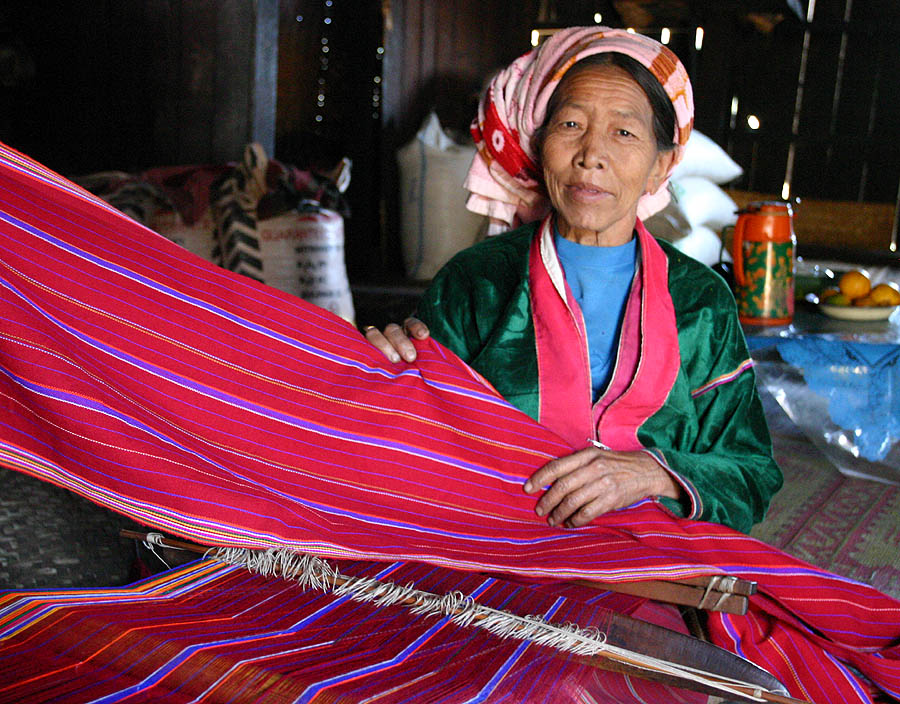
- A Ta'ang tribal woman near Kalaw, Shan State, Myanmar (Burma)

Total population
- 557,000 (est.)

Regions with significant populations
- Myanmar, smaller populations in Yunnan and Thailand

Languages
- Ta'ang

Religion
- Theravada Buddhism

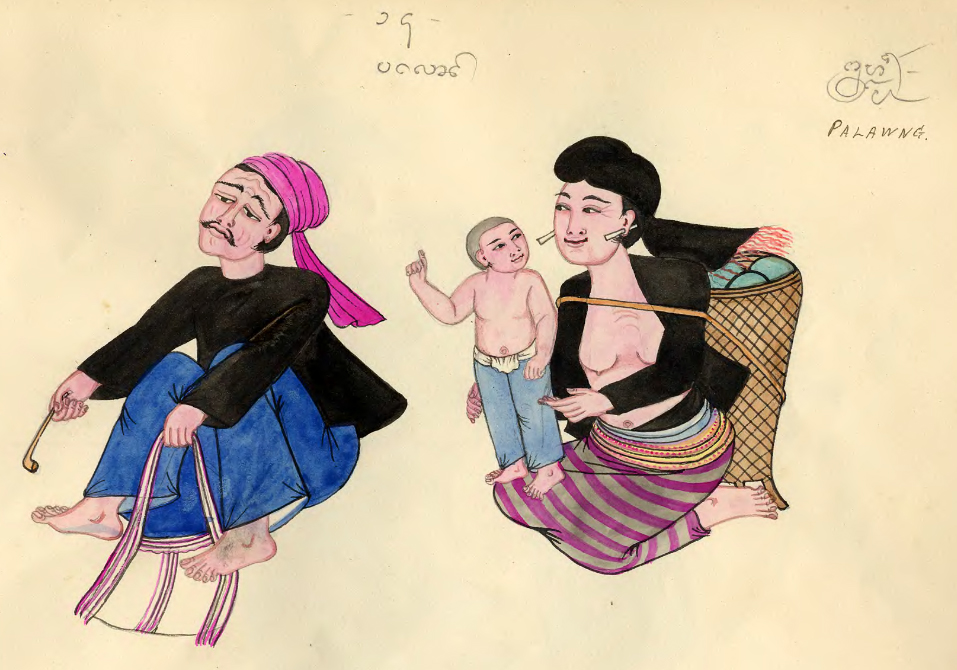
A Burmese depiction of the Palaung in the early 1900s.

The Palaung (Burmese: ပလောင်လူမျိုး [pəlàʊɰ̃ lùmjó]; Thai: ปะหล่อง; Chinese: 崩龍族, romanized: Bēnglóng Zú), Palong, or Ta'ang (Burmese: တ‌အာင်း; Chinese: 德昂族, romanized: Dé'áng Zú) are one of the ancient Austroasiatic ethnic groups found in Shan State of Myanmar, Yunnan Province of China and Northern Thailand. In China, they are referred to as the De'ang people. The majority of population lives mainly in the northern parts of northern Shan State in the Pa Laung Self-Administered Zone, with the capital at Namhsan.

The Ta'ang National Liberation Army, a Palaung armed group and the armed wing of the Palaung State Liberation Front, began fighting against the Burmese military in 1963. It entered a cease-fire agreement with the central government in April 1991, but is currently continuing the insurgency as part of the larger nationwide rebellion against the Tatmadaw junta in the Myanmar Civil War. The insurgency has become intense after TNLA actively involving in Operation 1027 which is a military offensive allied with many other revolutionary rebel forces in the country, against the Myanmar's ruling military junta. The Myanmar military is believed to have derived benefit from poppy cultivation, which has caused serious drug addiction among the local people in Palaung region.

== Groups ==
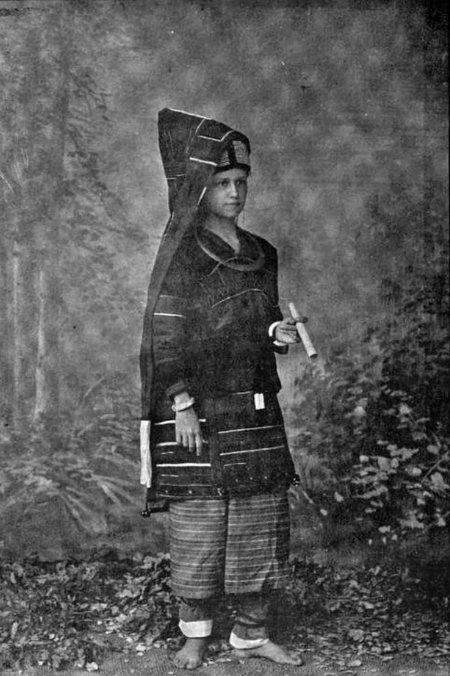
Palaung woman in British Burma.

There are three main subgroups of Palaung: the Palé, Shwe and Rumai.

The Palé, Riang, Rumai and Shwe peoples are grouped together as the De'ang ethnic nationality. The group also includes the Danau (Danaw) who may no longer have a separate identity from the Palé.

== Language ==
There are three main principal Palaung languages: Palé (Ruching), Rumai, and Shwe (Ta'ang or De'ang). Many Palaung are multilingual, speaking multiple varieties of Palaung, Burmese, Shan, and Jingpo. Use of Shan among the Palaung has declined, while younger Palaung prefer to use Burmese as a common language with speakers of other Palaung varieties. The Ta’ang Committee for Literature and Culture published the first Burmese-Ta'ang dictionary in 2012.

== Distribution ==
In Myanmar, the majority of Palaung groups of Myanmar live in northern Shan State especially in northwestern regions while some are located in the southern parts.

In Thailand, many of the Palaung in northern Thailand are refugees living in refugee camps. Many of them have fled in the past decades from Shan State to escape persecution and oppression at the hands of various Myanmar's military rulers.

In China, the De'ang (Palaung) are found in the Zhenkang County and Gengma County.

== Religion ==
The majority of Palaung are adherents of Theravada Buddhism and Buddhist temples can be found in most of their towns. At the age of ten, many children are sent to monasteries, primarily for education. Most of them return to lay life in later years.

However, some have also maintained their ethnic animist religion which is a system of beliefs based on nature spirits called nats.

== See also ==
- Palaung language
- Ta'ang National Liberation Army

== Gallery ==
Palaung village near Kyaukme, Shan State, Burma
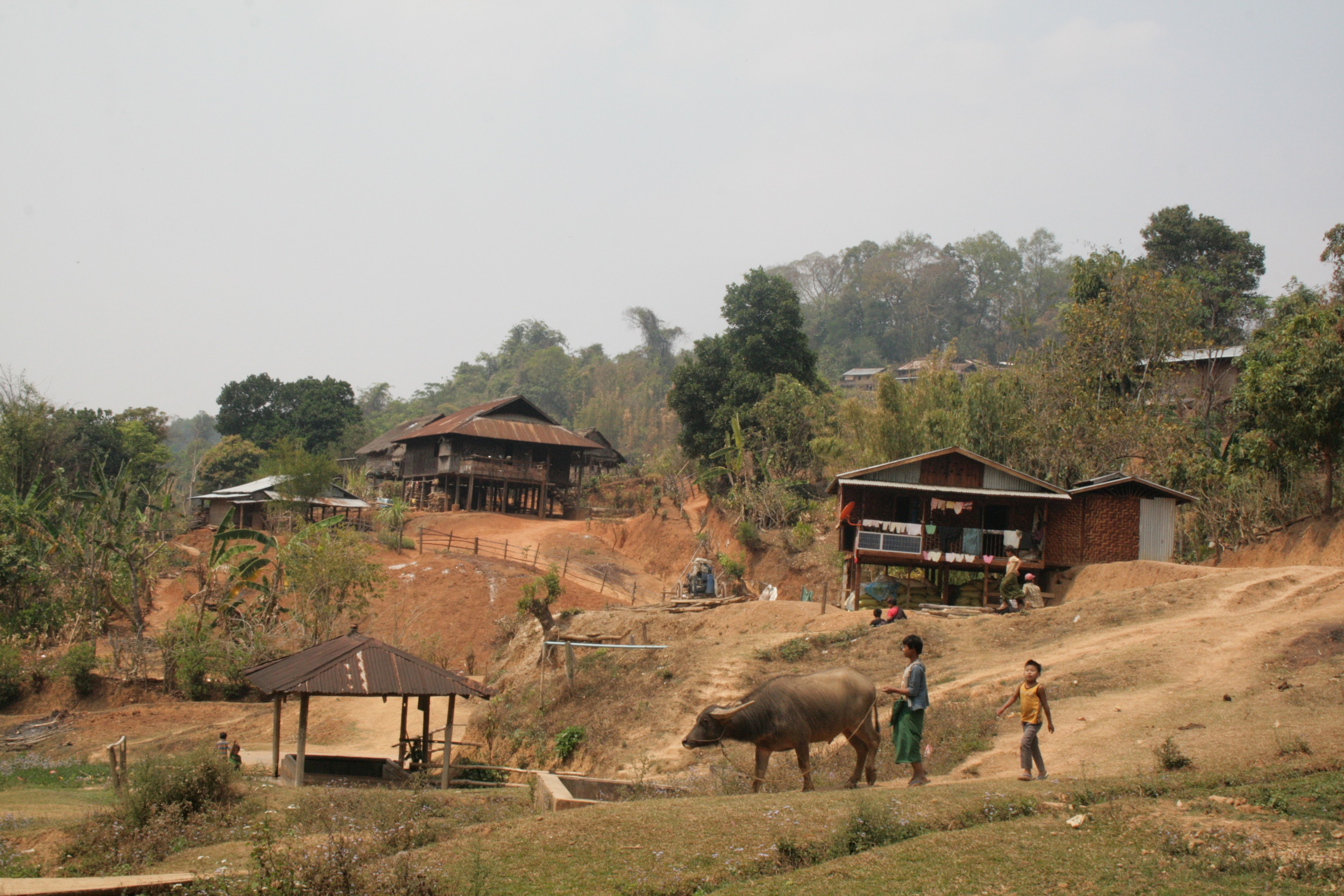

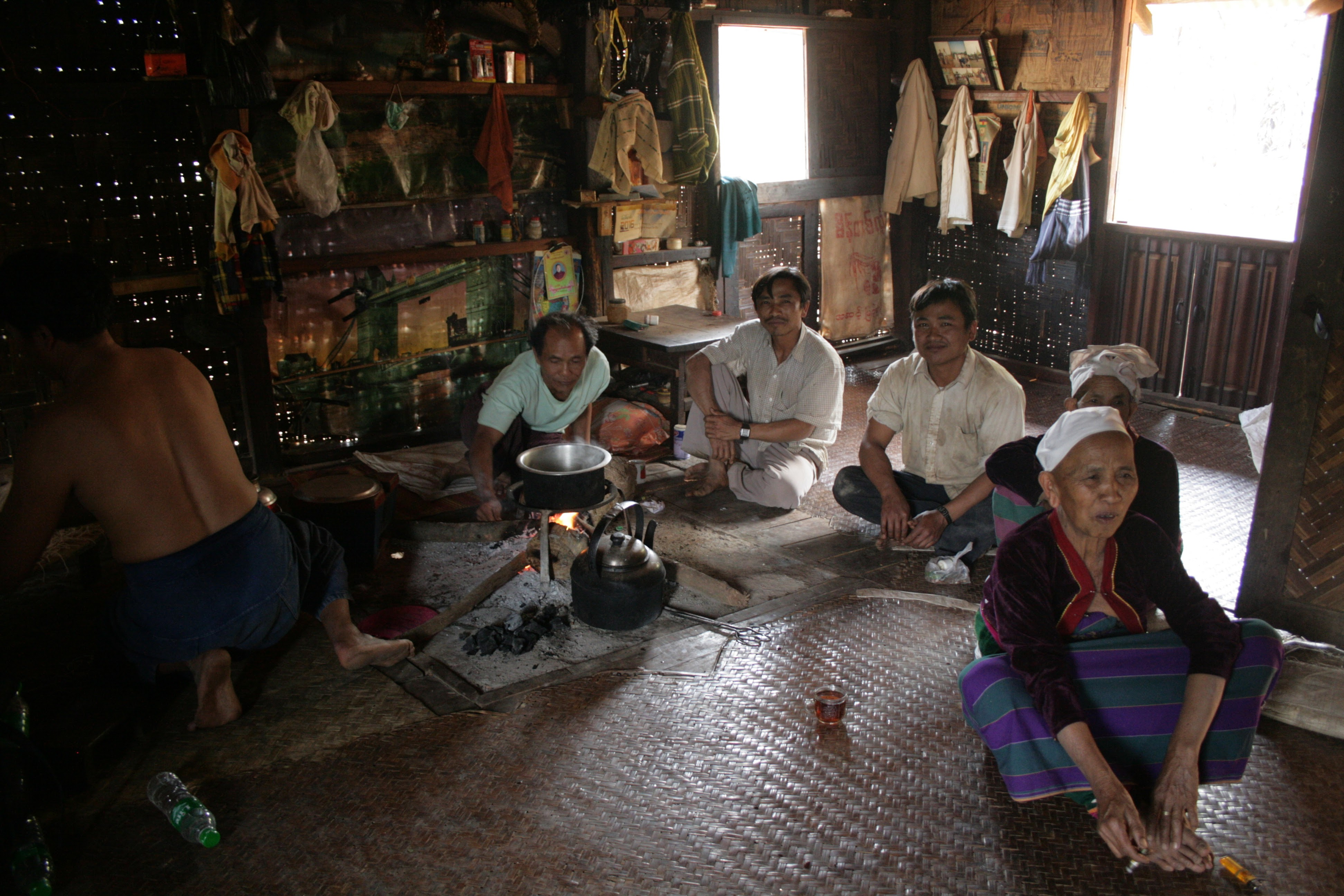

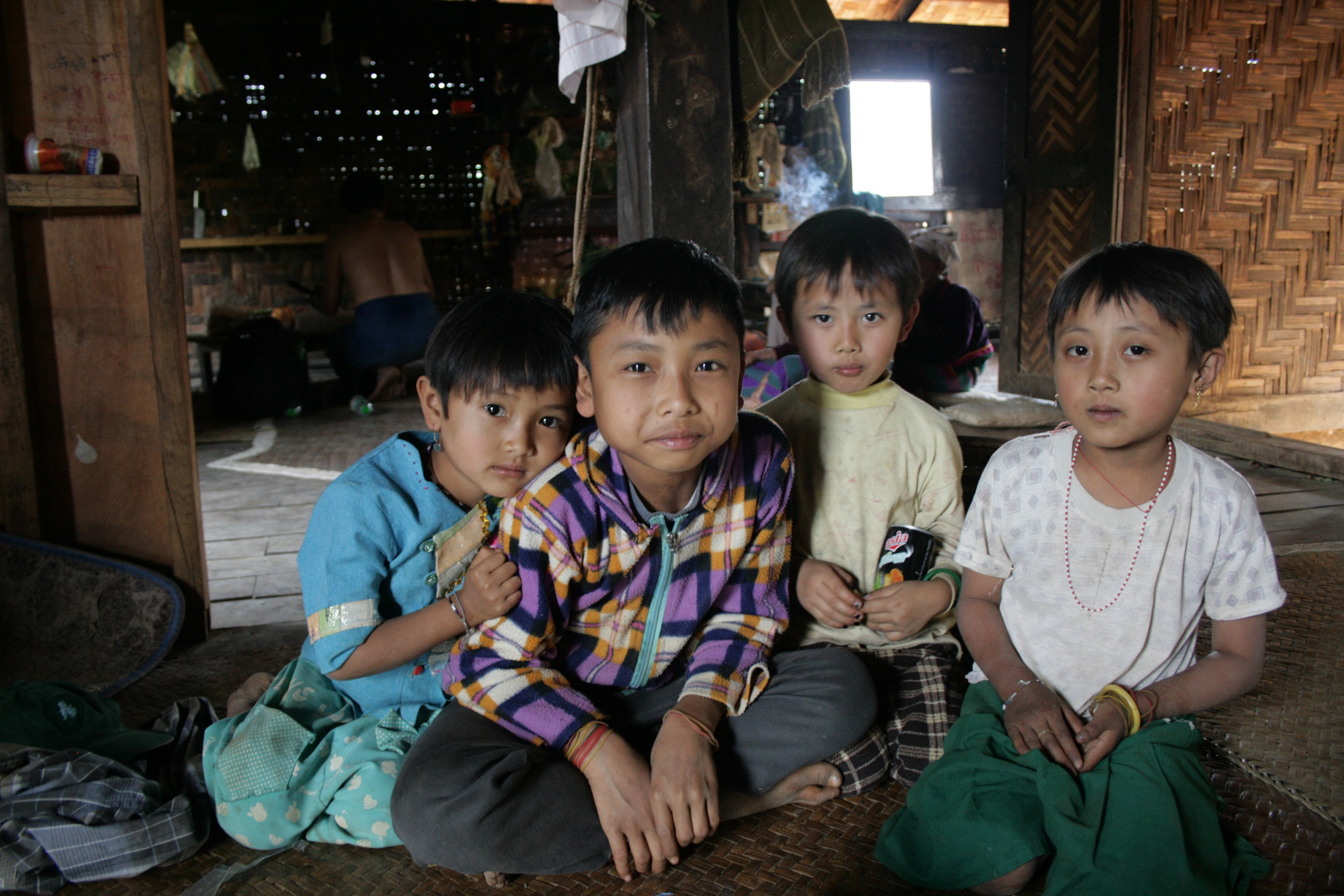

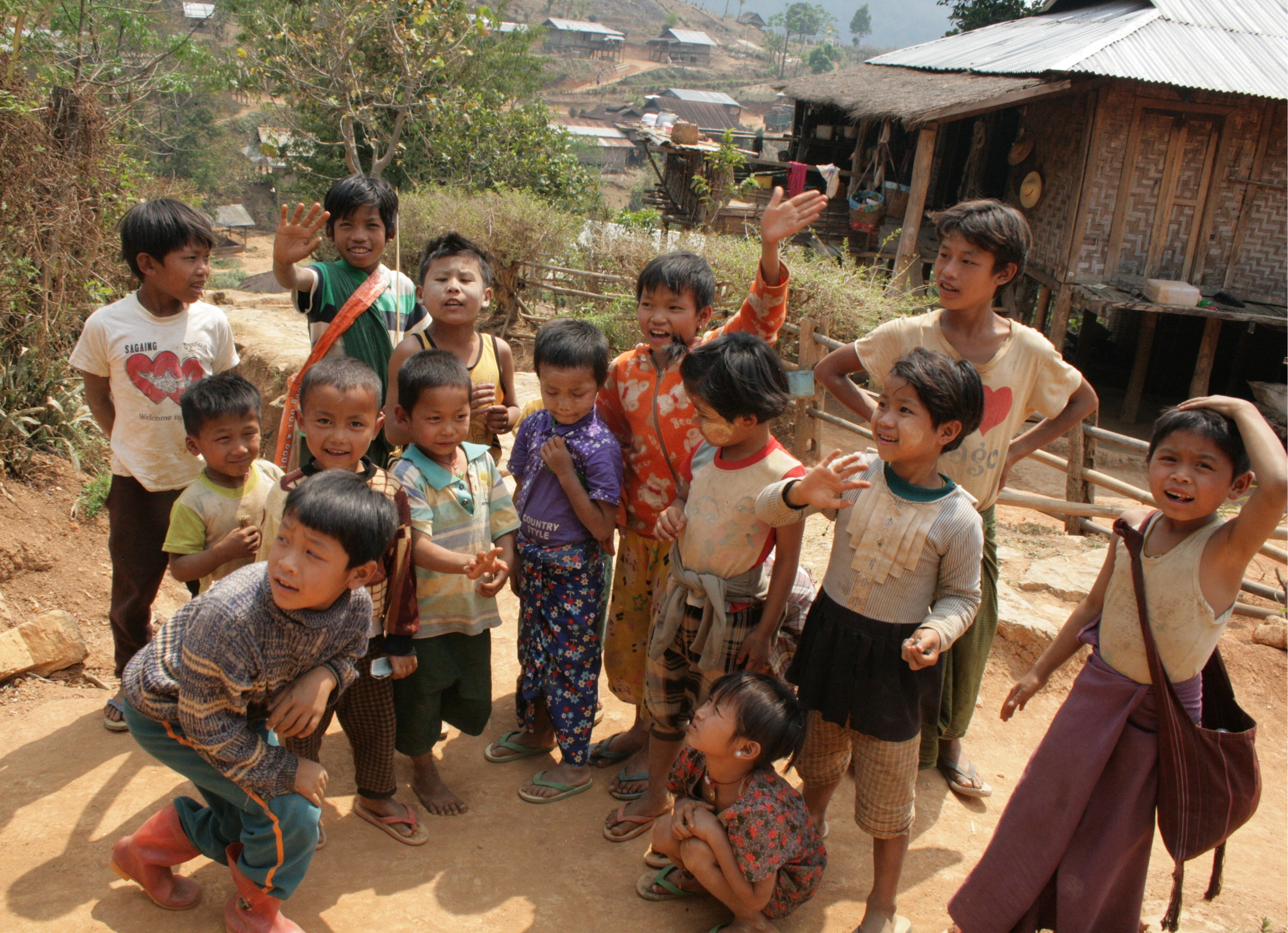

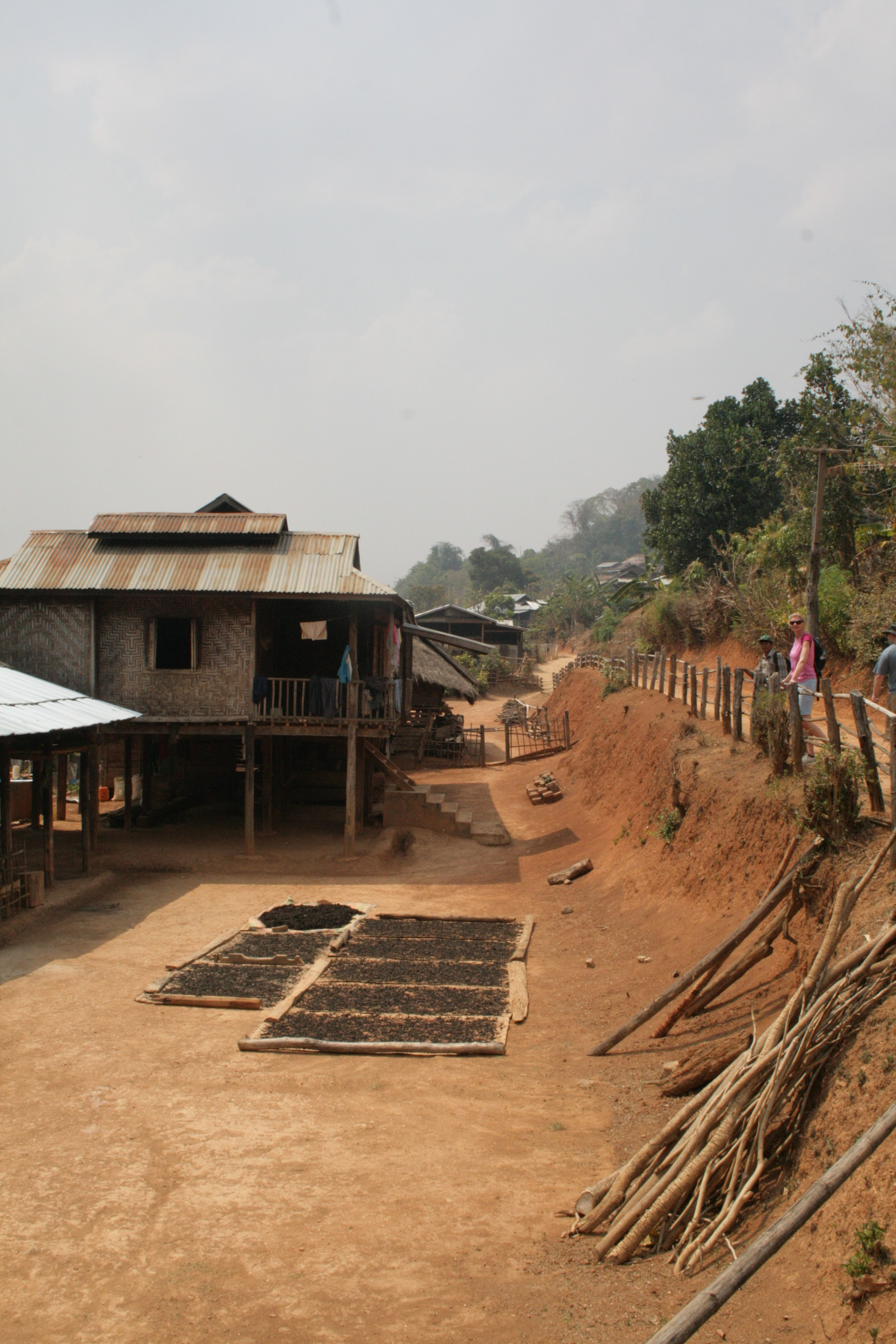
