= Kutkai =

Kutkai ကွတ်ခိုင်
- Town
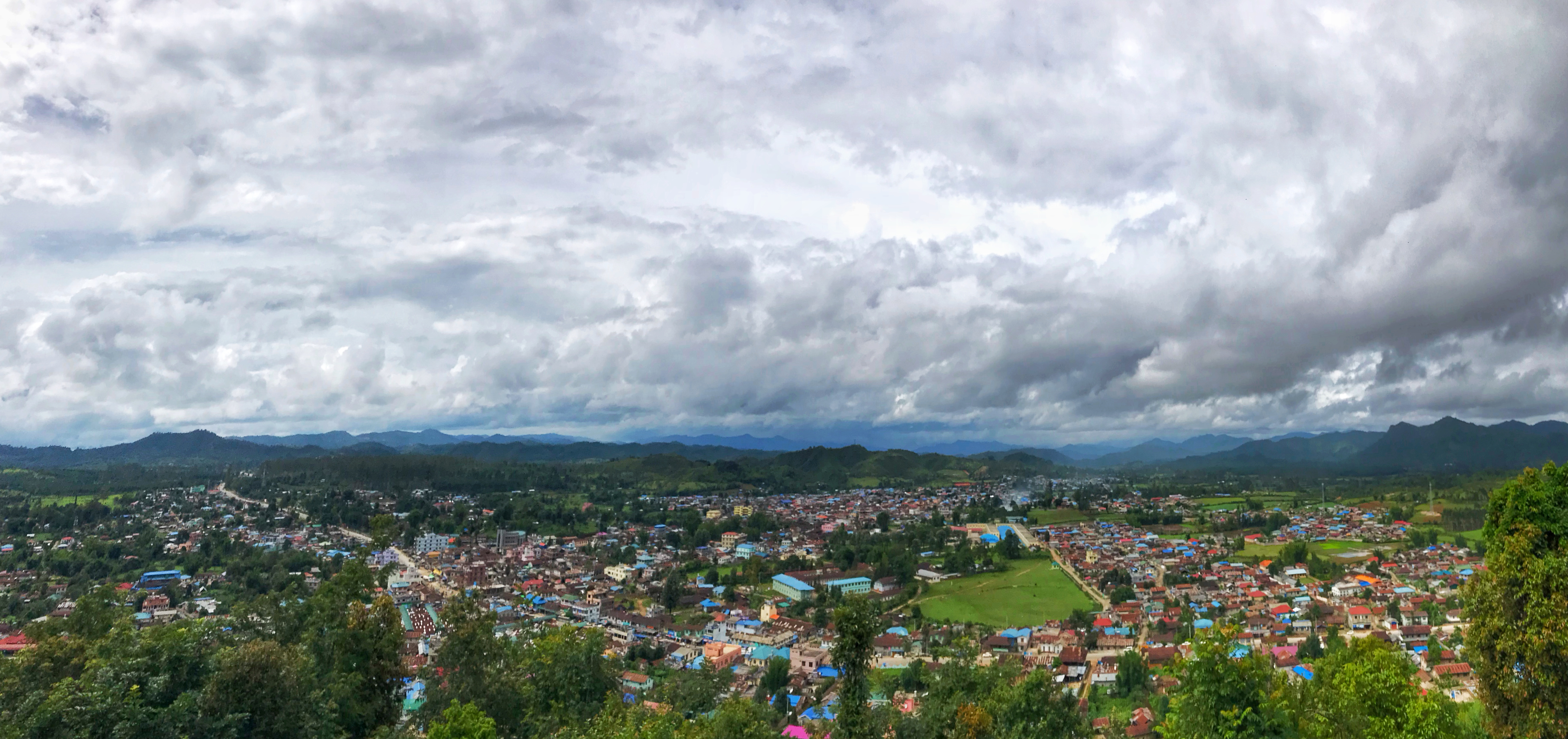

- Location in Myanmar
- Coordinates: 23°27′N 97°56′E
- Country: Myanmar
- State: Shan State
- District: Kutkai District
- Township: Kutkai Township
- Time zone: UTC+6.30 (MST)

Kutkai (Burmese: ကွတ်ခိုင် kwat hkuing [kʊʔkʰàɪɰ̃]) is the capital of Kutkai District and seat of Kutkai Township, in northern Shan State of eastern Myanmar. It lies along National Highway 3, approximately 24 kilometres to the north of Lashio.

== History ==
In the early 20th century, the area around Kutkai was explored by British botanists. In 1912, Stephenson documented that he had found the earthworm species Pheretima molesta of the genus Pheretima in Katkai.

Shan State became a major area for Christian missions to Burma in the mid-19th century. Kutkai was an important centre for the Kachin Baptist Church and was visited by missionaries, notably Baptist Reverend George J. Geis in the 1930s and Gustaf A. Sword from 1936 to 1942. Geis died in Kutkai on October 28, 1936 whilst he was working there at the Kachin Bible Training School he had established.

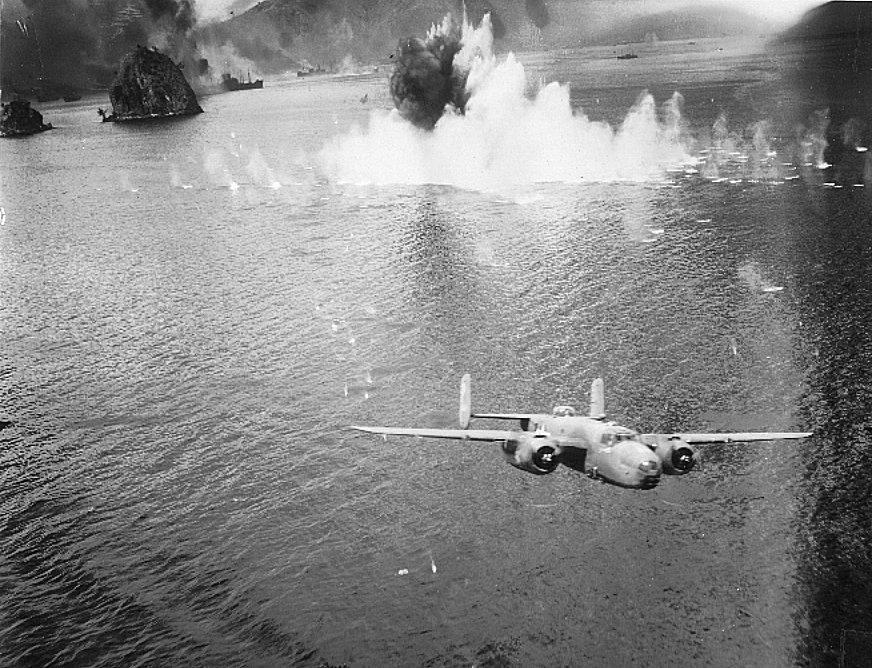
A B-25 Mitchell, the same type of aircraft as those that bombed Kutkai

During World War II, Kutkai was occupied by the Japanese. On September 10, 1944, the Chinese Fourteenth Air Force sent out 45 B-25 Mitchells to bomb Kutkai along with the towns of Tunganhsien, Lingling and Tunghsiangchiao. but the town was abandoned without a fight when the Chinese reached it on February 19, 1945.

In July 1954, Hoo Kya Chin, a Kokang businessman from Mu Kwan was arrested by the immigration officials in Kutkai for not carrying an identification card which caused some controversy in the region.

In the 1980s, two privates and a sergeant of the Kachin Independence Army insurgent 4th Brigade surrendered at Kutkai garrison.

In 2022, the town became the capital of the newly formed Kutkai District.

On 7 January 2024, the town was captured by the Three Brotherhood Alliance from the State Administration Council during Operation 1027, an offensive launched during the Civil War. The town was administered by the Ta'ang National Liberation Army.

Following a breakdown of the Three Brotherhood Alliance, the Myanmar National Democratic Alliance Army (MNDAA) captured the town from the Ta'ang National Liberation Army (TNLA).

== Geography ==
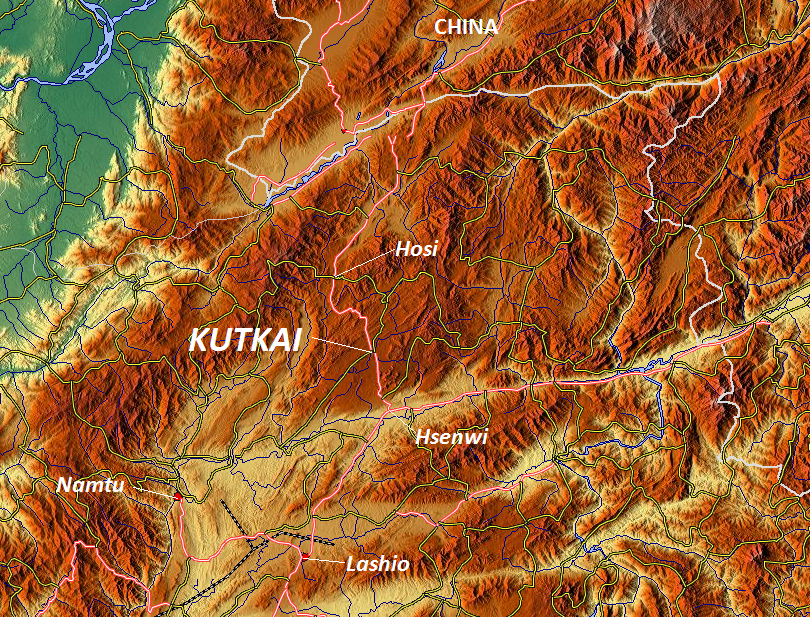
Map showing location of Kutkai

Kutkai is situated in eastern-central Burma, several kilometres by road north of Hsenwi and about 24 kilometres (15 mi) north of Lashio. It lies at an altitude of 4,800 feet (1,500 m). To the east of Kutkai is the Nam Ting River and the Salween River.

It sits on Mandalay-Lashio-Muse road aka Asian Highway route 14 (AH14). It is 222 miles (357 km) from Mandalay, 58 miles (93 km) from Lashio and 68 miles (109 km)to Muse. Kutkai-Tarmoene road is 17 miles (27 km), Kutkai-Kaungkha road is 8 miles (13 km), Kutkai-Manbyien road is 8 miles (13 km) and Kutkai-Karlaing road is 8 miles (13 km) also.

== Economy ==
As with many parts of Burma, the economy relies on agriculture, particularly rice production. Villagers in Kutkai Township are generally well educated in farming practices and in canning-bottling. Of major note is the Kutkai Market in the town where people come from miles to sell their goods. Kutkai High School is located in the southern part of the town. The town also contains the Kutkai General Hospital.

In the 1990s, Kutkai township was exposed as a major raw opium producing area. From September 1996, the U.S. Department of State funded $530,000 and established agricultural cooperatives in 25 villages in Kutkai township to crack down on the illegal drugs trade by promoting the growth of buckwheat, wheat, potatoes and other vegetables. Large quantities of opium were confiscated from the houses of villagers in the area in the summer of 1999. On July 31-August 1, 2003, a refinery was raided in Kutkai Township between the villages of Namhsaungkye and Nampyin revealing 62.452 kilos of heroin, 36.4 kilos of raw opium, 661.5 litres of lysol, 135 kilos of ether, 2,844 litres of chloroform, 202.5 litres of hydrochloric acid, 972 litres of acetic anhydrite, 2,975 kilos of ammonium chloride, 500 kilos of sodium carbonate, 500 grams of potassium chloride and 3.6 kilos of sodium, various weapons and 13 implements used in the refining of narcotic drugs.
