= Northern Alliance (Myanmar) =

Military alliance in Myanmar

Northern Alliance – Burma
- မြန်မာပြည်မြောက်ပိုင်း မဟာမိတ်တပ်ဖွဲ့
- Dates active: December 2016 – present
- Groups: Arakan Army; Kachin Independence Army; Myanmar National Democratic Alliance Army; Ta'ang National Liberation Army
- Active regions: Shan State; Kachin State; China–Myanmar border
- Ideology: Ethnic nationalism Ethnic separatism Federalism
- Size: 21,500–26,500+ total
- Wars: the internal conflict in Myanmar

The Northern Alliance, officially the Northern Alliance – Burma (Burmese: မြန်မာပြည်မြောက်ပိုင်း မဟာမိတ်တပ်ဖွဲ့; abbreviated NA-B), is a military coalition in Myanmar composed of four ethnic insurgent groups: the Arakan Army (AA), the Kachin Independence Army (KIA), the Myanmar National Democratic Alliance Army (MNDAA) and the Ta'ang National Liberation Army (TNLA). Since December 2016, the Northern Alliance has been in fierce military confrontations with the Tatmadaw (Myanmar Armed Forces) in the towns of Muse, Mong Ko, Pang Hseng, Namhkam and Kutkai in Shan State. The Northern Alliance members are also part of the Federal Political Negotiation and Consultative Committee (FPNCC).
