= Ta'ang National Liberation Army =

Ethnic armed organisation in Shan State, Myanmar

- တအာင်း အမျိုးသား လွတ်မြောက်ရေး တပ်မတော်
- Leaders: Tar Aik Bong; Tar Bone Kyaw; Tar Hod Plarng; Tar Jok Jar
- Dates active: January 1992 – present
- Allegiance: Ta'ang People's Government (since 2011)
- Headquarters: Namhsan, Myanmar
- Active regions: Tawngpeng, Shan State
- Ideology: Ta'ang nationalism Ethno-nationalism; Ethnocentrism; Federalism
- Size: 800 (2011) 4,000 (2015); 6,000 (2018); 10,000 (2020, self-claim) 10,000 (2023)
- Part of: Palaung State Liberation Front
- Website: taangland.org

The Ta'ang National Liberation Army (Burmese: တအာင်း အမျိုးသား လွတ်မြောက်ရေး တပ်မတော်, romanized: taaarinn aamyoesarr lwatmyawwatrayy tautmataw; abbreviated TNLA) is a political organisation and armed group in Myanmar. It is the armed wing of the Palaung State Liberation Front (PSLF).

== History ==
The PSLF has its origins in the Palaung National Front (PNF), a Ta'ang armed group founded in 1963. In 1976, the PNF leader Mai Kwan Tong broke away with the support of the Kachin Independence Organisation (KIO) and formed the Palaung State Liberation Organisation/ Palaung State Liberation Army (PSLO/PSLA), which quickly upstaged the PNF. The PSLA then waged a guerrilla war against the armed forces of the Socialist Republic of the Union of Burma. In the late 1980s, the group was weakened by the introduction of new counterinsurgency tactics and the signing of a ceasefire agreement by the KIO 4th Brigade, its longtime ally, which became the Kachin Defence Army and stopped supplying it with weapons. On 27 April 1991, the PSLA agreed to sign a ceasefire with the State Law and Order Restoration Council. In reaction, several of its members based at the headquarters of the Karen National Union in Manerplaw, on the Thailand–Myanmar border, rejected the decision of their mother organisation and on 12 January 1992 formed the Palaung State Liberation Front (PSLF) under Mai Tin Moung's leadership. (Note: Until he was assassinated in May 1994.) In the subsequent years, the PSLO progressively lost its influence. In 2005 it was forced by the regime to disarm and demobilise. Many dissatisfied rank-and-file members of the PSLO then joined the PSLF and were trained by the KIA's 3rd and 4th Brigades in Laiza.

In October 2009, the PSLF held its third congress and its leaders Tar Aik Bong and Tar Bone Kyaw announced the creation of the Ta'ang National Liberation Army (TNLA) as the armed wing of the PSLF. The TNLA then started operating in Ta'ang populated areas of northern Shan State and engaging in occasional clashes with the Tatmadaw. On 9 November 2012, it held an unofficial meeting with the junta's negotiating body, the Union Peace-making Work Committee, but contacts were not further developed. The TNLA did not take part in peace negotiations with the central government partly because of its lack of confidence in the latter's ability to control the army's actions. It was not a signatory of the Nationwide Ceasefire Agreement in 2015 but joined the UWSA-led Federal Political Negotiation and Consultative Committee. In 2016, it joined the Northern Alliance along with the Arakan Army (AA), the Kachin Independence Army (KIA), and the Myanmar National Democratic Alliance Army (MNDAA). In 2019, the AA, MNDAA, and TNLA strengthened their military cooperation by founding the Three Brotherhood Alliance.

After the 2021 coup d'état the TNLA initially avoided conflict with junta troops and took advantage of the drop in fighting to boost its governance capacities in northern Shan State. But the group is known to have "engaged indirectly with the NUG and provided support to PDFs and anti-military forces, even if mostly covertly". In December 2023, the TNLA took control of the Pa Laung Self-Administered Zone after the towns of Namhsan and Mantong were captured as part of Operation 1027 during the Myanmar civil war. On 11 January 2024 the junta and the Brotherhood Alliance agreed to a China-brokered ceasefire for northern Shan State, although the truce remains tenuous, with rebel forces claiming that regime's troops regularly conduct airstrikes and shelling in the area.

On 18 June, the TNLA announced that one of its fighters had been killed and four others injured by a junta drone strike in Nawnghkio Township. On 25 June, the group declared it was resuming Operation 1027 in response to repeated ceasefire violations by the junta and launched attacks in Nawnghkio and Kyaukme townships in coordination with local PDF units. On 26 June, it took control of the town of Nawnghkio and seized several positions near Kyaukme. On 28 June, it captured Kyaukme and began to encircle Mogok, taking over several nearby military bases.

On 2 September, the SAC declared the TNLA Ta'ang National Party, as a terrorist group.

From 1 to 3 June 2025, the Ta'ang Political Consultative Committee (TPCC) held a summit in Pangsang, Wa State, bringing together representatives from the TNLA, the Ta'ang National Party, and civil society groups. The meeting concluded with an agreement to transform the TPCC into the Ta'ang Land Council (TLC), which would act as the highest governing body of Ta'ang State, overseeing executive, legislative, and judicial functions.

On 15 April 2026, the TNLA congratulated Min Aung Hlaing and the Union Government of Myanmar for the "formation of a new civilian government". Widespread social media backlash occurred with accusations of betraying the ideals of the Spring Revolution. On 19 July 2026, PSLF officials (including Tar Bone Kyaw) met with the National Solidarity and Peacemaking Negotiation Committee (NSPNC) under the Second Min Aung Hlaing cabinet. The PSLF reportedly pushed for the creation of a "Ta'ang State" within Myanmar.

== Structure ==
Although in theory the TNLA is simply the defence department of the PSLF, in practice "there is little separation between the two" and "most PSLF officials are seconded from the armed wing".

In 2013, the TNLA started to organise its armed forces across Ta'ang areas in five regular battalions, plus one dedicated to headquarters-defence and special forces. The number of battalions increased to 7 in 2013 and to 21 in 2015, divided into 3 brigades and supervised by two tactical operation commands. In 2024, Tar Hod Plarng, TNLA's commander-in-chief, claimed that the group had "seven brigades and more than 30 battalions".

The TNLA recruits primarily through a conscription policy that obliges each household in areas under its control to provide at least one male recruit. Those with many sons must often provide two. The group has also been accused of enlisting child soldiers.

== Governance ==
Palaung State Liberation Front ပလောင်ပြည်နယ်လွတ်မြောက်ရေးတပ်ဦး
- Chairman: Tar Aik Bong
- Secretary-General: Tar Bone Kyaw
- Founded: 12 January 1992
- Headquarters: Namhsan, Shan State, Myanmar
- Ideology: Palaung interests Federalism
- Colors: Green, Red, White
- Slogan: Peace – Equality – Justice – Prosperity

Party flag

In areas it controls, the PSLF has set up a bureaucracy of 1,500 staff divided into 13 departments. Many of these lower-ranking administrators are members of the junta's administrative apparatus assimilated by the TNLA as it took control of their villages. This administrative network comprises "a central office, five district-level offices, eighteen offices at the township level and many more at the village-tract level". In 2018, the TNLA set up its own police force to maintain public order. The group also operates a parallel justice system with dedicated courts and prisons by recruiting civil servants and lawyers who sought refuge in its territory after defecting from the junta. In June 2023, the TNLA announced that it would establish forest reserve areas to prevent deforestation and preserve local species.

The TNLA has set up its own education system in partnership with local civil society groups and NUG workers, under the umbrella of the Ta'ang National Education Committee (TNEC). In 2023, the committee said it ran more than 420 schools, educating around 25,000 students.

The TNLA largely generates revenue through taxes on the transportation of goods and people. Another source of revenue is the payment of fees by Chinese contractors conducting infrastructure projects in the region in exchange for ensuring their free access and safety. The TNLA has also been accused of making money by taxing the local drug market, despite its anti-drug stance. It has kidnapped resisters and detained them until a ransom is paid.

The TNLA opposes the drug trade and drug use, which it sees as a health disaster for the local population, conducting operations where it destroys poppy fields, heroin refineries, and meth labs. The TNLA claims that it arrests opium smugglers regularly and the narcotics seized are publicly burned on special occasions to deter drug trade. In August 2012, a PSLF Central Committee meeting set up a 5-year plan to eradicate drugs, and in 2014 the group claimed to have destroyed "more than 1,000 acres of opium farms in Ta'ang regions" in two years. The group regularly detains drug users and sends them to "detention centres" to cut them off from their addictions. It also discourages local farmers from growing poppies by offering them crop substitution programs and interest-free micro-financing.

== Armed conflict ==
Since its creation, the TNLA has been frequently engaged in clashes with local armed militias established by the State Peace and Development Council junta, which are often involved in drug trafficking.

From 2009 to 2011, more aggressive attempts by the Tatmadaw to subordinate groups in the region led to an increase in direct clashes with the TNLA, as well as with the KIA and the MNDAA. Fighting between the TNLA and government troops then reached a new high in 2013 and 2014, leading to the death of 200 people and the displacement of more than 4,000 inhabitants. In November 2016, Northern Alliance forces launched coordinated attacks on military targets in northern Shan State and briefly took control of a portion of the Mandalay-Muse Highway. In November 2017, the TNLA attacked two Burma Army bases in Namhsan.

After joining the Nationwide Ceasefire Agreement in October 2015, the RCSS/Shan State Army-South began expanding its operations towards the China border, thus encroaching on territories controlled by the TNLA. Hostilities between the two groups broke out in November 2015 after RCSS forces ambushed TNLA soldiers near Namkham. The two groups engaged in regular skirmishes in the following years. In late 2020, fighting escalated again. In 2021, the TNLA, in cooperation with the Shan State Progress Party (SSPP), managed to register gains against RCSS troops, forcing them to withdraw south of the Mandalay-Muse Highway before pushing them back to their strongholds near the Thailand-Myanmar border.

== Alliances ==
The TNLA has long been allied with the KIO/KIA, with which it maintains close ties and cooperates militarily. More recently, the group has turned to the SSPP, which fought alongside it against the RCSS, as well as the UWSA, which supplies it with weapons. In May 2018, the TNLA opened its first liaison office in Pangkham, the de facto capital of Wa State. This led to a deterioration in relations with the KIA, coupled with mutual accusations of mistreatment of the local population. Tensions with the SSPP over the control and administration of territories liberated from the junta have also arisen.
