= Loikan =

- Country: Myanmar
- State: Shan State
- District: Kyaukme District
- Township: Kyaukme Township

Population
  - Ethnicities: Chinese
- Time zone: UTC+6.30 (MST)

Loikan is a village in Kyaukme Township, Shan State, Burma.

== History ==
In the 1900s, the nearby Valley of Death was a frequent battleground for the Kaung Kha rebel militia, who fought against various government forces.

In the 2010s, the village became a ketamine and methamphetamine haven for the Asian drug cartel Sam Gor, and a drug compound near the village was raided in 2018. In 2020, Myanmar police discovered over 3,700 litres of methylfentanyl in Loikan.
