= Kyaukme (disambiguation) =

Kyaukme may refer to:

- Kyaukme, Shan State, a town in northern Shan State, Myanmar
- Kyaukme District, a district in Shan State
- Kyaukme Township
- Kyaukme Dam
