= Myint Kyu =

Burmese footballer and manager

Personal information
- Date of birth: 20 August 1950 (age 76)
- Place of birth: Myanmar

Senior career*
Years	Team	Apps	(Gls)
- Finance and Revenue F.C.

International career
- Myanmar

Managerial career
- 1996–2006: Finance and Revenue F.C.
- 2009–: Southern Myanmar F.C. (manager)
- * Club domestic league appearances and goals

Myint Kyu (born 20 August 1950) is a Burmese football manager and former player.

== Early life ==
As a child, his father, Ba Juu, played for the national team.

== Career ==
Aged 20, Kyu made his debut for the national team; he would later make one substitute appearance in the 1972 Olympics in a 1–0 loss to the Soviet Union. In 1977, he retired from international football. He became coach of his former club Finance and Revenue when the league was restructured in 1996. He then joined Southern Myanmar, which is owned by businessman Htay Myint, chairman of the conglomerate Yuzana Company, in 2009 as team manager; he has held that position since the club's inception as well.
