= Mabein =

- Location in Myanmar
- Coordinates: 23°29′N 96°37′E
- Country: Myanmar
- State: Shan State
- District: Mongmit District
- Township: Mabein Township

Population (2005)
  - Ethnicities: Shan Palaung
  - Religions: Buddhism
- Time zone: UTC+6.30 (MST)

Mabein (Burmese: မဘိမ်း; Shan: မၢၼ်ႈပဵင်း, pronounced [mɑ᷆n péŋ]) is a town in northern Shan State of Myanmar (formerly Burma). It is situated on the Shweli River and connected to Momeik, and to Bhamo and Myitkyina in Kachin State by road. Mabein lies only 90 km (56 mi) from the border with Yunnan Province, China, but 200 km (124 mi) north of Mandalay.

The town was captured by the Kachin Independence Army (KIA) from the State Administration Council (SAC) on 21 January 2024 during the civil war.

== Economy ==
Mabein is a major rice producing area in the Shweli basin. Teak extracted from forests around Mabein is classified as Medium Good. Mabein Township is considered poppy - free by the United Nations International Drug Control Programme (UNDCP) in the Opium Survey 2002, and in the World Drug Report 2005 published by the United Nations Office on Drugs and Crime (UNODC).

Gold deposits exist in the Mabein region within the 500 km^{2} Shante gold belt within the Mogok metamorphics north and north-east of Mandalay. In January 2004, the military government signed a contract with two Canadian companies to prospect gold in two zones known as Set Ga Done and Nga Mu Gyi.

== Security vs human rights ==
On 10 November 2005, seven hired cattle drovers were reported shot dead by an army patrol from a battalion based in Momeik.
