= Htike Zaw =

Burmese politician (1967–2020)

MP Hteik Zaw
- ထိုက်ဇော်

Member-elect of the House of Nationalities
- Preceded by: Zaw Min Latt
- Constituency: Shan State № 1

Personal details
- Born: 4 October 1967 Taungdwingyi, Myanmar
- Died: 21 November 2020 (aged 53) Pin Tain village, Kyaukme
- Party: National League for Democracy
- Spouse: Ohnmar
- Children: 2
- Occupation: Politician

Htike Zaw (Burmese: ထိုက်ဇော်; also spelt Hteik Zaw or Htaik Zaw, 4 October 1967 – 21 November 2020) was a Burmese politician who was elected MP for the Amyotha Hluttaw (Upper House) from Shan State constituency No 1. He was assassinated for being the political dissatisfaction with the recent general election result at his home in Pin Tain village in Kyaukme Township.

== Early life and career ==
Hteik Zaw was born on 4 October 1967 in Taungdwingyi, Magway Region, Myanmar to parents Zaw Win and Khin Oo Myint. He finished higher education. He moved to Kyaukme as a forest ranger a few years before the 8888 pro-democracy uprising. He was married to a Kyaukme native Ohmar and settled in Kyaukme. He opened a general store in his home.

== Political career ==
In 2012, he joined the National League for Democracy. In the 2020 Myanmar general election, he won a seat in the Amyotha Hluttaw from Shan State № 1 parliamentary constituency. His opponents in that race were Kyaw Sein from the Union Solidarity and Development Party, Soe Ko Khine from the Union Solidarity Party, Sai Tun Lin from the Union Betterment Party, Sai Sam Lian from Shan Nationalities League for Democracy and Nwe Ni Tun from the Ta'ang National Party. He was involved in a dispute over the results of the 2020 election.

=== Assassinated ===
On 21 November 2020, he was shot dead by unidentified armed men at his home in Pin Tain village in Kyaukme Township. His funeral was held on 23 November at Kyaukme Cemetery. His final journey was accompanied by the Shan State Chief Minister Linn Htut, many high-ranking government officials, political colleagues and hundreds of people.

=== Reactions ===
The National League for Democracy Party (main) subsequently condemned the violence and expressed its condolences to the victim's family in a statement.

Christian Lecherv, the French ambassador to Myanmar, strongly condemned in a statement the cowardly assassination and called for those responsible to be brought to justice.

The US Embassy in Yangon expressed its condolences to the victim's family in a statement.

Dr. Min Zaw Oo, the executive director of the Myanmar Institute for Peace and Security, told the media that the assassination could mark the beginning of a culture of political violence.

The United Nations in Myanmar in a statement condemned the assassination and hope those responsible can be swiftly identified and brought to justice.
