= Mantong =

Mantong may refer to:

- Mantong, Myanmar
- Mantong Township, Myanmar
- Mantong, an alleged language seen in the works of Richard Sharpe Shaver
