= Mongmit Township =

Mongmit Township မိုးမိတ်မြို့နယ်
- Township
- Momeik Township
- Location in Mongmit district (in red)
- Coordinates: 23°6′0″N 96°40′0″E
- Country: Myanmar
- State: Shan State
- District: Mongmit District
- Elevation: 640 ft (195 m)
- Time zone: UTC+6:30 (MMT)

Mongmit Township (Shan: မိူင်းမိတ်ႈ) is a township of Mongmit District (formerly part of Kyaukme District) in the Shan State, Myanmar. The principal town is Mongmit (also spelt Momeik).
