= Lahpet =

Burmese pickled tea

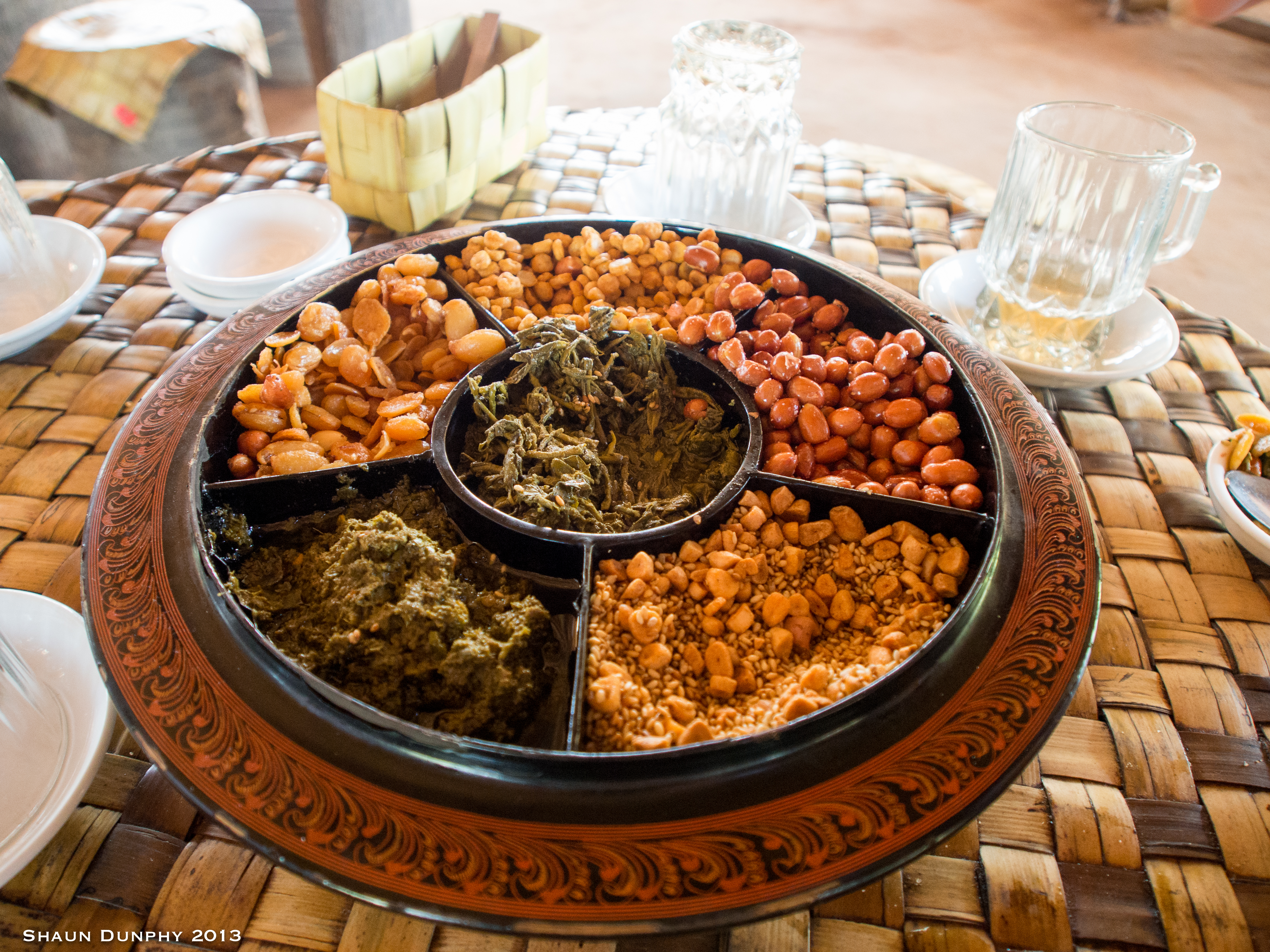
- Lahpet thoke, Burmese tea leaf salad or pickled tea salad is a favourite national dish.
- Place of origin: Burma
- Region or state: possibly Namhsan, Shan State
- Associated cuisine: Burmese cuisine
- Main ingredients: Fermented tea leaves; oil; salt; nuts

Lahpet, also spelled laphek, laphet, l'phak, leppek, le'pek, or lek-pek in English (Burmese: လက်ဖက်, MLCTS: lak hpak, pronounced [ləpʰɛʔ]), is Burmese for fermented or pickled tea. In Myanmar, tea is consumed both as a drink and as an eaten delicacy, in the form of pickled tea, which is unique to this region. Lahpet is regarded as a national delicacy that plays a significant role in Burmese society, and remains a traditional Burmese gesture of hospitality and is served to guests visiting a home.

Its place in the cuisine of Myanmar is reflected by the following popular expression: "Of all the fruit, the mango's the best; of all the meat, pork's the best; and of all the leaves, lahpet's the best". In English-speaking areas, laphet is most commonly encountered in "tea leaf salad" (လက်ဖက်သုပ်).

Fermented or pickled tea is featured in the cuisines of many ethnicities who live near the geographical origin of tea, such as the cuisines of the Bulang, and in Tai cuisine (where it is known as miang in dishes such as miang kham).

== Forms ==
Burmese tea is processed in three major forms:

- Lahpet chauk (လက်ဖက်ခြောက်), or dried tea leaves, also called a-gyan gyauk (အကြမ်းခြောက်), is used to make green tea, which is called yei-nway gyan (ရေနွေးကြမ်း, plain/crude hot water) or lahpet-yei gyan (လက်ဖက်ရည်ကြမ်း, plain/crude tea). Green tea is the national drink in the predominantly Buddhist Myanmar, a country with no national drink other than palm wine.
- Acho gyauk (အချိုခြောက်, lit. 'sweet and dry'), or black tea, is used to make sweet Burmese milk tea (လက်ဖက်ရည်ချို, lahpetyei gyo) with milk and sugar.
- Lahpet so (လက်ဖက်စို, lit. 'wet tea') specifically refers to a pickled tea, despite lahpet being generally synonymous with pickled tea.

=== Quality grades ===
Burmese tea is distinguished into seven quality grades:

1. 'Golden bracelet' (ရွှေလက်ကောက်)
2. 'Extraordinary weft' (အထူးရှယ်)
3. 'Weft' (ရှယ်)
4. 'Top grade' (ထိပ်စ)
5. 'Medium top grade' (အလတ်ထိပ်စ)
6. 'Medium grade' (အလတ်စ)
7. 'Low grade' (အောက်စ)
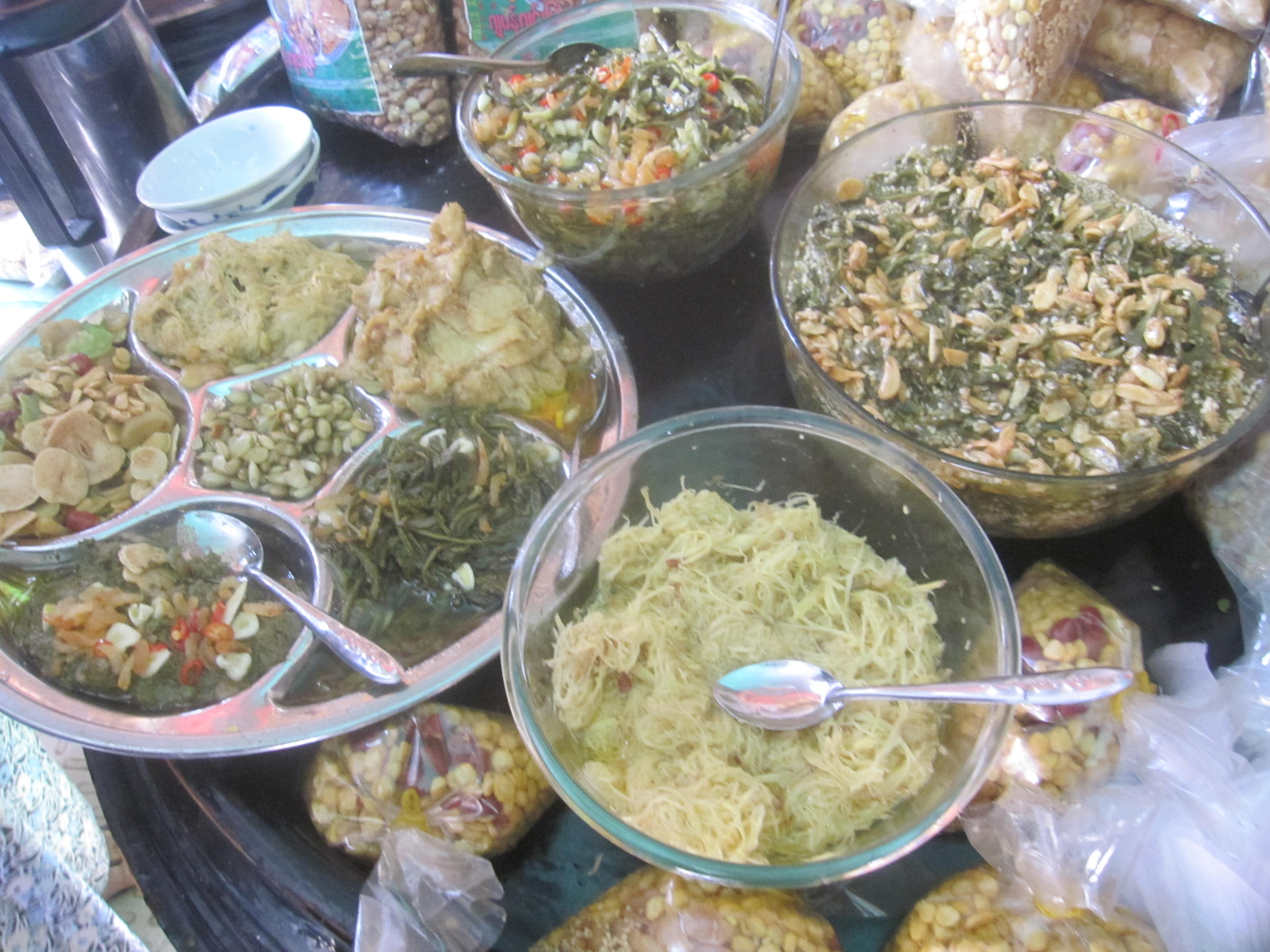
Tasters at a lahpet stall in Mandalay

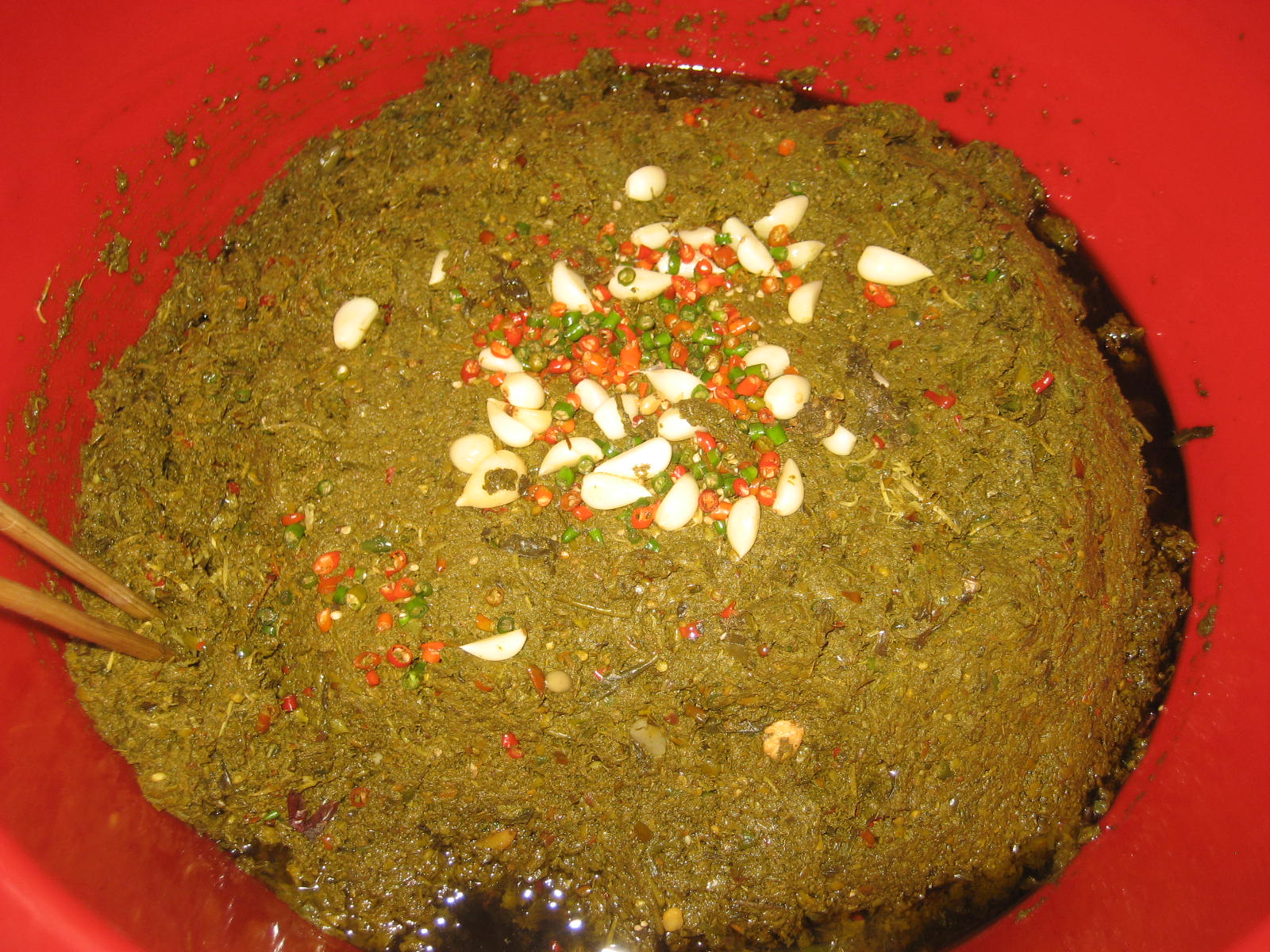
Lahpet dressed with garlic and chilli

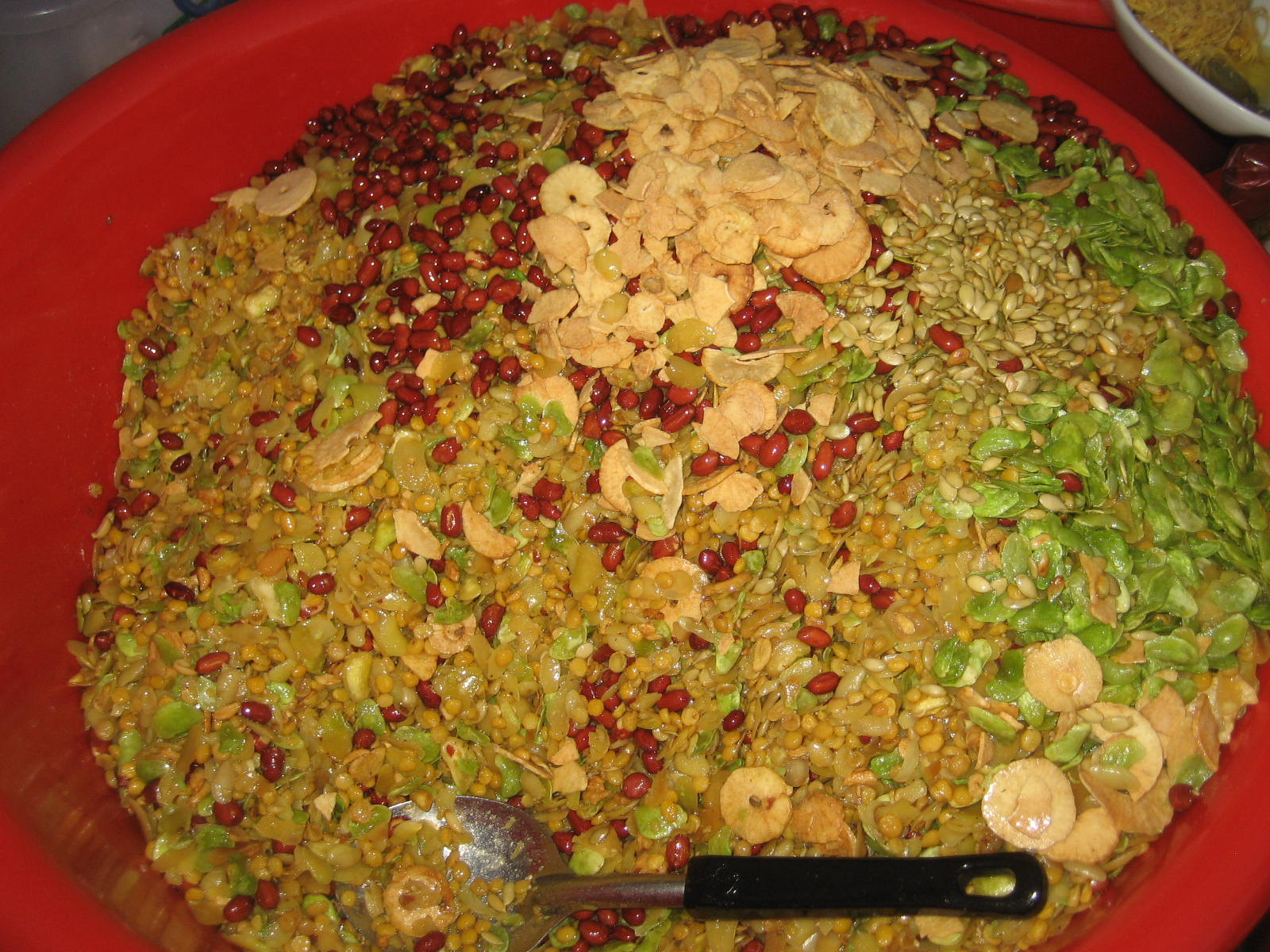
Fried garnish with lahpet

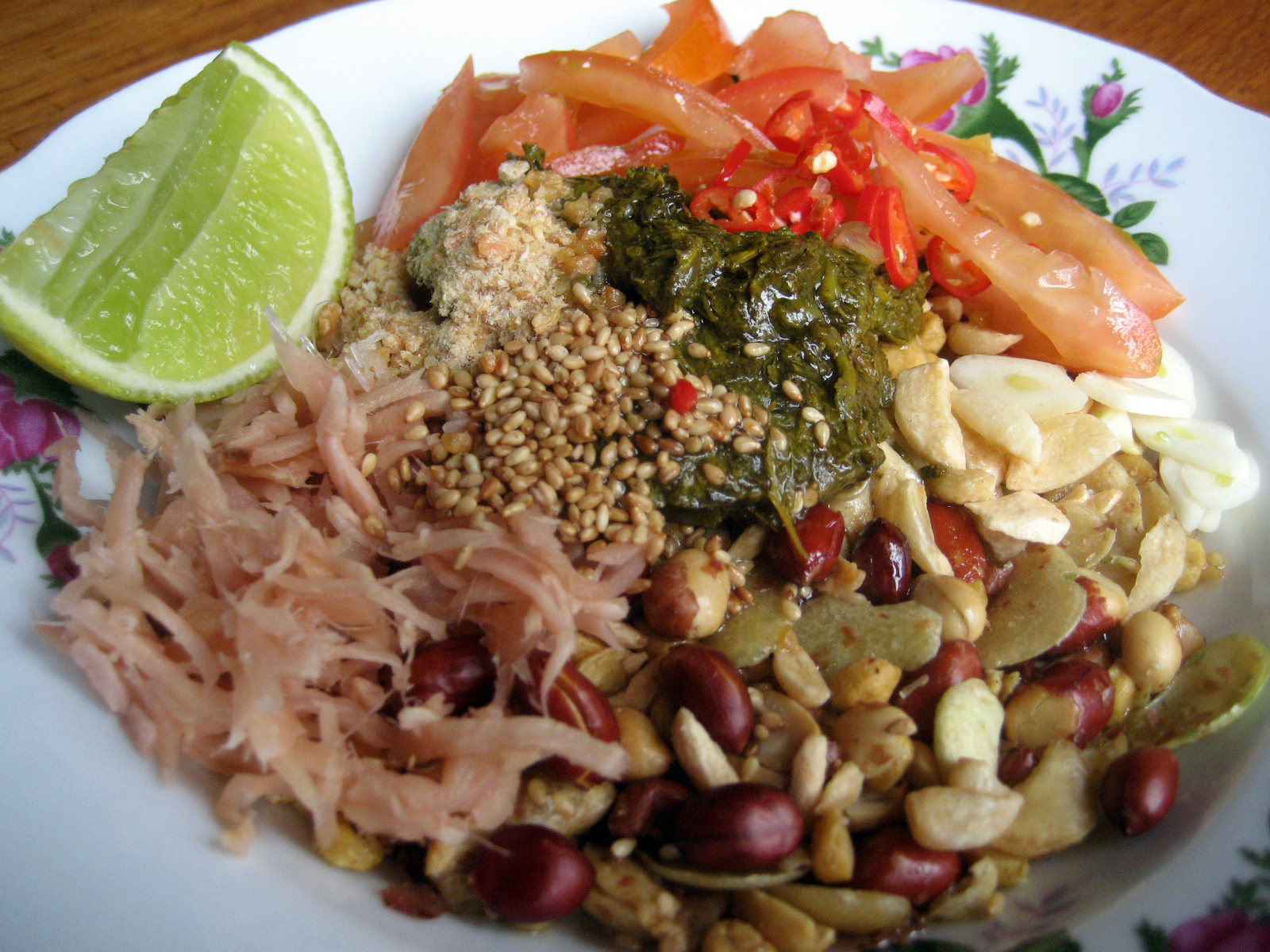
Lahpet dish

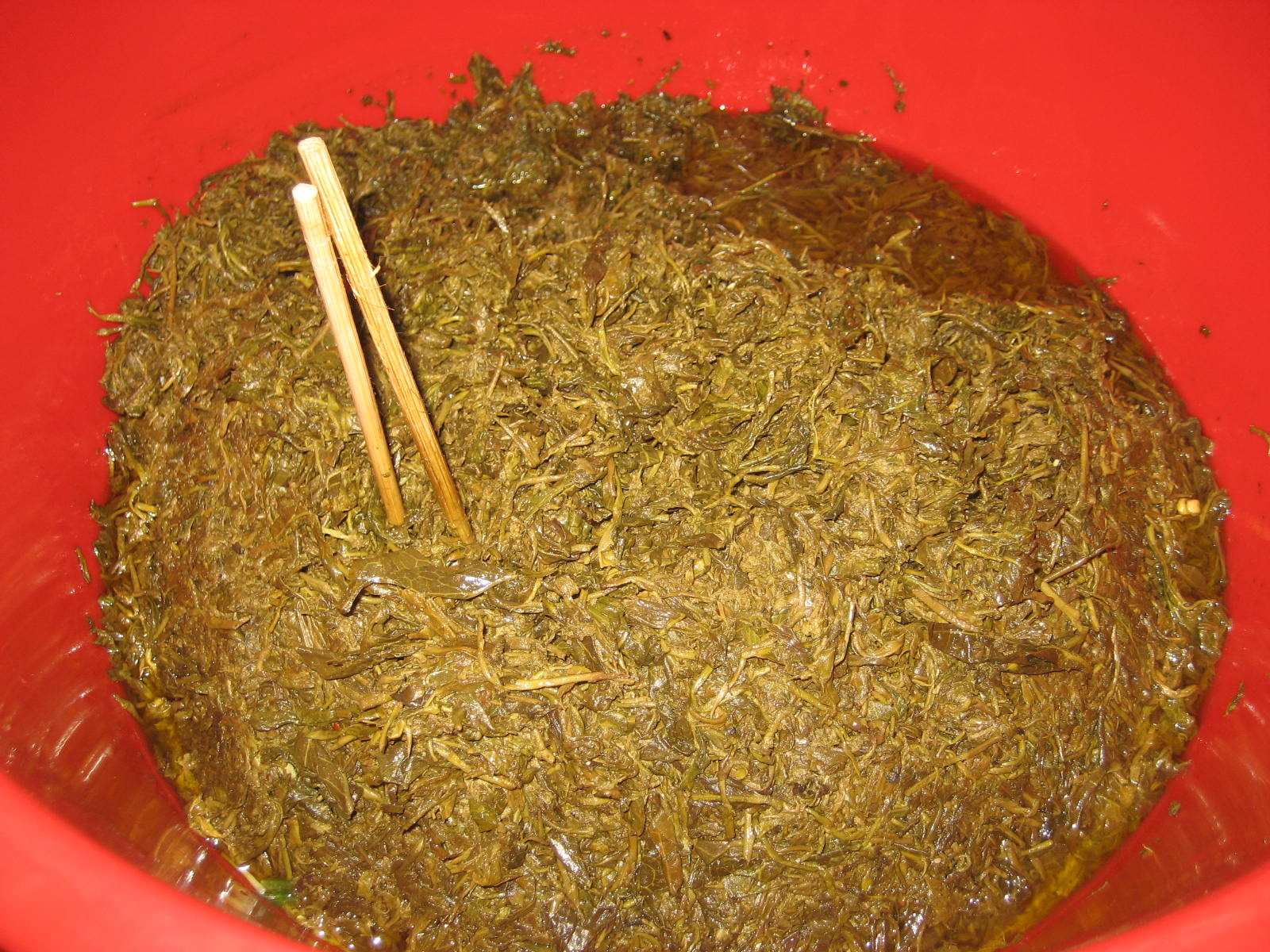
Lahpet for sale at a market in Mandalay

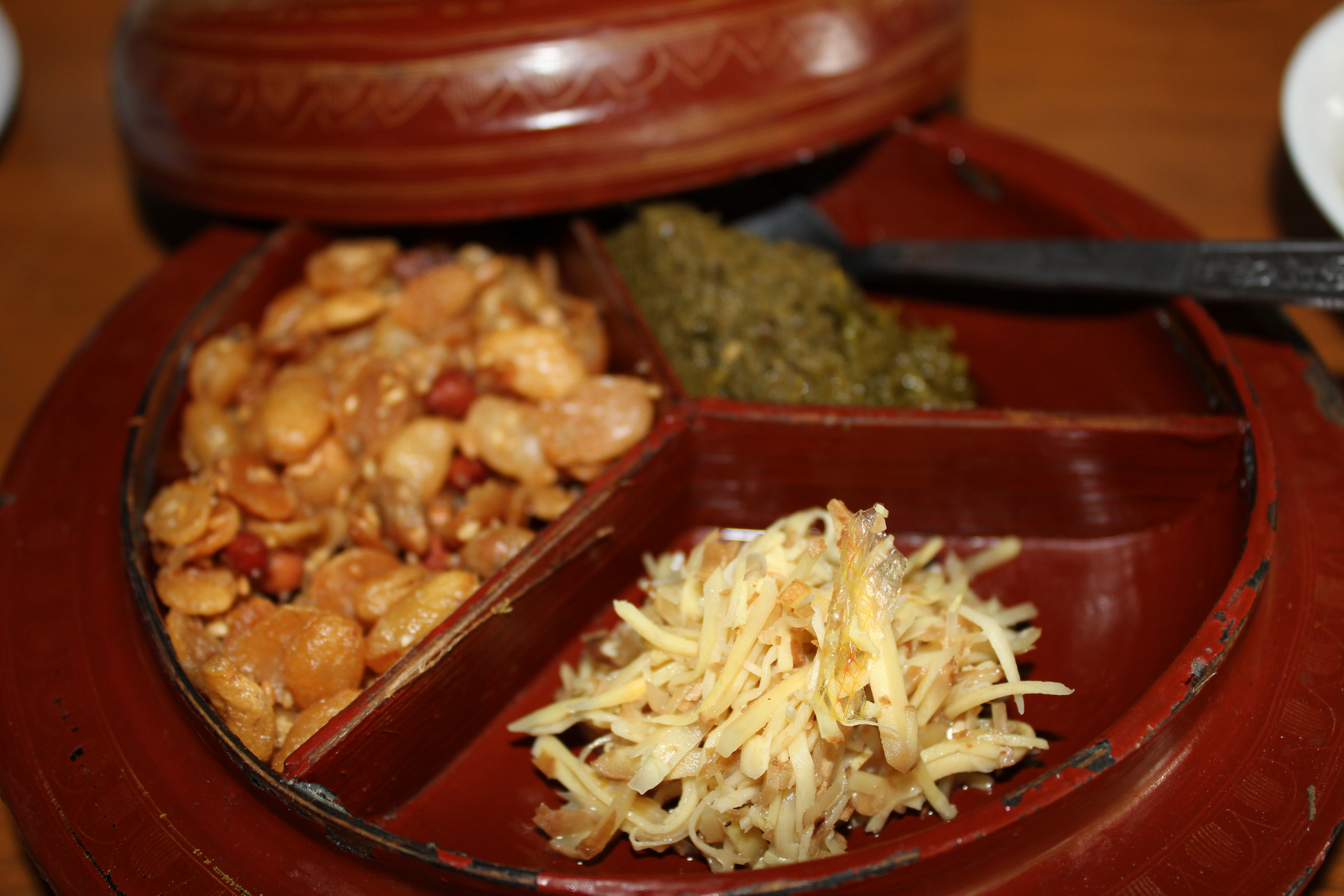
Lahpet thoke and gyin thoke (ginger salad)

== History ==
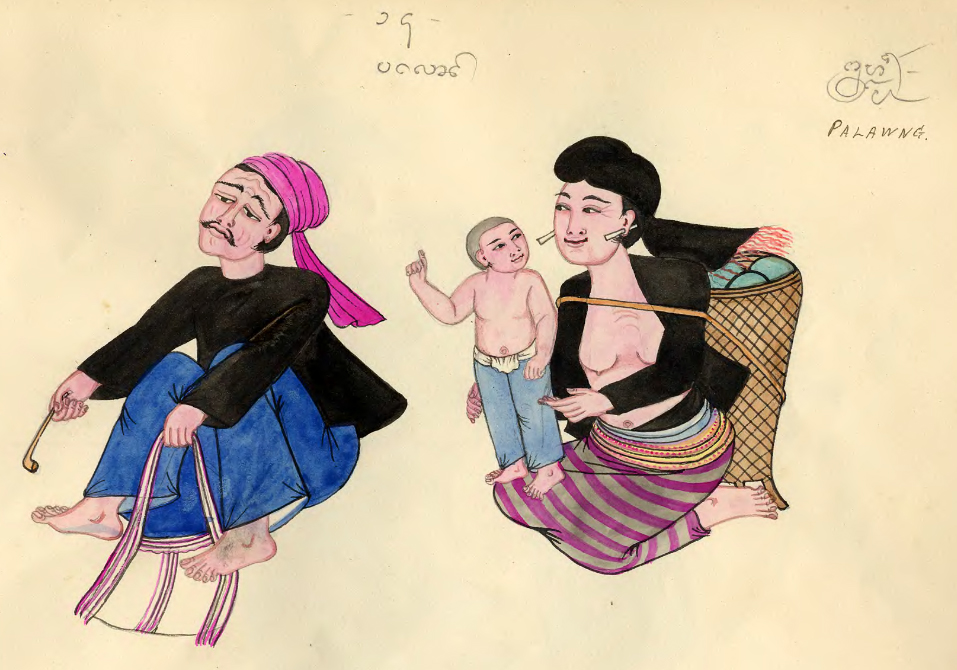
A Burmese illustration depicting the Palaung people, who traditionally cultivated and fermented Burmese tea.

The practice of eating tea in modern-day Myanmar dates back to prehistoric antiquity, reflecting a legacy of indigenous tribes who pickled and fermented tea leaves inside bamboo tubes, bamboo baskets, plantain leaves and pots. This longstanding history is reflected in the Burmese language, which is among the few world languages whose word for "tea" is not descended from the Chinese word for "tea" (see etymology of tea). European observers noted with peculiarity the Burmese fondness for pickled tea leaf, and the practice of burying boiled tea leaves in holes lined with plantain leaves, for the purpose of fermentation.

According to Burmese folklore, tea was introduced to the country by King Alaungsithu in the 1100s, during the Pagan dynasty. Records of tea drinking date back to his reign, with evidence of royal teacups and tea servers employed in the Burmese royal court. As Burmese kingdoms adopted more austere forms of Theravada Buddhism, pickled tea began to replace alcohol for ceremonial use among observant Buddhists. To meet growing demand, tea cultivation spread throughout the northern Shan States after 1500. Between the late 1500s and early 1600s, a Buddhist reform movement led by monks and laymen succeeded in suppressing the consumption of alcohol in public ceremonies in favor of eating pickled tea. By the late 1700s, alongside cotton, tea had become a significant export for Burma, largely cultivated in the Palaung principality of Tawngpeng. Mandalay Palace, built during the late Konbaung era, had a Tea Pavilion (လက်ဖက်ရည်ဆောင်) wherein young pages carried messages and prepared tea. The Burmese poet U Ponnya composed verses in the Laphet Myittaza (လက်ဖက်မေတ္တာစာ) and poems that identified shwephi tea leaves (ရွှေဖီ, lit. 'golden thrust') as a favorite tea grade of the royal court, and laphet as an integral part of the royal cuisine, both as a drink and as a delicacy. Shwephi leaves are considered the highest quality because they come from the earliest harvests of the year.

Throughout the pre-colonial era, lahpet was considered a symbolic peace offering between warring kingdoms in ancient Myanmar. It was traditionally exchanged and consumed after settling a dispute. In both pre-colonial and colonial times, lahpet was served after a civil court judge made a verdict; eating the lahpet symbolized a formal acceptance of the verdict.

During the colonial era, tea shops became a common fixture in urban centres like Rangoon (now Yangon). These shops opened early in the day, and served breakfast, snacks and tea. In the 1970s, tea shops spread to other parts of the country. These establishments have served as third places and important meeting points for locals. Until recent decades, tea shops were primarily frequented by men.

Since the late 2010s, armed conflict in tea-growing areas between ethnic armed organisations, including the Ta’ang National Liberation Army and the Restoration Council of Shan State, has disrupted the domestic tea supply chain. This has been compounded by the COVID-19 pandemic, which created a labour shortage and drastically reduced the average selling price of Burmese tea leaves. Bamar migrants from the Anyar region, who traditionally augmented the local workforce during the tea-growing season, have sought higher-paying jobs in Thailand or Burmese-Chinese border towns like Laukkai and Panghsang.

== Cultivation ==
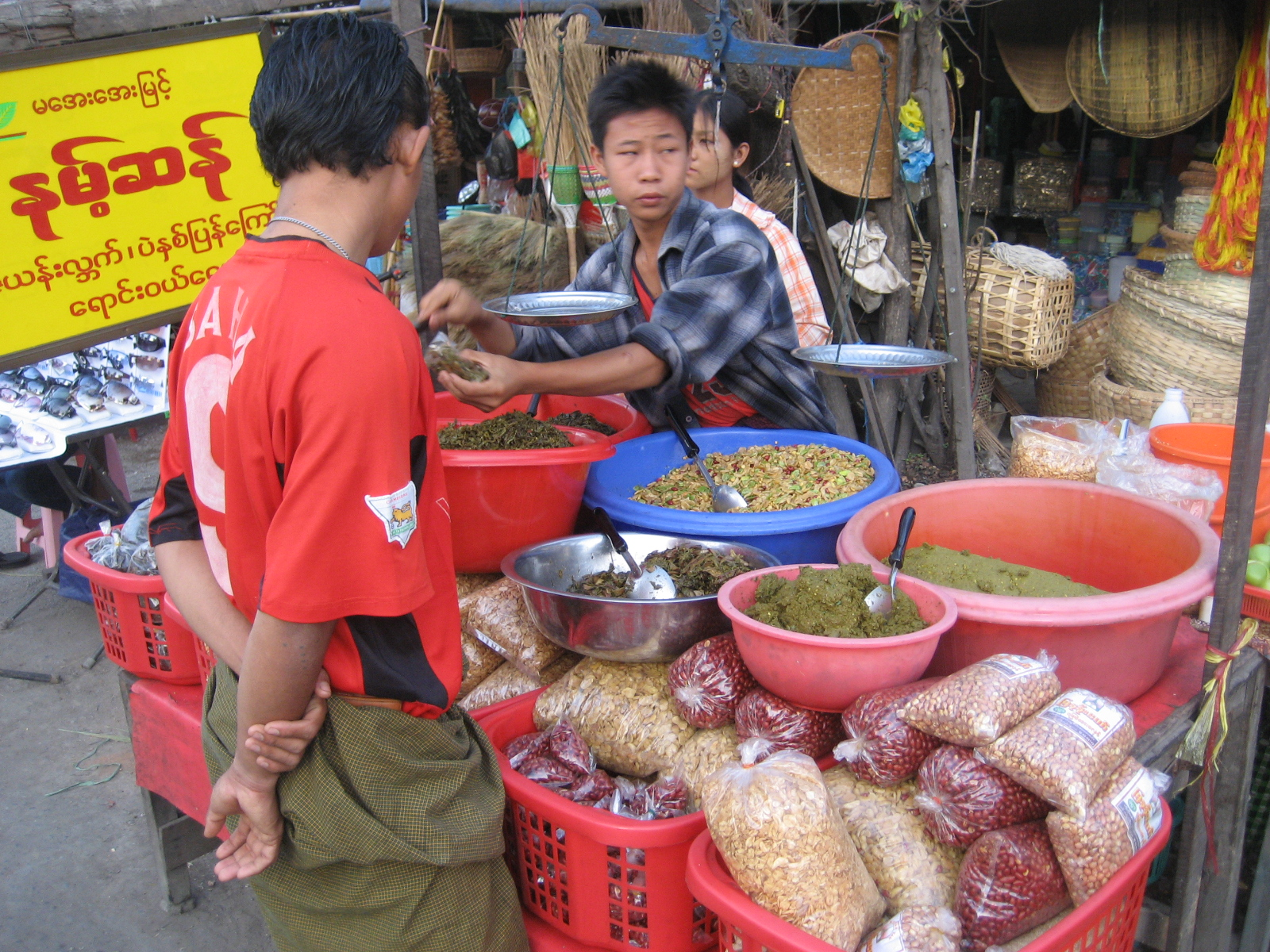
Market stall in Mandalay selling lahpet from Namhsan

Tea is native to Myanmar. Camellia sinensis and Camellia assamica, two popular species of tea, are grown in the northern Shan State around Namhsan in the Palaung substate of Tawngpeng. Tea is also grown around Mogok in the Mandalay Region and Kengtung in the eastern Shan State. Zayan leaves, which make up about 80% of the harvest, are picked in April and May before the onset of the seasonal monsoons, but can be picked up until October.

Over 700 square kilometres (270 mi^{2}) of land in Myanmar is under tea cultivation, with an annual yield of 60,000-70,000 tons of fresh product. Of the tea consumed by the country every year, 52% is green tea, 31% is black tea and 17% is pickled tea.

== Processing ==
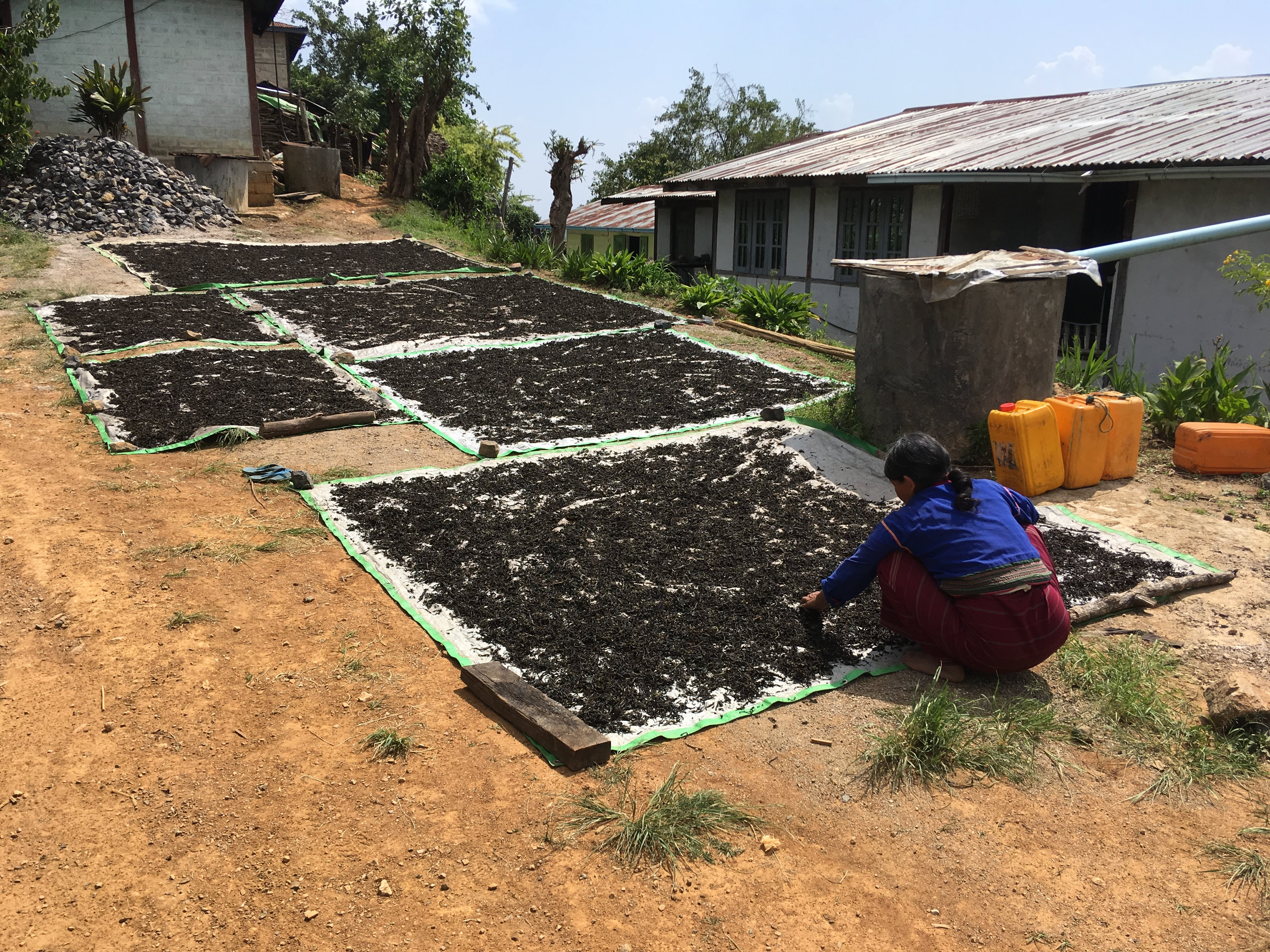
Sun-dried tea leaves near Kalaw.

The traditional laphet fermentation process is a three-step process, encompassing pre-fermentation, fermentation, and modification of the fermented tea leaves. Tender juvenile tea leaves and leaf buds are selected for fermenting, while the rest are relegated to dry. After picking, the tea leaves are steamed for about five minutes before either drying or fermenting. Young leaves are then packed into bamboo vats or clay pots, set in pits and pressed by heavy weights to extract water. The fermentation process is checked at intervals and the pulp may occasionally require re-steaming. The anaerobic fermentation is driven by naturally forming lactic acid bacteria, and is completed in 3–4 months. Stages of fermentation are indicated by the pulp's changes in color (from green to golden-green), texture (softened leaves), and acidity, which decreases with time. The near-final pulp is then washed, massaged, and drained. The final form of laphet is then flavored with minced garlic, ground chili, salt, lemon juice, and peanut oil.

== Preparation styles ==
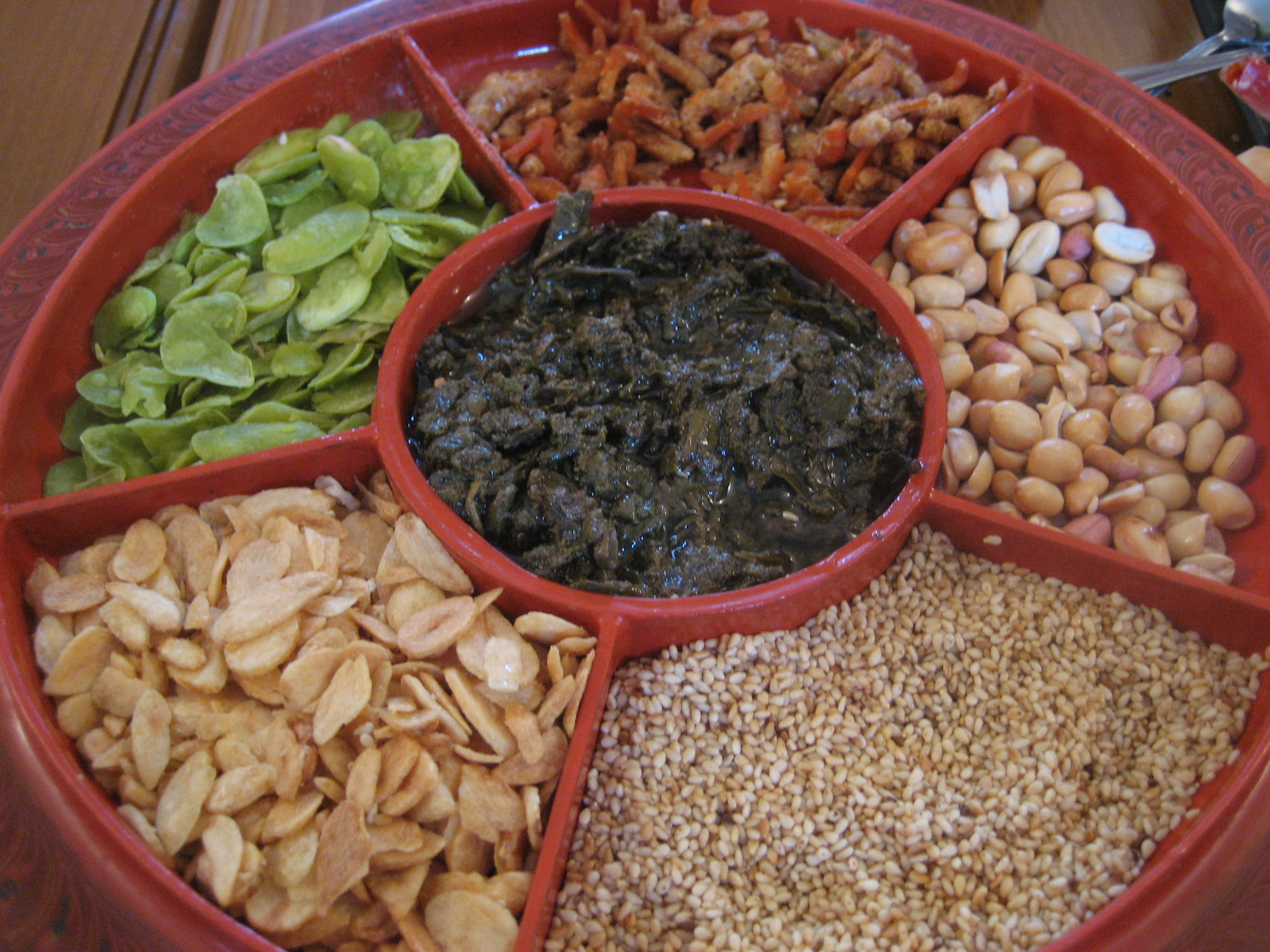
Pickled tea in the center compartment is served in a lahpet ohk with accompanying condiments

Burmese lahpet (လက်ဖက်သုပ်) is served in two main forms. The first is mainly ceremonial and is called A-hlu lahpet (အလှူလက်ဖက်, လက်ဖက်သုပ်လူကြီးသုပ် or အဖွားကြီးအိုသုပ်) or Mandalay lahpet. The second form is mostly served with meals and is more popular.

Mandalay lahpet is traditionally served in a shallow lacquerware dish with a lid and several compartments called a lahpet ohk. Pickled tea flavored with sesame oil is put in the central compartment. Other compartments may include ingredients such as crisp fried garlic, chickpeas, lablab, butterfly peas, Australian peas, toasted sesame and peanuts, crushed dried shrimp, preserved shredded ginger and fried shredded coconut.

Lahpet is served in this form for hsun kyway (offering a meal to monks) at Buddhist novitiation ceremonies called shinbyu and at weddings. No special occasion or ceremony in Myanmar is considered complete without Mandalay lahpet. In nat (spirit) worship, lahpet is offered to the guardian spirits of forests, mountains, rivers, and fields. Invitations to a shinbyu are traditionally done by calling from door to door with a lahpet ohk, and acceptance is indicated by partaking in it.

Lahpet may be served as a snack or after a meal for family and visitors. It is usually placed in the center of the table with the green tea. It has a bittersweet and pungent taste and leafy texture. Many believe in its medicinal properties for the digestive system and for controlling bile and mucus. Its stimulant effect (from the caffeine in tea) is especially popular with students preparing for exams, pwè goers at all-night theatrical performances, and funeral aides who keep watch on caskets overnight.

Lahpet thohk (လက်ဖက်သုပ်) or Yangon lahpet is a pickled tea salad that is very popular across Myanmar, especially with women. It is prepared by mixing the ingredients of Mandalay lahpet (except for the coconut) and adding fresh tomatoes, garlic, green chilis, and shredded cabbage, and is dressed with fish sauce, sesame or peanut oil, and lime juice. Lahpet with plain white rice is another student favorite, traditionally served at the end of every meal.

Some of the most popular commercial lahpet brands include Ayee Taung lahpet from Mandalay, Shwe Toak from Mogok, and Yuzana and Pinpyo Ywetnu from Yangon. Mixed ingredients of fried garlic, peas, peanuts and sesame have become available Hna-pyan gyaw (twice-fried) for convenience, although they are traditionally sold separately. Ayee Taung has been around for over 100 years. Its new recipes, such as Shu-shè (extra hot) and Kyetcheini (Red Cross), are quite popular.

Zayan lahpet is lahpet mixed with carambola (star fruit) and pickled young leaves cut together with coarse leaves. Many prefer Mogok lahpet as it uses only young tea leaves.

In the Northern Thai provinces of Chiang Mai, Chiang Rai and Mae Hong Son, lahpet thohk can be found at restaurants where Shan ethnic food is served. In Thai, it is called yam miang (ยำเหมียง), from Shan neng yam (ၼဵင်ႈယမ်း).

The town of Pyay (formerly Prome) is known for a local delicacy known as taw laphet (တောလက်ဖက်; lit. 'rural laphet') or Nibbinda laphet (နိဗ္ဗိန္ဒလက်ဖက်). Originating from Burmese nunneries in the area, the laphet is fermented from the leaves of the naywe (နရွဲ) tree, or kyettet (ကြက်တက်), the Combretum pilosum plant. The pulp is then tightly wrapped in dried banbwe (ဘန့်ပွေး) leaves and left soaking in regularly changed water for up to 2 years, before it is consumed. Taw laphet is otherwise consumed identically to traditional laphet.

== 2009 scandal ==
On 12 March 2009, the Ministry of Health of Myanmar announced that 43 brands of lahpet, including some popular brands, contained a chemical dye called Auramine O that is not permitted for use in food. This issue was believed to have arisen from wholesale dealers using cheaper chemical dyes instead of traditional food dyes. Consequently, the Malaysian government banned the sale of those brands of lahpet, while Singapore also ordered a ban on 20 brands of lahpet from Myanmar, including eight varieties marketed by Yuzana which had not been declared unsafe by the Burmese authorities. However, Thailand, which has a sizable Burmese population, did not announce any ban on lahpet brands. Tea businesses were hit by a dramatic drop in lahpet sales.

== See also ==
- Tea culture – Culture of tea
