= Momeik =

Momeik Möng Mit, Mongmit
- Town
- Location in Myanmar
- Coordinates: 23°7′0″N 96°41′4″E
- Country: Myanmar
- State: Shan State
- District: Mongmit District
- Township: Mongmit Township

Population (2005)
  - Ethnicities: Shan; Palaung
  - Religions: Buddhism
- Time zone: UTC+6.30 (MMT)

Momeik (Burmese: မိုးမိတ်; Shan: မိူင်းမိတ်ႈ), also known as Möng Mit or Mongmit, is a town on the Shweli River in northern Shan State, Myanmar. It is the capital of Mongmit District and the principal town of Mongmit Township.

== Transport ==
Momeik is connected by road to Mogok and its ruby mines, and via Mogok to Mandalay and Kyaukme, which is on the Mandalay-Lashio railway line. Momeik is also linked to Myitkyina, capital of Kachin State via Mabein and Bhamo. There is an airport for domestic flights to Momeik.

Mogok has an elevation of 4,000 feet (1,200 m), but Momeik is just 800 feet (240 m) above sea level and 28 miles (45 km) north of Mogok. 60 miles (97 km) by road to the west of Mogok lies Twinnge Village and the town of Thabeikkyin on the Ayeyarwady River (Irrawaddy). A direct road links Twinnge with Momeik.

== History ==
Möng Mit was founded in 1238. Thirteen villages of the Mogok Stone Tract were given to Möng Mit in 1420 as a reward for helping Yunnan raid Chiang Mai. In 1465, Nang Han Lung, the daughter-in-law of the Saopha (Sawbwa in Burmese) of Möng Mit, sent ruby as separate tribute from Hsenwi and succeeded in keeping Hsenwi's former possessions until 1484, when Mogok was ceded to the Burmese kings. Not until 1597 was the Saopha of Möng Mit forced to exchange Mogok and Kyatpyin with Tagaung. They were formally annexed by royal edict.

In 1542, the Shan ruler of Ava, Thohanbwa, marched with the Saophas of Möng Mit, Möng Yang, Hsipaw, Möng Kawng, Man Maw, and Yawnghwe to come to the aid of Prome against the Burmese, but they were defeated by Bayinnaung. In 1544, Hkonmaing, the Saopha of Onbaung-Hsipaw and Thohanbwa's successor on the throne of Ava, attempted to regain Prome with the help of Möng Mit, Möng Yang, Möng Nai, Hsenwi, Man Maw and Yawnghwe, but was defeated by King Tabinshwehti.

Bayinnaung succeeded in three campaigns in 1556–1559 to reduce the Shan states of Möng Mit (Momeik), Möng Yang (Mohnyin), Möng Kawng (Mogaung), Möng Pai (Mobyè), Samka (Saga), Lawksawk (Yatsauk), Yawnghwe, Hsipaw, Man Maw, Kalay, Chiang Mai, and Linzin (Vientiane) before he raided up the Taping and Shweli Rivers in 1562.

A bell donated by King Bayinnaung at Shwezigon Pagoda in Bagan has inscriptions in Burmese, Pali and Mon recording the conquest of Momeik and Hsipaw on 25 January 1557 and the building of a pagoda at Momeik on 8 February 1557.

=== British rule ===
The Saopha of Möng Mit had just died at the time of the British annexation in 1885, leaving a minor as heir, and the administration at Möng Mit was weak. It was included under the jurisdiction of the Commissioner of the Northern Division instead of the Superintendent of the Northern Shan States. A pretender named Hkam Leng came to claim the title, but was rejected by the ministers. The Burmese prince Saw Yan Naing, who had risen up against the British, fled to the area and joined forces with Hkam Leng, and caused a great deal of trouble in 1888–89 for the Hampshire Regiment stationed at Momeik.

Sao Hkun Hkio, Saopha of Möng Mit, was one of the seven Saophas on the Executive Committee of the Shan State Council formed after the first Panglong Conference in March 1946. On 16 January 1947, they sent two memoranda, whilst a Burmese delegation headed by Aung San was in London, to the British Labour government of Clement Attlee demanding equal political footing as Burma proper and full autonomy of the Federated Shan States. He was not one of the six Saophas who signed the Panglong Agreement on 12 February 1947. The Cambridge-educated Sao Hkun Hkio became Burma's longest-serving Foreign Minister after independence in 1948 until the military coup of Ne Win in 1962, with only short interruptions, the longest of which was from 1958 to 1960 during Ne Win's caretaker government.

=== After independence ===
The Shweli river valley and the hills around Momeik and Mogok had been strongholds of the Communist Party of Burma (CPB) as early as the 1950s, but only in 1968 did the 1st Brigade of the CPB People's Army regain control of the area, briefly capturing Momeik in 1977. Their plan to strike west to the plains north of Mandalay was thwarted by clashes with the Shan State Army and the Palaung State Liberation Army as well as government military offensives.

The Shan State Army-North's 3rd Brigade has been active in Momeik, Kyaukme, Hsipaw, Namtu and Lashio. It reached a cease-fire agreement with the Burmese military government (SLORC) in 1989, and its activities have been severely curtailed. In 2005, an attempt by the Shan State Army-South based near the Thai border to fill the vacuum left by the cease-fire in the north was thwarted by the Burmese army.

During the Myanmar Civil War, the town was temporarily taken by the Kachin Independence Army but retaken by the Tatmadaw on 2 January 2024. The junta counter-offensive destroyed large parts of the town and the fighting left scores of civilians dead. The Ta'ang National Liberation Army launched a renewed offensive on the town in July 2024, as part of their resumption of Operation 1027. The TNLA withdrew from Momeik after a China-brokered ceasefire on 29 October 2025.

== Economy ==
=== Minerals ===
Momeik is famous for its precious and semi-precious stones. Elbaite, a variant of Rubellite (Tourmaline or Anyant meaning 'inferior' in Burmese) including the "mushroom" tourmaline, and Petalite or Salinwa are mined in this region.

Diamond found in Momeik region is believed to derive from primary sources in northwestern Australia but is distinguishable from similar stones from eastern Australia. Gold mining in the area is being operated by Asia World and Shweli Yadana.

=== Agriculture ===
Mogok ruby mines rely on the staple Momeik rice. Hsinshweli strain high-yield rice as well as sugar cane, rubber, physic nut, jengkol bean and avocado are cultivated in the region.
