= Pa Laung Self-Administered Zone =

Coordinates: 22°58′08″N 97°10′14″E

Pa Laung Self-Administered Zone ပလောင် ကိုယ်ပိုင်အုပ်ချုပ်ခွင့်ရ ဒေသ
- Self-administered zone
- Flag

- Location in Shan State
- Country: Myanmar
- State: Shan State
- No. of Townships: 2
- Established: 20 August 2010
- Capital: Namhsan

Area
  - Total: 4,015 km^{2} (1,550 sq mi)

Population (2014)
  - Total: 110,805
  - Density: 27.60/km^{2} (71.48/sq mi)
- Demonym: Palaung
- Time zone: UTC+6.30 (MMT)

The Palaung Self-Administered Zone (Burmese: ပလောင် ကိုယ်ပိုင်အုပ်ချုပ်ခွင့်ရ ဒေသ [pəlàʊɰ̃ kòbàɪɰ̃ ʔoʊʔtɕʰoʊʔ kʰwɪ̰ɰ̃ja̰ dèθa̰]) is a self-administered zone consisting of two townships in Shan State: Its capital is the town of Namhsan.

== History ==
The Pa Laung Self-Administered Zone (SAZ) was created as a separately administered unit by the 2008 Constitution. The Pa Laung SAZ was split off from Kyaukme District and its official name was announced by decree on 20 August 2010. It is to be self-administered by the Palaung people.

During the current Myanmar civil war in December 2023, the zone came under the control of the Ta'ang National Liberation Army during Operation 1027 following their capture of Namhsan and Mantong.

== Government and politics ==
Under the terms of the 2008 Burmese constitution, the Pa Laung Self-Administered Zone should be administered by a Leading Body, which consisted of at least ten members including Shan State Hluttaw (Assembly) members elected from the Zone and members nominated by the Burmese Armed Forces. The Leading Body has both executive and legislative functions and is led by a Chairperson. The Leading Body has competence in ten areas of policy, including urban and rural development, road construction and maintenance, and public health.

== Administrative divisions ==
townships of Palaung SAZ Namhsan Township Mantong Township

The zone is divided into two townships that were previously part of Kyaukme District:

- Namhsan Township
- Mantong Township
