= Mabein Township =

Mabein Township မဘိမ်းမြို့နယ်
- Township
- Location in Mongmit district (in red)
- Coordinates: 23°28′0″N 96°37′0″E
- Country: Myanmar
- State: Shan State
- District: Mongmit District
- Elevation: 436 ft (133 m)
- Time zone: UTC+6:30 (MMT)

Mabein Township (Burmese: မဘိမ်းမြို့နယ်) is a township of Mongmit District (formerly part of Kyaukme District) in northwestern Shan State of eastern Myanmar. The principal town is Mabein.
