= Mongmit District =

Mongmit District မိုးမိတ်ခရိုင်
- District
- Momeik District
- Coordinates: 23.356°N 96.702°E
- Country: Myanmar
- Region: Shan State
- No. of Townships: 2
- Capital: Momeik
- Time zone: UTC+6.30 (MMT)

Mongmit District, also known as Momeik District (Burmese: မိုးမိတ်ခရိုင်), is district in northern Shan State, Myanmar created by decree in 2015; which was formerly part of Kyaukme District. Its administrative center is the city of Momeik.

== Administrative divisions ==
Townships in Mongmit district Mongmit Township Mabein Township

The District has the following townships

- Mongmit Township
- Mabein Township
