= Kyaukme =

Kyaukme ၵျွၵ်းမႄး
- Town
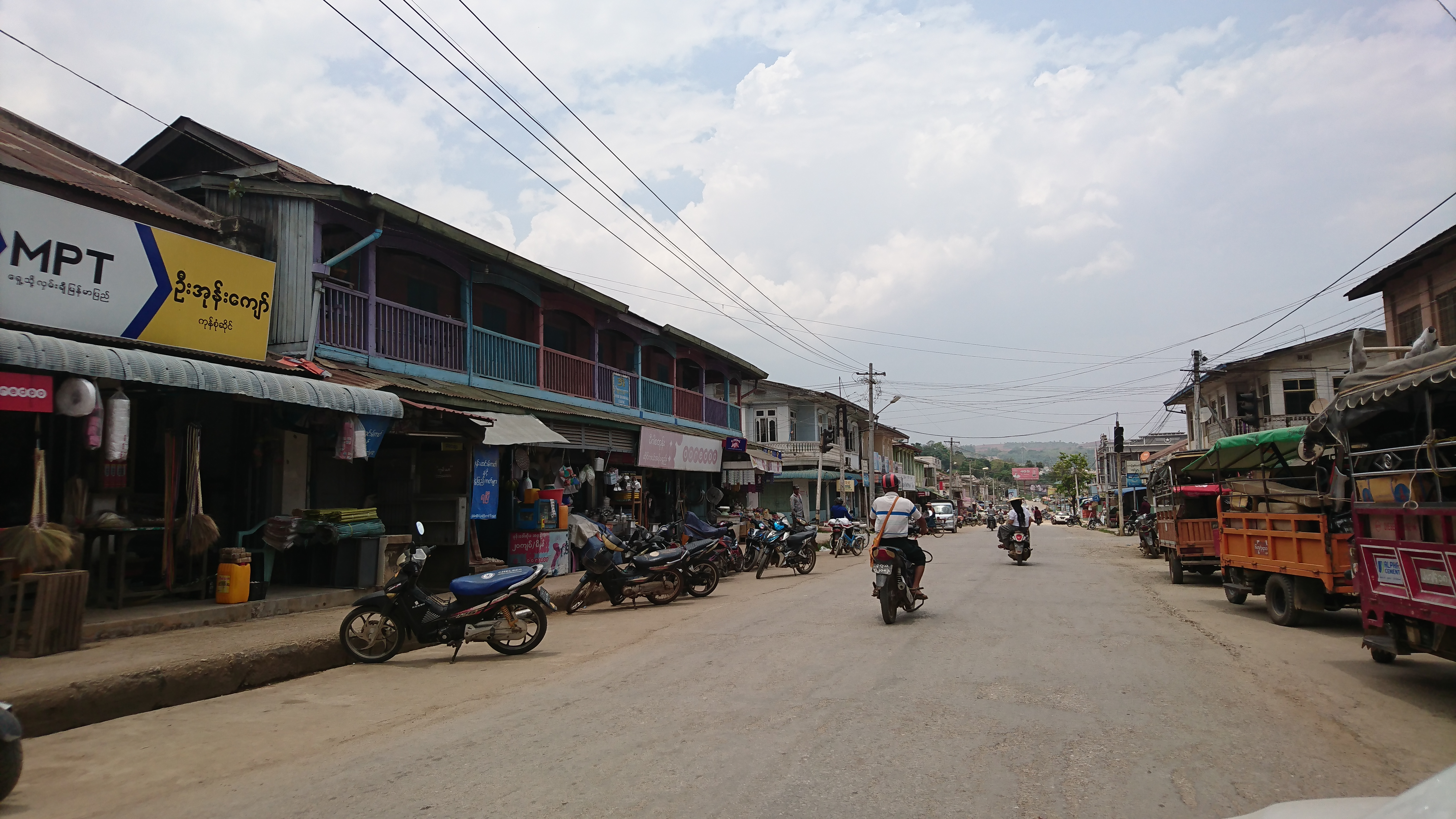
- Downtown of Kyaukme

- Location in Myanmar
- Coordinates: 22°32′21″N 97°1′42″E
- Country: Myanmar
- State: Shan State
- District: Kyaukme District
- Township: Kyaukme Township

Population (2014)
  - Total: 39,930
  - Ethnicities: Shan Palaung Bamar Gurkha
  - Religions: Buddhism
- Time zone: UTC+6.30 (MST)

Kyaukme (Burmese: ကျောက်မဲမြို့ [tɕaʊʔ mɛ́ mjo̰]) is a town in northern Shan State of Burma. It is situated on the Mandalay - Lashio road, after Pyin Oo Lwin and Nawnghkio, and before Hsipaw, on what is now the Mandalay - Muse road, part of the Asian Highway route 14 (AH14). It is also connected to Momeik (Mongmit) in the Shweli River valley and Mogok with its ruby mines. Kyaukme can be reached by train on the Mandalay-Lashio railway line. As of 2014, the population was 39,930.

== History ==
During the Second World War, the B-25s and P-47s of the USAAF Tenth Air Force carried out bombing raids between October 1944 and March 1945 on Kyaukme station, rolling stock, tracks and roads as well as Japanese troop concentrations in the area.

On 12 February 1945, British and American units of Lt Gen Sultan's Northern Combat Area Command (NCAC) were advancing south towards Lashio and Kyaukme but were being held up by heavy fighting near the Shweli River. Kyaukme was captured on 31 March 1945 by the British 36th Infantry Division and Chinese 6th Army units, which cleared the Burma Road from Mandalay to Lashio.

During Operation 1027 of the Myanmar Civil War, the town experienced an influx of people fleeing from fighting from rural areas in the township. During renewed fighting in June 2024, the town was the site of clashes between junta forces and the Ta'ang National Liberation Army, who eventually took control of the town.

The town has now been recaptured by the Tatmadaw after a 21-day offensive against the TNLA on 1 October 2025.

== Climate ==
Climate data for Kyaukme, elevation 759 m (2,490 ft), (1983–2010)
| Month | Jan | Feb | Mar | Apr | May | Jun | Jul | Aug | Sep | Oct | Nov | Dec | Year |
|---|---|---|---|---|---|---|---|---|---|---|---|---|---|
| Mean daily maximum °C (°F) | 24.7 (76.5) | 27.7 (81.9) | 31.0 (87.8) | 32.9 (91.2) | 31.0 (87.8) | 29.8 (85.6) | 29.0 (84.2) | 29.1 (84.4) | 29.3 (84.7) | 28.5 (83.3) | 25.9 (78.6) | 23.8 (74.8) | 28.6 (83.4) |
| Mean daily minimum °C (°F) | 6.5 (43.7) | 8.2 (46.8) | 11.8 (53.2) | 16.2 (61.2) | 19.6 (67.3) | 21.5 (70.7) | 21.7 (71.1) | 21.5 (70.7) | 20.6 (69.1) | 18.3 (64.9) | 13.0 (55.4) | 8.3 (46.9) | 15.6 (60.1) |
| Average precipitation mm (inches) | 6.5 (0.26) | 9.3 (0.37) | 12.9 (0.51) | 62.3 (2.45) | 252.4 (9.94) | 418.4 (16.47) | 429.9 (16.93) | 391.2 (15.40) | 262.1 (10.32) | 176.1 (6.93) | 79.4 (3.13) | 13.7 (0.54) | 2,114.2 (83.25) |
Source: Norwegian Meteorological Institute

== Economy ==
Kyaukme has been, since before British colonial rule, the main trading centre for tea from Tawngpeng, and the hills around Kyaukme itself, inhabited by the Palaung.

Burma and China signed a contract in August 2003 for a hydro power project. A dam is under construction on the Shweli River near Namhkam aiming to supply electricity to Kyaukme, Hsipaw, Lashio and Namtu.

== Health ==
Malaria is endemic in the area, and its control has been the concern of the WHO since the 1950s. Women of reproductive age (15-49) in Kyaukme and Nawnghkio have been targeted for improvement in reproductive health in the community in collaboration with Japan. A study mission was started in June 2004, with the project continuing for the period January 2005- December 2009.

== Politics ==
The Shan State Army - North (SSA-North)'s Third Brigade has been active in Mongmit, Kyaukme, Hsipaw, Namtu and Lashio. It reached a cease-fire agreement with the Burmese military government (SLORC) in 1989, and its activities have been severely curtailed.

During the Saffron Revolution, on 24 September 2007, 37 Buddhist monks in Kyaukme staged a peaceful protest march which ended without interference from the authorities, but they were prevented from repeating the protest the next day.

== Notable people ==
Sai Ohn Kyaw (born 1944) - politician

== Gallery ==
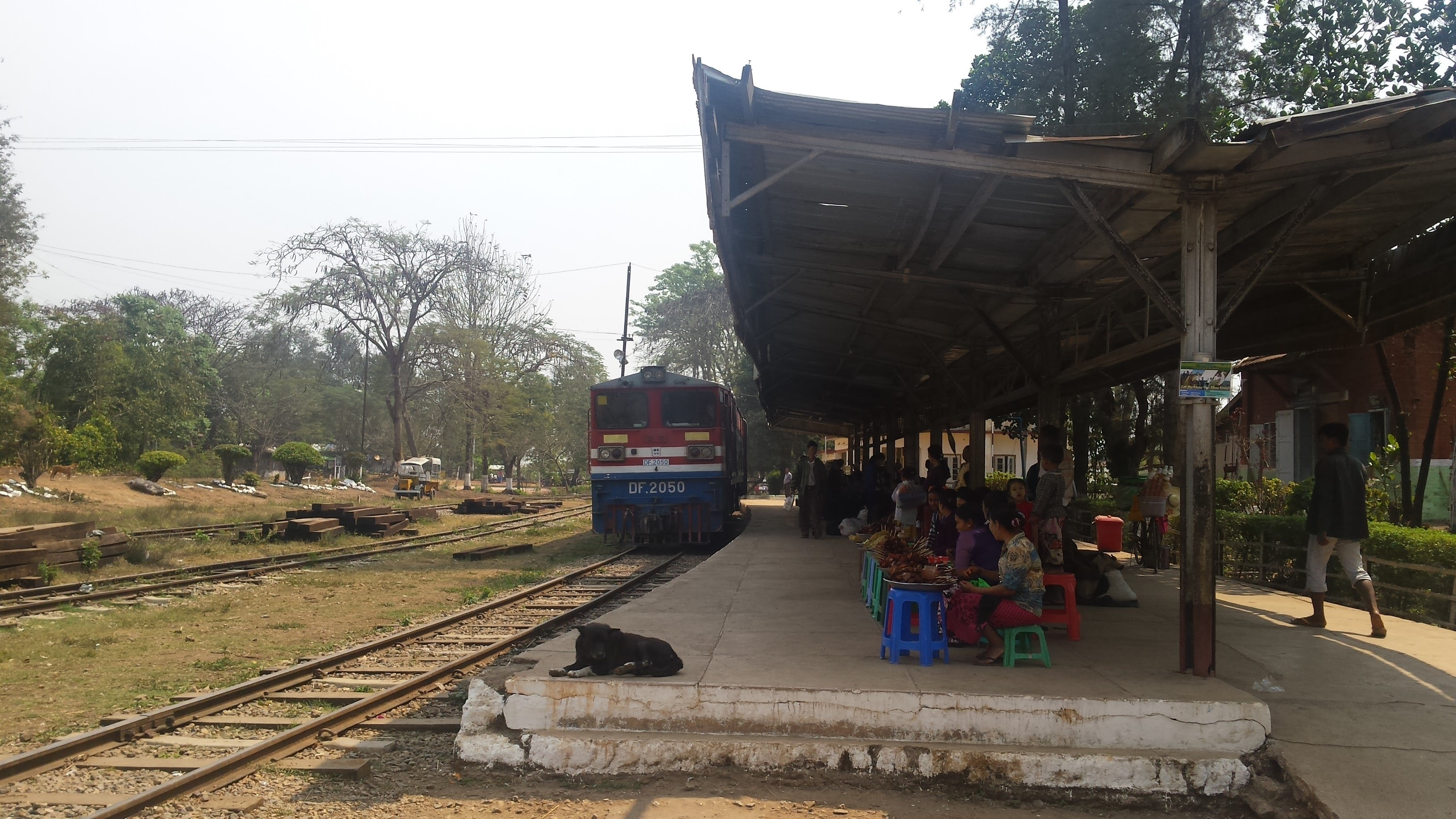
Train station (2017)

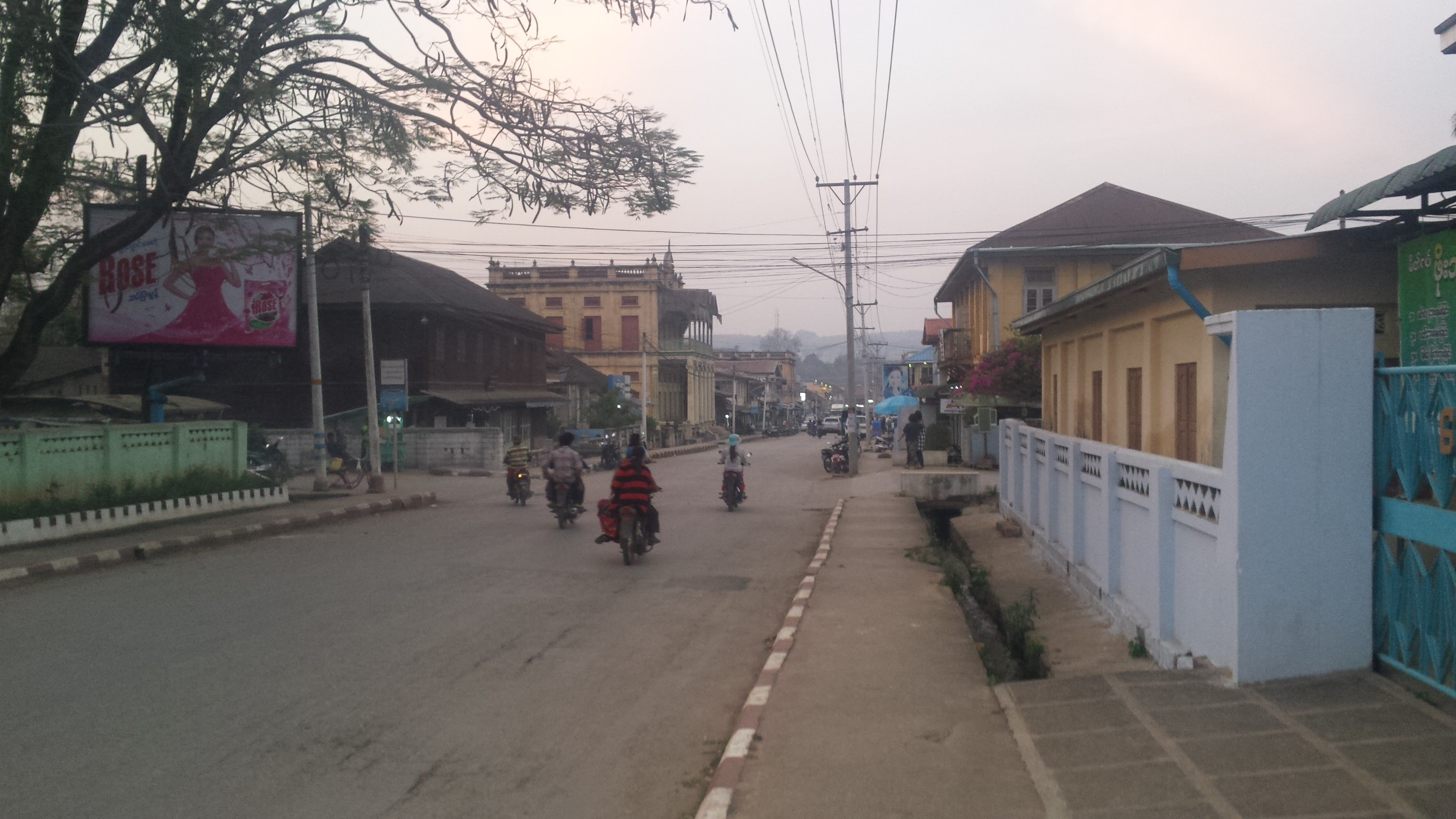
Mogoke-Kyaukme Road

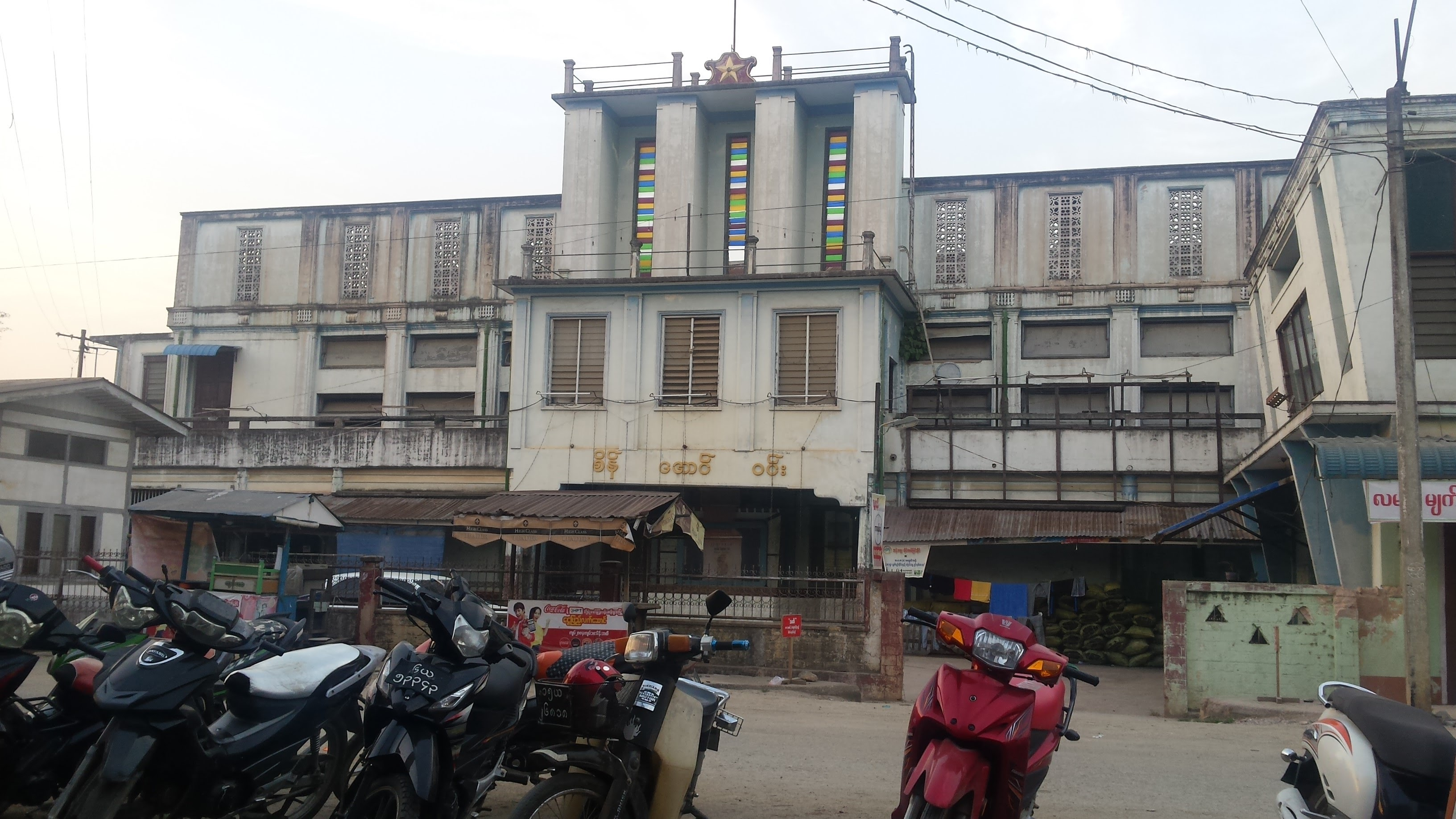
Building in city centre

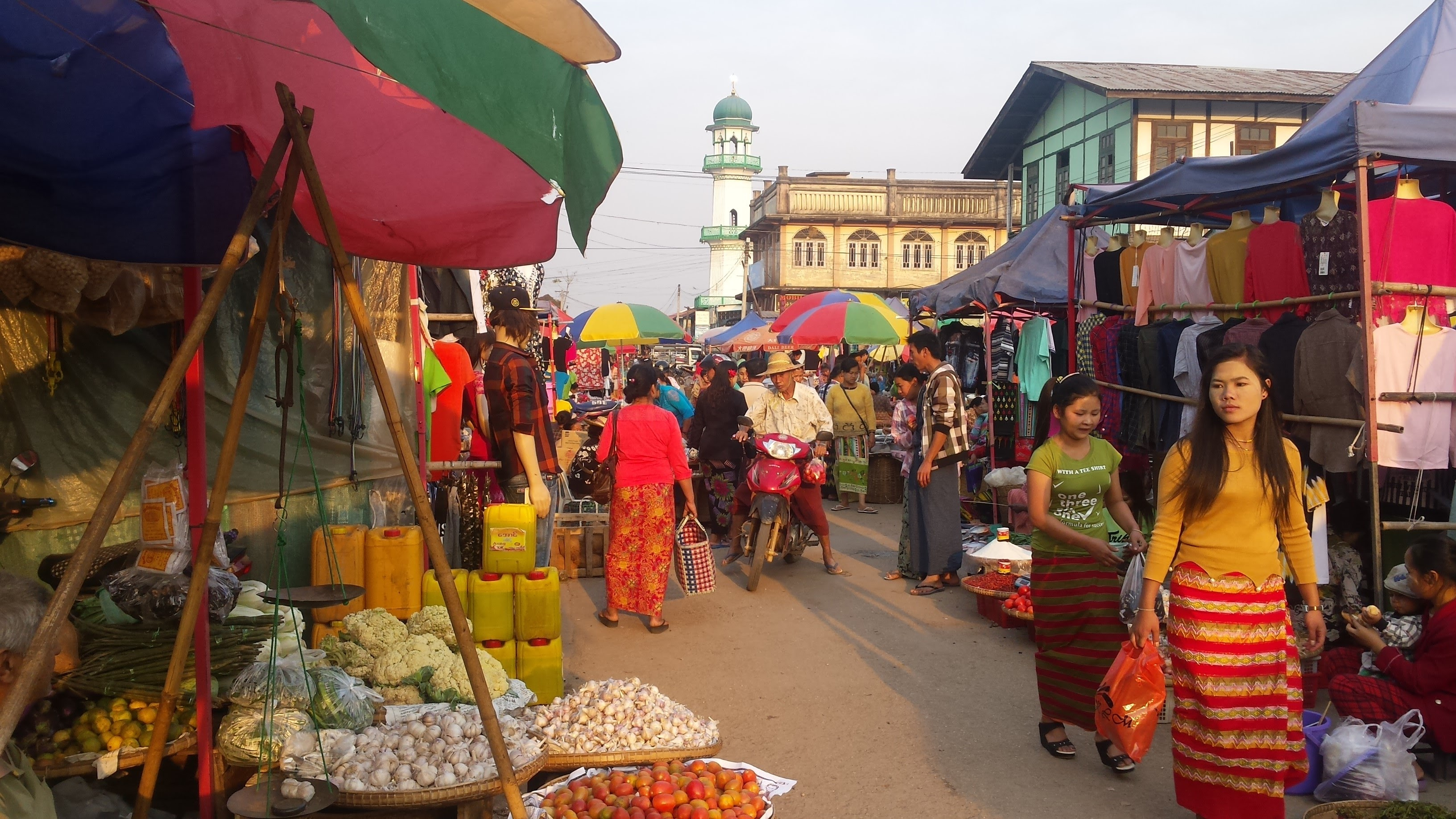
Local market

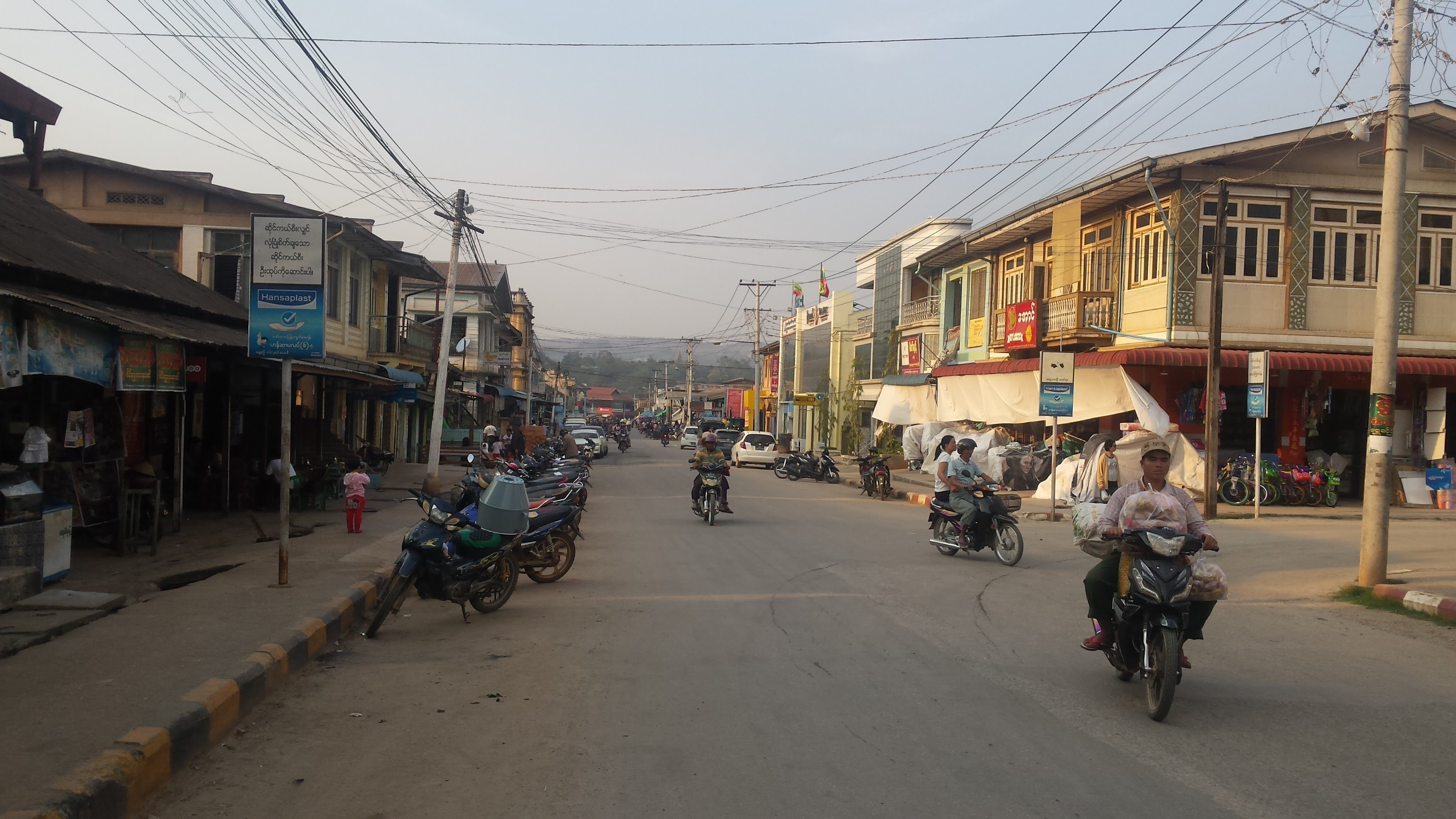
Main road (2017)
