= Mantong, Myanmar =

Town in Shan State, Myanmar

Manton မန်တုံ Mantong
- Location in Myanmar
- Coordinates: 23°15′02″N 97°07′17″E
- Country: Myanmar
- State: Shan State
- Self-administered zone: Pa Laung
- Township: Mantong Township

Area
  - Total: 0.77 sq mi (2 km^{2})

Population (2019)
  - Total: 3,565
  - Density: 4,620/sq mi (1,783/km^{2})
  - Religions: Buddhism
- Time zone: UTC+6.30 (MMT)

Mantong (Burmese: မန်တုံမြို့)is the principal town of Mantong Township, one of the two townships in the Pa Laung Self-Administered Zone.

The town is 16 miles (26 km) from Bawdwin Mine in Namtu Township. The town is in a mountainous area and lies east of the Shweli River, close to the Kokang Self-Administered Zone.

During the current Myanmar civil war in December 2023, the town was the last State Administration Council-controlled territory in the Pa Laung Self-Administered Zone to be captured by the Ta'ang National Liberation Army during Operation 1027.
