= Wards of Myanmar =

Type of administrative subdivision in Myanmar

A ward (Burmese: ရပ်ကွက်; yatkwet, IPA: [jaʔ kwɛʔ]) is a fifth-level administrative subdivision of Myanmar's urban cities and towns, below the fourth-level subdivision of town.

As of December 2019, there are 3,470 wards in Myanmar. In rural areas, the equivalent fifth-level unit is the village.

== See also ==
- Administrative divisions of Burma
