= Namhsan Township =

Namhsan
- Township
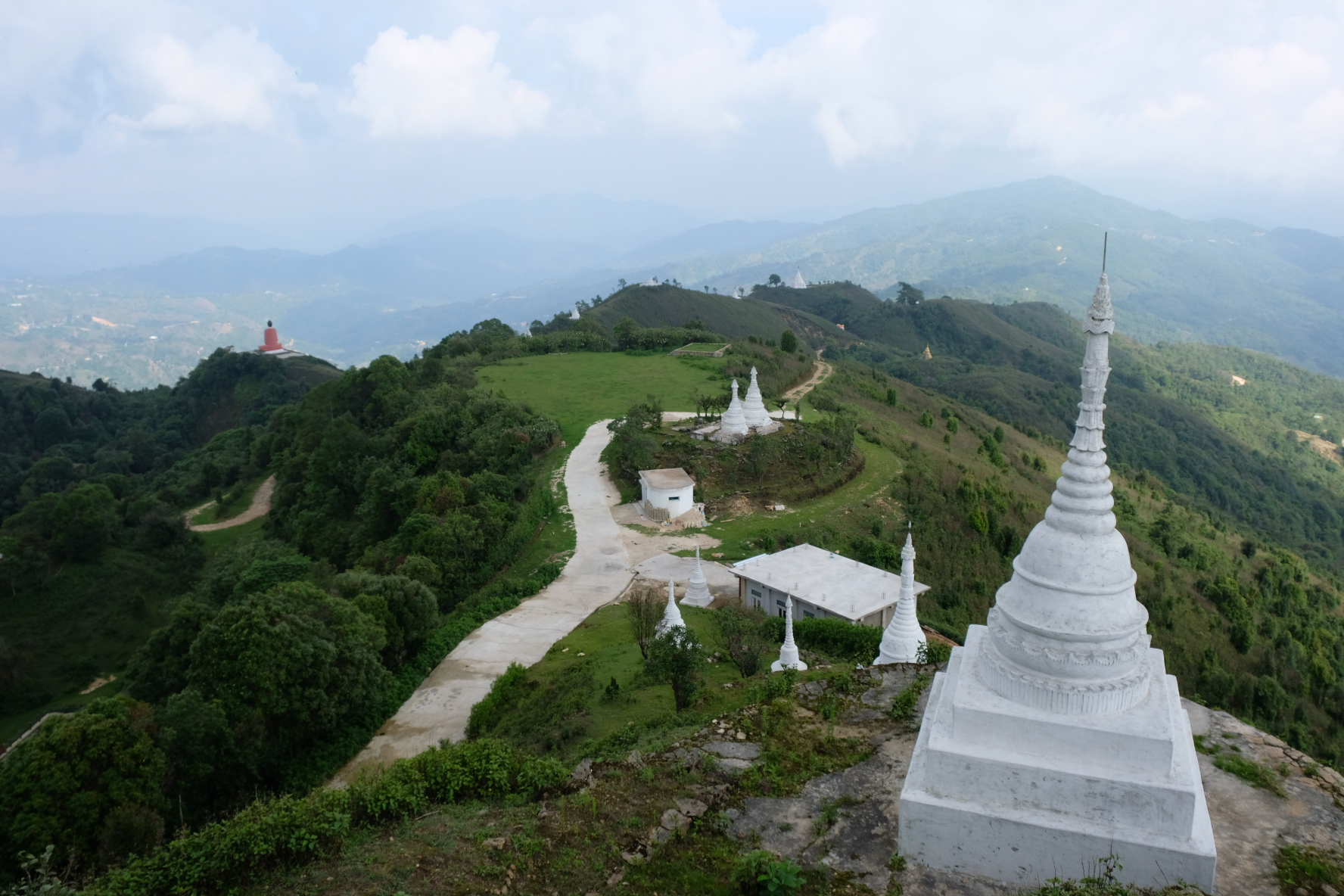

- Location in Palaung SAZ (in red)
- Coordinates: 22°57′0″N 97°9′0″E
- Country: Myanmar
- State: Shan State
- Self-administered zone: Pa Laung

Area
  - Total: 1,502 km^{2} (580 sq mi)
- Elevation: 1,625 m (5,331 ft)

Population (2014)
  - Total: 72,204
  - Density: 48.07/km^{2} (124.5/sq mi)
- Time zone: UTC+6:30 (MMT)

Namhsan Township (Burmese: နမ့်ဆန်မြို့နယ်) is a township of the Pa Laung Self-Administered Zone in the Shan State of eastern Myanmar (Burma). The principal town and administrative seat is Namhsan.

Prior to August 2010, Kyaukme District included Namhsan Township and Mantong Township; and both of them were transferred that month to the newly created Pa Laung Self-Administered Zone.

To prevent confusion with Nansang Township in southern Shan State, it is sometimes disambiguated as Nan San (North) Township.
