= Sai Ohn Kyaw =

Burmese politician

Member of the Amyotha Hluttaw
- Incumbent
- Assumed office 1 February 2016
- Constituency: Shan State No. 4

Personal details
- Born: 4 June 1944 (age 82) Kyaukme, Shan State, Burma
- Party: Shan Nationalities League for Democracy
- Spouse: Nan Sein Nu
- Parent(s): Saw Sein (father); Kham San (mother)
- Education: Mandalay University B.Sc (Phys)

Sai Ohn Kyaw (Burmese: စိုင်းအုန်းကျော်, born 4 August 1944) is a Burmese politician who currently serves as a House of Nationalities member of parliament for Shan State No. 4 constituency.

== Early life and education ==
He was born on 4 August 1944 in Kyaukme, Shan State, Burma. He graduated with B.Sc from Mandalay University.

== Political career ==
He is a member of the Shan Nationalities League for Democracy. In the 2015 Myanmar general election, he was elected as an Amyotha Hluttaw MP and elected representative from Shan State No. 4 parliamentary constituency.
