= Mantong Township =

Mantong
- Township
- Location in Palaung SAZ (in red)

- Location within Myanmar
- Coordinates: 23°15′0″N 97°7′0″E
- Country: Myanmar
- State: Shan State
- Self-administered zone: Pa Laung (de jure)

Area
  - Total: 975.75 sq mi (2,527.18 km^{2})
- Elevation: 4,121 ft (1,256 m)

Population (2019)
  - Total: 35,916
  - Density: 36.809/sq mi (14.212/km^{2})
  - Ethnicities: Palaung; Kachin
  - Religions: Buddhism
- Time zone: UTC+6:30 (MMT)

Mantong Township ((Burmese: မန်တုံမြို့နယ်); also known as Manton Township and Mantung Township) is a township of the Pa Laung Self-Administered Zone in the Shan State of eastern Myanmar. The principal town and administrative seat is Mantong.

Prior to August 2010, Kyaukme District included both Mantong Township and Namhsan Township; and both of them were transferred that month to the newly created Pa Laung Self-Administered Zone.

It was reported that the town was captured by the Ta’ang National Liberation Army (TNLA) on 23 December 2023
