= Tawngpeng State =

Former Shan State in Burma

Coordinates: 22°57′N 97°9′E

Tawngpeng
- State of the Shan States
- 1793–1959
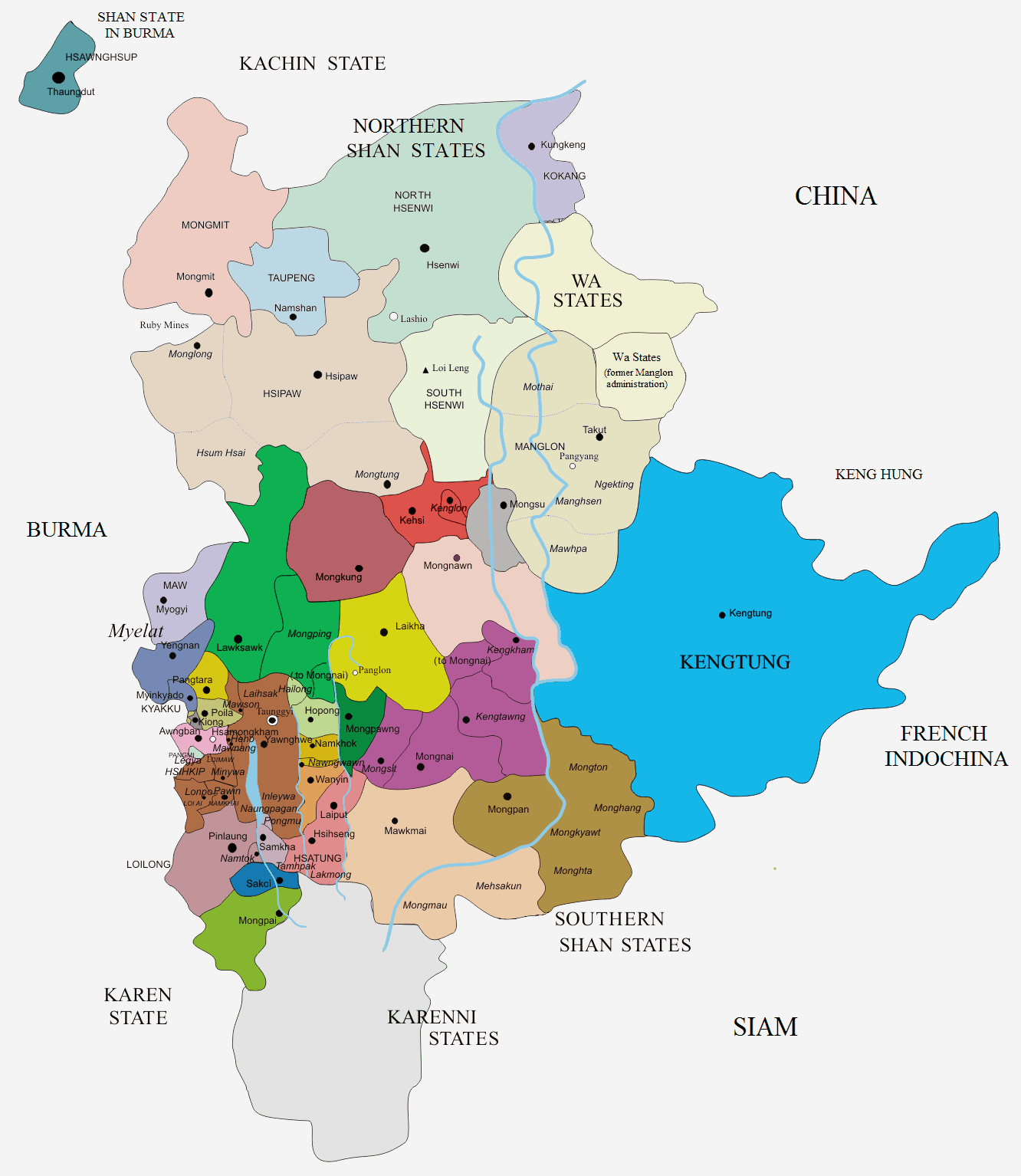
- Tawngpeng State in a map of the Shan States
- Capital: Namhsan
- Area
  - 1901: 2,015 km^{2} (778 sq mi)
- Population
  - 1901: 22,681
- History
  - State founded: 1793
  - Disestablished: Abdication of the last ruler 1959
Succeeded by
Shan State

Tawngpeng (Loi Lung in Shan) was a Shan state in what is today Myanmar. It belonged to the Northern Shan States. The capital was Namhsan (Om-yar).

== History ==
The predecessor state was named Pappatasara. Not much is known about the history of the state before the 19th century, all that is available are legends.

Tawngpeng state was founded in 1753; it was the only Palaung kingdom in the former Shan States, the ruling family belonging to this ethnic group as well, although adopting the paraphernalia and the style of ethnic Shan rulers. The people of the area are predominantly of the Ka-tur (Samlong) tribe. The main industry of this mostly hilly state was tea production. Before British rule in Burma two successive saophas were executed and a further one was murdered.

=== Rulers ===
The rulers of Tawngpeng State bore the title Saopha.

==== Saophas ====
- 1753 - 1760 Ta Dwe Ba (b. 1681 - d. 1760)
- 1760 - 1764 Ba Hkun Mya (b. 1690 - d. 1764)
- 1764 - 1775 Ba Hkun Saing (b. 1700 - d. 1775)
- 1775 - 1781 Ba Dwe Taw (b. 1701 - d. 1781)
- 1781 Ba Loi Lio (b. 1745 - d. 1810)
- 1781 - 1819 Ba Hkun Kein Möng (d. 1819)
- 1819 - 1837 Ba Hkun Hso (b. 1748 - d. 1837)
- 1837 - 1846 Ba Hkun Tan Möng (b. 1770 - d. 1846)
- 1847 - 4 Sep 1858 Shwe Ok Hka (Shwe Taung Kyaw)
- 1858 - 1861 Hkun Hsa (Ba Hkam Hkun Shinye) (b. 1774 - d. 1865)
- 1861 Hkun Gya (d. 1861)
- 1861 - 1865 Hkun Aung Hla (d. 1865)
- 1865 - 1880 Hkam Kwan
- 1880 - 1887 Hkun Hkam Möng (Hkam Mon) (b. 1821 - d. 1887)
- 1888 - 1895 Hkam Tan Möng (Hkun Kyan) (d. 1895)
- 1895 - 1926 Hkun Hsan Gawn (b. 1871 - d. 1926)
- Aug 1926 - 1952 Hkun Pan Sing (b. 1894 - d. 1975)
