= Kyaukme District =

Kyaukme
- District
- Location in Shan State
- Coordinates: 22°32′00″N 97°2′00″E
- Country: Myanmar
- State: Shan State
- Elevation: 775 m (2,543 ft)
- Time zone: UTC+6.30 (MST)

Kyaukme District is a district (kharuing) of northern Shan State in Myanmar (Burma). It contains four townships and its capital is Kyaukme.

== Administrative divisions ==
As of 2015, Kyaukme District contained the following townships and subtownships.

- Hsipaw Township
- Kyaukme Township
  - Mong Lon Subtownship
  - Mong Ngaw Subtownship
- Namtu Township
- Nawnghkio Township

Prior to August 2010, Kyaukme District also included Mantong Township and Namhsan Township, which both were transferred that month to the newly created Pa Laung Self-Administered Zone.

As of 2001, it consisted of 9 towns and 1946 villages. Prior to 2015, Kyaukme District also consisted of the following townships, which formed to become Mongmit District:

- Mabein Township
- Mongmit Township
