= Htay Myint =

Burmese businessman and politician

- ဌေးမြင့်

Pyithu Hluttaw MP
- In office 31 January 2011 – 29 January 2016
- Succeeded by: Soe Paing Htay
- Constituency: Myeik Township
- Majority: 74,843 (67.08%)

Personal details
- Born: 6 February 1955 (age 71) Mergui, Burma
- Party: Union Solidarity and Development Party
- Spouse: Aye Aye Maw
- Relations: Lay Myint (brother); Win Myint (brother); Kyin Toe (brother); Pu Kyi (brother)
- Children: Zarchi Htay (daughter)
- Occupation: Businessman
- Companies: Yuzana Company, Southern Myanmar United Football Club

Wunna Kyawhtin Htay Myint (Burmese: ဌေးမြင့်) is the chairman of the Yuzana Company, a major conglomerate in Myanmar (Burma) and served as Member of Parliament in the Pyithu Hluttaw for Myeik Township from 2011 to 2016. He also owns the Southern Myanmar United Football Club. In 1994, he founded the Yuzana Company, which is involved in the transportation, construction, hotel, palm oil and rubber production industries.
