= Yuzana Company =

Yuzana Company Limited
- Native name: ယုဇနကုမ္ပဏီလီမိတက်
- Industry: Conglomerate
- Founded: 1994; 32 years ago
- Founder: Htay Myint
- Headquarters: Yangon, Myanmar
- Number of locations: Yuzana Centre, Shwegondaing Road, Bahan Township
- Key people: Htay Myint, Pu Kyi
- Divisions: Yuzana Construction; Yuzana Hotels
- Website: www.yuzanahotels.com

Yuzana Company Limited (Burmese: ယုဇနကုမ္ပဏီလီမိတက်) is a Burmese company involved in the construction, agriculture, hospitality, real estate and fishery industries.

Yuzana Company was established in 1994 by Htay Myint, a businessman with close ties to Khin Nyunt, a former Burmese prime minister and Than Shwe, the former head of the country's military junta. Yuzana began as a fisheries venture in Myeik (Mergui) in Southern Burma's Taninthayi Division. Yuzana Company also owns palm oil, sugarcane, teak, physic nut (Jatropha curcas), and rubber plantations.

Yuzana is one of Burma's largest producers of lahpet (pickled tea leaves), a national dish.

Yuzana is also one of four indigenous Burmese companies that harvests marine shrimps, in a 50 acres (20 ha) farm.

== Projects ==
In 1994, Yuzana Company opened one of Burma's largest shopping centers, Yuzana Supermarket, in Rangoon. In 1997, it opened Yuzana Hotel, a 198-room hotel in Rangoon. In the 1990s, the company constructed Yuzana Garden City, a suburban housing development in Rangoon.

In 2007, Yuzana Company was awarded a build-operate-transfer government contract to redevelop the 120 miles (190 km) Stilwell Road, which linked northeast India and China during World War II and collect toll and tax fees for 30 years.

In November 2010, Yuzana Company opened a 20,000 square feet (1,900 m^{2}) tapioca powder factory in Kachin State, near the company's plantations in the Hukawng Valley. The factory is reported to be the largest in Southeast Asia.

In 2011, Yuzana Company was named as one of the subcontractors for a major development project, to establish a special economic zone in Dawei.

=== Tourism ===
Yuzana Company currently operates three hotels in Myanmar:

1. Yuzana Hotel - Bahan Township, Yangon
2. Yuzana Garden Hotel - Mingala Taungnyunt Township, Yangon
3. Yuzana Resort Hotel - Ngwesaung

== Controversy ==
Yuzana Company, as well as its founder Htay Myint, are currently subject to American investment sanctions.

The company has received preferential government loans to subsidize financially unsound projects.

=== Land confiscation and habitat destruction ===
Since 2006, Yuzana Company has seized over 400,000 acres (1,600 km^{2}) of land from Kachin State farmers to plant sugarcane and cassava in massive mono-crop plantations. That year, the Burmese government granted Yuzana Company a land concession to develop an agricultural development zone in Kachin State's Hukawng Valley (much of it in the Hukawng Valley Tiger Reserve), in Danai and Hpakant Townships. Within the boundaries of the land concession were seven villages that housed approximately 5,000 farmers.

In August 2012, after negotiations with the National Democratic Front, Htay Myint elected to return a more than 1,000 acres (400 ha) of farmland to farmers in Hpakant Township. The farmers had sued Yuzana Company for the uncompensated confiscation of 1,038 acres (420 ha) of farmland in 2010. 200,000 acres (81,000 ha) of the plantations are in the Hukawng Valley Tiger Reserve.

The company has razed forests and destroyed animal corridors in the world's largest tiger reserve. In 2011, Kachin News Group, an ethnic news organization reported that the Burmese military had been stockpiling weapons in Yuzana Company's crop plantations in the Hukawng Valley.

In July 2012, Yuzana Company was named as one of the perpetrators involved in illegal farmland seizures (initially part of a contract farming scheme) in Yangon Region's Dagon Seikkan and East Dagon Townships.
