= Namhsan =

Namhsan နမ့်ဆန်မြို့
- Town
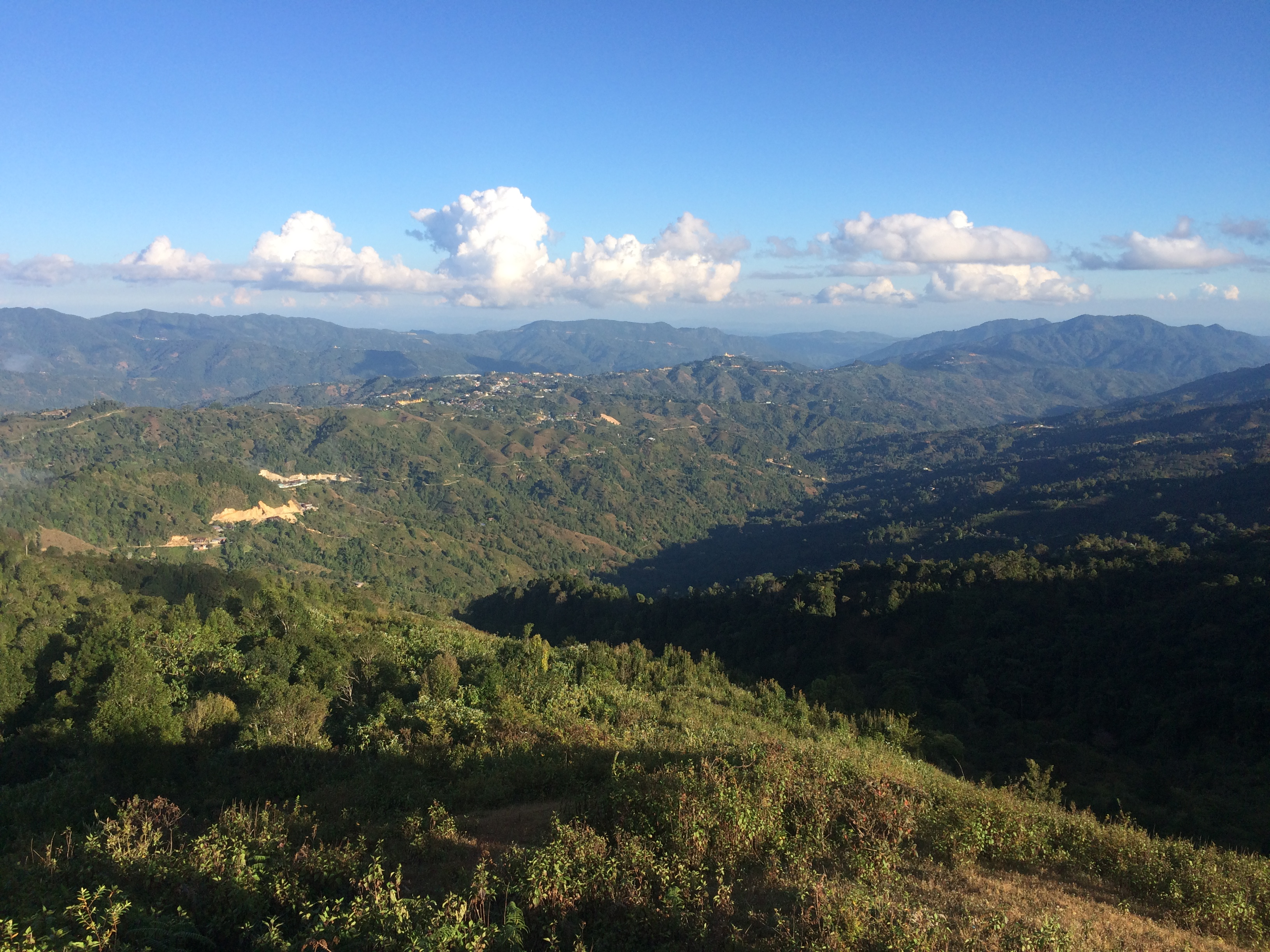

- Location in Myanmar
- Coordinates: 22°57′54″N 97°9′48″E
- Country: Myanmar
- State: Shan State
- Self-administered zone: Pa Laung
- Township: Namhsan Township
- Control: Ta'ang National Liberation Army

Population (2005)
  - Ethnicities: Palaung
  - Religions: Buddhism Hinduism
- Time zone: UTC+6.30 (MMT)

Namhsan (Burmese: နမ့်ဆန်မြို့; Palaung: Om-yar; Chinese: 南散), also spelt Nam Hsan, Namsan, or Nam San, is the capital of the Pa Laung Self-Administered Zone and Namhsan Township in northern Shan State, Myanmar (formerly Burma). The town is a popular starting point for trekking to Hsipaw.

Besides its Palaung residents, the town is also populated by Karen, Lisu, and Shan ethnic tribal groups, as well as Indian and Chinese residents.

== History ==
During British rule in Burma (Myanmar), Namhsan was the capital of Tawngpeng State, a Palaung substate of the Shan States in British Burma; and the only Palaung kingdom in the former Shan States. The people of the town were predominantly of the Ka-tur (Samlong) tribe. The people of the tribe are often referred to as the Golden Palaung (Shwe Palaung) because of their coloured belts. Historically, they wore silver belts for special occasions, but aluminum has since been used instead.

Their language is called Shwe, a language variant that is only partially intelligible by other Palaungic language speakers. In Shwe, Namhsan means trembling waters and the town is thought to be named that way because it is situated on a marsh which gets flooded during heavy rains. During the 1920s and 1930s, the town prospered from the presence of silver mines and the tea grown in the area. The tribe was heavily studied by anthropologist Mrs. Leslie Milne.

On 15 December 2023 the town fell under the control of the Ta'ang National Liberation Army (TNLA) rebel group after two weeks of fighting against the military junta State Administration Council (SAC).
