= Kyaukme Township =

Kyaukme Township ကျောက်မဲမြို့နယ်
- Township
- Location in Kyaukme district
- Coordinates: 23°32′0″N 97°2′0″E
- Country: Myanmar
- State: Shan State
- District: Kyaukme District
- Elevation: 2,543 ft (775 m)
- Time zone: UTC+6:30 (MMT)

Kyaukme Township is a township of Kyaukme District in the Shan State of eastern Myanmar. The principal town and administrative center is Kyaukme. The only other town is Mong Ngaw, located in the northeast corner of the township.
