= Administrative divisions of Myanmar =

- Category: Unitary state
- Location: Republic of the Union of Myanmar
- Number: 7 regions 7 states 1 union territory (as of 2024)
- Populations: 286,627 (Kayah State) - 7,360,703 (Yangon Region)
- Areas: 7,054 km^{2} (2,724 sq mi) (Naypyidaw Union Territory) - 155,801 km^{2} (60,155 sq mi) (Shan State)
- Government: Government of Myanmar
- Subdivisions: Self-administered division; Cities; Self-administered zones; Districts; Townships; Towns; Wards; Village tract; Villages

According to the 2008 Constitution, the Republic of the Union of Myanmar constitutes seven regions, seven states and one union territory. The constitution also mentions one self-administered division and five self-administered zones which are parts of some of the states and regions. In addition to these constitutional administrative subdivisions, there are also special regions which are extraconstitutional autonomous territories controlled by ethnic armed groups and recognized by the central government after the cease-fire agreements of 1989 and 1990s.

== Structural hierarchy ==
Hierarchy according to the Article 51 of the 2008 Constitution
Not mentioned in the constitution but recognized by laws and regulations

Union level
The Republic နိုင်ငံတော်
First level
Union Territory ပြည်ထောင်စုနယ်မြေ		State ပြည်နယ်	Region တိုင်းဒေသကြီး	State ပြည်နယ်	Region တိုင်းဒေသကြီး
Union Territory ပြည်ထောင်စုနယ်မြေ		State ပြည်နယ်	Region တိုင်းဒေသကြီး	Sub-State ပြည်နယ်ခွဲ	Sub-Division တိုင်းခွဲ
Second level
District ခရိုင်	City မြို့တော်	Special Region အထူးဒေသ	Self-Administered Division ကိုယ်ပိုင်အုပ်ချုပ်ခွင့်ရတိုင်း		Self-Administered Zone ကိုယ်ပိုင်အုပ်ချုပ်ခွင့်ရဒေသ
District ခရိုင်	District ခရိုင်				Self-Administered Zone ကိုယ်ပိုင်အုပ်ချုပ်ခွင့်ရဒေသ
Third level
Township မြို့နယ်			Township မြို့နယ်		
Township မြို့နယ်			Town မြို့		Subtownship မြို့နယ်ခွဲ
Local level
Ward ရပ်ကွက်				Village Tract ကျေးရွာအုပ်စု	
Ward ရပ်ကွက်				Village ကျေးရွာ	

The regions were called divisions prior to August 2010, and four of them are named after their capital city, the exceptions being Sagaing Region, Ayeyarwady Region and Tanintharyi Region. The regions can be described as ethnically predominantly Burman (Bamar), while the states are dominated by ethnic minorities.

Regions and states are made up of districts, as well as self-administered zones and self-administered divisions if they exist. The self-administered divisions are also constituted by districts. The districts and the self-administered zones consist of townships that include towns, wards and village tracts. Village tracts are groups of adjacent villages.

Yangon Region has the largest population and is the most densely populated. The smallest population is Kayah State. In terms of land area, Shan State is the largest and Naypyidaw Union Territory is the smallest.

The self-administered division (SAD) exists at an administrative level half-a-step below that of states, regions and the union territory, and the self-administrative zones (SAZ) exists at the district level. Nevertheless, the constitution stated that both SAD and SAZs are of equal status. The self-administered areas were formed by statutes on territory controlled by Myanmar's ethnic armed organisations.

Within the hierarchy, the most significant unit of local governance below the first level is the township which form the a consistent set of administrative units across the country. Often, local governance will go directly from the township to the ward. Most of the country do not have separate town offices. For example, in 2015, only 7 of the 27 townships of Ayeyarwady Region had a town office at all.

According to the constitution, townships are made up of wards, towns and village tracts. Village tracts are made up of villages and towns include wards. In some areas, wards directly constitute townships without a town and the constitution also acknowledge them.

Additionally, some townships are divided into Subtownships (မြို့နယ်ခွဲ), which are semi-official parts of a township administered separately, often revolving around a town separate from the township's principal town. Many reports will use subtownships, especially more established subtownships used by the main townships themselves.

The extraconstitutional cities of Yangon, Mandalay and Nay Pyi Taw are defined by development laws. The power to determine and expand the boundaries of each city lies in its city development committee. The territory of each city contains multiple districts. In the cities of Yangon and Mandalay, township development committees acts as subordinates of the city development committee, without a committee for the district level. From 2013 to 2018, there were district development committees between Yangon City Development Committee and township development committees.

== System of administration ==
States of Myanmar Regions of Myanmar Union Territory of Myanmar

The administrative structure of the states, regions and self-administering bodies is outlined in the new constitution adopted in 2008.

=== Regions, States and Union Territories ===
Flag	Name	Burmese	Capital	ISO	Region	Pop. (2024)	Area (km^{2})	Density (per km^{2})
	Ayeyarwady Region	ဧရာဝတီတိုင်းဒေသကြီး	Pathein	MM-07	Lower	5,546,415	35,031.9	158.3
	Bago Region	ပဲခူးတိုင်းဒေသကြီး	Bago	MM-02	Lower	4,453,687	39,404.5	113.02
	Chin State	ချင်းပြည်နယ်	Hakha	MM-14	Upper	373,023	36,018.9	10.4
	Kachin State	ကချင်ပြည်နယ်	Myitkyina	MM-11	Upper	2,153,483	89,041.9	24.2
	Kayah State	ကယားပြည်နယ်	Loikaw	MM-12	Upper	296,901	11,731.5	25.3
	Kayin State	ကရင်ပြည်နယ်	Hpa-an	MM-13	Lower	1,502,774	30,382.8	49.5
	Magway Region	မကွေးတိုင်းဒေသကြီး	Magwe	MM-03	Upper	4,077,653	44,820.6	91.0
	Mandalay Region	မန္တလေးတိုင်းဒေသကြီး	Mandalay	MM-04	Upper	6,323,554	30,888.1	204.7
	Mon State	မွန်ပြည်နယ်	Mawlamyine	MM-15	Lower	2,054,393	12,296.6	149.0
	Nay Pyi Taw Union Territory	နေပြည်တော် ပြည်ထောင်စုနယ်မြေ	Nay Pyi Taw	MM-18	Upper	1,129,322	7,057.1	160.0
	Rakhine State	ရခိုင်ပြည်နယ်	Sittwe	MM-16	Lower	2,526,792	36,778.1	68.7
	Sagaing Region	စစ်ကိုင်းတိုင်းဒေသကြီး	Monywa	MM-01	Upper	5,977,292	93,702.5	63.8
	Shan State	ရှမ်းပြည်နယ်	Taunggyi	MM-17	Upper	6,412,501	155,801.5	41.2
	Tanintharyi Region	တနင်္သာရီတိုင်းဒေသကြီး	Dawei	MM-05	Lower	1,399,965	43,344.9	32.3
	Yangon Region	ရန်ကုန်တိုင်းဒေသကြီး	Yangon	MM-06	Lower	7,369,989	10,276.7	717.2

The 2008 Constitution renamed "divisions" into "regions", and the actual change took place in 2010. Executive authority is held in each state or region by a Regional or State Government consisting of a Chief Minister, other ministers and an Advocate General. The President appoints the Chief Minister from a list of qualified candidates in the regional or state legislature; the legislature must approve this choice unless it is proven that the candidate does not meet constitutional qualifications. Since 4 March 2026, the Region or State minister responsible for development affairs is appointed as the mayor for the capital of the respective Region or State.

Legislative authority resides with the State Hluttaw or Region Hluttaw made up of elected civilian members and representatives of the Defence Services (Tatmadaw military). Both divisions are considered equivalent, the only distinction being that states have large ethnic minority populations and regions are mostly populated by the national majority Burmans / Bamar.

==== Nay Pyi Taw Union Territory ====
The constitution states that Nay Pyi Taw shall be a Union Territory under the direct administration of the President. Day-to-day functions would be carried out on the President's behalf by the Nay Pyi Taw Council led by a Chairperson. The Chairperson and members of the Nay Pyi Taw Council are appointed by the President, and membership includes civilians and representatives of the Defence Services (Tatmadaw military).

=== Sub-States and Sub-Divisions ===
In 1994, Sagaing Division and Bago Division were subdivided into "sub-divisions", and Shan State was subdivided into "sub-states". Even though the constitution does not mention them, these structures continue to exist with sublevel administration and the term "sub-division" is retained.

Sub-States
No.	English name	Burmese name	Capital	Districts	Townships	Population
Within Shan State:
1.	Shan State (North)	ရှမ်းပြည်နယ် (မြောက်ပိုင်း)	Lashio			
2.	Shan State (East)	ရှမ်းပြည်နယ် (အရှေ့ပိုင်း)	Kengtung			
3.	Shan State (South)	ရှမ်းပြည်နယ် (တောင်ပိုင်း)	Taunggyi			

Sub-Divisions
No.	English name	Burmese name	Capital	Districts	Townships	Population
Within Bago Region:
1.	Bago Region (East)	ပဲခူးတိုင်းဒေသကြီး (အရှေ့ပိုင်း)	Taungoo			
2.	Bago Region (West)	ပဲခူးတိုင်းဒေသကြီး (အနောက်ပိုင်း)	Pyay			
Within Sagaing Region:
1.	Sagaing Region (Upper)	စစ်ကိုင်းတိုင်းဒေသကြီး (အထက်ပိုင်း)				
2.	Sagaing Region (Lower)	စစ်ကိုင်းတိုင်းဒေသကြီး (အောက်ပိုင်း)				

=== Self-Administered Division and Self-Administered Zones ===
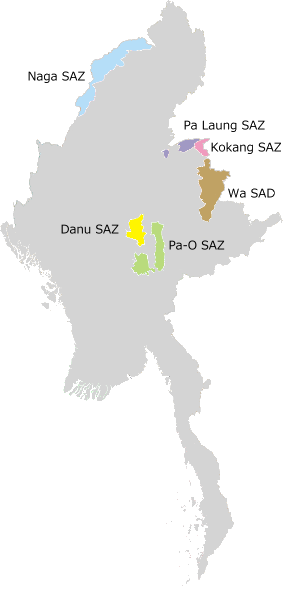
Self-Administered Areas

Self-Administered Areas are subdivisions of some of the states and regions, below the sub-state or sub-division level. Although the self-administered division is above the district level while self-administered zones seem to be equivalent to the administrative level of districts, the constitution stated that both SAD and SAZs are of equal status as SAAs. Each of them is administered by a Leading Body consisting of at least ten members and includes State or Regional Hluttaw members elected from the Zones or Divisions and other members nominated by the Defence Services (Tatmadaw military). The Leading Body has both executive and legislative powers. A Chairperson is head of each Leading Body.

Self-Administered Division
No.	Flag	English name	Burmese name	Capital	Districts	Townships	Population
Within Shan State:
1.		Wa Self-Administered Division	ဝကိုယ်ပိုင်အုပ်ချုပ်ခွင့်ရတိုင်း	Hopang (de facto: 2010–2024) (de jure: 2010–2025); Metman (de facto: 2024–present) (de jure: 2025–present)	Hopang	Hopang, Mongmao, Panwai,	558,000
1.		Wa Self-Administered Division	ဝကိုယ်ပိုင်အုပ်ချုပ်ခွင့်ရတိုင်း	Hopang (de facto: 2010–2024) (de jure: 2010–2025); Metman (de facto: 2024–present) (de jure: 2025–present)	Metman	Nahpan, Metman, Pangsang (Pankham)	558,000

Self-Administered Zones
No.	Flag	English name	Burmese name	Capital	Townships	Population
Within Sagaing Region:
1.		Naga Self-Administered Zone	နာဂကိုယ်ပိုင်အုပ်ချုပ်ခွင့်ရဒေသ	Lahe	Leshi, Lehe, Namyun	116,828
Within Shan State:
2.		Danu Self-Administered Zone	ဓနုကိုယ်ပိုင်အုပ်ချုပ်ခွင့်ရဒေသ	Pindaya	Ywangan, Pindaya	161,835
3.		Kokang Self-Administered Zone	ကိုးကန့်ကိုယ်ပိုင်အုပ်ချုပ်ခွင့်ရဒေသ	Laukkai	Konkyan, Laukkai	123,733
4.		Pa Laung Self-Administered Zone	ပလောင်ကိုယ်ပိုင်အုပ်ချုပ်ခွင့်ရဒေသ	Namhsan	Namhsan, Manton	110,805
5.		Pa'O Self-Administered Zone	ပအိုဝ်းကိုယ်ပိုင်အုပ်ချုပ်ခွင့်ရဒေသ	Hopong	Hopong, Hshihseng, Pinlaung	380,427

=== Special Regions ===
Special Regions refer to areas not under the direct control of the central government but co-administered by some (not all) of the ethnic armed organisations under ceasefire agreements.These special regions are not demarcated, but often referred to by the central government as "integral" to the union. The status of Special Region was first given to the splinter groups emerged from the collapse of the Communist Party of Burma in 1989 and later given also to some other groups through the 1990s under the SLORC/SPDC military government. The Special Regions overlap geographically and administratively with the Self-administered Zones and Divisions.

- Kachin State
  - Kachin State Special Region 1 (New Democratic Army – Kachin, 1989-2024) covering Chipwi District
  - Kachin State Special Region 2 (Kachin Independence Organisation, 1994-2011)
- Shan State
  - Shan State Special Region 1 (Kokang, 1989–present, overlaps with Kokang SAZ)
  - Shan State Special Region 2 (Wa State, 1989–present, overlaps with Wa SAD)
  - Shan State Special Region 3 (Shan State Progress Party, 1989–present)
  - Shan State Special Region 4 (National Democratic Alliance Army, 1989–present)
  - Shan State Special Region 5 (Kachin Defense Army, 1991 - 2023)
  - Shan State Special Region 6 (Pa-O National Organisation, 1991–present, overlaps with Pa'O SAZ)
  - Shan State Special Region 7 (Palaung State Liberation Army), 1991 - 2009, overlaps with Palaung SAZ
- Kayah State
  - Kayah State Special Region 1 (Kayan National Guard, 1992–present)
  - Kayah State Special Region 2 (Karenni National People's Liberation Front, 1994–2023)
  - Kayah State Special Region 3 (Kayan New Land Party, 1994–present)

The special regions in Shan State are often further distinguished by cardinal direction, such as Eastern Shan State Special Region 4 or Wa Special Region 2.

=== Districts and Townships ===
Districts of Myanmar as of 2022

Districts are generally the second-order divisions of Myanmar and are often named after a population center within the district of the same name. Shan State has the highest numbers of normal districts; it also has plus Self-Administered Zones and the districts under the Self-Administered Division. Nay Pyi Taw Union Territory, Tanintharyi and Mon State have the least with just 4 districts. The District's role is more supervisory as the 330 townships are the basic administrative unit of local governance and are the only type of administrative division that covers the entirety of Myanmar. Historically, districts were abolished in 1972 and reestablished in 1992; townships were directly under states and divisions in 1972–1988 and township zones acted as districts in 1988–1992. A District is led by a District Administrator and a Township is administered by a Township Administrator. Both are appointed civil servants through the General Administration Department (GAD) of the Ministry of Home Affairs (MOHA). The Minister of Home Affairs is to be appointed by the military according to the 2008 constitution. The 2008 Constitution of Myanmar defined 75 districts. In April 2022, 46 additional districts were formed by MOHA bringing the total up to 121 districts.

Most local governance services are offered at the Township level; few services are offered at the District level. The Township Administrator is the key focal point for most interactions with the government and the Township Administrator serves as a representative of the State or Region government and executes functions on behalf of the State or Region. All Township governments are staffed by 34 GAD civil servants regardless of population, although larger townships may have several Township committees that coordinate with the Township and report to the District. Townships historically were the second-order subdivisions during the period between the abolishment of districts and subdistricts in 1972 and the establishment of township zones in 1988.

In some cases, the rural portions of the township centred on a different town may be administered semi-independently as sub-townships. Subtownships exist for many but not all townships. They can be created for many reasons including, townships with large areas, townships with a large natural barrier or townships with a lopsided population distribution. These subtownships are not mentioned in the 2008 Constitution but has officially been existing in the General Administration Department's structure since 2011. Subtownships are useful to the Township administration and national ministries for data collection and administrative ease.

=== Cities and Development Committees ===
The definition of a city or a town is ambiguous with the Burmese term မြို့ ("myo") being translated as any urban area. The term မြို့တော် ("myodaw"; royal myo) is used for a city to distinguish from a mere town. The General Administration Department explicitly defines only the three cities of Yangon, Mandalay and Nay Pyi Taw. Municipal governance is the key exception to the general administrative structure of Myanmar with township development committees raising their own revenue and conducting their own services and economic initiatives. Still, the legislative and executive power is held by the State or Region over these development committees.

According to the development law of Yangon Region and development organizations laws of other states and regions, the municipality is functionally administered by the development committees at state/region level and by development organizations at township level, town level and countryside level, apart from the boundaries of the cities of Yangon and Mandalay which are exempted. In the City of Yangon and the City of Mandalay, township development committees act as subordinates of the city development committee according to the development laws of each city.

In Yangon, the administrative jurisdiction of the Yangon City Development Committee overlap across 34 townships. The boundaries of the City of Yangon was defined by law in 1922 but allowed to expand. The development laws handed the Yangon City Development Committee the authority to determine and expand the city's boundaries. By the development laws, the relationship is between township development committees and the city development committee. The city of Yangon overlapped with all four pre-2022 districts of Yangon.

The city of Mandalay is slightly more defined than Yangon. While acknowledging the existing boundaries, its development law handed its city development committee the authority to declare and change the city's boundaries, in a similar way as in Yangon. Prior to the expansion of districts in 2022, the city of Mandalay was functionally administered at the Mandalay District level with townships acting as subdivisions of a city.

=== Towns / Village Tracts and Wards / Villages ===
Other settlements colloquially called "cities" are considered towns in Myanmar. All towns are contained within one township like Pathein.

The lowest level of practical administration is the ward for urban areas and village for rural areas. Villages are grouped into and administered as village tracts. Village Tracts may contain up to 8 distinct villages.

Townships are made up of towns and village tracts as well as wards. If the township is entirely urban, it is directly made of wards and there is no town. Some townships include areas not part of any ward or village tract. Most townships contain at least one town or ward, and are usually named after the population center. As of reforms in 2012 and 2013, Ward and Village Tract administrators are now typically elected, but report to the appointed Township Administrator. Ward Administrators and Village Tract Administrators (also called just Village Administrators) are supported by 100-household-heads and 10-household-heads who are collectively called area leaders.

== History ==
=== British colonisation ===
In 1900, Burma was a province of British India, and was divided into two subdivisions: Lower Burma, whose capital was Rangoon with four divisions (Arakan, Irrawaddy, Pegu, Tenasserim), and Upper Burma, whose capital was Mandalay with six divisions (Meiktila, Minbu, Sagaing, North Federated Shan States and South Federated Shan States).

On 10 October 1922, the Karenni States of Bawlake, Kantarawaddy, and Kyebogyi became a part of the Federated Shan States. In 1940, Minbu division's name was changed to Magwe, and Meiktila Divisions became part of Mandalay District.

=== Post-independence ===
Upon independence, on 4 January 1948, the Chin Hills area was split from Arakan Division to form Chin Special Division, and Kachin State was formed by carving out the Myitkyina and Bhamo districts of Mandalay Division. Kaw-thu-lay Special Region, which was intended to evolve into Karen State, was also created from Amherst, Thaton, and Toungoo Districts of Tenasserim Division. Mongpai State of the Federated Shan States was separated to form Karenni State, and Shan State was formed by merging the other Federated Shan States and the Wa States.

In 1952, Karenni State was renamed as Kayah State. Preparing since 1951, Karen State was officially founded in 1954.

In 1964, Karen State was renamed as Kawthoolei.

In 1972, the Hanthawaddy and Hmawbi districts were separated from Bago Division and they formed Rangoon Division. Tenasserim Division was divided into two separate divisions: Moulmein District and Thaton District came under the Tenasserim Division (1) with Moulmein as the capital, and Myeik District and Tavoy District constituted the Tenasserim Division (2) with Tavoy becoming its capital. In the same year, districts, subdistricts and subtownships were abolished.

The present-day structure of seven states and seven divisions was adopted after the coming into force of the 1974 Constitution. Chin Special Division became Chin State, and its capital moved from Falam to Hakha. The name of Kawthoolei was reverted to Karen State. Tenasserim Division (1) gained statehood as Mon State, whereas Tenasserim Division (2) became the only Tenasserim Division. In addition, Arakan Division was granted statehood as Arakan State.

After the coup d'état by the State Law and Order Restoration Council military junta in 1988, the new level of township zones was introduced between the level of state and divisions and the township level. In 1989, the names of many divisions in Burma were altered in English to reflect Burmese pronunciations. The township zones were redefined as districts in 1992. In 1994, a new level of sub-states and sub-divisions were introduced between the level of states and divisions and the district level.

From 1989 onward, the military government granted the status of special regions to the territories controlled by some (not all) of the ethnic armed groups which entered into cease-fire agreement with the government. After 1995, in Kachin State Mohnyin District was created out of Myitkyina District as part of the peace agreement with the Kachin Independence Army.

=== 2008 Constitution ===
The 2008 Constitution stipulates the renaming of the 7 "divisions" (တိုင်း in Burmese) as "regions" (တိုင်းဒေသကြီး in Burmese). It also stipulates the creation of Union territory which includes the capital Nay Pyi Taw with the same level as the states and regions, and the ethnic self-administered zones (ကိုယ်ပိုင်အုပ်ချုပ်ခွင့်ရဒေသ in Burmese) and self-administered divisions (ကိုယ်ပိုင်အုပ်ချုပ်ခွင့်ရတိုင်း in Burmese) which are the subdivisions of states and regions. These self-administered regions include the following:

- Danu Self-Administered Zone: consisting of Ywangan and Pindaya townships in Shan State
- Kokang Self-Administered Zone: consisting of Konkyan and Laukkai townships in Shan State
- Naga Self-Administered Zone: consisting of Leshi, Lahe, and Namyun townships in Sagaing Region
- Pa Laung Self-Administered Zone: consisting of Namhsan and Manton townships in Shan State
- Pa-O Self-Administered Zone: consisting of Hopong, Hsihseng, and Pinlaung townships in Shan State
- Wa Self-Administered Division: consisting of Hopang, Mongmao, Panwai, Nahpan, Metman, and Pangsang (Pankham) townships in Shan State

On 20 August 2010, the renaming of the 7 divisions and the naming of the 6 self-administered zones was announced by Burmese state media.

== Evolution and changes in hierarchy ==
Changes

=== Historical evolution of states/regions ===
Below is a summary of how Myanmar's first-level administrative divisions have evolved since independence:

1948–1952	1952–1954	1954–1964	1964–1972	1972–1974	1974–1989	1989–2010	2010–present
Kachin State	Kachin State	Kachin State	Kachin State	Kachin State	Kachin State	Kachin State	Kachin State
Shan State	Shan State	Shan State	Shan State	Shan State	Shan State	Shan State	Shan State
Karenni State	Kayah State	Kayah State	Kayah State	Kayah State	Kayah State	Kayah State	Kayah State
Arakan Division	Arakan Division	Arakan Division	Arakan Division	Arakan Division	Arakan State	Rakhine State	Rakhine State
Chin Special Division	Chin Special Division	Chin Special Division	Chin Special Division	Chin Special Division	Chin State	Chin State	Chin State
Kaw-thu-lay Special Region	Kaw-thu-lay Special Region	Karen State	Kawthoolei State	Kawthoolei State	Karen State	Kayin State	Kayin State
Tenasserim Division	Tenasserim Division	Tenasserim Division	Tenasserim Division	Tenasserim Division (1)	Mon State	Mon State	Mon State
Tenasserim Division	Tenasserim Division	Tenasserim Division	Tenasserim Division	Tenasserim Division (2)	Tenasserim Division	Tanintharyi Division	Tanintharyi Region
Pegu Division	Pegu Division	Pegu Division	Pegu Division	Pegu Division	Pegu Division	Bago Division	Bago Region
Pegu Division	Pegu Division	Pegu Division	Pegu Division	Rangoon Division	Rangoon Division	Yangon Division	Yangon Region
Irrawaddy Division	Irrawaddy Division	Irrawaddy Division	Irrawaddy Division	Irrawaddy Division	Irrawaddy Division	Ayeyarwady Division	Ayeyarwady Region
Magwe Division	Magwe Division	Magwe Division	Magwe Division	Magwe Division	Magwe Division	Magway Division	Magway Region
Sagaing Division	Sagaing Division	Sagaing Division	Sagaing Division	Sagaing Division	Sagaing Division	Sagaing Division	Sagaing Region
Mandalay Division	Mandalay Division	Mandalay Division	Mandalay Division	Mandalay Division	Mandalay Division	Mandalay Division	Mandalay Region
Mandalay Division	Mandalay Division	Mandalay Division	Mandalay Division	Mandalay Division	Mandalay Division	Mandalay Division	Nay Pyi Taw Union Territory

=== Historical changes in hierarchy ===
1948–1954				1954–1972			1972–1974			1974–1988			1988–1989		1989–1992			1992–1994			1994–2010				2010–present				
The Union				The Union			The Union			The State			The State		The State			The State			The State				The Republic				
First level				First level			First level			First level			First level		First level			First level			First level				First level				
State	Special Region	Special Division	Division	State	Special Division	Division	State	Special Division	Division	State	Division		State	Division	State		Division	State		Division	State	Division	State	Division	Union Territory	State	Region	State	Region
State	Special Region	Special Division	Division	State	Special Division	Division	State	Special Division	Division	State	Division		State	Division	State		Division	State		Division	State	Division	Sub-State	Sub-Division	Union Territory	State	Region	Sub-State	Sub-Division
Second level				Second level			Second level			Second level			Second level		Second level			Second level			Second level				Second level				
City		District		City		District	City	Township	Township	City	Township	Township	City	Township Zone	Special Region	City	Township Zone	Special Region	City	District	Special Region	City	District		District	City	Special Region	Self-Administered Division	Self-Administered Zone
District		District		District		District	City	Township	Township	City	Township	Township	City	Township Zone	Special Region	City	Township Zone	Special Region	City	District	Special Region	City	District		District	City	Special Region	Self-Administered Division	Self-Administered Zone
Subdistrict				Subdistrict			City	Township	Township	City	Township	Township	Township Zone	Township Zone	Township Zone		Township Zone	District		District	District		District		District	District			Self-Administered Zone
Third level				Third level			Township	Township	Township	Township	Township	Township	Third level		Third level			Third level			Third level				Third level				
Township		Township		Township	Township		Township	Township	Township	Township	Township	Township	Township	Township	Township	Township		Township	Township		Township		Township		Township			Township	
Township		Town	Subtownship	Township	Town	Subtownship	Township	Town	Township	Township	Town	Township	Town	Township	Town	Township		Town	Township		Town		Township		Township			Town	Subtownship
Local level				Local level						Local level			Local level		Local level			Local level			Local level				Local level				
Ward		Village Tract		Ward	Village Tract		Ward		Village Tract	Ward		Village Tract	Ward	Village Tract	Ward		Village Tract	Ward		Village Tract	Ward			Village Tract	Ward			Village Tract	
Ward		Village		Ward	Village		Ward		Village	Ward		Village	Ward	Village	Ward		Village	Ward		Village	Ward			Village	Ward			Village	

== See also ==
- List of administrative divisions of Myanmar by Human Development Index
- Districts of Myanmar
- List of cities and largest towns in Myanmar
- State and Region Government of Myanmar
- List of Burmese flags
- ISO 3166-2:MM
