= Peng family =

Political family in Kokang

Peng family Peng clan
- Country: People's Government of Kokang
- Origin: Sichuan Province, Great Qing
- Founded: Unknown
- Founder: Father or mother of Peng Huiwen (name not known)
- Titles: List: Political titles: Chairperson of Kokang Special Region 1 Administrative Committee Chairman of the Special Region 1 of the Union of Myanmar Commander-in-Chief of the Myanmar National Democratic Alliance Army Deputy Commander-in-Chief of the Myanmar National Democratic Alliance Army General Secretary of the Myanmar National Truth and Justice Party First Lady of Eastern Shan State Special Region 4 Honorific titles: Daw
- Members: List: Father of Peng Huiwen (name not known) Mother of Peng Huiwen (name not known) Peng Huiwen Peng Jichang Peng Jiasheng (Pheung Kya-shin) Li Xiaoshuang Peng Daxun (Peng Deren) Peng Dali (Peng Deli) Peng Deyi Peng Delu Peng Xinchun (Nang Yin) Peng Jiafu (Pheung Kya-fu/Phong Kyaw Phu) Peng Jiagui Peng Jiarong Peng Jiahua Peng Jiazhen Peng Ta Li Peng Xiaoyi Peng Ta Phu Peng Jiaxin Possible members: Peng Deqi
- Connected members: List: Sai Leun (Lin Mingxian) Htein Lin (Lin Daode) Zhang Hongying Li Guoquan (Hla Win) Yang Mao-liang Yang Mao-xiu Yang Mao-xian Yang Mao-an Yang Keqiang Yang Kexun
- Connected families: List: Yang Clan Family of Sai Leun

The Peng family or Peng clan is a political family in Kokang. It is one of the most prominent families in Kokang, besides the Bai family, Yang family (Yang clan), Liu family, Wei family and the Ming family.

== History ==
The father or mother of Peng Huiwen is the first member of the Peng family, his/her son Peng Huiwen was the father of Peng Jichang. Between the 1900s and the early 1910s, the Peng family moved from the Sichuan Province of Great Qing to Kokang which was then part of Burma a province of India, which was a colony of the United Kingdom of Great Britain and Ireland. One member of the Peng family married into the Yang clan, the ruling family of the Chiefdom of Kokang. On 5 February 1931 or on the 26 January 1932 Peng Jichang's first son, Peng Jiasheng, also called Pheung Kya-shin, who would later become the leader of a rebel group, was born near the Haungsawhtuuhaw Village and the Hongshitou River. Peng Jiasheng had six siblings, of whom one died early and five others whose names are known (Peng Jiafu, Peng Ta Phu, Peng Jiagui, Peng Jiahua and Peng Jiazhen). Peng Jiasheng married Li Xiaoshuang and had five children (Peng Daxun, Peng Dali, Peng Deyi, Peng Delu and Peng Xinchun). Peng Xinchun married Sai Leun, who already had a son Htein Lin, with his first wife Zhang Hongying. Peng Daxun who was born on 16 July 1957 or in 1965 followed in the footsteps of his father and became leader of the rebel group Myanmar National Democratic Alliance Army in 2009, succeeding his uncle Peng Jiafu. Peng Daxun's brother-in-law, Chinese-Burmese businessman Li Guoquan (also known as Hla Win), died in Tatmadaw custody in 2015.

== Political activities ==
Peng Jiasheng and Peng Jiafu were the first members of the family that became political active, after the Tatmadaw invaded Kokang in 1965, later this year Peng Jiasheng founded the Kokang People's Revolutionary Army, a small group of youth which ingaged in guerilla warfare against the Tatmadaw. The KPRA later got replaced with the Kokang People's Liberation Army, whoms leader was still Peng Jiasheng, in 1968 Peng Jiasheng joined the Communist Party of Burma and established the Kokang Province of it. In 1989 the CPB split and Peng Jiasheng established the Myanmar National Democratic Alliance Army on 11 March 1989 and became its Commander-in-Chief. Peng Jiafu followed his brother in his struggle against the government of Myanmar, Peng Jiafu became the Deputy Commander-in-Chief of the MNDAA. The other siblings of Peng Jiasheng and Peng Jiafu also got high-ranking positions in the MNDAA, but also the children of Peng Jiasheng, the most famous one Peng Daxun. After an ceasefire with the government, the MNDAA got their own autonomous area called Special Region 1 of the Union of Myanmar, which was established on the 3 January 1990 and with Peng Jiasheng becoming the Chairman, a position he held from 1990 until 1993 and again from 1995 until 2009. (Note: From 2009 until 2022 in exile.) During the 2009 Kokang incident, Peng Jiasheng was removed from office by the Tatmadaw, afterwards Peng Jiasheng fled. In March 2011 the MNDAA established the People's Government of Kokang a rival government in Kokang led by Peng Jiasheng, which opposes the central government. On 16 February 2022, Peng Jiasheng died and was succeeded by his son Peng Daxun the founder and general secretary of the Myanmar National Truth and Justice Party, who reestablished the Special Region 1 in January 2024, however the restored Special Region 1 is not recognized by the Myanmar government. In the case of Peng Jiasheng's daughter Peng Xinchun, she became the First Lady of the Eastern Shan State Special Region 4 after she married Sai Leun.

== See also ==
- Bo family
- Chiang family
- Family of Deng Xiaoping
- Family of Mao Zedong
- Hotung family
- Saloth family
- Kim family
- Xi family
- Zeng family
