= Saloth family =

Family of Pol Pot

Saloth family Loth family Family of Pol Pot Pol Pot's family
- Pol Pot, the Supreme Leader of Democratic Kampuchea in May 1978
- Country: Kingdom of Cambodia List: Historical: ?–1940: French Republic; Indochinese Union; Kingdom of Cambodia 1940–1941: French State; Indochinese Union; Kingdom of Cambodia 1941–1945: Condominium between French State and Empire of Japan; Indochinese Union; Kingdom of Cambodia 1945: Empire of Japan; Kingdom of Cambodia 1945: Kingdom of Kampuchea 1945–1946: French Republic; Indochinese Union; Kingdom of Cambodia 1946–1953: French Republic; Indochinese Union; Kingdom of Cambodia 1953–1970: Kingdom of Cambodia/State of Cambodia 1970–1975: Khmer Republic 1972–1975, 1993–1994: Liberated Zones 1975–1993: Kampuchea/Democratic Kampuchea 1979–1992; People's Republic of Kampuchea/State of Cambodia 1992–1993: Cambodia 1994–1998: Provisional Government of National Union and National Salvation of Cambodia
- Current region: Southeast Asia
- Founded: Unknown
- Founder: Phem
- Titles: List: State positions: Supreme Leader of Democratic Kampuchea Prime Minister of Democratic Kampuchea Deputy Prime Minister of Democratic Kampuchea Commander-in-Chief of the Kampuchea Revolutionary Army De facto leader of the Provisional Government of National Union and National Salvation of Cambodia Spouse of the Prime Minister of Democratic Kampuchea Minister of Foreign Affairs of Democratic Kampuchea Secretary in the Ministry of Foreign Affairs Minister of Social Affairs of Democratic Kampuchea President of the Democratic Kampuchea Women's Association Party positions: General Secretary of the Communist Party of Kampuchea Party Secretary for Kampong Thom province of the Communist Party of Kampuchea General Secretary of the Party of Democratic Kampuchea Leader of the Democratic National Union Movement
- Members: List: Phem Cheng Saloth Phem/Loth Sok Nem/Duk Nem Saloth Sar/Pol Pot/Tol Sat Khieu Ponnary Mea Son Sar Patchata/Mea Sith Sy Vicheka Bun Chanthou Mea Son Saloth Chhay Saloth Roeung Unnamed grandchildren of Saloth Roeung Saloth Nhep Nhep Thol Saloth Suong Unnamed grandchildren of Saloth Roeung Unnamed first wife of Saloth Soung Chea Samy Unnamed child of Saloth Soung Saloth Seng Three other siblings of Pol Pot Saloth Meak Saloth Ban Srey Poline Dul Tin Ieng Thirith Ieng Sary/Kim Trang
- Connected members: List: Prince Sisowath Kusarak Tep Khunnal Kim Riem Tran Thi Loi Parents of Tran Thi Loi Khieu Samphan So Socheat Unnamed brother-in-law of Saloth Ban
- Connected families: List: House of Sisowath
- Traditions: Buddhism

The Saloth family or Loth family is the family of Pol Pot, who ruled over Democratic Kampuchea, the Cambodian state from 1975 until 1979, due to this the family is sometimes called Family of Pol Pot or Pol Pot's family.

== History ==
=== Early family history ===
The founding member of the Saloth family was Phem; his son, Loth, then took the name Saloth Phem. Saloth Phem married Sok Nem, also known as Duk Nem, with whom he had nine children. One of their children was Saloth Sar, who would be later known as Pol Pot. Three of Pol Pot's siblings died in their early years. While Saloth Chhay, Saloth Roeung, Saloth Nhep, Saloth Suong and Saloth Seng, who are his other siblings, survived the early years. When Pol Pot was six years old, he and an older brother (probably Saloth Chhay) were sent to live with their cousin Saloth Meak in Phnom Penh. Years later, in the summer of 1935, Pol Pot went to live with his brother Suong and the latter's wife and child. In 1943, when Pol Pot was 18 years old, he received his Certificat d'Etudes Primaires Complémentaires. Pol Pot tried to enroll in the Lycée Sisowath, but he didn't pass the exam in summer 1948. After failing the exam, Pol Pot enrolled at the École Technique. In his time at the École Technique, he met Ieng Sary, who studied at the Lycée Sisowath; Ieng would later become his brother-in-law. Pol Pot and Ieng Sary also met during that time Khieu Ponnary and her sister Ieng Thirith. In 1949 Pol Pot and other 21 selected students enrolled at École française de radioélectricité, Ieng Sary also studied in Paris. During their time in Paris, both Pol Pot and Ieng Sary came into contact with Marxism. When Pol Pot returned to the Kingdom of Cambodia in January 1953, he became politically active. Pol Pot spent several months at the headquarters of Prince Norodom Chantaraingsey—the leader of one faction—in Trapeng Kroloeung. Saloth Chhay initially encouraged his younger brother Saloth Sar, in 1953, to work with Chantaraingsey, but Pol Pot rejected the prince as "feudal". Pol Pot was however able to use Chhay's connections within the communist anti-colonial movement to gain contacts; Chhay spent time with the Viet Minh, who had a presence in the Cambodian border areas, taking his brother with him. His visit to the eastern headquarters of the United Issarak Front, the Cambodian communist resistance, paved the way for his brother's visit there in 1953.

=== Political activities of family members between 1953 and 1967 ===
In 1953 Pol Pot moved to Phnom Penh, where he met with Ping Say to discuss the situation of the Kingdom of Cambodia. Years later, Pol Pot rented a house in the Boeng Keng Kang area of Phnom Penh. Pol Pot became a teacher at the Chamraon Vichea, Pol Pot courted society belle Soeung Son Maly before entering a relationship with Khieu Ponnary, they married in a Buddhist ceremony on 14 July 1956. While he still was a teacher, Pol Pot was still politically active, all correspondence between the Democratic Party and the Pracheachon went through him. Saloth Chhay was a member of the Pracheachon and published his own newspaper Sammaki, due to an article that criticised Sihanouk, Saloth Chhay was once jailed in 1955. In 1959 the Kampuchean Labour Party was established. Pol Pot, Tou Samouth and Nuon Chea were part of a four-man General Affair Committee leading the party. The Kampuchean Labour Party's conference, held clandestinely from September to October 1960 in Phnom Penh in which Pol Pot took the third senior position and Ieng Sary the fourth. On 30 September 1960, the Workers Party of Kampuche, was founded as a separate Party. Tou Samouth became its first general secretary and held the position until 1962, Samouth successor was Pol Pot who had from 1961 on had the second senior position of the party, Pol Pot took the office in 1963. Under his leadership, the party was renamed into Communist Party of Kampuchea in 1966. In November 1967, Pol Pot contracted malaria and required a respite in a Viet Cong medical base near Mount Ngork. By December, plans for armed conflict were complete, with the war to begin in the North-West Zone and then spread to other regions. As communication across Cambodia was slow, each Zone would have to operate independently much of the time.

=== Cambodian Civil War (1967–1975) ===
On 17 January 1968, the Khmer Rouge under Pol Pot started their insurgency and participated in the Cambodian Civil War. Saloth Chhay was once again jailed in 1969. Pol Pot set up his residence on the northern side of the Chinit River. The entry was strictly controlled. In early 1972, Pol Pot embarked on his first tour of the Marxist-controlled areas across Cambodia. In these areas, called "liberated zones", corruption was stamped out, gambling was banned, and alcohol and extramarital affairs were discouraged. Further, in May 1972, the Khmer Rouge under Pol Pot began ordering all of those living under its control to dress like poor peasants. One year later in May 1973, Pol Pot ordered the collectivisation of villages in territory that the Khmer Rouge controlled; in response, many villagers fled. On 17 April 1975 Phnom Penh fell to the Khmer Rouge, with it the Khmer Republic disestablished and Democratic Kampuchea was established.

=== Democratic Kampuchea (1975–1979) ===
The new established Democratic Kampuchea ordered Phnom Penh's immediate evacuation. During this evacuation, Saloth Chhay died en route or was killed by the Khmer Rouge. Pol Pot became the Supreme Leader of Democratic Kampuchea in 1975, other offices he held were the office of Commander-in-Chief of the Revolutionary Army of Kampuchea, President of the Kampuchean People's Representative Assembly and the office of Prime Minister, which he held twice, once from 14 April 1976 until 27 September 1976 and again from 25 October 1976 until 7 January 1979. Pol Pot's wife Khieu Ponnary had the position of Spouse of the Prime Minister. Other members of the family were appointed to high positions in the new government, Saloth Ban was appointed as Secretary in the Ministry of Foreign Affairs, Ieng Sary became Deputy Prime Minister and Minister of Foreign Affairs in 1976, his wife, Ieng Thirith whom he married in 1951 became Minister of Social Affairs in October 1975. On 25 December 1978, the Cambodian–Vietnamese War started which ousted Pol Pot from power on 7 January 1979, after Vietnamese troops took over Phnom Penh.

=== After the fall of Phnom Penh to the Vietnamese ===
As response Pol Pot and other senior government figures left the city of Phnom Penh and drove to Pursat, where they spent two days there before moving on to Battambang. After fleeing, Pol Pot divorced Khieu Ponnary in the same year. In December 1979, Pol Pot was replaced as supreme leader and as prime minister of Democratic Kampuchea, which was then a government-in-exile. In 1986 Pol Pot married his second wife Mea Son, with whom he has Sar Patchata, a daughter. By the end of 1996, after years of fighting the Khmer Rouge had lost almost all the territory they held in the interior of Cambodia, being restricted to a few hundred miles along the northern border. Pol Pot's health was declining; he suffered from aortic stenosis and no longer had access to follow-up treatment for his earlier cancer. A stroke left him paralysed on the left side of his body, and he eventually required daily access to oxygen. He spent increasing amounts of time with his family, in particular his daughter. Ieng Sary defected from Pol Pot in 1996 and established the Democratic National Union Movement, a split from the Cambodian National Unity Party. Pol Pot had grown suspicious of Son Sen and in June 1997 ordered his assassination. Khmer Rouge cadres subsequently killed Sen and 13 of his family members and aides. Ta Mok was concerned that Pol Pot could turn on him too. Mok rallied troops loyal to him at Anlong Veng, informing them that Pol Pot had betrayed their movement, and then headed to Kbal Ansoang. Fearing Mok's troops, on 12 June 1997, Pol Pot, his family, and several bodyguards fled on foot. Pol Pot was very frail and had to be carried. After Mok's troops apprehended them, Pol Pot was placed under house arrest. Khieu Samphan and Nuon Chea sided with Mok. During his time of house arrest, Pol Pot was part of an interview by Nate Thayer. In July 1997 Pol Pot was sentenced to life imprisonment. On 15 April 1998, Pol Pot died in his sleep of a heart attack Thayer, who was present, claimed that Pol Pot killed himself when he became aware of Ta Mok's plan to hand him over to the United States, saying that "Pol Pot died after ingesting a lethal dose of a combination of Valium and chloroquine" or that he drunk poison.

During all this, Pol Pot's sister Saloth Roeung and his brothers Saloth Nhep, Saloth Suong and Saloth Seng gave interviews where they talked about Pol Pot and how they remembered them.

=== After the death of Pol Pot ===
After his death, Pol Pot's body was preserved with ice after an improvised embalming with formaldehyde had failed, so that his death could be verified by journalists attending his funeral. Three days later, his wife cremated his body on a pyre of tyres and rubbish, utilising traditional Buddhist funerary rites. Pol Pot's ashes are buried in a small grave in Choam Sa-Ngam, Oddar Meanchey province. The grave is covered by a tin roof and surrounded by a small fence. In May, Pol Pot's widow and Tep Khunnal fled to Malaysia, where they married.

After Pol Pot's death his brother Saloth Nhep, gave an interview in 2006, where he talked about his brother Saloth Sar, four years later in 2010 he died.

In 2007 members of the Saloth family, attended the tribunal of former Khmer Rouge member and visited the killing fields. In the same year, Ieng Sary and Ieng Thirith were both were arrested for war crimes and crimes against humanity. Before their arrest they lived in a villa on Street 21, in southern Phnom Penh.

In 2012, Saloth Ban was put in the tribunal for his role in the government.

In 2013, Ieng Sary died.

In March 2014, the daughter of Pol Pot and Mea Son, Sar Patchata who was 26 at the time married Sy Vicheka.

In 2015, Ieng Thirith died.

== Connected family ==
The Saloth family is related to the House of Sisowath, through Saloth Meak, also known as Khun Meak, a principal wife of Sisowath Monivong, with whom she had a child, Sisowath Kusarak, who was born in 1926.

== Members ==
- Phem, father of Saloth Phem/Loth
- Cheng, sister of Saloth Phem/Loth and mother of Saloth Meak/Khun Meak
- Saloth Phem/Loth, father of Pol Pot
- Sok Nem/Duk Nem, mother of Pol Pot
- Saloth Sar/Pol Pot/Tol Sat (Note: Tol Sat was a fake identity of Pol Pot.)
- Khieu Ponnary, first wife of Pol Pot
- Mea Son, second wife of Pol Pot
- Sar Patchata/Mea Sith, daughter of Mea Son and Pol Pot
- Sy Vicheka, son-in-law of Pol Pot
- Bun Chanthou, granddaughter of Pol Pot
- Saloth Chhay, brother of Pol Pot
- Saloth Roeung/Sareung, sister of Pol Pot
- Unnamed grandchildren of Saloth Roeung
- Saloth Nhep, brother of Pol Pot
- Nhep Thol, daughter of Saloth Nhep
- Saloth Suong/Loth Suong, brother of Pol Pot
- Unnamed first wife of Saloth Soung
- Chea Samy, wife of Saloth Soung
- Unnamed child of Saloth Soung
- Saloth Seng, brother of Pol Pot
- Three other siblings of Pol Pot which died young
- Saloth Meak/Khun Meak, cousin of Pol Pot and Monivong Sisowath's principal wife
- Saloth Ban/So Hong, nephew of Pol Pot
- Srey Poline, niece of Pol Pot
- Dul Tin, nephew-in-law of Pol Pot
- Ieng Thirith, sister of Khieu and sister-in-law of Pol Pot
- Ieng Sary/Kim Trang, brother-in-law of Pol Pot

=== Connected members ===
- Prince Sisowath Kusarak, son of Saloth Meak and Sisowath Monivong
- Tep Khunnal, stepfather of Sar Patchata
- Kim Riem, father of Ieng Sary
- Tran Thi Loi, mother of Ieng Sary
- Parents of Tran Thi Loi
- Khieu Samphan
- So Socheat
- Unnamed brother-in-law of Saloth Ban

== See also ==
- Bo family
- Chiang family
- Family of Deng Xiaoping
- Family of Mao Zedong
- Hotung family
- Peng family
- Kim family
- Xi family
- Zeng family
