= Htein Lin =

Htein Lin may refer to:

- Htein Lin (artist), Burmese painter, performance artist, and activist
- Htein Lin (colonel), Burmese military officer
- Htein Lin (politician), chairman of Eastern Shan State Special Region 4 in Myanmar
