= Uth Roeun =

Cambodian cartoonist (born 1944)

- Born: 1944 (age 81–82)
- Education: Lycée Sisowath
- Occupations: Cartoonist, civil servant

Uth Roeun (born 1944) is a Cambodian cartoonist.

Responsible for the first Cambodian comic book in 1964, he is a key figure in the "golden age" of Cambodian comics prior to the Khmer Rouge regime.

He later served as Department Chief for Publishing at the Cambodian Ministry of Education, Youth and Sport.

== Education and career ==
In 1962, Rouen was attending the Lycée Sisowath, a secondary school located in Phnom Penh, when his art teacher introduced him to French bandes dessinées and he was inspired to draw Khmer-language comics.

Of his first comic book, the story of two teenage friends, he said, "Frankly the illustrations weren't beautiful. I had no idea how to draw properly. When I'd finished illustrating the first one, no printers wanted to take it [...] it was new and nothing like it had ever been produced before.” Eventually, it was published in 1964 as Neytung Neysang, the first Cambodian comic book. The book sold twenty thousand copies and earned him four thousand riel.

Rouen's second book, Preah Thoung Neang Neak (1964), contained content about tolerance towards Muslims, which prompted the police to arrest and interrogate him for a day. He missed an examination and quit school entirely to devote himself to cartooning. He also drew book covers, illustrated magazines and schoolbooks, and painted.

Many comic books were lost during the Khmer Rouge regime. The earliest surviving comic book by Rouen is 1966's One Night for You.

His career came to a halt when he was conscripted during the Khmer Republic. During the Khmer Rouge regime, he drew construction plans for the government. "The government said you are an artist, then you must draw. There was no money paid, just food given. I drew pictures for the Khmer Rouge. If they were building a dam, I did the drawing of it. My fingers were red from exerting myself while drawing for the Pol Pot regime. [...] I served by drawing soldiers, Khmer Rouge plans. I was too skinny to work in the rice fields; I was very thin and could not do hard, physical work."

Comics had a resurgence in the 1980s, with new books being published and surviving books reprinted, though many were pirated without attribution to the artists. These years featured reprints of Roeun's Torn Chey (1985), about a peasant boy who outwits the king; and Tum Teav (1986), an adaptation of the classic Cambodian romance; and his new work New Life in Kompong Preah (1986).

In 2000, Rouen founded The Association of Cambodian Artist Friends, based near Wat Phnom.
