= Mong La District, Eastern Shan State Special Region 4 =

Mong La District

Mong La District (Burmese: မိုင်းလားခရိုင်, Shan: ဢိူင်ႇမိူင်းလႃး, Tai Lü: ᩋᩮᩨ᩠᩵ᨦᨾᩮᩨ᩠ᨦᩃᩣ, Akha: Meqlaq mircoer, Chinese: 勐拉县), formerly known as the Mong La Region (Burmese: မိုင်းလားဒေသ, Shan: ဢိူင်ႇမိူင်းမိူင်းလႃး, Tai Lü: ᩋᩮᩨ᩠᩵ᨦᨾᩮᩨ᩠ᨦᨾᩮᩨ᩠ᨦᩃᩣ, Chinese: 勐拉地区), is a district in Eastern Shan State Special Region 4. It is located at the tri-border area of China and Myanmar.

Mong La District administers 7 duingnais:

- Mong La Duingnai ( မိုင်းလားဒိုင်နယ် 勐拉乡)
- Hta Pang Tain Duingnai ( ထပန်းတိုင်ဒိုင်နယ် 塔邦岱乡)
- Pang Kaw Duingnai ( ပန်ကော်ဒိုင်နယ် 邦果乡)
- Pong Hsan Duingnai ( ပုန်ဆန်ဒိုင်နယ် 蚌煽乡)
- Mong Ma Duingnai ( မိုင်းမဒိုင်နယ် 勐马乡)
- Wan Tan Duingnai ( ဝမ်တန်ဒိုင်နယ် 万丹乡)
- Wan Har Duingnai ( ဝမ်ဟာဒိုင်နယ် 万哈乡)
