= Htein Lin (politician) =

Burmese politician

U Htein Lin
- ထိန်လင်း

President of the Eastern Shan State Special Region 4
- Incumbent
- Assumed office 7 August 2024
- Deputy: San Pae; Khun Hsang Lu
- Preceded by: Sai Leun

Chairman of the Peace and Solidarity Committee
- Incumbent
- Assumed office 7 August 2024
- Preceded by: Sai Leun

Personal details
- Born: Lin Daode (林道德) Mong La, Shan State, Myanmar
- Party: Peace and Solidarity Committee
- Occupation: Military and Political Leader

Military service
- Allegiance: National Democratic Alliance Army
- Rank: Commander-in-chief of the NDAA

Htein Lin (Burmese: ထိန်လင်း; Chinese: 吴腾林; born Lin Daode), is a Burmese ethnic leader currently serving as the President of Eastern Shan State Special Region 4 (commonly known as Mong La) and Commander of the National Democratic Alliance Army (NDAA). He also holds the post of Chairman of the Peace and Solidarity Committee (PSC), the de facto governing body of Special Region 4.

== Career ==
Born as the eldest son of Sai Leun (commonly known as Lin Mingxian) and his first wife, he is fluent in Burmese, Shan, and Mandarin. His multilingual background derives from his Shan-Chinese father and his Burmese-Shan mother.

Htein Lin inherited significant leadership roles after his father's formal retirement due to health reasons. Sai Leun served as the first regional leader since the region's establishment in 1989 and was chairman of the PSC until his death on 7 August 2024. Htein Lin then assumed the roles of President of Special Region 4, PSC Chairman/General Secretary, and NDAA Commander-in-Chief.

The Peace and Solidarity Committee (PSC), originally formed as the Eastern Shan State Military and Political Committee in 1989, was officially reconstituted in 2005. Htein Lin has been its General Secretary since 2007, handling much of the region's political administration even before formally becoming PSC Chairman .

As President of Special Region 4, he governs the Mong La area (covering Mong La, Nam Pan, and Hsee Lu districts) with near-total autonomy, though nominally under Myanmar's federal and Shan State governments.

As Commander-in-Chief of the NDAA, the region's armed force (estimated at 3,000–4,000 personnel), he leads the military successor organization to the Communist Party of Burma's 815th Military Region. The NDAA remains an independent ethnic armed group and is a member of the Federal Political Negotiation and Consultative Committee (FPNCC) alongside other ethnic armies.

Eastern Shan State Special Region 4 operates under a Chinese model, with official use of Mandarin alongside local languages and a controlled economy anchored in cross-border trade, tourism, casinos, and agriculture. The region has long been criticized for illegal wildlife trade and drug trafficking, leading to periodic border closures by China.

Under Htein Lin's leadership, the NDAA and PSC maintain strong ties with China, Laos, and Vietnam, and collaborate closely with other ethnic armed organizations such as the Kokang and Wa state. In particular, Htein Lin's administration reportedly supported the National Democratic Alliance Army in military operations such as the Operation 1027 through logistical aid and even disguised troop participation.
