= Myanmar National Truth and Justice Party =

Kokang area political party

- Burmese name: မြန်မာနိုင်ငံ အမှန်တရားနှင့် တရားမျှတသော အမျိုးသား ပါတီ
- Chinese name: 缅甸民族正义党; Miǎndiàn Mínzú Zhèngyì Dǎng
- Abbreviation: MNTJP
- General Secretary: Peng Daxun
- Spokesperson: Li Jiawen (李家文)
- Deputy General Secretary: Yang Wenzhou (杨文洲)
- Founded: 29 June 2013; 13 years ago
- Headquarters: Laukkai
- Armed wing: Myanmar National Democratic Alliance Army
- Ideology: Kokang nationalism; Ethno-nationalism; Xi Jinping Thought; Chinese economic model
- Political position: Far-left

Party flag
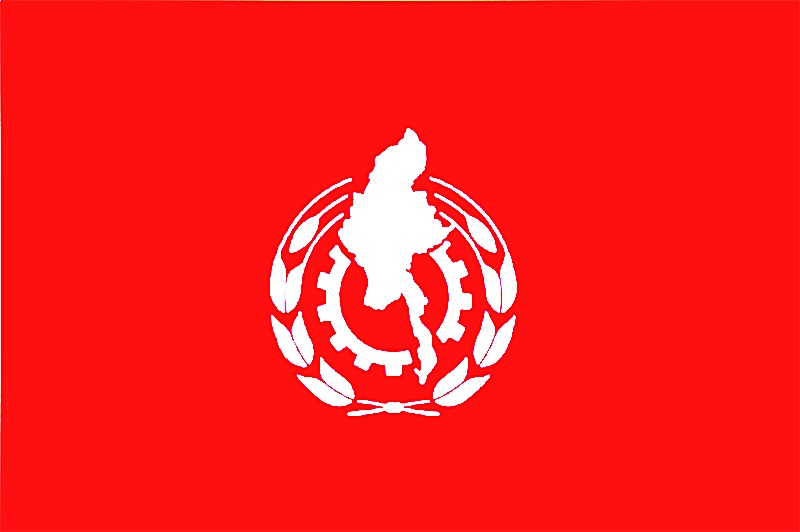

The Myanmar National Truth and Justice Party (MNTJP) or also called Kokang Democracy Party (KDP) is a political party in Myanmar. It is the political wing of the Myanmar National Democratic Alliance Army (MNDAA), an armed resistance group in the Kokang region of Myanmar. The MNTJP cooperates politically and militarily with other members of the Northern Alliance and the Three Brotherhood Alliance. It is also a member of the Federal Political Negotiation and Consultative Committee (FPNCC), which is led by the United Wa State Army (UWSA).

== History ==
According to the Kokang Information Network (Chinese: 果敢资讯网), a media outlet related to the MNDAA, the MNTJP was founded on June 29, 2013. On 5 January 2024, following the capture of Laukkai by MNDAA forces during Operation 1027, the MNTJP reestablished its own administration in the area.
