= Nam Pan District =

Nam Pan District (Burmese: နမ့်ပန်းခရိုင်, Shan: ဢိူင်ႇၼမ်ႉပၢၼ်း, Tai Lü: ᩋᩮᩨ᩠᩵ᨦᨶᩣᩴᩢᨻᩣ᩠ᨶ, Akha: Nabaq mircoer, Chinese: 南板县), formerly known as the Nam Pan Region (Burmese: နမ့်ပန်းဒေသ, Shan: ဢိူင်ႇမိူင်းၼမ်ႉပၢၼ်း, Tai Lü: ᩋᩮᩨ᩠᩵ᨦᨾᩮᩨ᩠ᨦᨶᩣᩴᩢᨻᩣ᩠ᨶ, Chinese: 南板地区), is a district in Eastern Shan State Special Region 4. It is located at the tri-border area of China, Myanmar, and Laos.

Nam Pan District administers 11 duingnais:

- Hpar Kyan Duingnai ( ဖါးကျန့်ဒိုင်နယ် 帕章乡)
- Keng Hkam Duingnai ( ကျိုင်းခမ်းဒိုင်နယ် 景康乡)
- Gyo Way Duingnai ( ဂျိုဝေဒိုင်နယ် 玖伟乡)
- Dee Shee Duingnai ( ဒီရှီးဒိုင်နယ် 迪斯乡)
- Par Sang Duingnai ( ပါဆန်းဒိုင်နယ် 帕沙乡)
- Hpar Loet Duingnai ( ဖါးလုံဒိုင်နယ် 帕罗乡)
- Mong Hkam Duingnai ( မိုင်းခမ်းဒိုင်နယ် 勐康乡)
- Mong Hsaw Duingnai ( မိုင်းဆောဒိုင်နယ် 勐索乡)
- Me Hkawng Duingnai ( မဲခေါင်ဒိုင်နယ် 湄公河乡)
- Wan Hkoe Duingnai ( ဝမ်ခိုးဒိုင်နယ် 万科乡)
- Wein Long Duingnai ( ဝိန်းလုံဒိုင်နယ် 温龙乡)
