= Federal Political Negotiation and Consultative Committee =

Military alliance of opposition groups in Myanmar

- ပြည်ထောင်စုနိုင်ငံရေးဆွေးနွေးညှိနှိုင်းရေးကော်မတီ
- Leader: Bao Youxiang
- Dates active: 19 April 2017 – present
- Groups: Arakan Army; Kachin Independence Army; Myanmar National Democratic Alliance Army; National Democratic Alliance Army; Ta'ang National Liberation Army; Shan State Progress Party; United Wa State Army
- Active regions: Kachin State; Rakhine State; Shan State; China–Myanmar border
- Ideology: Ethnic nationalism Ethnic separatism Federalism
- Wars: the internal conflict in Myanmar

The Federal Political Negotiation and Consultative Committee (Burmese: ပြည်ထောင်စုနိုင်ငံရေးဆွေးနွေးညှိနှိုင်းရေးကော်မတီ, abbreviated FPNCC) is an alliance and coalition of seven ethnic armed organisations (EAOs) in Myanmar seeking to negotiate with the central government. Four FPNCC members – the Arakan Army (AA), the Kachin Independence Army (KIA), the Myanmar National Democratic Alliance Army (MNDAA) and the Ta'ang National Liberation Army (TNLA) – are also members of the Northern Alliance. The FPNCC is the largest negotiating body of EAOs in the country. The Chinese government formally engages with the FPNCC, which is also recognised by the Chinese government as an EAO negotiation body with the Burmese central government.

The FPNCC was established on 19 April 2017, in Pangkham, the headquarters of the United Wa State Army. FPNCC was formed in response to the failure of the United Nationalities Federal Council to generate trust among member EAOs, four of which (KIA, SSPP, MNDAA, and AA) broke away from the council. The seven founding members were all non-signatories to the Nationwide Ceasefire Agreement.

In March 2023, in the aftermath of the 2021 Myanmar coup d'état and ongoing Myanmar civil war, the FPNCC officially called on China to help defuse the internal crisis in Myanmar.

== Members ==
As of March 2023, the FPNCC's members included:

Member	Armed wing
United Wa State Party (UWSP)	United Wa State Army (UWSA)
Kachin Independence Organization (KIO)	Kachin Independence Army (KIA)
Myanmar National Truth and Justice Party (MNTJP)	Myanmar National Democratic Alliance Army (MNDAA)
Palaung State Liberation Front (PSLF)	Ta'ang National Liberation Army (TNLA)
Peace and Solidarity Committee (PSC)	National Democratic Alliance Army (NDAA)
Shan State Progress Party (SSPP)	Shan State Army - North (SSA-N)
United League of Arakan (ULA)	Arakan Army (AA)

Some members of the committee are also in alliances with each other. MNDAA, AA and TNLA make up the Three Brotherhood Alliance and the three of them combined with the KIA make up the Northern Alliance.
