= Peace and Solidarity Committee =

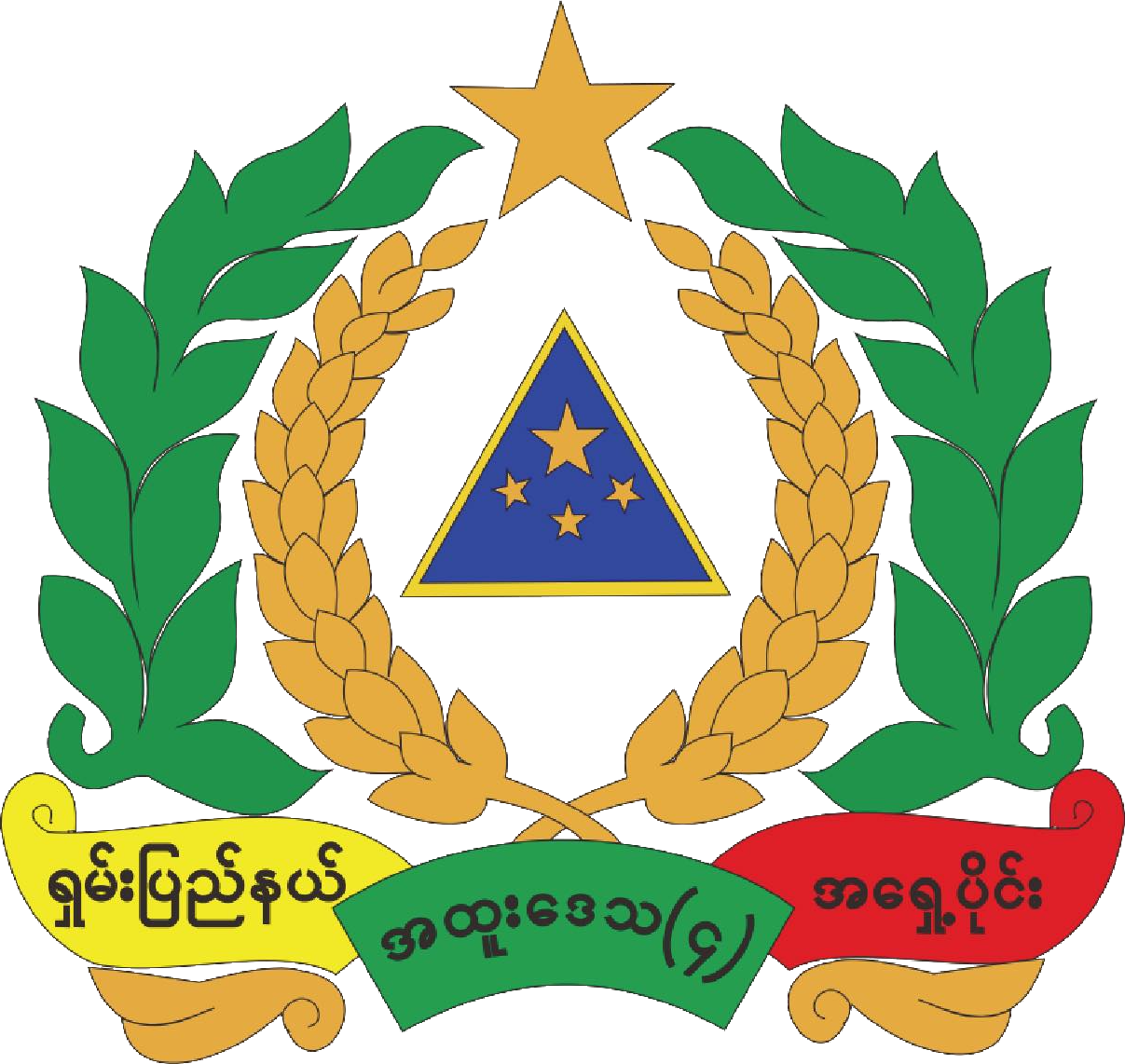
- Burmese name: ငြိမ်းချမ်းရေးနှင့် စည်းလုံးရေးကော်မတီ ngyizchan-yenhanga kilôn-yedawmadi
- Shan name: ၵေႃႇမတီႇၶွၼ်ႈတွမ်ၵတ်းယဵၼ် kŏ⸒matī⸒kʰon⹎tomkatːyen
- Chinese name: 和平与团结委员会; Hépíng yǔ tuánjié wěiyuánhuì
- Chairman: Htein Lin
- Founder: Sai Leun
- Founded: 19 April 1989; 37 years ago
- Split from: Communist Party of Burma
- Headquarters: Mong La
- Armed wing: National Democratic Alliance Army
- Ideology: Shan nationalism

Party flag
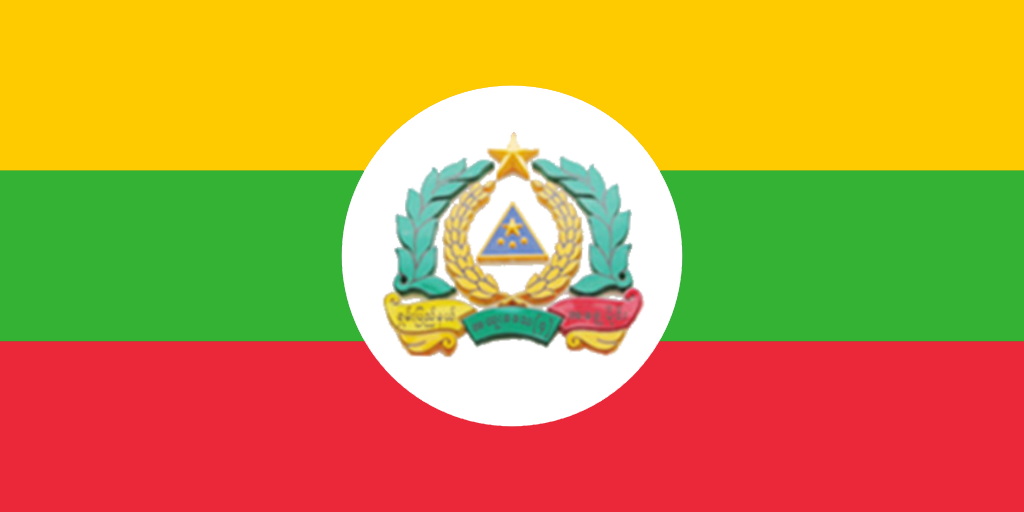

Peace and Solidarity Committee of the Eastern Shan State Special Region 4, Myanmar (Burmese: ရှမ်းပြည်နယ်အရှေ့ပိုင်း အထူးဒေသ(၄) ငြိမ်းချမ်းရေးနှင့် စည်းလုံးရေးကော်မတီ); abbreviated PSC), is a Shan political organisation in Shan State, Myanmar, founded in 1989 by Shan military leader Sai Leun. It is the political wing of the National Democratic Alliance Army (NDAA), and a member of the Federal Political Negotiation and Consultative Committee. It currently serves as the supreme leadership body of the Eastern Shan State Special Region 4 and effectively serves as the sole ruling party.

On April 19, 1989, after Sai Leun, commander of the 815th Military Region of the Communist Party of Burma (CPB), announced his separation from the CPB, he announced the establishment of the Eastern Shan State Military and Political Committee, assuming control of the 815th Military Region. On June 30, U Sai Leun reached a ceasefire and peace agreement with the Tatmadaw. Tatmadaw established the Eastern Shan State Special Region 4 in the area under U Sai Leun's rule. In 2005, the Military and Political Committee was renamed the Peace and Solidarity Committee.

The Peace and Unity Association's chairman is Htein Lin, son of Sai Leun. In January 2007, the Peace and Unity Association established a new secretariat, with Sai Leun's son, Htein Lin, serving as general secretary. Sai Leun has stepped back due to "health reasons," and most affairs are handled by Htein Lin.

The current leadership of the PSC is:

- Chairman: Htein Lin
- Vice Chairmen: San Pae and Khun Hsang Lu
- Standing Committee Member: Luo Changbao
- Secretary-General: Wu Jimin
- Standing Committee Members: Li Zhenglong, Wu Kangmao, and Wu Zaidi
- Secretary-General of the Secretariat: A Liu.

The Peace and Solidarity Committee of the Shan State Special Region 4 in eastern Myanmar is a member of the Federal Political Negotiation and Consultative Committee (FPNCC), a political negotiation group composed of seven ethnic armed groups in Myanmar.
