= Hsee Lu District =

Hsee Lu District (Burmese: ဆီလူးခရိုင်, Shan: ဢိူင်ႇသိုဝ်လိုဝ်း, Tai Lü: ᩋᩮᩨ᩠᩵ᨦᩈᩨᩃᩨ, Akha: Seerleeq mircoer, Chinese: 色勒县), formerly known as the Hsee Lu Region (Burmese: ဆီလူးဒေသ, Shan: ဢိူင်ႇမိူင်းသိုဝ်လိုဝ်း, Tai Lü: ᩋᩮᩨ᩠᩵ᨦᨾᩮᩨ᩠ᨦᩈᩨᩃᩨ, Chinese: 色勒地区), is a district in Eastern Shan State Special Region 4. It is located at the tri-border area of China and Myanmar.

Hsee Lu District administers 8 duingnais:

- Hsee Lu Duingnai ( ဆီလူးဒိုင်နယ် 色勒乡)
- Kying Hkam Duingnai ( ကျိန်းခမ်းဒိုင်နယ် 景坎乡)
- Ti Laung Duingnai ( တိလောင်းဒိုင်နယ် 德劳乡)
- Nam Khat Duingnai ( နမ့်ခပ်ဒိုင်နယ် 南佧乡)
- Nawng Hoke Duingnai ( နောင်ဟုတ်ဒိုင်နယ် 瑙侯乡)
- Moke Ken Duingnai ( မုတ်ကဲန်းဒိုင်နယ် 木尖乡)
- Yang Kawng Duingnai ( ယန်းကောင်ဒိုင်နယ် 养广乡)
- Wan Hkar Duingnai ( ဝမ်ခါးဒိုင်နယ် 万卡乡)
