= Tun Tun Myint =

Burmese army general

Brigadier General Tun Tun Myint (Burmese: ထွန်းထွန်းမြင့်) is a Burmese army general who surrendered to the MNDAA forces after the start of battles in Kokang Self-Administered Zone. He has served as the acting chairman of Kokang Self-Administered Zone (SAZ) and also the commander of the regional operations command. He, along with 2 other brigadier generals who were in charge of Laukkai's defense, were condemned to death by court martial for surrender.

== Career ==
Tun Tun Myint was promoted to brigadier general in 2020, following his role as deputy commander of the regional operations command in Laukkai, where he previously held the rank of colonel. He was born in Kunlong.

Following the fall of Laukkai to the Three Brotherhood Alliance, Min Aung Hlaing sentenced Tun Tun Myint and two other brigadier generals to death. They were charged under military law for "shamefully abandoning" their positions. The Laukkai loss marked the junta’s largest defeat since the 2021 coup.
