= Peng Daxun =

Burmese Kokang military leader

- 彭大顺 ဖုန်တာရွှင်
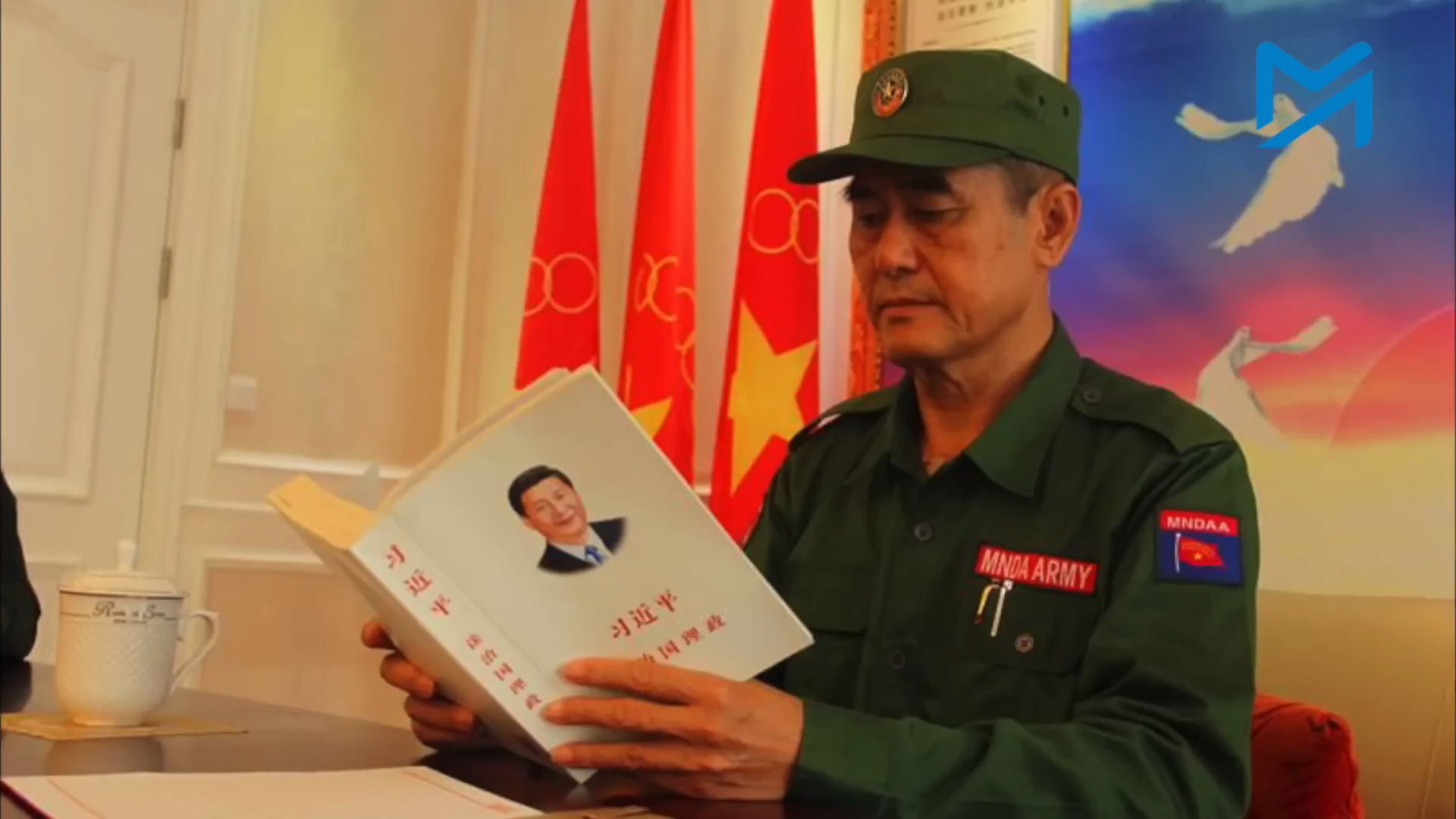
- Peng Daxun in 2024

Chairperson of the People's Government of Kokang
- Incumbent
- Assumed office 16 February 2022
- Deputy: Li Laobao, Peng Deli
- Preceded by: Peng Jiasheng

General Secretary of the Myanmar National Truth and Justice Party
- Incumbent
- Assumed office 29 June 2013
- Deputy: Yang Wenzhou
- Preceded by: position created

Commander of the Myanmar National Democratic Alliance Army
- Incumbent
- Assumed office 23 August 2009
- Deputy: Yang Wenzhou, Peng Dejun
- Preceded by: Peng Jiafu

Deputy Commander of the Myanmar National Democratic Alliance Army
- In office 12 March 1997 – 23 August 2009 Serving with Zhang Dewen, Bai Suocheng, Wang Guozheng, Wei Chaoren
- Commander: Peng Jiafu

Personal details
- Born: Peng Deren (彭德仁); July 16, 1957 (age 69) or 1965 (age 60–61) Haungsawhtuuhaw Village, Tarshwehtan, Kokang, Burma
- Party: Myanmar National Truth and Justice Party
- Other political affiliations: Communist Party of Burma (before 1989)
- Relations: Peng Jiasheng (father); Peng Jiafu (uncle); Peng Deli (brother); Daw Nang Yin (sister); U Sai Leun (brother-in-law)

Military service
- Allegiance: People's Army (1979–1989); MNDAA (1989–present)
- Years of service: 1979–present
- Rank: Lieutenant general (as of 2023), Commander in chief of the MNDAA
- Battles/wars: Internal conflict in Myanmar; 2009 Kokang incident; Myanmar civil war (2021–present); Operation 1027

Peng Daxun (Note: He signed as "彭大顺" in an open letter to Burmese soldiers. Other spellings include Pheung Daxun, Pheung Tar Shwin, Peng Ta-shung, and Peng Dashun.) (Chinese: 彭大顺; pinyin: Péng Dàshùn, Burmese: ဖုန်တာရွှင်), also known as Peng Deren (Chinese: 彭德仁; pinyin: Péng Dérén, born 1957 or 1965), is a Burmese Kokang military leader serving as commander of the Myanmar National Democratic Alliance Army (MNDAA) since 2009. He is the son of Pheung Kya-shin, his immediate predecessor as commander of the MNDAA, and had waged a war against the Tatmadaw and government of Myanmar to reclaim control over the region of Kokang.

Although he led the MNDAA to major victories against the Myanmar military in northern Shan State such as recapturing the Kokang region and the town of Lashio, he has since shifted in stance towards upholding China's peace policy in Myanmar after he was detained by Chinese authorities in Yunnan province in October 2024.

== Biography ==
Peng Daxun was born in 1957 or 1965 as the son of Peng Jiasheng (Pheung Kya-shin, 1931–2022), the first leader of the Myanmar National Democratic Alliance Army. In his early career, he served within the local police force of Kokang. In 2009, he became leader of the MNDAA, succeeding his father after the loss of Kokang Self-Administered Zone to the Tatmadaw. It was speculated that the elder Peng had been grooming his son to be his successor; however, in a telephone interview with Voice of America, he stated: "I am in this position now, to this extent, because of current events. Frankly speaking, it was forced by the Burmese government and the Burmese army. In fact, I didn’t want to engage in these things, armed revolution and martial arts. I didn't like engaging in these political activities." He also usually prefers to read historical books. Following the Tatmadaw takeover of Kokang SAZ, the four major groups within the MNDAA all defected to the Tatmadaw, leaving Peng to fight a guerrilla war.

By 2012, an arrest warrant for Peng remained outstanding in Myanmar, alleging that he, along with his father and two other leaders of the MNDAA, were illegally producing and selling weapons and ammunition. Peng's brother-in-law, Chinese-Burmese businessman Li Guoquan (also known as Hla Win), died in Tatmadaw custody in 2015.

In his efforts to retake Kokang, Peng has received support from other members of the Three Brotherhood Alliance, and the MNDAA has grown into one of Myanmar's most powerful ethnic armed organisations (EAOs). Following the 2021 Myanmar coup d'état, Peng intensified his efforts to recapture Kokang, including staging an assassination attempt against Bai Yingneng, the eldest son of Bai Xuoqian on 6 February 2021. As of 2023, the MNDAA is believed to have around 5,000 well-equipped soldiers.

Peng has been detained in Kunming, China in a family-owned hotel since late October 2024. He is being held to exert pressure on the MNDAA until they give up control of Lashio. However, the Chinese government denied this; they claim that he was seeking medical treatment.

On 18 January 2025, the MNDAA agreed to a ceasefire deal with the Myanmar military as brokered by China, reportedly with the condition that they cede control of Lashio to the military junta by June. By January 28, Peng issued a Chinese New Year message, his first public statement since the end of his detainment, pledging to "uphold China's favorable policy of 'encouraging peace and promoting dialogue' for Myanmar".
