= Nang Yin =

First Lady of Eastern Shan State Special Region 4

Daw Nang Yin

First Lady of Eastern Shan State Special Region 4
- Incumbent
- Assumed role 2001
- Leader: Sai Leun

Personal details
- Born: Kokang
- Spouse: Sai Leun
- Parent: Pheung Kya-shin (father)

Nang Yin (Burmese: နန်းရင်), commonly known as Daw Nang Yin, also known as her Chinese name Peng Xinchun (Chinese: 彭新春), is the former First Lady of Eastern Shan State Special Region 4 and wife of Sai Leun, the chairman of the National Democratic Alliance Army and the leader of the Eastern Shan State Special Region 4. She has high-ranking position in the Peace and Solidarity Committee (PSC) of Shan State-East. Nang was a major contributor to peace talks between National Democratic Alliance Army and the government of Myanmar.

She was born in Kokang, the eldest daughter of Pheung Kya-shin, the former chairman of the Shan State Special Region 1 in Myanmar (Burma) and leader of the Myanmar National Democratic Alliance Army (MNDAA).
