= Saloth Chhay =

Cambodian journalist and political activist

Saloth Chhay (Khmer: សាឡុត ឆ័យ, 1920 or 1922 – April, 1975) was a Cambodian left-wing journalist and political activist, who was prominent in the country's politics during the 1950s, 1960s and 1970s. He is best known for being the older brother of Pol Pot (Saloth Sar), future leader of the Khmer Rouge communists, and for influencing his early political development.

Chhay is thought to have been killed by the Khmer Rouge shortly after their victory in the Cambodian Civil War, or to have died during deportation from Phnom Penh.

== Life ==
Chhay was born into a prosperous peasant family in Prek Sbauv, Kampong Thom province. In the mid-1930s he went to live in Phnom Penh, staying with relatives who had connections at the court of Cambodia's king, Sisowath Monivong.

Chhay's interest in Cambodian independence, and leftist political convictions, led to him joining the nationalist guerrilla group led by Son Ngoc Thanh for a brief period in the early 1950s, and he also had contact with another prominent resistance (Khmer Issarak) leader, Prince Norodom Chantaraingsey, with whom he had shared contacts through the court.

Chhay initially encouraged his younger brother Saloth Sar, who had returned from Paris in 1953, to work with Chantaraingsey, but Sar rejected the prince as "feudal". Saloth Sar was, however, able to use Chhay's connections within the communist anti-colonial movement in order to gain contacts; Chhay spent time with the Viet Minh, who had a presence in the Cambodian border areas, taking his brother with him. His visit to the eastern headquarters of the United Issarak Front, the Cambodian communist resistance, paved the way for his brother's visit there in 1953.

Cambodia achieved independence in 1953 under the leadership of Prince Norodom Sihanouk. Chhay became an activist for the Pracheachon socialist party, the legal 'front' organization for the Cambodian communists. Chhay was, however, arrested in 1955 after his newspaper, Sammaki ('Solidarity'), publicly opposed Sihanouk's Cambodian-US Military Agreement.

During the later 1950s and early 1960s, the Pracheachon was repressed by Sihanouk's Sangkum movement. Chhay was again jailed in 1969, but was however to return to some prominence after the Cambodian coup of 1970, in which Sihanouk was deposed as Head of State by his Prime Minister, Lon Nol. During 1971 and 72 Chhay edited a semi-official newspaper, Prayojan Khmer, and was again associated with a resurrected Pracheachon party.

== Death ==
Chhay died shortly after the Khmer Rouge's entry into Phnom Penh on April 17, 1975. The communist administration ordered the city's immediate evacuation, citing a risk of American bombing and lack of food stocks, and nearly the entire population was deported to the countryside. Chhay is thought to have died, like thousands of others, en route, or possibly to have been killed by Khmer Rouge troops.

== Sources ==
- Corfield, J. Khmers stand up!: a history of the Cambodian government 1970-1975, Monash University, 1994, ISBN 978-0-7326-0565-0
- Chandler, D. Brother number one: a political biography of Pol Pot, Westview, 1999, ISBN 978-0-8133-3510-0
- Kiernan, B. How Pol Pot came to power, Yale UP, 2004
