= People's Government of Kokang =

Rival regional government in Kokang

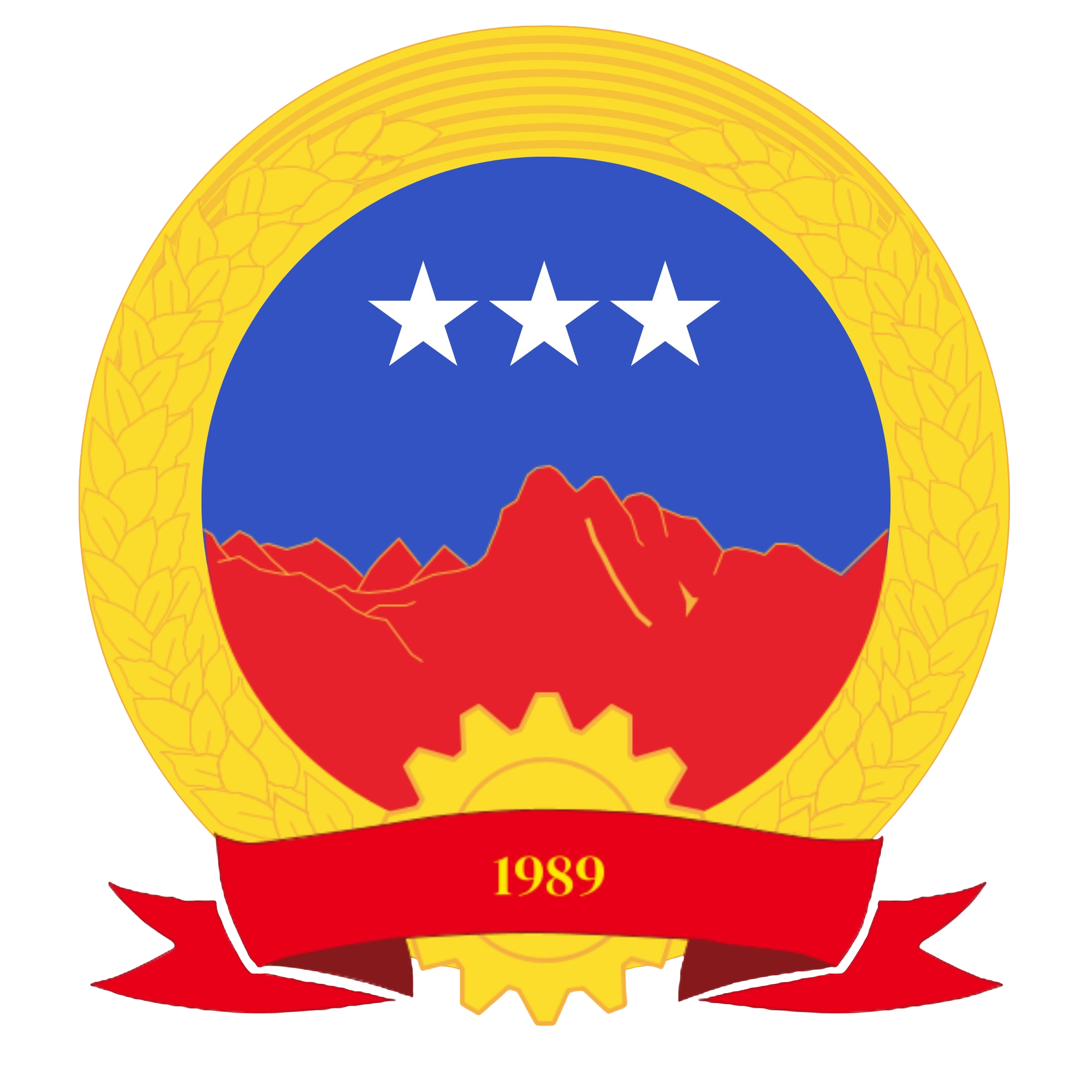
- Flags Coat of arms

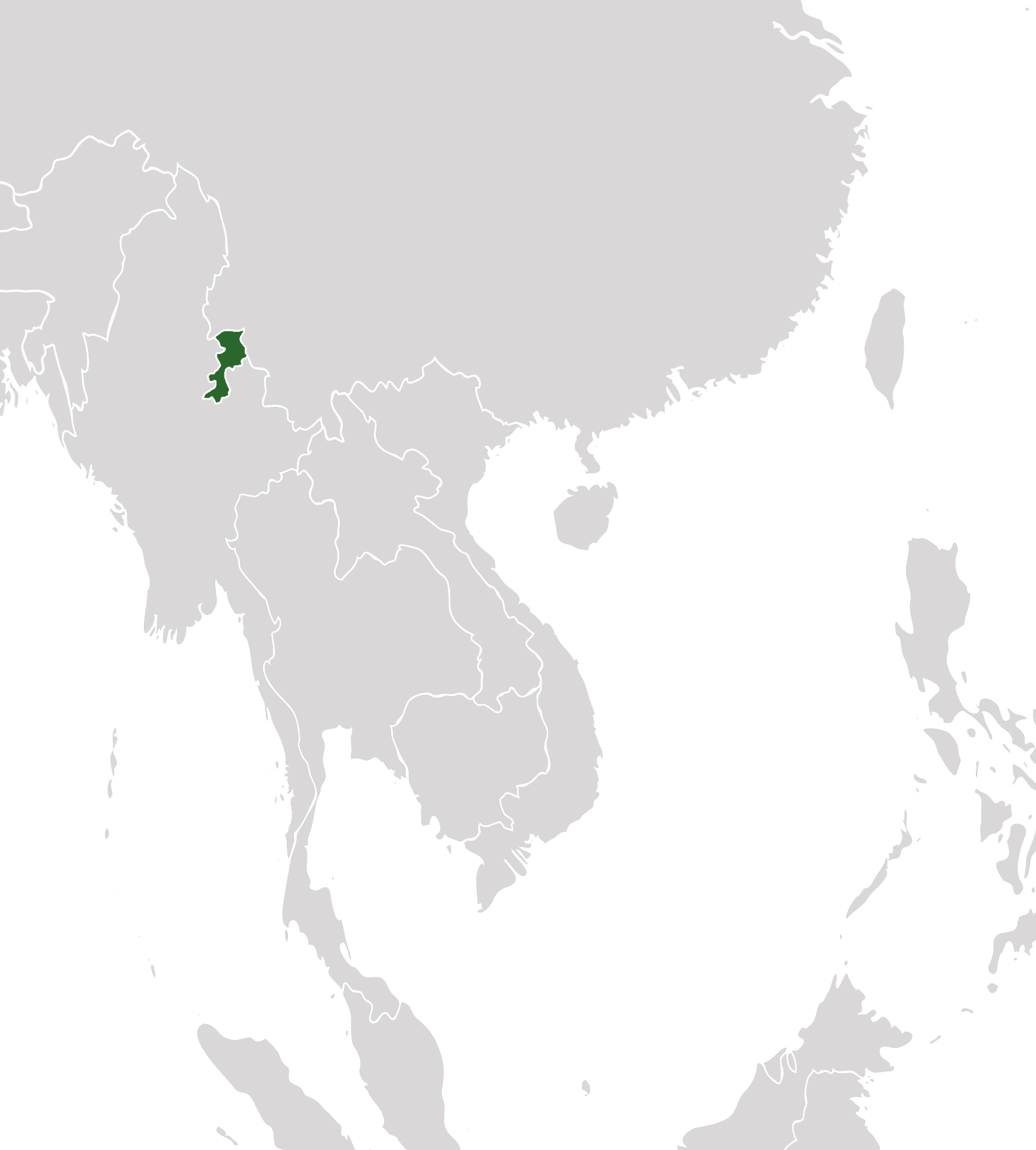
- Myanmar National Democratic Alliance Army
- Status: Rival government and De-facto state
- Capital: Laukkai
- Official languages: Burmese and Chinese
- Government: Self-proclaimed government
- Chairperson
  - 2011–2022: Pheung Kya-shin
  - Since 2022: Peng Daxun
- Vice-Chairperson
  - Since Unknown: Li Laobao and Peng Deli
- Secretary-General
  - Since Unknown: Song Kecheng
- Establishment: Myanmar conflict
  - Established: March 2011 (Note: In March 2011, the Republic of the Union of Myanmar issued Presidential Decree No.22/2011, officially establishing the Kokang Autonomous Region of Shan State of Myanmar. However, MNDAA's remaining armed forces did not recognize the new government. They occupied some mountainous areas and established the People's Government of Kokang.)
  - 2015 Kokang offensive: 9 February 2015 – June 2015
  - Battle of Laukkai: 15 November 2023 – 5 January 2024

Area
  - Total: 17.000 km^{2} (6.564 sq mi)

Population
  - 2025 estimate: 581,800

The People's Government of Kokang or since 2024 often called by the media Kokang Special Region 1 (Note: often shorten to Special Region 1.) (Note: Referring to the former Special Region 1 of the Union of Myanmar which existed from 1990 until 2009.) is the self-proclaimed government of Kokang by the Myanmar National Democratic Alliance Army.

== Background ==
In 1989, Peng Jiasheng's Myanmar National Democratic Alliance Army (MNDAA) took control of the region. A ceasefire between the group and the Tatmadaw was signed in the same year; the area controlled by MNDAA was assigned as the autonomous "First Special Region" of Shan State. Twenty years later, in 2009, the Tatmadaw asked that the MNDAA become a border guard under the army's direction, which the MNDAA refused; in response, the Tatmadaw started an operation against the autonomous government. The operation lasted from 20 August 2009 until 30 August 2009 and ended with a victory for the Tatmadaw and by members of the pro-junta MNDAA faction like Bai Suocheng. Peng Jiasheng MNDAA loyalists fled to China. With it the Kokang Preliminary Government of the Special Region was in control by Bai Suocheng.

Later, on 30 August, the government of Myanmar formed the "Kokang Region Provisional Leading Committee" in Laukkai to replace the autonomous area Special Region 1 of the Union of Myanmar. On 20 or 27 August 2010 the Kokang area became the Kokang Self-Administered Zone, however, it was recognized as illegal by the MNDAA.

== Formation ==
The Republic of the Union of Myanmar issued a Presidential Decree No.22/2011, which officially established the Kokang Autonomous Region of Shan State of Myanmar or officially still called Kokang Self-Administered Zone in March 2011. The Myanmar National Democratic Alliance Army rejected the presidential decree and occupied mountainous areas in Kokang and proclaimed the People's Government of Kokang.

== Naming ==
Already before the renaming the People's Government of Kokang had other names which were used, like Liberated Area, Shan State Special Region 1 which was used between 2015 and 2016 and First Special Region used in 2021. The People's Government of Kokang restored the Special Region 1 and the name of Kokang Special Region 1 was then used by the media. (Note: Referring to the former Special Region 1 of the Union of Myanmar which existed from 1990 until 2009.) In 2024 Kokang Self-administered Zone was also used as name, while in 2025 Kokang Special Administrative Region (SAR) and MNDAA-controlled territory of Shan State Special Region 1 were used as names and in 2026, MNDAA-administered Special Region (1). Besides all this, the MNDAA call it's territory still People's Government of Kokang (Kokang County People’s Government and People’s Government of Kokang County, Special Zone No. 1) or Special Region 1, Union of Myanmar, the same name as the former autonomous special region, which was dissolved in 2009.

== Government ==
Chairperson of Kokang Special Region 1 Administrative Committee
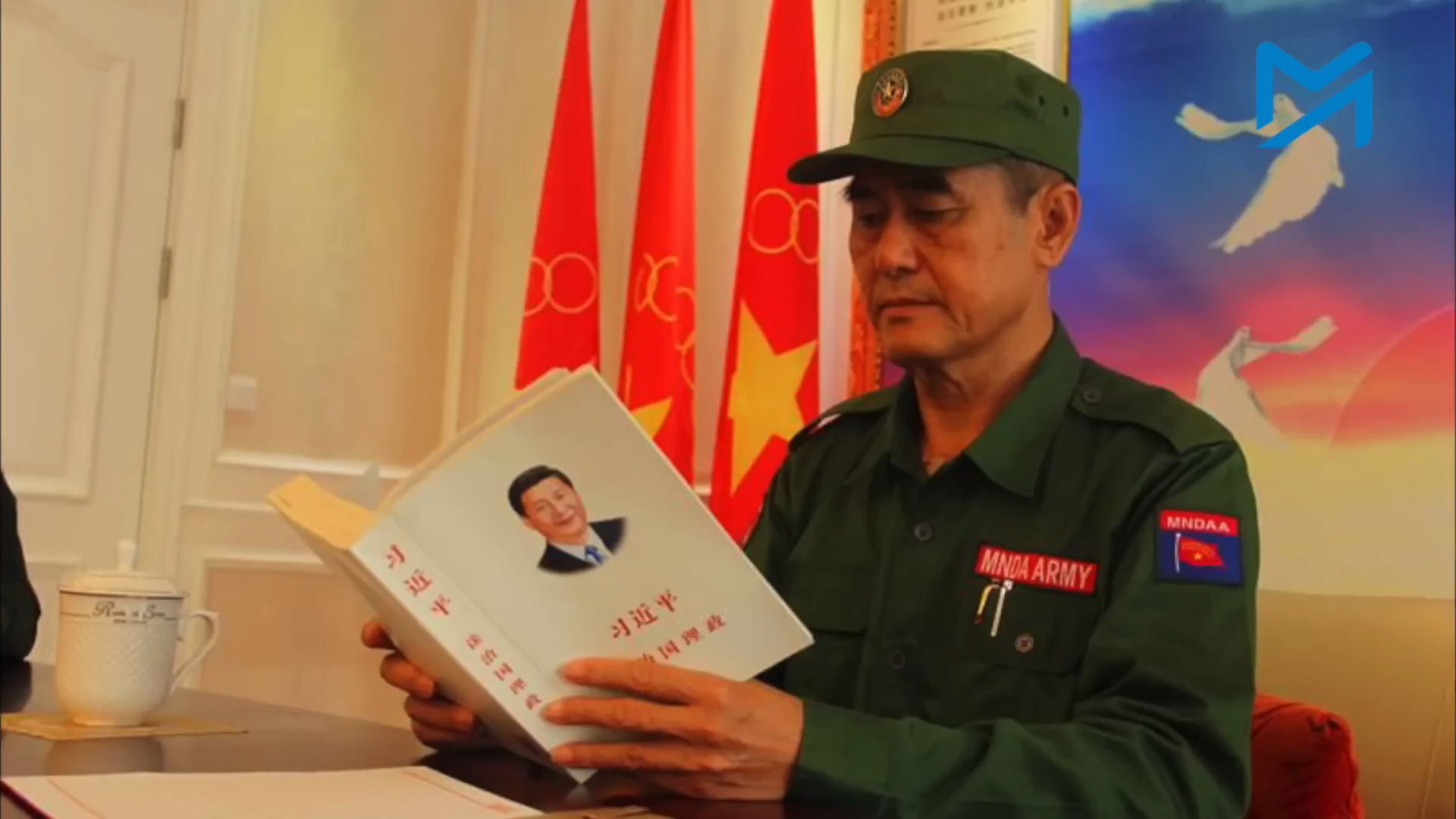
- Peng Daxun since 16 February 2022
- Type: Head of Executive
- Member of: Kokang Regional Administrative Committee
- Seat: Laukkai
- Formation: March 2011
- First holder: Pheung Kya-shin
- Deputy: Vice-Chairperson

=== Government model ===
Sai Htay Aung described the model of the territory of the MNDAA as the same as the Wa State model.

=== Public services ===
The People's Government of Kokang issues its own identification cards. The MNDAA’s Kokang District Administration The MNDAA launched a public service initiative to issue identification cards and household registration documents.

=== Foreign relations ===
Reportedly Peng Daxun has relations with authorities of the People's Republic of China.

==== Relations with Myanmar ====
In March 2024, it was spread that the government of Myanmar recognized the MNDAA government of Kokang as the legitimate government, which however wasn't true.

=== Military ===
The Myanmar National Democratic Alliance Army which is itself already a military group founded four brigades.

- Brigade 211 which is based in the headquarters area of the Hon Aing Mountain and the Konkyan Township
- Brigade 311 operates in the Kunlong, Hseni, Kutkai, and Lashio regions
- Brigade 511 operates in Monekoe Sub-Township and the Muse District
- Brigade 611 operates in Lashio Township

Since May 2026, the MNDAA is recruiting new soldiers.

=== Planning of the establishment of civilian-administrations ===
The MNDAA plans to establish civilian administration in their territory.

=== Other ===
The MNDAA has its own Executive Committee.

The MNDAA also seized private land.

== Territorial development ==
=== Clashes in 2015 ===
Clashes erupted on 9 February 2015 between the MNDAA the and the Tatmadaw, the conflict ended in June 2015.

=== Capturing of Chinshwehaw ===
On 28 October 2023 it was reported that Chinshwehaw had come fully under control of the MNDAA.

=== Capturing of Laukkai ===
Since the MNDAA began closing in onto Laukkai in November 2025, the city has seen a mass exodus. In late November 2023, the MNDAA opened a humanitarian corridor for migrant workers in Laukkai to flee to Lashio through Laukkaing and Kunlong townships, and Wa state. The corridor was however not used for ethnic Kokang people. Many Kokangs fled towards the Chinese border, but had tear gas fired on them by the Chinese authorities.

On 6 December, the MNDAA captured the strategic Four Buddhist Statues Hill after three days of fighting against the Tatmadaw. The pagoda is located on a hill overlooking Laukkai and was the junta's last outpost before Laukkai.

On 15 December 2023, China mediated a temporary ceasefire between the Tatmadaw and the MNDAA in Kunming. The ceasefire ended on 18 December after the junta launched airstrikes on a base controlled by the MNDAA. Following this, the MNDAA captured the Yanlonkyaing border gate on the Chinese border north of Laukkai on 19 December.

On 28 December 2023 it was reported that "most" of Laukkai was now under MNDAA control, with junta forces largely abandoning the city.

On 1 January 2024, still when the battle was still ongoing, Peng Daxun adresssed in his New Year speech to "eradicate" online scam centres.

The MNDAA gained full control of Laukkai following a mass surrender of the last junta forces in the city on 5 January 2024. Other areas are jointly governed by the MNDAA and it's allies.

=== 2025 ===
On 18 April 2025, the MNDAA retreated out of Lashio after taking it in 2024.

In May 2025, the MNDAA and the government of Myanmar agreed that the Myanmar government would govern Lashio and the MNDAA it's surroundings.

On 29 December 2025, the MNDAA and the government of Myanmar held talks in Lashio City, the MNDAA agreed to remove its checkpoints along the Union Highway connecting Lashio and Hsipaw (Thibaw). Later the Thibaw Bridge, which connects Hsipaw Town and Lashio City was closed, also the MNDAA also withdrew its troops stationed between Hsipaw Town and Namlan Village, relocating them to Hsawngkye and Hsinkyawt village tracts in Thibaw Township, and Hoya Village Tract in Mongyai Township.

=== 2026 ===
In March 2026 the MNDAA took over Kutkai from its former ally Ta'ang National Liberation Army. After taking the whole of Kutkai, they changed Ta'ang language signs into Chinese ones in April 2026, the same month the MNDAA said that they won't interfere in the Kachin Independence Army administration in Namhpatkar. In May 2026 it was reported that the MNDAA in its territory acts to establish Chinese dominance in Myanmar. In June 2026, the MNDAA handed over 200 POW to Myanmar. In July, the MNDAA started to dismantle KIA checkpoints. Since 7 November, the MNDAA claims the TNLA controlled Namkham Township as there territory.

== Subdivision ==
Hongyan liberated areas
- Subdivision
- Interactive map of Hongyan liberated areas
- Country: People's Government of Kokang
- Established: 2011

Government
  - Leader: Unknown (Myanmar National Democratic Alliance Army)

=== Hongyan liberated areas ===
The People's Government of Kokang established in 2011 the Hongyan liberated areas in the northeastern part of Kokang.

=== Kokang District ===
In July 2026, the existence of the Kokang District was firstly reported.

=== Administrative divisions of the SAR ===
After the MNDAA renamed it's territory in 2024, the areas were divided into four provinces:

- Kutkai Province
- Hsenwi Province
- Monekoe Province
- Laukkai Province

==== Administrative divisions of Laukkai ====
After MNDAA regained control of Laukkai in 2024, the city was divided into three wards:

- Dongcheng Ward (东城区)
- Laukkai Ward (老街区)
- Jinxiangcheng Ward (金象城区)

== See also ==
- Ta'ang People's Government
- Wa State
- Chinland
- Karenni State Interim Executive Council
- Republic of Kawthoolei
- Sagaing Federal Unit Interim Government
- Territory of the Kachin Independence Army
- Territory of the Arakan Army
