= Htein Lin (colonel) =

Burmese military officer

General Htein Lin (Burmese: ထိန်လင်း) is a Burmese military officer and a member of the Advisory Board of State Administration Council (SAC). He previously served as the Minister of Security and Border Affairs of Rakhine State until 2017. He then served as the adviser to the President Win Myint on peace issues from April 2020 to the end of January 2021. He played an important role in the peace process as it relates to Arakan State.
