= Khieu Ponnary =

First wife of Pol Pot (1920–2003)

- ខៀវ ពណ្ណារី

Spouse of the Prime Minister of Democratic Kampuchea
- In role 25 October 1976 – 7 January 1979
- Prime Minister: Pol Pot
- Preceded by: Ly Kimseng
- Succeeded by: Sao Ty as Spouse of the Prime Minister of the PRK
- In role 14 April 1976 – 27 September 1976
- Prime Minister: Pol Pot
- Preceded by: So Socheat (Acting)
- Succeeded by: Ly Kimseng

Personal details
- Born: 3 February 1920 Battambang Province, Cambodia, French Indochina
- Died: 1 July 2003 (aged 83) Pailin Province, Cambodia
- Party: Communist Party of Kampuchea
- Spouse(s): Pol Pot (m. 1956; div. 1979)
- Relations: Khieu Thirith (sister)

Khieu Ponnary (Khmer: ខៀវ ពណ្ណារី, 3 February 1920 – 1 July 2003) was the first wife of Pol Pot and served as Spouse of the Prime Minister of Democratic Kampuchea. She was also the sister of Khieu Thirith and sister-in-law to Ieng Sary.

== Biography ==
Khieu Ponnary was born on 3 February 1920 in Battambang province, and her sister, Khieu Thirith, was born about 12 years later. Their father, a Cambodian judge, abandoned the family during World War II, running off to Battambang with a Cambodian princess. As a member of a privileged family, she was educated at the Lycée Sisowath. Her younger sister, Khieu Thirith, and their future husbands, Ieng Sary and Saloth Sar (later Pol Pot) also attended. Graduating from the Lycee in 1940, she became the first Cambodian woman to receive a baccalaureate degree.

In 1949, she left Cambodia with her younger sister (who was engaged to Ieng Sary) for Paris where she studied Khmer linguistics. In Paris, her sister married Ieng Sary in 1951 and took his name, becoming Ieng Thirith. Returning to Cambodia she married Saloth Sar (later Pol Pot) on Bastille Day, 1956. Together the two sisters and their husbands later became known as 'Cambodia's Gang of Four', a reference to the radical group led by Jiang Qing, the widow of Mao Tse-tung. Ponnary returned to Lycee Sisowath as a teacher, while her husband taught at Chamraon Vichea, a new private college.

Information about her role in party activities during the 1960s is fragmentary. However, she was appointed to work on propaganda and education as president of the Democratic Kampuchea Women's Association in 1972, was the Party Secretary for Kampong Thom province in 1973, and the President of the Democratic Kampuchea Women's Association in 1976. When she was going through periods of illness, she was cared for by Pol Pot's cook Yong Moeun, and when she was healthy, she travelled around the country with her, from Kompong Cham to Preah Vihear, from 1972 until 1975, when she was no longer able to work.

By at least 1975, Ponnary was growing increasingly disturbed from the onset of chronic schizophrenia. She became extremely paranoid and was convinced that the Vietnamese were trying to assassinate her and her husband. Pol Pot divorced her in 1979 after the Vietnamese invasion and took a second wife.

In 1996, Ponnary, together with her sister and brother-in-law, were granted amnesty from prosecution by the Cambodian government. Ponnary was cared for by her sister and her sister's husband Ieng Sary. The latter said:

She knows nothing. Even me she does not remember. I pity her very much, but I don't know how to help her, as she has a disease which is difficult to cure.

She died in Pailin on July 1, 2003, aged 83.
