= Zeng Shan =

Zeng Shan

Zeng Shan (Chinese: 曾山; Wade–Giles: Tseng Shan; 1899–1972) was a Chinese Communist revolutionary, military commander, and security minister. His wife, Deng Liujin (邓六金), was one of the few women who participated in the Long March, and later ran the East China Nursery School (华东保育院), a wartime school for the children of high cadres and revolutionary martyrs together with Wei Wenbo's wife, Li Jingyi.

Zeng was also the father of Zeng Qinghong, who later rose to become a Politburo Standing Committee member and later Vice President of the People’s Republic of China from 2003 to 2008.

Born in Ji'an, Jiangxi, Zeng joined the Chinese Communist Party in October of 1926, and later participated in both the Nanchang and Guangzhou Uprisings in 1927. backed Mao Zedong in the Jiangxi Soviet confrontation with Li Lisan, and was at one point Chairman of the Chinese Soviet Republic government. He was a key player in the violent 1931 purge of the so-called Anti-Bolshevik Corps.

Zeng did not participate in the Long March, but rather stayed behind to command a small guerrilla unit on the Guangdong-Guangxi border. After his guerrilla unit suffered great losses in 1935, he travelled to Shanghai, and was sent to study at the International Lenin School in Moscow in August of the same year. Throughout the Second Sino-Japanese War, his key contributions included assisting Xiang Ying in the formation of the New Fourth Army, serving as the Party Secretary of Jiangxi, and serving as Deputy Secretary of the then-extant Southeast Bureau of the Central Committee of the CCP.

By the end of the Civil War, Zeng was serving in the Third Field Army’s 10th Army under Ye Fei, and had become a member of the 8th and 9th Central Committees. Simultaneously, he was the Head of the Financial Commission of the East China Bureau of the CCP Central Committee. Shortly after the founding of the People's Republic, he served as China's first Commerce Minister, and later served as Minister of Internal Affairs (i.e., security) from 1960 to October 1969.

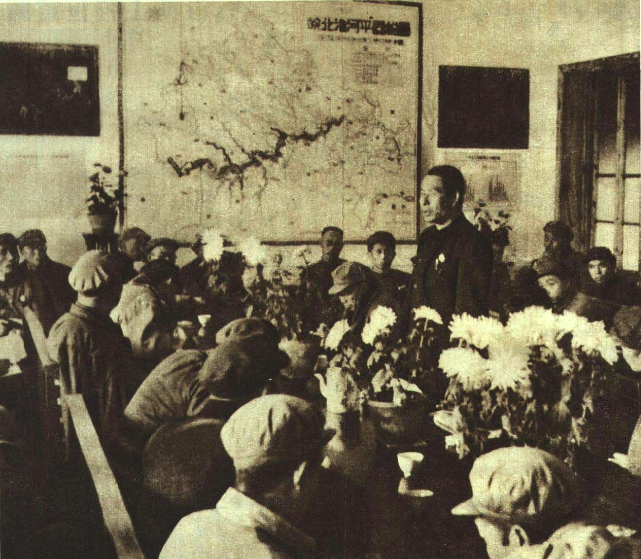
Zeng Shan presiding over a meeting in 1950 in Fuyang, Anhui, during Mao's Great Campaign to Harness the Huai River
