= Zeng family =

Zeng 曾
- Country: China
- Current region: Beijing, China
- Origin: Jiangxi
- Founder: Zeng Shan
- Members: Zeng Shan; Zeng Qinghong; Zeng Haisheng; Zeng Qinghuai; Zeng Qingyuan

In this Chinese name, the family name is Zeng.

The Zeng family is a Chinese political family of Hakka background from Ji'an, Jiangxi province, related to Zeng Shan, a Chinese Communist revolutionary, military commander who served as Chairman of the Chinese Soviet Republic government, and later a security minister under Mao Zedong; and his wife Deng Liujin, one of the few women who participated in the Long March and later ran a school for the children of high cadres. The Zeng family backed Mao Zedong in the Jiangxi Soviet confrontation against Li Lisan and in the Chinese civil war. Their immediate family has held senior positions in Chinese politics since the founding of the People's Republic of China. In 2002, Zeng Shan's son, Zeng Qinghong, was appointed First Secretary of Central Secretariat of the Chinese Communist Party, and in 2003, the 7th Vice President of the People's Republic of China. Qinghong's brother, Zeng Qinghuai served as director of China Cultural Exchange Association, a company in Hong Kong, and his sister, Zeng Haisheng as Major General of the People's Liberation Army from 2001 to present.

== Offices held ==
Zeng Shan 曾山

- Minister of Civil Affairs (1960 to October 1969)
- Chairman of the Chinese Soviet Republic

Zeng Qinghong 曾庆红

- Vice President of the People's Republic of China (15 March 2003 – 15 March 2008)
- First Secretary of Central Secretariat of the Chinese Communist Party (15 November 2002 – 22 October 2007)
- President of the Central Party School of the Chinese Communist Party (December 2002 – December 2007)
- Head of the Organization Department of the Chinese Communist Party (March 1999 – November 2002)
- Head of the General Office of the Chinese Communist Party (March 1993 – March 1999)

Zeng Haisheng 曾海生

- Major General of the People's Liberation Army (2001 – Present)
- Director of the Political Department of the General Staff Office (July 1999 – July 2001)
- Member of the Eleventh National Committee of the Chinese People's Political Consultative Conference

Zeng Qinghuai 曾庆淮

- Director of China Cultural Exchange Association
- Vice Chairman of the Chinese National Culture Promotion Association

Zeng Qingyuan 曾庆源

- Major General of the Air Force of the Chinese People's Liberation Army (1999 – 2010)

== See also ==
- Political families of the world
