= Ieng Thirith =

Khmer Rouge cadre

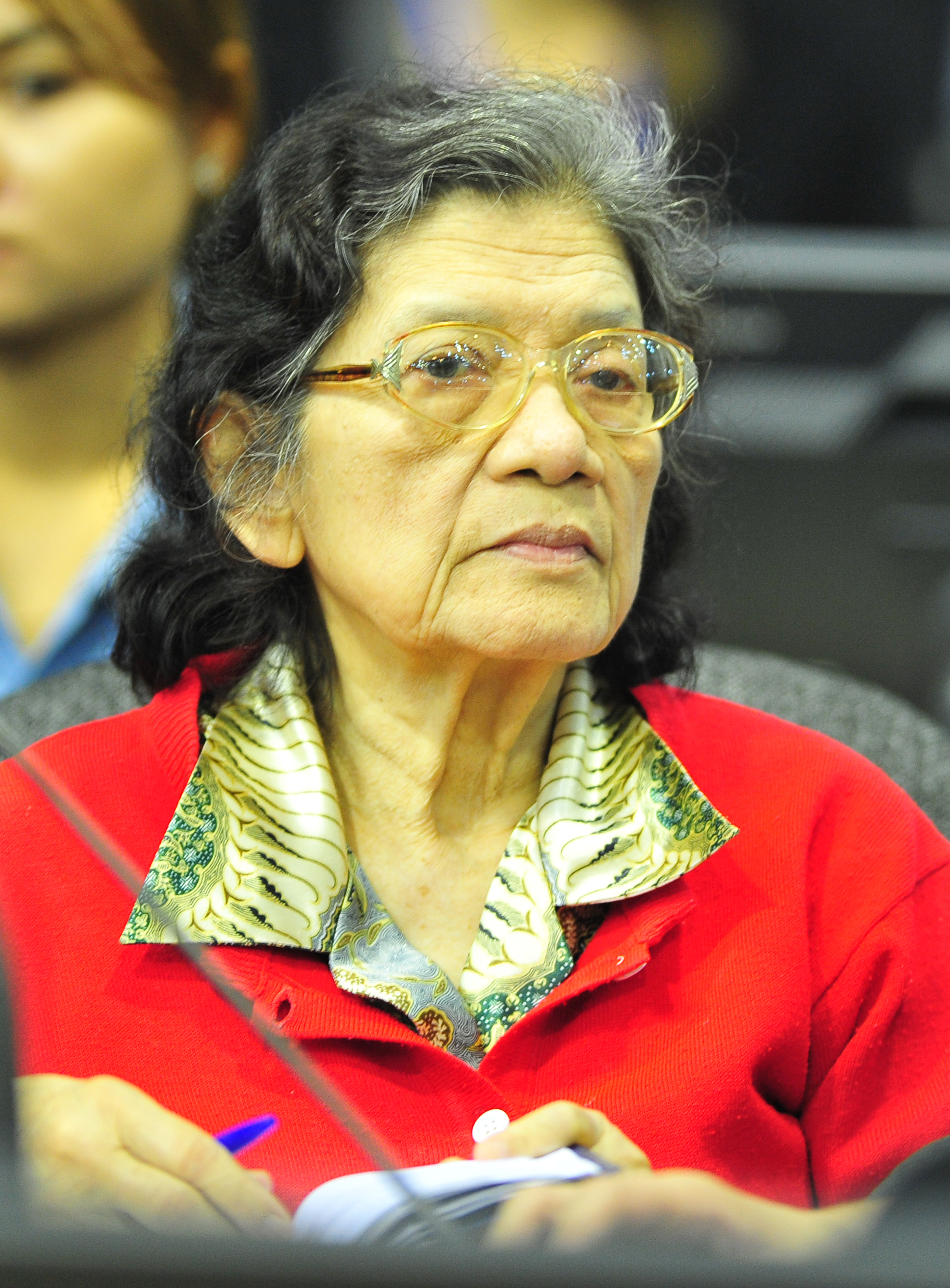

Minister of Social Affairs
- In office 9 October 1975 – 7 January 1979
- Prime Minister: Pol Pot

Personal details
- Born: Khieu Thirith; 10 March 1932 Phnom Penh, Cambodia, French Indochina
- Died: 22 August 2015 (aged 83) Pailin, Cambodia
- Spouse: Ieng Sary (m. 1951; died 2013)
- Relations: Khieu Ponnary (sister)

Ieng Thirith (née Khieu; Khmer: អៀង ធីរិទ្ធ, romanized: Iang Thiruĕt; 10 March 1932 – 22 August 2015) was an influential intellectual and politician in the Khmer Rouge, although she was neither a member of the Khmer Rouge Standing Committee nor of the Central Committee. Ieng Thirith was the wife of Ieng Sary, who was Minister of Foreign Affairs of Democratic Kampuchea's Khmer Rouge regime. She served as Minister of Social Affairs from October 1975 until the fall of the Khmer Rouge in 1979.

She was the sister of Khieu Ponnary, who was the first wife of Pol Pot. She was arrested by the Extraordinary Chamber in the Courts of Cambodia (ECCC) in November 2007 with her husband, Ieng Sary, on suspicion of genocide, war crimes and crimes against humanity.

== Early years ==
Born on 10 March 1932, in Phnom Penh, Cambodia, she came from a relatively wealthy and privileged family, and was the second daughter of a Cambodian judge who abandoned the family during World War II, running off to Battambang with a Cambodian princess.

Thirith graduated from the Lycée Sisowath in Phnom Penh, and while still in Cambodia she became engaged to Ieng Sary, who attended Lycée in the year above her. She went on to Paris with her sister, where she studied English literature, majoring in Shakespeare at the Sorbonne. She became the first Cambodian to achieve a degree in English literature.

Thirith married Ieng Sary in the town hall of Paris' 15th arrondissement the summer of 1951 and took her husband's name, becoming Ieng Thirith. Her older sister, Khieu Ponnary, later became the wife of Pol Pot. Together, the two sisters and their husbands later became known as "Cambodia's Gang of Four", a reference to the radical group led by Jiang Qing (Chiang Ching), the widow/wife of Chinese communist leader Mao Tse-tung.

She returned to her native Cambodia in 1957 and worked as a professor before founding a private English school in 1960.

== During the Democratic Kampuchea regime ==
She was a senior member of the Democratic Kampuchea (DK) regime.

From 1975 to 1979, Thirith was Minister of Social Affairs and Action and Head of Democratic Kampuchea's Red Cross Society.

== Later years ==
Thirith lived with her husband, Ieng Sary, in a luxurious villa on Street 21, in southern Phnom Penh. Until her arrest, she was rarely seen in public.

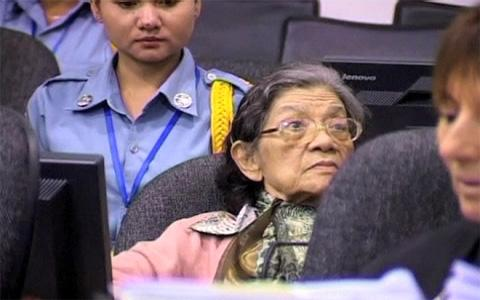
Thirith on trial in 2011

By 2006, Ieng Thirith and her husband had retained foreign legal counsel to assist with their defence as the Cambodia Tribunal made progress with courtroom preparation and judge selection. She was arrested, along with ailing Ieng Sary, on 12 November 2007, at their home in Phnom Penh, after being indicted by the Cambodia Tribunal.

She was arrested for crimes against humanity: "planning, direction, coordination and ordering of widespread purges ... and the unlawful killing or murder of staff members from within the Ministry of Social Affairs." On 17 November 2011, Thirith was ruled mentally unfit to stand trial, due to her severe case of Alzheimer's disease, and was ordered to be released. Prosecutors appealed against her release. On 13 December 2011, appeals judges reversed the ruling to release Thirith and ordered new medical exams to see how mentally fit she was to stand trial. In September 2012, the November 2011 ruling of her mental incompetence was restored, and she was released from prison.

She died on 22 August 2015 at the age of 83 from complications of the disease.
