= Eastern Shan State Special Region 4 =

Special administrative region in Myanmar

Coordinates: 21°39′N 100°03′E

Eastern Shan State Special Region 4 ရှမ်းပြည်နယ်အရှေ့ပိုင်း အထူးဒေသ(၄) (Burmese) 缅甸掸邦东部第四特区 (Chinese) ဢိူင်ႇၽိသဵတ်ႇမၢႆ(4)၊ မိူင်းတႆးပွတ်းဝၼ်းဢွၵ်ႇ (Shan) Biqcmq khanq dovkhaeq paw, (4)dev mircoer (Hani) Lesser Mongla
- De jure Non-Autonomous Special region/De facto Autonomous Special region (1989–2021) De facto independent state (2021–Circa. 2022) De jure Non-Autonomous Special region/De facto Autonomous Special region (Circa. 2022–present)
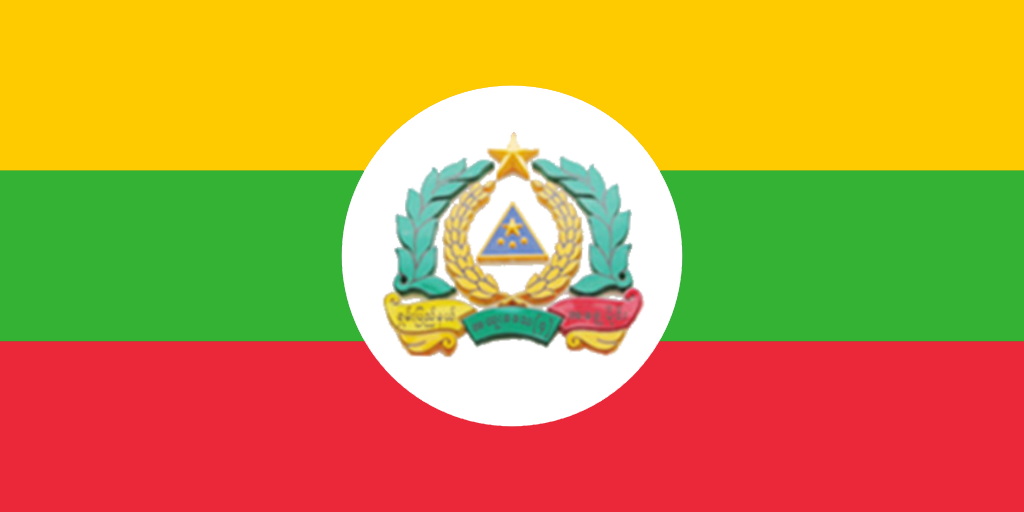
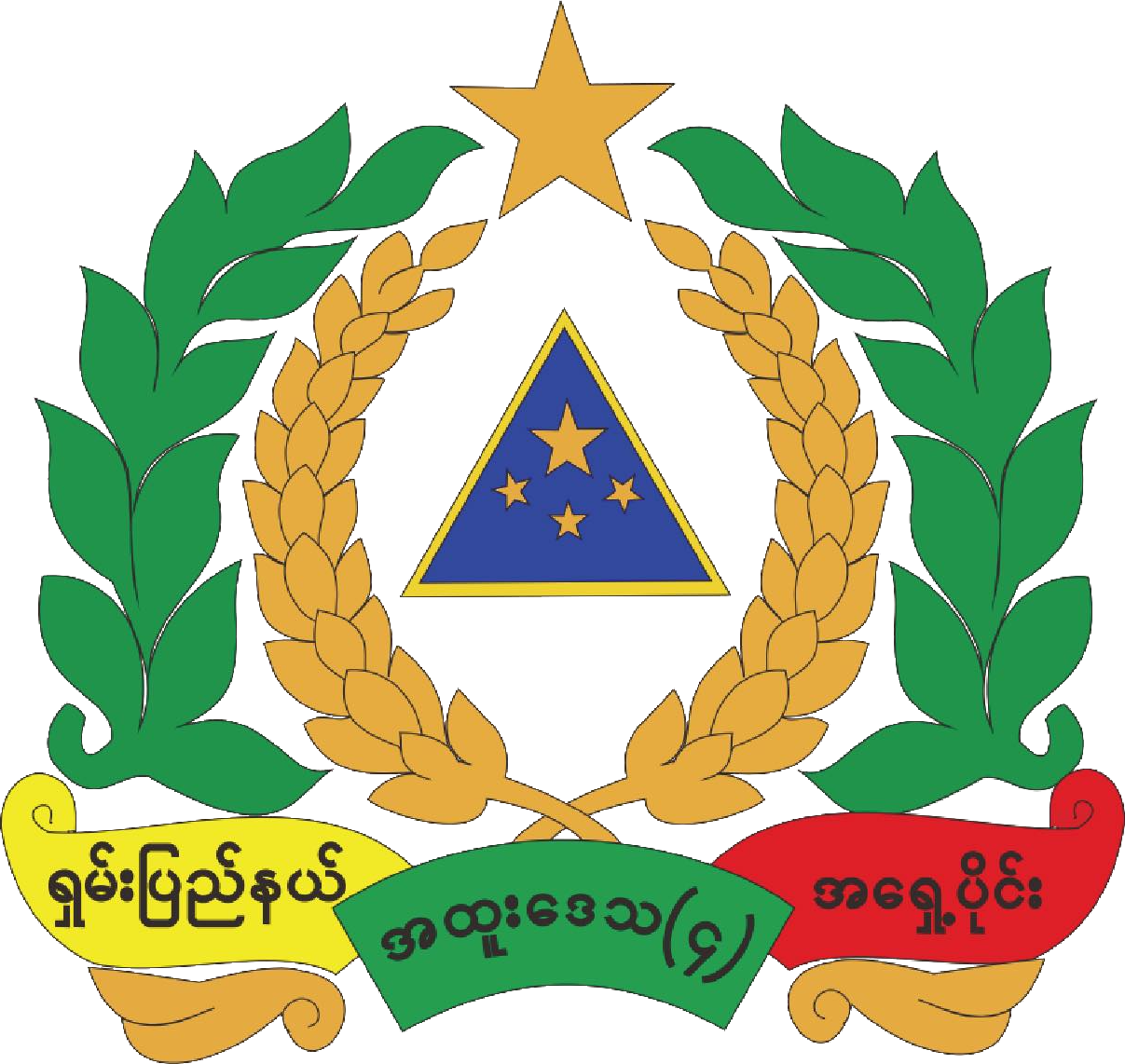
- Flag Emblem
- Anthem: Kaba Ma Kyei
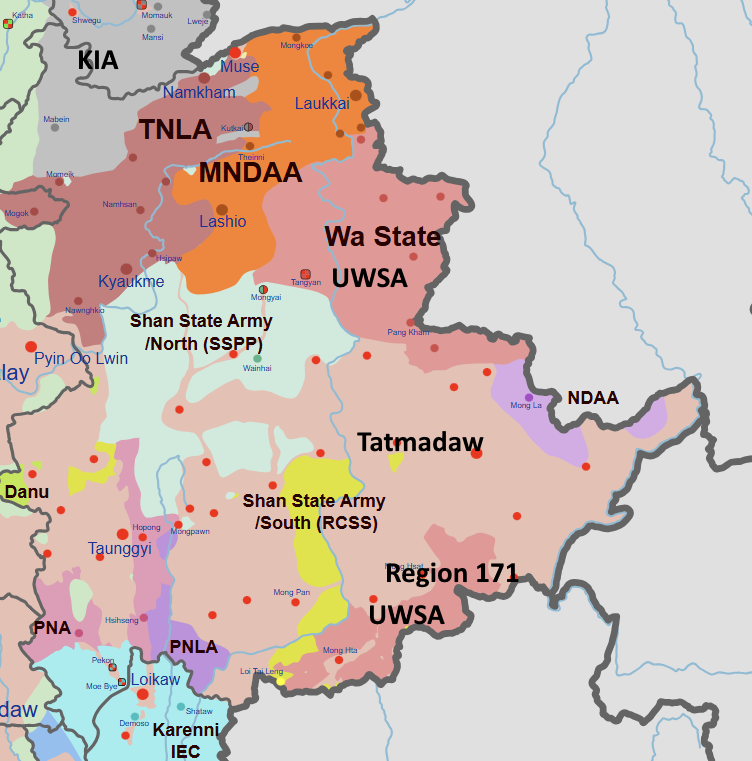
- Situation of the Eastern Shan State Special Region 4 in 2025
- Interactive map of Eastern Shan State Special Region 4
- Country: Myanmar
- State: Shan State
- No. of townships: 3
- Formation of the NDAA and SR4–ESS: 30 June 1989
- Capital: Mong La
- Official languages: Burmese; Chinese; Tai; Hani
- Government: Self-administered Region
  - President: U Htein Lin (Lin Daode)
  - Vice President: Wu Sang Bai; Khun Hsang Lu
  - Special Region Administrative Leader: Yan Xiang La
  - Secretary of Special Region 4's Peace and Unity Committee: Kyi Myint

Area
  - Total: 4,952 km^{2} (1,912 sq mi)

Population
  - 2013 census: 116,887
- Currency: Renminbi
- Time zone: UTC+6:30 (MMT)
- Driving side: right
- Calling code: +86 (0)691
- Website: www.4tzx.com

Eastern Shan State Special Region 4 (Burmese: ရှမ်းပြည်နယ်အရှေ့ပိုင်း အထူးဒေသ(၄), Chinese: 缅甸掸邦东部第四特区), commonly known as Shan State Special Area 4, Mongla area, Lesser Mongla area or Mong La Area, is a special region administrated by Peace and Solidarity Committee (PSC) of Shan State-East, and National Democratic Alliance Army. It covers territories of the entire Mong La Township, eastern part of Mong Hpayak Township and to the north borders the northern part of Wa State.

The indigenous peoples of this region are Blang, Pyin, Akha, Hani, Lahu and Tai Lue people, etc. while the lingua franca is Mandarin Chinese.

It was established by sent-down youth U Sai Leun (born Lin Mingxian). Since its active involvement into casinos and endangered wild-animal trafficking, it has been an issue for the Chinese government, which closed the Port of Daluo several times. It has its own police force. It also sent police cross border to destruct a casino there, under the acknowledgement of Burmese government. This special region is notorious in southwest Yunnan as they send casino advertisement spam SMS to Chinese cellphones. Organized crime used to be common in this region.

Sai Leun maintained a good relationship with Burmese army (Tatmadaw) as the Tatmadaw units benefit financially from it. As of 2026, the relations between the Sit-tat and the NDAA have increased, with the PSC campaigning for continued autonomy and collaboration with the central authorities, while also participating in the government-sponsored peace process.

== Status ==
Between 1989 and 2021 the Eastern Shan State Special Region 4 was one of many Special Regions of Myanmar, the status of the Eastern Shan State Special Region 4 at that time is disputed, while it is mostly seen as a non-autonomous special region, while some other sources refer to it as an autonomous special region. In 2011 the NDAA agreed with the government of Myanmar, that they don't will become Independent. In 2014, the Special Region was considered to be outside the control of the central government. In an article from 2021, it was seen as de facto independent. In 2022 Kyaw Tun, the Shan State Chief Minister Dr. Kyaw Tun attended ceremony of handing over citizenship scrutiny cards and household lists to the local residents in Special Region-4 in Shan State (East) under the Pan Khin Project, the same year, the NDAA had talks with the government of Myanmar, to recognize a "Mong La Autonomous Region". Since 2023 it's again referred by medias as a non-autonomous special region. As June 2026, the NDAA still seeks autonomy by the government of Myanmar for the Eastern Shan State Special Region 4.

== Name ==
Mongla, Mengla or Meungla are different Romanization of the same Tai word, both the e and the o here should be pronounced like the Scottish accent pronunciation of u in bucks. Thus, to differentiate Mengla County in China and Mong La Township/settlement in Myanmar the locals call the former Greater Mengla/Mongla while the latter Lesser Mongla/Mengla.

== Administrative divisions ==
- Mong La District (မိုင်းလားခရိုင် 勐拉县)
- Nam Pan District (နမ့်ပန်းခရိုင် 南板县)
- Hsee Lu District (ဆီလူးခရိုင် 色勒县)

== Citations ==
- 边城勐拉, 中缅交界处的法外之地 - New York Times
