= Sai Leun =

Burmese military officer (1948/1949–2024)

U Sai Leun
- စိုင်းလင်း
- Sai Leun in 2019

President of the Eastern Shan State Special Region 4
- In office 30 June 1989 – ?
- Deputy: U San Pae; Khun Hsang Lu; U Htein Lin (Lin Daode)
- Preceded by: Position established
- Succeeded by: U Htein Lin (Lin Daode)

Chairman of the Peace and Solidarity Committee
- In office 2005 – 7 August 2024
- Preceded by: Position established
- Succeeded by: U Htein Lin (Lin Daode)

Personal details
- Born: Lin Mingxian (林明贤); 26 December 1948 Pang Hseng, Shan State, Burma or Hainan, China
- Died: 7 August 2024 (aged 75) China
- Party: Peace and Solidarity Committee
- Other political affiliations: Communist Party of Burma (1968–1989); National Democratic Alliance Party (1989–2005)
- Spouse: Nang Yin
- Relations: Pheung Kya-shin (father-in-law)
- Children: at least one son (including U Htein Lin)
- Occupation: War lord, State leader

Military service
- Allegiance: People's Army (1968–1989); National Democratic Alliance Army (1989–2024)
- Years of service: 1968–2024
- Rank: Commander in chief of the NDAA

Sai Leun (Burmese: စိုင်းလင်း; Chinese: 吴再林; also known as Sai Lin; born Lin Mingxian; 26 December 1948 – 7 August 2024), commonly known as U Sai Leun, was the chairman of the National Democratic Alliance Army (NDAA) and the leader of the Eastern Shan State Special Region 4.

== Biography ==
Sai Leun's official biography states he was born in Pang Hseng, Shan State, Burma on 26 December 1948. His father was a Chinese from Hainan; his mother was of a native Tai. Other sources reported that he was born on the Chinese island of Hainan. During the Cultural Revolution in the 1960s, he moved through Yunnan into Burma and then joined to help strengthen the Communist Party of Burma (CPB). He has until now enjoyed considerable economic success in Mong La. He became a field commander in CPB zone 815, or present-day Mong La.

When the party disintegrated after the Wa rank-and-file revolted against its leadership in 1989, he headed one of the largest breakaway factions, the National Democratic Alliance Army. He was one of the several ex-CPB commanders to sign a ceasefire with the government in Rangoon, allowing his group to profit on the opium trade and then gambling as Special Region 4 became "opium free" in 1997.

To placate Sai Leun and guarantee he would not take up arms again, Burmese authorities granted him generous terms. Mong La became an autonomous zone and his well-equipped private army of several thousand men retained its arms. Additionally, he was given several business concessions: the tacit permission for the opium trade being the most lucrative. Khin Nyunt personally met with Sai Leun to ratify the agreement. Soon new refineries in his area went into operation. By the early-1990s Sai Leun was accused of heading one of the most powerful drug syndicates in northern Burma with an output of one to two thousand kilogrammes of pure heroin annually. For years he was high on the hitlist of the US State Department.

Sai Leun made a few abortive attempts to develop traditional business interests in the city. He invested some $US4 million in a sugar mill outside Mong La, only to find that no market existed for the sugar. A similar attempt to cultivate new varieties of rice also faltered when he failed to attract Chinese buyers. Sai Leun's construction business, Asia Wealth Company, has built a new sealed road that links Sop Lwe to the outside world.

Sai Leun was married to Nang Yin (Chinese: 彭新春), the eldest daughter of Pheung Kya-shin, the chairman of the Shan State Special Region 1 in Myanmar and leader of the Myanmar National Democratic Alliance Army (MNDAA).

On 7 August 2024, Sai Leun died in China after battling lung cancer. He was 75.

== See also ==
- National Democratic Alliance Army
- Eastern Shan State Special Region 4
