= Lycée Sisowath =

Public school in Phnom Penh, Cambodia

- វិទ្យាល័យព្រះស៊ីសុវត្ថិ
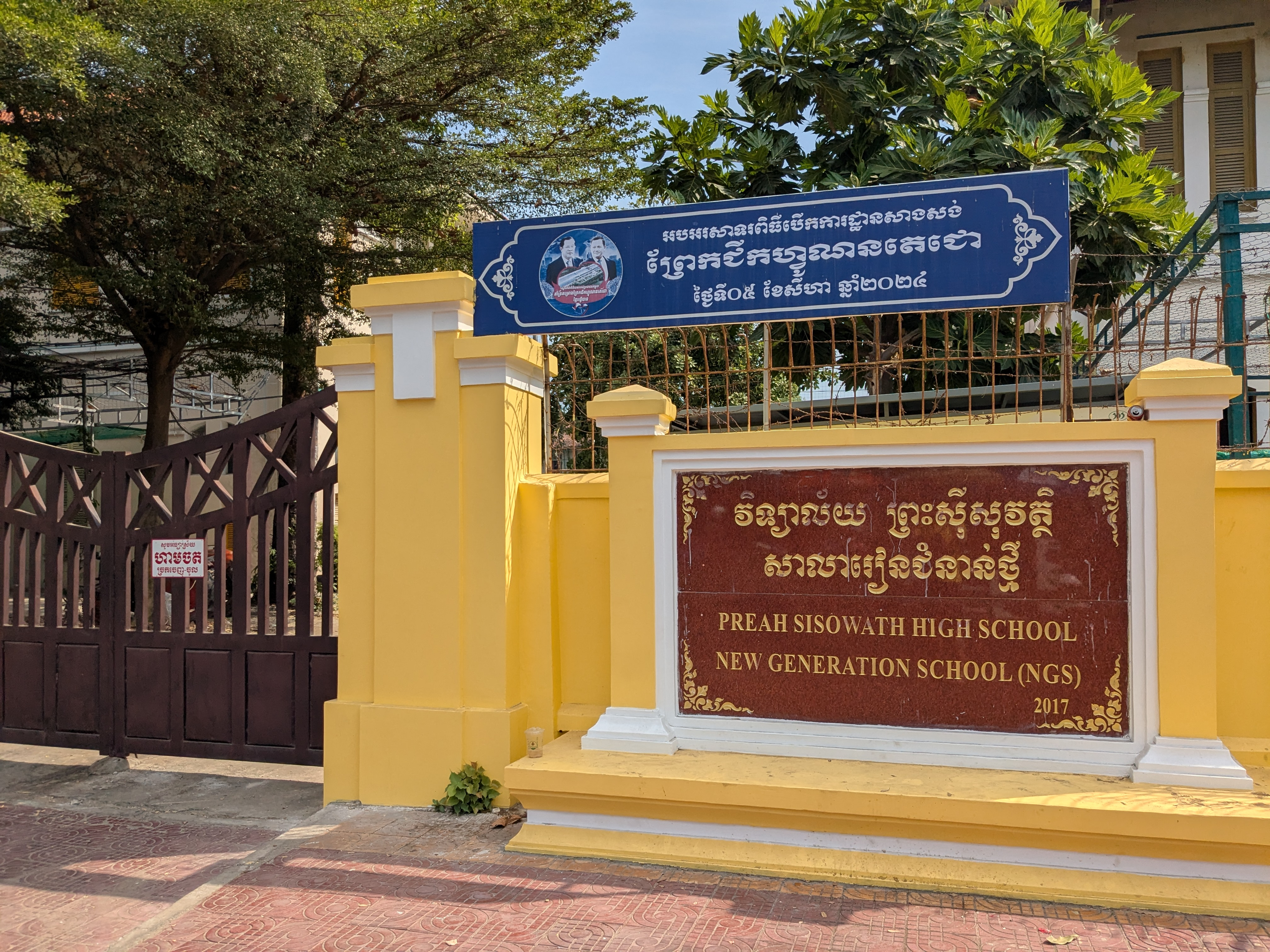

Location
- Pasteur St. (51) 12210; Phnom Penh; Cambodia; 11.56404°N 104.92492°E

Information
- School type: Public
- Established: 1873; 153 years ago
- Founder: Unknown
- Principal: Mul Suyheng (មូល ស៊ុយហេង)
- Teaching staff: 300+
- Campus size: 4 hectares (9.9 acres)

Lycée Sisowath (Khmer: វិទ្យាល័យព្រះស៊ីសុវត្ថិ; also Sisowath High School) is a secondary school in Phnom Penh, Cambodia. The school was founded in 1873 as a collège (middle school) and became a lycée (middle and high school) in 1933. It is named after King Sisowath.

== History ==
Under the initiative of François Fontaine, the first "modern" Franco-Cambodian school was established in the year 1873. It was the French-language School of the Protectorate, in Phnom Penh. The School of the Protectorate was renamed Collège of the Protectorate in 1893 and then Collège Sisowath in 1905. The Collège prepared students for service in the French colonial administration, the judiciary and the indigenous administration. During the French Protectorate, the school was heavily dominated by Vietnamese immigrant children.

In 1933, the Collège Sisowath became the Lycée Preah Sisowath. In 1935, Son Ngoc Thanh founded the Association des amis du Lycée Sisowath, Cambodia's first alumni association, which would become an agora of discussion and promotion of the national sentiment. The first Cambodian students graduated from the Lycée Sisowath with baccalauréats in 1939. In the 1940s, the headmaster of the school was Chhean Vam, the husband of Thiounn Choeum of the Thiounn family.

Only 144 Cambodians had completed the full baccalauréat by 1954. The Ministry of Education took measures to use the Khmer language at all education levels including Lycée Sisowath beginning in 1967.

During the Khmer Republic, the school was renamed twice: first to Lycée du 9 octobre in 1970, after the date of the declaration of the republic by the Lon Nol regime, then to Phnom Daun Penh High School in 1974. Under the Pol Pot regime, the high school was closed and used as an army warehouse. The teachers, staff, and students were forced to leave the city and live in undeveloped areas, where they greatly suffered from the killings perpetrated.

After the January 7, 1979, Vietnamese invasion, the government of the People's Republic of Kampuchea gradually reopened schools. The lycée was officially reopened on January 21, 1980, under the name of Phnom Daun Penh High School. School personnel requested the ministry of education to change the high school name to its original name of Lycée Preah Sisowath in 1993 to preserve this historic endowment.

In 1996, a Franco-Khmer section was reintroduced again at the Lycée Sisowath.

== Campus ==
Lycée Sisowath occupies a four-hectare (9.9-acre) lot bordering Norodom Boulevard donated by King Sisowath in 1905. The school has eight buildings and one administration center which retains its original French-influenced appearance. There is one football field, two volleyball fields and three basketball fields.

== Curriculum ==
There are three special classes (ថ្នាក់ពិសេស) are selected upon written tests: Khmer literature, mathematics and physics.

== Notable alumni ==
- Hou Youn
- Ieng Sary
- Ieng Thirith (born Khieu Thirith)
- Kaing Guek
- Khieu Samphan
- Khieu Ponnary
- Norodom Monineath Sihanouk
- Norodom Yuvaneath
- Pol Pot
- Sam Rainsy
- Nhiek Tioulong
- Văn Văn Của
- Nguyễn Thị Bình
