= National Democratic Alliance Army =

Burmese (Myanmar) paramilitary group

- မြန်မာအမျိုးသား ဒီမိုကရက်တစ် မဟာမိတ်တပ်မတော်
- Flag of the National Democratic Alliance Army
- Leaders: U Sai Leun; Sao Hsengla; San Pae
- Dates active: 1989–present
- Headquarters: Mong La
- Active regions: Eastern Shan State Special Region 4
- Ideology: Shan nationalism
- Size: 3,000–4,000
- Part of: Peace and Solidarity Committee (PSC)
- Website: http://www.4tzx.com/ https://www.facebook.com/monglanewscna1976

The National Democratic Alliance Army (NDAA) (Note: Also known as the National Democratic Alliance Army – Eastern Shan State (NDAA-ESS), Eastern Shan State Army and Mong La group. The name "Mong La group" originates from its headquarters in Eastern Shan State Special Region 4, colloquially known as Mong La area.) is an ethnic armed organization in eastern Shan State, Myanmar (Burma). It is the armed wing of the Peace and Solidarity Committee (PSC).

== History ==
The Mong La area had been under the control of several warlords since the 1960s. The NDAA was formed in 1989 after splitting from the former Communist Party of Burma (CPB). The strength of the army is 3,000 to 4,000 men.

The NDAA was one of the first groups to sign a ceasefire with the Tatmadaw (Myanmar Armed Forces). After the ceasefire, the area underwent an economic boom, and the NDAA had benefited financially from increased opium harvests and narcotics trafficking. The NDAA declared an opium ban in the Mong La region in 1997 and signed a new ceasefire with the Myanmar government in 2011.

The NDAA maintains close ties with other rebel armed groups that split from the CPB, such as the Myanmar Nationalities Democratic Alliance Army (MNDAA), the New Democratic Army - Kachin (NDA-K), and the United Wa State Army (UWSA). In 2008 the UWSA was strongly against giving away the area of Mong Pawk from its control because it serves as a link with its ally, the National Democratic Alliance Army in Mong La.

On 25 May 2025, representatives of the NDAA, including San Pae, met with the State Administration Council junta. The NDAA relegated to Min Aung Hlaing that no anti-junta armed groups operated in Mong La.

According to the Shan Human Rights Foundation, the NDAA controls 19 rare earth mines in Mong Yawng Township. The operation of these mines lead to water contamination in the Mekong River, affecting the health of both communities in Shan State and in neighboring Laos.
