= List of official social and NGO organisations in Myanmar =

This is an incomplete list of official social and NGO organisations in Myanmar. You can expand it.

- Auxiliary Fire Brigade
- Biodiversity and Nature Conservation Association (BANCA)
- Foreign Correspondents' Club of Myanmar
- Forest Resource Environment Development and Conservation Association
- Manaung Township Association (Yangon)
- Myanmar Auxiliary Fire Brigade
- Myanmar Christian Fellowship of the Blind
- Myanmar Clinical Psychology Consortium
- Myanmar Computer Federation
- Myanmar Computer Industry Association
- Myanmar Computer Professionals Association
- Myanmar Corn Farmers' Association (MCFA & EU)
- Myanmar Dental Association
- Myanmar Edile Oil Millers Association
- Myanmar Engineering Society
- Myanmar Floriculturists Association
- Myanmar Health Assistants Association
- Myanmar Heart Development Organization
- Myanmar Hiking and Mountaineering Association
- Myanmar Library Association
- Myanmar Maternal and Child Welfare Association
- Myanmar Medical Association
- Myanmar Motion Picture Asiayone
- Myanmar Motion Picture Organisation
- Myanmar Music Asiayone
- Myanmar Music Organisation
- Myanmar National Committee for Women's Affairs
- Myanmar Nurses Association
- Myanmar Overseas Seafarers Association
- Myanmar Pharmceutical Association (MPA)
- Myanmar Photographic Society
- Myanmar Printing and Publishing Association
- Myanmar Red Cross Society
- Myanmar Sports Writers Federation
- Myanmar Thabin Organisation
- Myanmar Theatrical Organisation
- Myanmar Traditional Artist and Artisans Organisation
- Myanmar Veterans' Organisation
- Myanmar War Veteran Organisation
- Myanmar Women's Affairs Federation
- Myanmar Women's Development Association
- Myanmar Women's Entrepreneurs Association
- Myanmar Writers and Journalists Association
- Myanmar Writers and Journalists Organisation
- The Central Committee for Drug Abuse Control
- Union of Myanmar Federation of Chambers of Commerce and Industry
- Union Solidarity and Development Association
- Myanmar Environmental Legal Services (MELS)
- Capacity Building Initiative (CBI)

== External links to social and NGO organisations ==
- Union Solidarity and Development Association
- Myanmar Women's Affairs Federation
- The Central Committee for Drug Abuse Control
- Myanmar Computer Federation
- Myanmar Computer Professionals Association
- Myanmar Computer Industry Association
- Myanmar Overseas Seafarers Association
- Union of Myanmar Federation of Chambers of Commerce and Industry
- The Myanmar Maternal and Child Welfare Association
