= List of social and non-governmental organisations in Myanmar =

Myanmar, also known as Burma, has many organisations and societies set up by the government. Although they are loosely termed NGOs, they are partly under the supervision and receive funding from the government. The Myanmar Red Cross, for example, does carry out red cross related duties, but is also considered as a potential reserve force in times of conflict, while the War Veterans' Organisation is a quasi-political society.

The following is a list of social and non-governmental organisations in Myanmar:

- Foreign Correspondents' Club of Myanmar
- Myanmar Dental Association
- Myanmar Maternal and Child Welfare Association
- Myanmar Medical Association
- Myanmar Motion Picture Organisation
- Myanmar Positive Group
- Myanmar Red Cross Society
- Myanmar Veterans' Organisation
- Myanmar Women's Affairs Federation
- Myanmar Writers and Journalists Association
- Association for Aid and Relief
- Union of Myanmar Federation of Chambers of Commerce and Industry
- Union Solidarity and Development Association
- World Vision for HIV and AIDS project in Myanmar
