= Gumlau =

Gumlau, also spelt Gumlao, is a Kachin and Jinghpaw concept that can be used to describe a social system where the political entity is a village or confederation of villages that has been described as emphasizing democracy, egalitarianism, and anarchism, In contemporary Jinghpaw it does not refer to a social system, but can carry the meaning of rebellion.

== System ==
E. R. Leach in the book Political Systems of Highland Burma described the gumlau system and contrasted it with the gumsa system. Leach's "ideal model" of a gumlau system noted that gumlau villages tended to cluster in a confederation with no village being superior, and that there was no heredity class system with the associated customary tributes from villagers to chiefs. Leach also wrote that Mayu-Dama was not essential to gumlau and that where it was, differences in rank were minimised by keeping the bride price low or by forming circles. However, Maran La Maw notes that although Leach claimed that gumlau societies formed marriage circles within the mayu-dama system to minimize class relations, he did not find evidence of this in the areas Leach described, but did find that marriage circles were also a part of gumsa societies.

In gumlau societies, justice was delivered by a council of elders which were not necessarily heredity. The Gumlau system acted as a mechanism against states as its ideology rejected chiefs or even killed those who tried to claim dominant positions. During the British colonial period, gumlau villages, often termed "republics" by the colonials made navigating Kachinland difficult and the area difficult to govern, hence the British aimed to suppress gumlau rebellions or systems. While Gumlau is not today used as a word to mean social system, many of the ideals described by Leach and others can be found in gumrawng gumtsa or zaw gumsa system.

== History ==
The origins of gumlau are described in Kawlu Ma Nawng's 1942 book The History of the Kachins of the Hukawng Valley which describes origin stories occurring 300–400 years before its publication. In one of the accounts, Dumsa La Lawn makes an offering to a sky spirit called Sinlap who shows him a bird's eye view of gumlau and gumsa villages, explaining that in gumlau villages all men were equal and unlike gumsa villages, men did not have to make customary offerings of animal thighs to chiefs. Upon his return, the Dumsa and the village chief start a conflict that escalates to the point where the Dumsa kills the chief, sparking a gumlau rebellion. A second origin story describes the "Blacksmith-Priest" rebellion started by the N'Dup Dumsa lineage who rebelled against their treatment from their relatives who saw them as lower status due to the circumstances of their birth. In 1820s Assam, J.B. Neufville used the term not to describe a system but individual men who were living in their Mayu's house. In the 1860s, violent Gumlau rebellions occurred in Kachinland, emanating from the Triangle region.

== Causes ==
Leach believed that the Gumlau and the Gumsa systems formed an oscillatory model and that Gumsa polities would eventually become gumlao and vice versa. However this model has been criticized as being overly theoretical and not taking into account historical events. Friedman saw political and economic situations such as debt resulting from Bride price payments or increasingly low returns on farming yields as being factors contributing to gumlau upheavals.
