= Burma Center Prague =

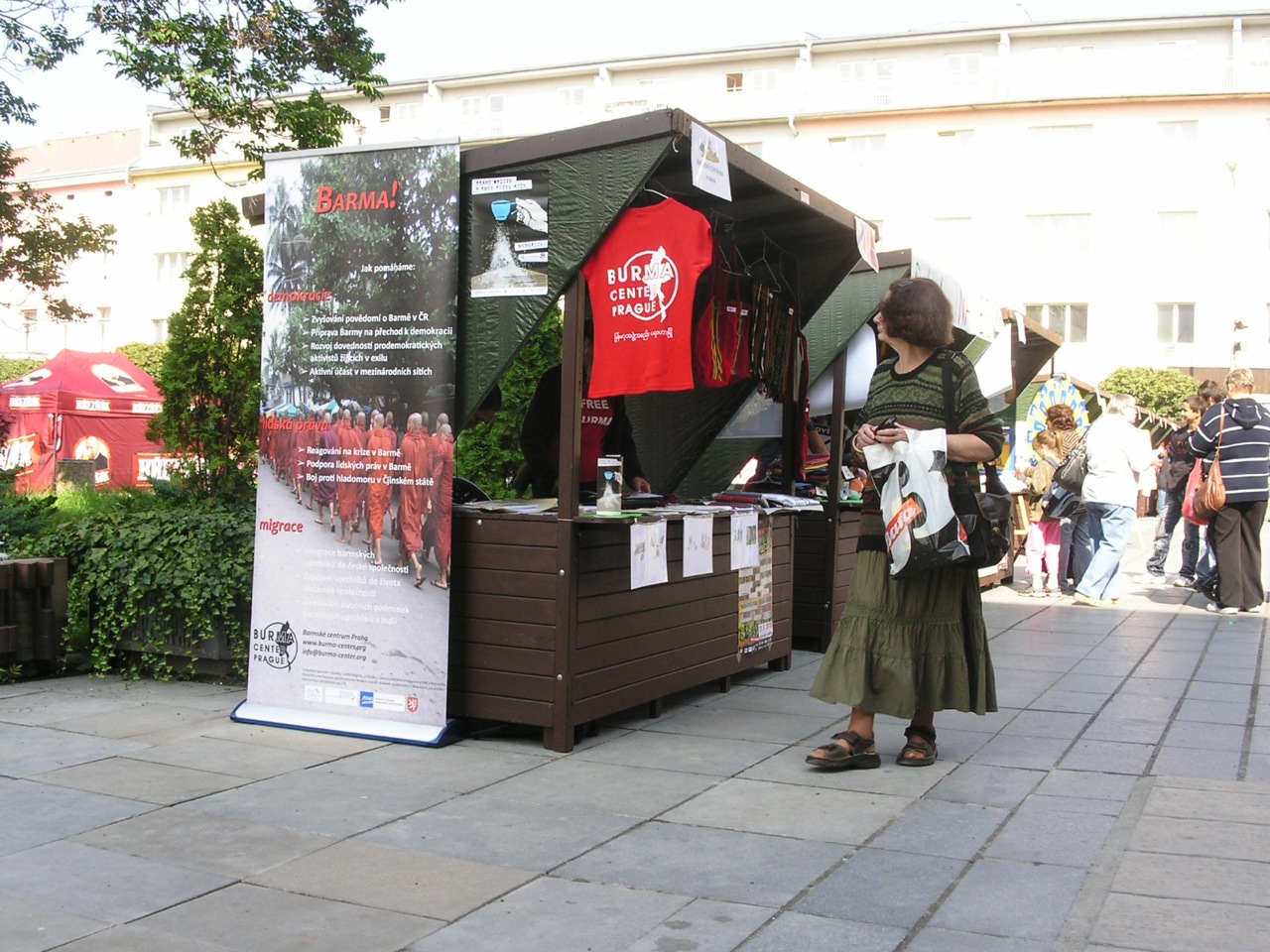
Stall of Burma Center Prague on a festival in the Czech Republic.

Burma Center Prague (BCP) is a non-profit non-governmental organization (NGO) based in Prague, Czech Republic. It has been founded by two individuals in 2006. Its main goal is to achieve human rights, civil rights and democracy in Burma.

It does this

- by analyzing the situation in Burma and by informing and involving the European public;
- by serving as a bridge between Europe and Burma;
- by providing needed services for Burmese, in particular capacity building and facilitating the integration of refugees; and
- by supporting the empowerment and active participation of Burmese for the transition of Burma.

The organization is working both in the Czech Republic and implementing global projects.

== Activities ==
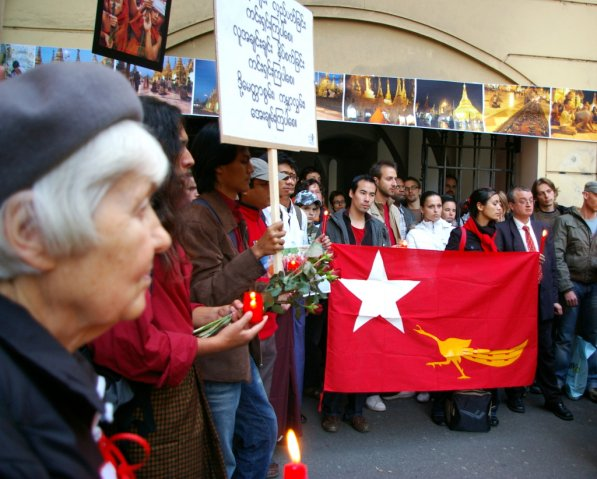
Protest organized by Burma Center Prague to support the Saffron Revolution at the memorial of the Velvet Revolution in Prague.

Main activities comprise:

- Providing services to refugees from Burma who came to the Czech Republic, especially to those who came within the UNHCR resettlement program.
- Supporting grassroots organizations of Burmese refugees in India through capacity building, micro finance and other activities.
- Responding to the famine in Chin State.
- Supporting Burmese exile media and Burmese bloggers.
- Promoting responsible tourism to Burma.
- Providing expertise and reports on issues related to Burma.
- Campaigning for the release of Burma's political prisoners.
- Organizing conferences of the Burmese exile democracy movement and related advocacy organizations.
- Supporting civil society organizations in Burma through capacity building, a microgrant scheme and the development of an open source platform for social networking.

== Celebrity support ==
Activities by Burma Center Prague have repeatedly been supported by the former Czechoslovak and Czech president Václav Havel.

In 2013, the organization has arranged meetings of the Burmese community in the Czech Republic and supporters with Aung San Suu Kyi and Min Ko Naing who attended events in Prague.

== Cooperations ==
In 2012, Burma Center Prague started cooperation with the Wathann Film Fest, which annually takes place in Yangon.
