= Myitkyina Manau =

Dance festival in Myitkyina, Myanmar

Myitkyina Manau မနော ပွဲတော်
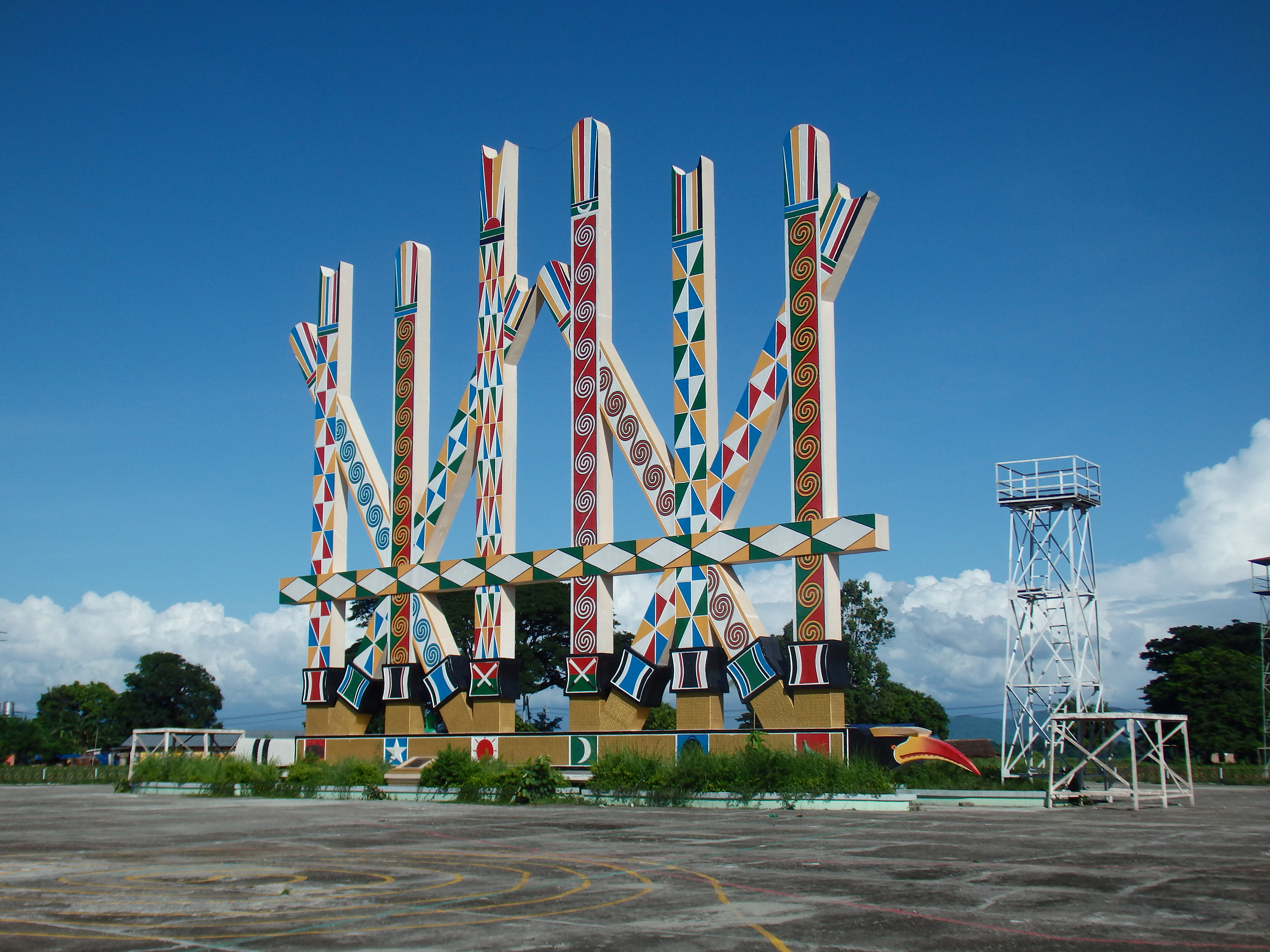
- Manau Shadung at Myitkyina Park
- Observed by: Kachin State, Myanmar

The Myitkyina Manau is a Manaw which takes place semi-annually in Myitkyina, Kachin State, Myanmar, and is one of the largest Manau in the world. It is an event of importance for the Kachin community of Myitkyina and is currently held at the Kachin National Manau park, Shatapru, which has permanent shadung pillars installed in the centre.

== History ==
=== 20th century ===
In 1927, British Empire colonials held a manau in Myitkyina to announce slave release in the Triangle region. A manau was held in 1947 by Kachins to celebrate the end of Japanese occupation. Following independence, the Burmese government helped provide finances for the Myitkyina Manau annually on Kachin State Day up until 1958. During the years of war between the Tatmadaw and the Kachin Independence Army the manau was held erratically, often in government headquarters on Union Day rather than on Kachin State Day.

=== 21st century ===
From 26 December 2001 to 2 January 2002, there was the inauguration of Manau Ground in Shatapru, in which 300,000 people participated, including representatives from State Peace and Development Council, Tatmadaw, Kachin Independence Organization (KIO), Kachin Culture and Literary committees and the Manau organizing committee. This manau festival was a Hkumran Manau which was started and funded locally. In 2010, ahead of the 2011 festival, the Burmese military government took control of the Manau organising committee and under their management, KIO representatives were banned from attending. As the KIO had been a major sponsor of the event, their non attendance was a contributing factor in the decision to reduce the number of days from 8 to 5. The move caused anger among local people, who felt it was an inappropriate for the Burmese military to lead the manau.

==== 2012-2014 ====
After the ceasefire between the Tatmadaw and Kachin Independence Army broke down, the Myitkyina Manau was not held.

==== 2015 ====
In August 2014, the Kachin State Government announced plans to bring back the Manau festival to Myitkyina. Following the announcement, many Kachins, including the previous organisers, The Kachin Culture and Literature Committee, boycotted the festival feeling it was inappropriate to celebrate, as there were still many Kachin refugees displaced by fighting. The Maina IDPs camp committee in Waimaw township also did not attend and a member of the camp committee was quoted as saying, “Without specific meaning the Manau dance festival should not be held. It only means oppressing us as we (IDPS) are suffering now". A petition against the Manau was signed by 10,000 and delivered to the Kachin State minister, and local civil society groups delivered leaflets to tourists which described how they felt the festival was exploiting Kachin culture for political gain. The Manau was visited by Thein Sein on 10 January 2015, who wore Kachin dress.
