= Ohn Thwin =

Burmese military officer and diplomat

- အုန်းသွင်

Ambassador of Myanmar

Personal details
- Born: 1950 Myanmar (Burma)
- Died: 24 September 2022 (aged 71–72) Hlaing Township, Yangon, Myanmar (formerly Burma)
- Children: 2, including Ye Tayza
- Education: Defence Services Academy
- Profession: Military officer, diplomat

Military service
- Allegiance: Myanmar
- Branch/service: Myanmar Army
- Years of service: 1968–2022
- Rank: Brigadier General
- Battles/wars: Myanmar conflict; 2021 Myanmar coup d'état; Myanmar civil war (2021–present)

Ohn Thwin (Burmese: အုန်းသွင်; pronounced [ʔóʊɰ̃ θwɪ̀ɰ̃]; 1950 — 24 September 2022) was a Burmese army general and diplomat. He held the rank of brigadier general in the Myanmar Army and later served as ambassador to Sri Lanka, Bangladesh, the Maldives, and South Africa. A senior member of the Myanmar War Veterans Organization, he was regarded as a mentor to Vice-Senior General Soe Win, the deputy commander-in-chief of the Myanmar armed forces.

He was assassinated in Yangon, Hlaing Township, Myanmar, in 2022 by anti-regime resistance fighters, becoming the highest-ranking former junta-linked figure killed since the 2021 military coup.

== Early life and education ==
Ohn Thwin was born around 1950 in Burma (now Myanmar). He joined the Defence Services Academy (DSA), the country’s elite military training institution, and graduated as part of its 15th intake. His cohort was among the early batches of DSA graduates who would later form the backbone of Myanmar’s military leadership in the 1980s and 1990s. Details about his family background and early upbringing remain limited in public records.

== Military and diplomatic career ==
After graduating from Defence Services Academy, Ohn Thwin pursued a professional military career and rose through the ranks of the Myanmar Army, attaining the rank of Brigadier General before his retirement. During his military tenure, he served in various command and administrative roles, though specific postings have not been publicly detailed.

Following his retirement from active service, he was appointed as Myanmar’s ambassador to several countries. His diplomatic assignments included postings to Sri Lanka, Bangladesh, the Maldives, and South Africa. His ambassadorial work marked a transition into a civilian representation role during a period when many retired senior officers were deployed to diplomatic missions abroad.

== Political views and public statements ==
Throughout his post-retirement years, Ohn Thwin maintained a vocal and public alignment with Myanmar’s military establishment. He openly criticized the National League for Democracy (NLD) and its leader, Aung San Suu Kyi, particularly after the party’s electoral victories and during their governance.

Following the February 2021 military coup, Ohn Thwin became more publicly supportive of the State Administration Council. On his personal Facebook account, he expressed approval of military actions against pro-democracy protesters, including violent crackdowns that drew international condemnation. His social media activity included posts celebrating the junta’s moves against resistance forces and denouncing anti-coup demonstrators.

He was also an active and senior member of the Myanmar War Veterans Organization, which retained close ties with the military and was reported to be a source of auxiliary manpower for the regime in its conflict against resistance groups. His continuing influence within pro-junta networks and status as a high-profile military retiree made him a symbolic figure among regime supporters.

== Assassination ==
On 24 September 2022, Ohn Thwin was shot and killed at his residence in Hlaing Township, Yangon. He was 72 years old. His son-in-law, Ye Tayza, a former army captain, was also killed during the incident. The attack was carried out by the Inya Urban Force and another unnamed guerrilla group, which claimed responsibility as part of their campaign targeting figures linked to the military regime.

His funeral was held on 26 September at a military cemetery in Yangon. Though the family did not publish a formal obituary, regime Information Minister Maung Maung Ohn publicly offered condolences in the state-run press. In October, the military council announced the arrest of ten individuals allegedly involved in the assassination. The junta condemned the killing as a “deliberate targeting” of retired officers.

== Aftermath and reaction ==
The assassination reverberated within Myanmar’s retired officer community, particularly in Yangon, where many high-ranking former generals reside. Following the killing, several prominent figures reportedly began relocating to Naypyidaw, the capital, citing security concerns. Government ministers and junta-affiliated officials also increased security at their residences.

The killing of Ohn Thwin followed similar targeting of regime-affiliated individuals, including the 2021 assassination of Thein Aung, a former naval officer and CFO of Mytel. Both cases were widely interpreted as reflecting growing insecurity among military-linked civilians and retirees amid escalating urban resistance.

Security concerns among veterans intensified after the killing. Some retired officers reportedly called for permission to legally possess firearms, while others criticized the lack of protective measures for ex-personnel, especially as the regime sought to mobilize retired officers during ongoing conflicts.
