= Sahpye =

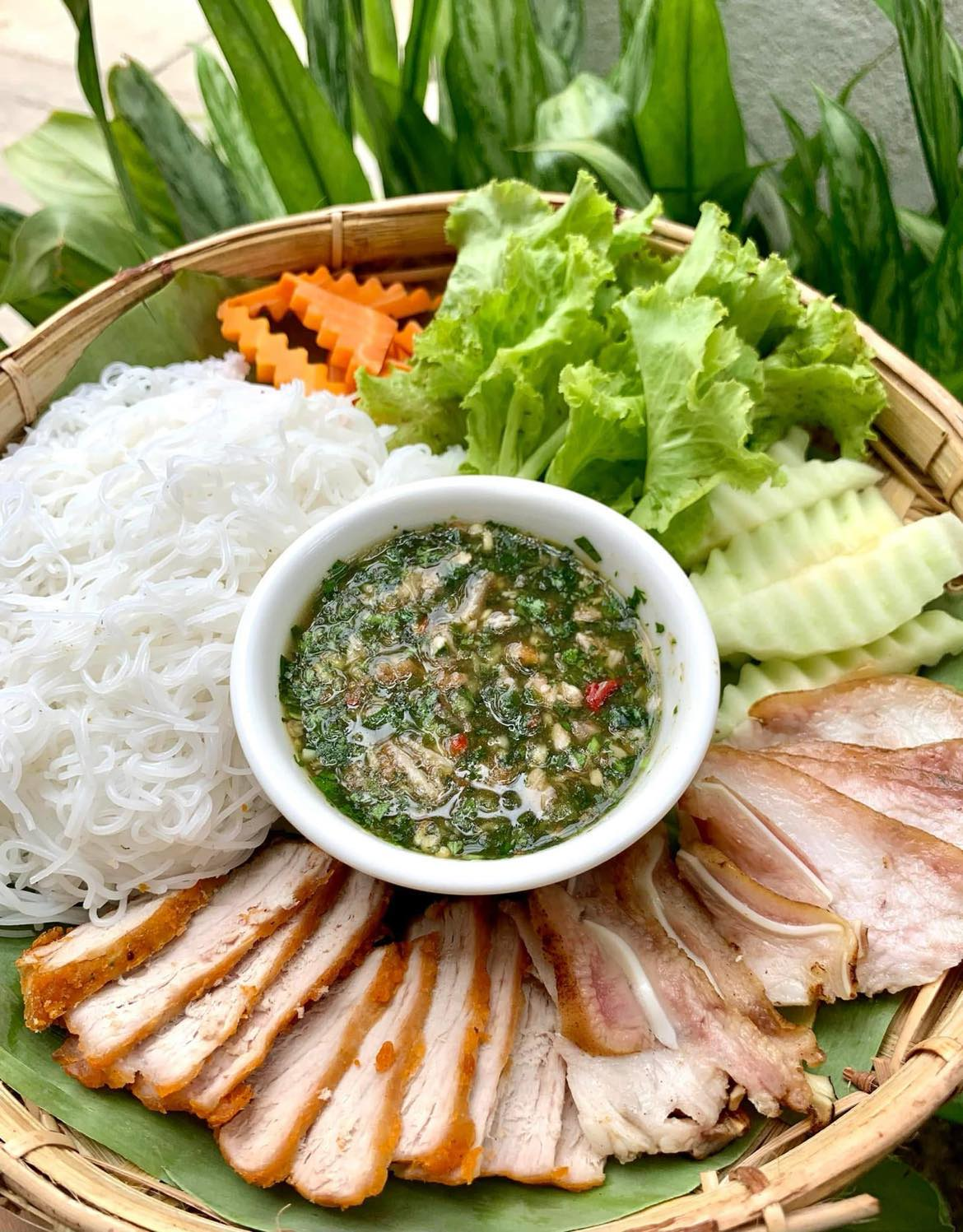
Sahpye

Sahpye (Burmese: ဆာဖြယ်) is considered as a traditional dish originating from the Shan people of Myanmar. It is widely consumed in Shan State and Kachin State, where it is sometimes regarded as part of Kachin cuisine. The dish is commonly served in Kachin restaurants and is recognized for its distinctive preparation, reflecting the culinary traditions of the region. Sahpye consists primarily of rice vermicelli served with beef or pork, accompanied by a savory sauce. Its preparation and ingredients vary slightly by region but remain closely tied to Shan culinary customs.

== Ingredients ==
- Beef or pork or chicken
- Rice vermicelli
- Lemon or tamarind
- Chili
- Salt
- Sugar
- Culantro
- Asian chives (Cyuu Sai)
- Vietnamese coriander( Phat Phae)
- Pennywort
- Cucumber
- Lettuce
- Carrot
- Garlic
- Fish sauce

== Origins ==
Sahpye is believed to derive from the Shan terms "Sarh Phye" or "Sarh Hone", with possible roots in the culinary traditions of the Shan-Chinese and Kachin communities from China’s Yunnan region. While some sources suggest a Yunnanese origin, the dish is most prominently recognized as a staple of Kachin cuisine, particularly in Kachin State where it is widely consumed.

== Taste ==
Sahpye's defining feature is its sour and bitter sauce, which eliminates the need for oil in preparation. Traditionally, the sauce carries a mild spiciness, offering a refreshing yet pungent flavor that may induce sweating due to its heat. The dish is commonly accompanied by fresh vegetables such as cucumber, lettuce, and carrot, which temper its spiciness.

== Regional variations ==
In Kachin State, Sahpye is traditionally served with a spicy sour sauce containing minced pork or beef, reflecting the region's preference for bold, piquant flavors characteristic of Kachin cuisine.

In contrast, Shan State's version typically features a bitter sauce and is often served with generous portions of meat atop the rice vermicelli.

While regional adaptations exist to accommodate local tastes, the dish's signature sauce remains fundamentally similar across different preparations. The consistent use of sour and bitter flavor profiles maintains Sahpye's distinctive identity throughout its variations.

== Nutrition and health considerations ==
Sahpye provides a balanced nutritional profile, combining lean protein from its meat components (typically beef or pork) with dietary fiber and micronutrients from fresh vegetable accompaniments like cucumber, lettuce, and carrots. The dish's preparation without oil contributes to its relatively low fat content compared to other regional noodle dishes. The traditional herbs and spices used in Sahpye's signature sauce may offer phytochemical benefits, though scientific studies specifically on this dish are limited. However, the sauce's notable spiciness - derived from local chili varieties and other pungent ingredients - may cause gastrointestinal discomfort in individuals with sensitivity to spicy foods or certain digestive conditions.

== Gallery ==
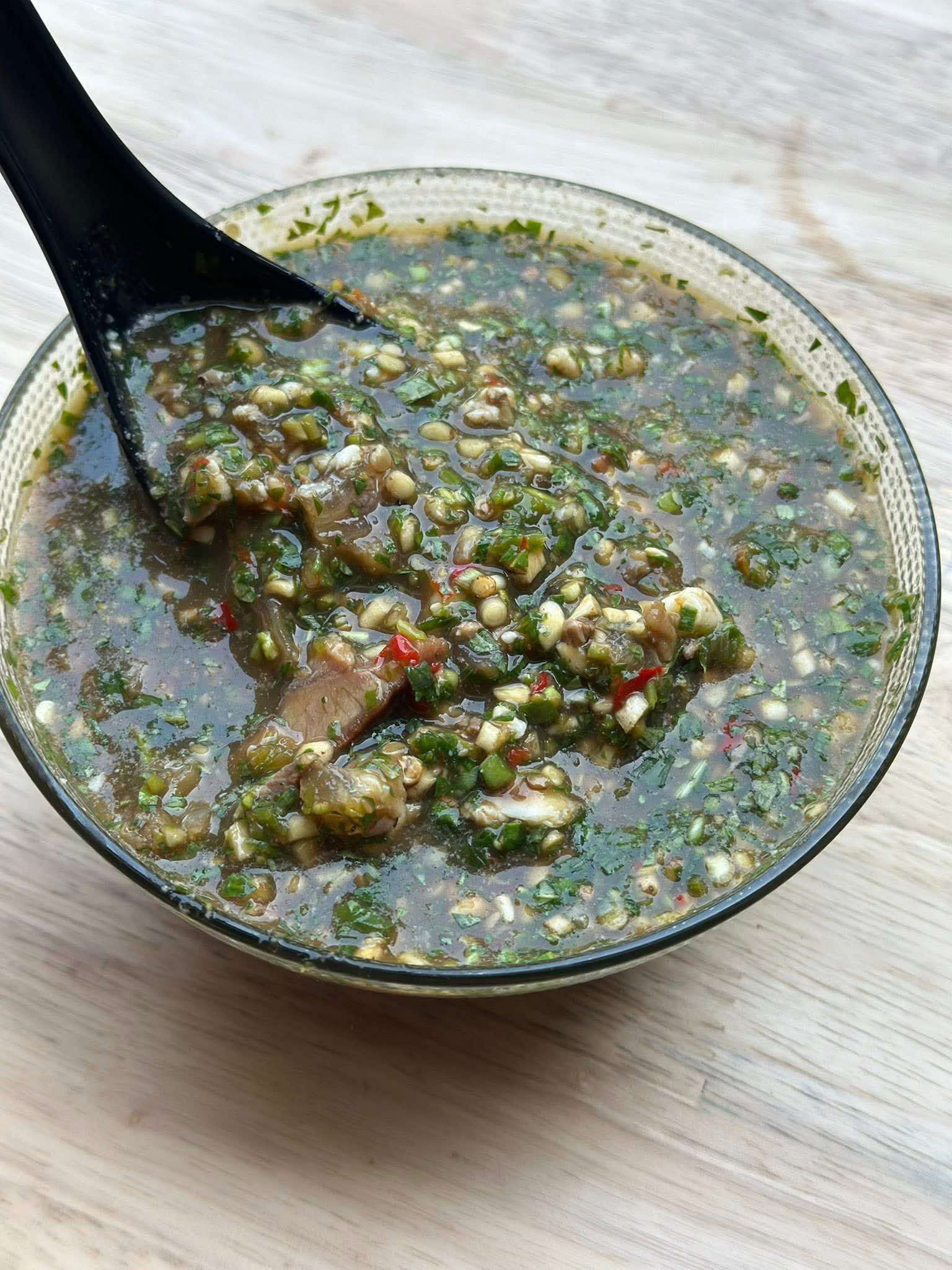
Main element in Sahpye (Sauce)

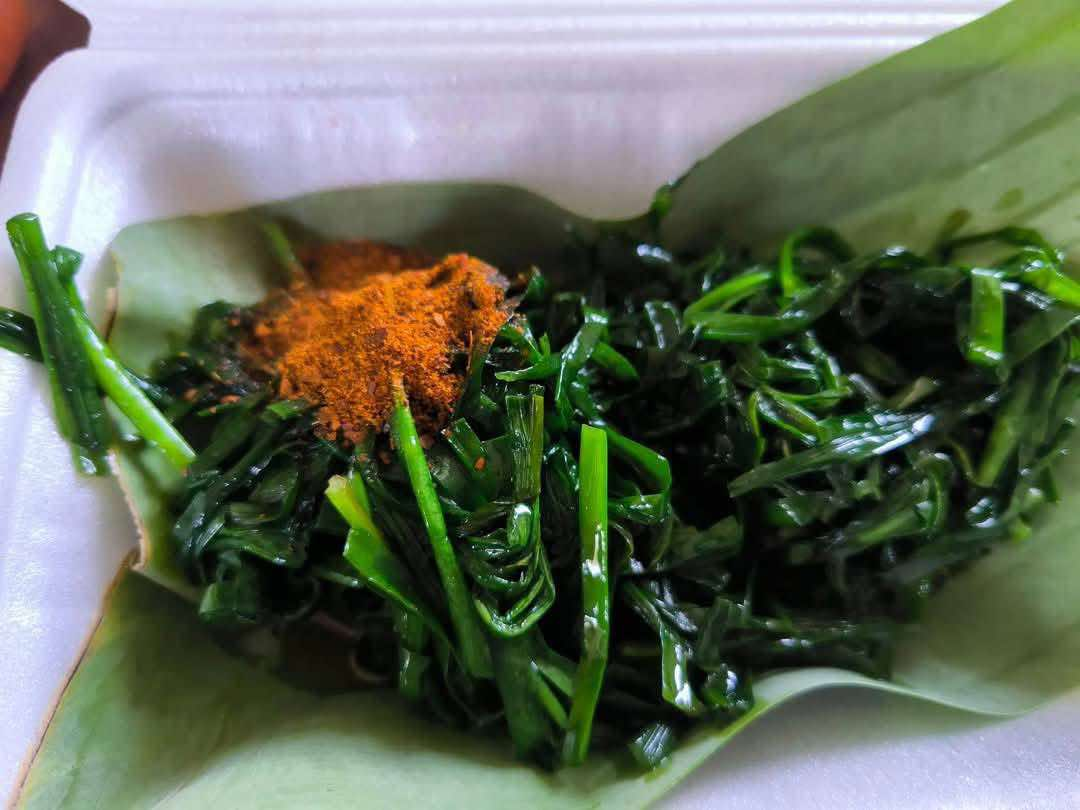
Grilled asian chives which usually served together with Sahpye

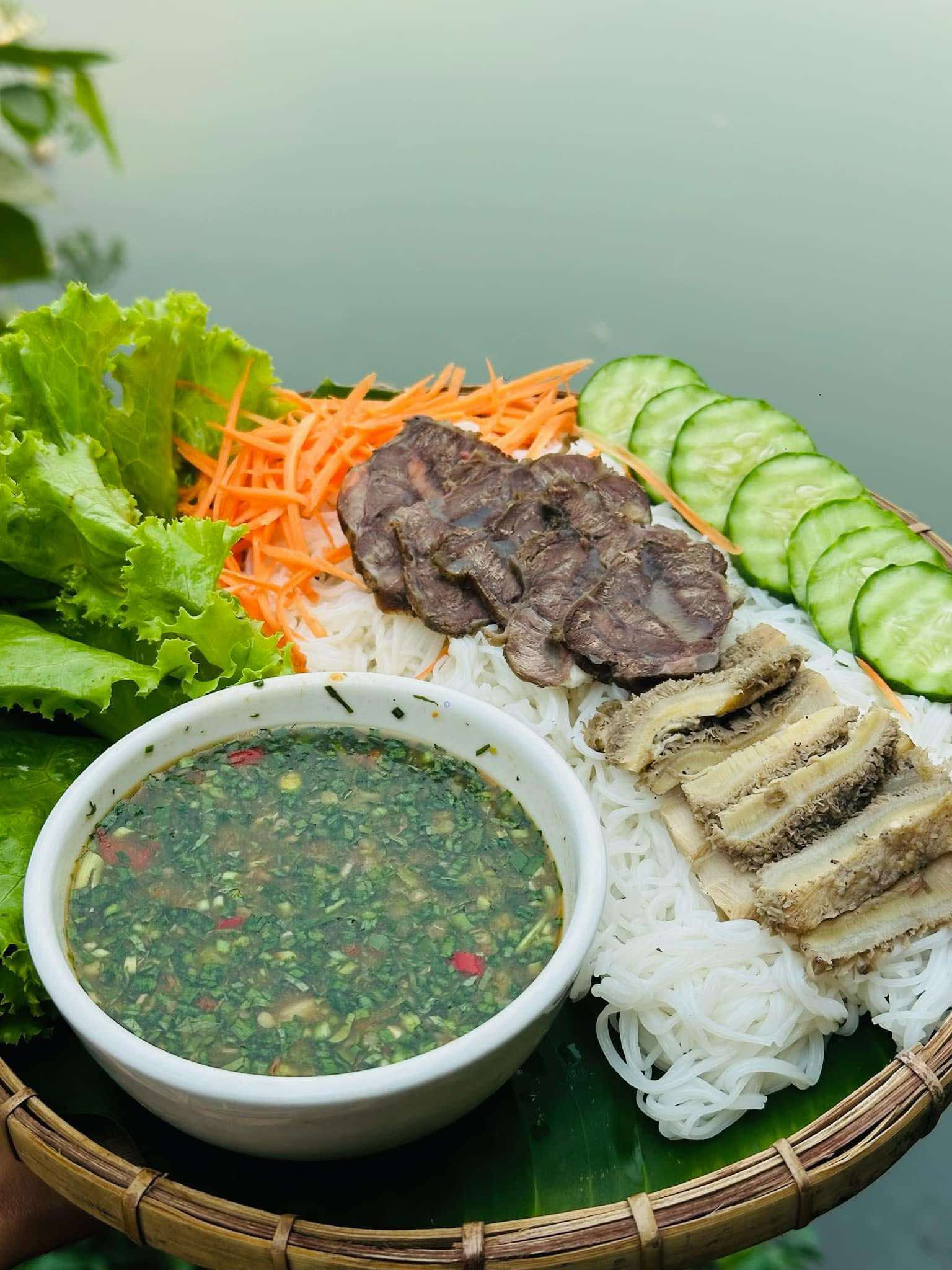
Sahpye

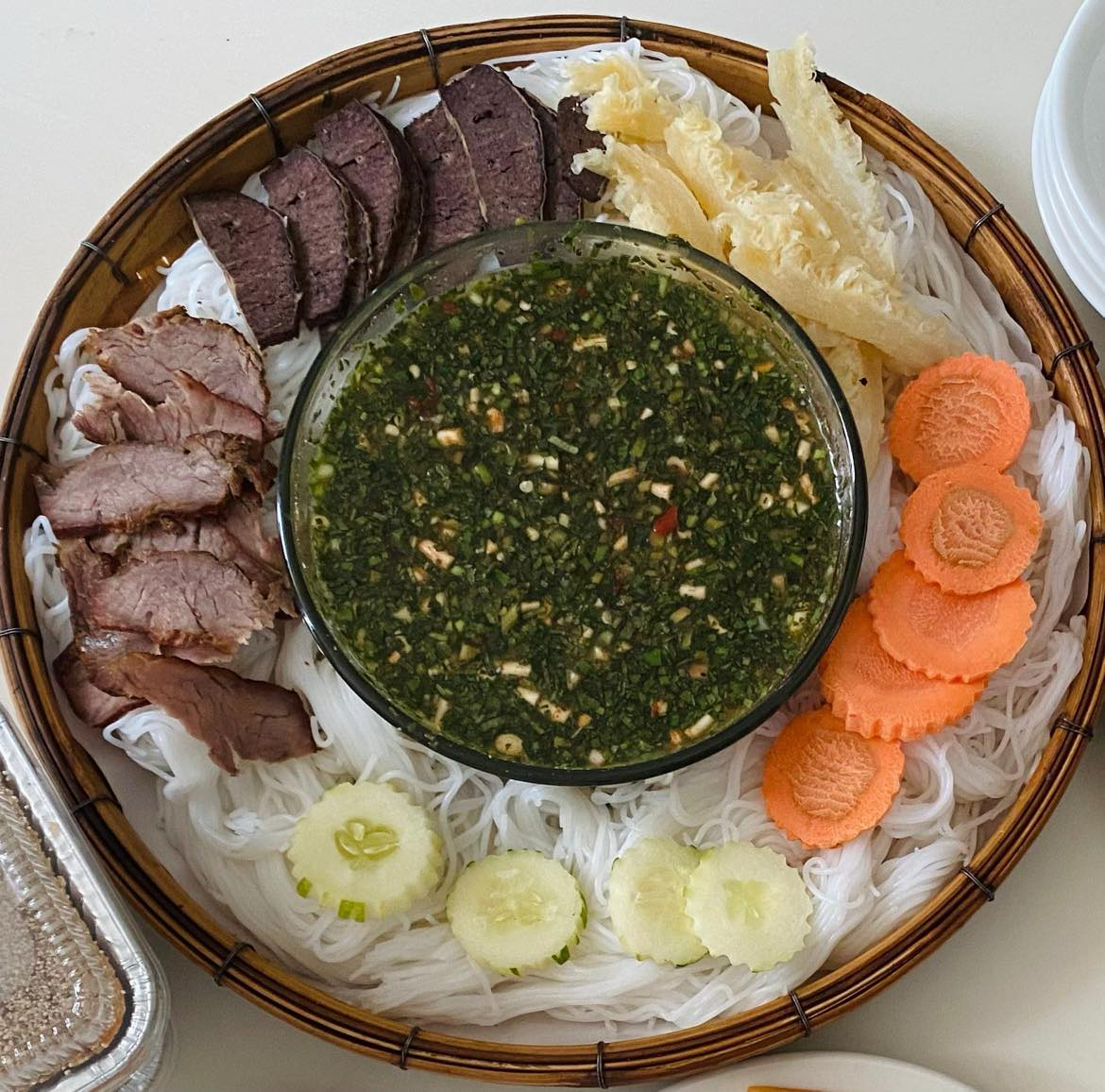
Sahpye
