= Rhotic consonant =

Class of consonants

In phonetics, rhotic consonants, or "R-like" sounds, are liquid consonants that are traditionally represented orthographically by symbols derived from the Greek letter ⟨Ρ ρ⟩, including ⟨R r⟩ in the Latin script and ⟨Р p⟩ in the Cyrillic script. They are transcribed in the International Phonetic Alphabet by variants of Roman ⟨R r⟩: ⟨r, ɽ, ɾ, ɹ, ɻ, ɺ, 𝼈, ʀ, ʁ⟩. Transcriptions for vocalic or semivocalic realisations of underlying rhotics include ⟨ɜː, ə̯, ɐ̯⟩, and, for retroflex vowels, ⟨ɚ⟩ and ⟨ɝ⟩.

This class of sounds is difficult to characterise phonetically; from a phonetic standpoint, there is no single articulatory correlate (manner or place) common to rhotic consonants. Rhotics have instead been found to carry out similar phonological functions or to have certain similar phonological features across different languages.

Being "R-like" is an elusive and ambiguous concept phonetically and the same sounds that function as rhotics in some systems may pattern with fricatives, semivowels, or even stops. For example, the alveolar tap is a rhotic consonant in multiple languages, but in North American English, the alveolar tap is an allophone of the stop phoneme /t/, as in water. It is likely that rhotics are not a phonetically natural class but a phonological class.

Some languages have rhotic and non-rhotic varieties, which differ in the incidence of rhotic consonants. In non-rhotic accents of English, /ɹ/ is not pronounced unless it is followed directly by a vowel.

== Types ==
The most typical rhotic sounds found in the world's languages are the following:

- Trill (popularly known as rolled r): The airstream is interrupted several times as one of the organs of speech (usually the tip of the tongue or the uvula) vibrates, closing and opening the air passage. If a trill is made with the tip of the tongue against the upper gum, it is called an apical (tongue-tip) alveolar trill; the IPA symbol for this sound is [r]. Most non-alveolar trills, such as the bilabial one, however, are not considered rhotic.
  - Many languages, such as Bulgarian, Swedish (except the Scanian dialect which has a uvular pronunciation), Norwegian, Frisian, Italian, Spanish, Russian, Polish, Ukrainian, Dutch and most Occitan variants, use trilled rhotics. In the English-speaking world, the stereotyped Scottish rolled [r] is well known. The "stage pronunciation" of German specifies the alveolar trill for clarity. Rare kinds of trills include Czech ⟨ř⟩ [r̝] (fricative trill) and Welsh ⟨rh⟩ [r̥] (voiceless trill).
  - The uvular trill is another kind of rhotic trill; see below for more.
- Tap or flap (these terms describe very similar articulations): Similar to a trill, but involving just one brief interruption of airflow. In a number of languages flaps are used as reduced variants of trills, especially in fast speech. However, in Spanish, for example, flaps and trills contrast, as in pero /ˈpeɾo/ ("but") versus perro /ˈpero/ ("dog"). Also flaps are used as basic rhotics in Japanese and Korean languages. In Australian English and most American dialects of English, taps do not function as rhotics but are realizations of intervocalic apical stops (/t/ and /d/, as in butter and cider). The IPA symbol for these sounds is [ɾ] (or substandard [ᴅ] for the tap, contrasted with the flap [ɾ]).
- Alveolar or retroflex approximant (as in most accents of English—with minute differences): To produce one of these rhotic approximants, the front part of the tongue approaches the upper gum, or the tongue-tip is curled back towards the roof of the mouth ("retroflexion"). No or little friction can be heard, and there is no momentary closure of the vocal tract. The IPA symbol for the alveolar approximant is [ɹ] and the symbol for the retroflex approximant is [ɻ]. There is a distinction between an unrounded retroflex approximant and a rounded variety that probably could have been found in Anglo-Saxon and even to this day in some dialects of English, where the orthographic key is r for the unrounded version and usually wr for the rounded version (these dialects will make a differentiation between right and write).
- Uvular (popularly called guttural r): The back of the tongue approaches the soft palate or the uvula. The standard Rs in European Portuguese, French, German, Danish, and Modern Hebrew are variants of this rhotic. If fricative, the sound is often impressionistically described as harsh or grating. This includes the voiced uvular fricative, voiceless uvular fricative, and uvular trill. In northern England, there were accents that once employed a uvular R, which was called the "Northumbrian burr".
- developmental non-rhotic Rs: Many non-rhotic British speakers have a labialization to [ʋ] of their Rs, which is between idiosyncratic and dialectal (southern and southwestern England), and since it includes some RP speakers, somewhat prestigious. Apart from English, in all Brazilian Portuguese dialects the ⟨rr⟩ phoneme, or /ʁ/, may be actually realized as other, traditionally non-rhotic, fricatives (and most often is so), unless it occurs single between vowels, being so realized as a dental, alveolar, postalveolar or retroflex flap. In the syllable coda, it varies individually as a fricative, a flap or an approximant, though fricatives are ubiquitous in the Northern and Northeastern regions and all states of Southeastern Brazil but São Paulo and surrounding areas. The total inventory of /ʁ/ allophones is rather large: [r ɻ̝̊ ɻ̝ ɽ ç ʝ x ɣ χ ʁ~ʀ ħ ʕ h ɦ], the latter eight being particularly common, while none of them except archaic [r] contrast with the flap in all positions, and may occur alone in a given dialect. Few dialects, such as sulista and fluminense, give preference to voiced allophones; elsewhere, they are common only as coda, before voiced consonants. Additionally, some other languages and variants, such as Haitian Creole and Timorese Portuguese, use velar and glottal fricatives instead of traditional rhotics, too. In Vietnamese, depending on dialect, the rhotic can occur as [z], [ʐ] or [ɹ]. In modern Mandarin Chinese, the phoneme /ɻ~ʐ/, which is represented as ⟨r⟩ in Hanyu Pinyin, resembles the rhotics in other languages in realization, thus it can be considered a rhotic consonant.

Furthermore, there is also a non-syllabic open vowel [ɐ̯] (conventional transcription, the exact quality varies) that patterns as /r/ in some Germanic languages such as German, Danish and Luxembourgish. It occurs only in the syllable coda.

== Characteristics ==
In broad transcription rhotics are usually symbolised as /r/ unless there are two or more types of rhotic in the same language; for example, most Australian Aboriginal languages, which contrast approximant [ɻ] and trill [r], use the symbols r and rr respectively. The IPA has a full set of different symbols which can be used whenever more phonetic precision is required: an r rotated 180° [ɹ] for the alveolar approximant, a small capital R [ʀ] for the uvular trill, and a flipped small capital R [ʁ] for the voiced uvular fricative or approximant.

The fact that the sounds conventionally classified as "rhotics" vary greatly in both place and manner in terms of articulation, and also in their acoustic characteristics, has led several linguists to investigate what, if anything, they have in common that justifies grouping them together. One suggestion that has been made is that each member of the class of rhotics shares certain properties with other members of the class, but not necessarily the same properties with all; in this case, rhotics have a "family resemblance" with each other rather than a strict set of shared properties. Another suggestion is that rhotics are defined by their behaviour on the sonority hierarchy, namely, that a rhotic is any sound that patterns as being more sonorous than a lateral consonant but less sonorous than a vowel. The potential for variation within the class of rhotics makes them a popular area for research in sociolinguistics.

== In languages ==
=== English ===
English has rhotic and non-rhotic accents. Rhotic speakers pronounce a historical /r/ in all instances, while non-rhotic speakers only pronounce /r/ at the beginning of a syllable.

=== Dutch ===
Colloquial Northern Dutch speech of the Randstad region is variably rhotic. In the syllable coda, the sequences /ɛr, ɑr, aːr, ɔr, oːr/ may be realized as [ɛ̝j, ɑj, aːj, ö̞j, öːj], which may be close to or the same as the vowels or sequences /eː, ɑj, aːj, ɔj, oːj/, resulting in a variable merger. For instance, kerk 'church' and cake 'pound cake' may become homophonous as [kɛ̝jk], whereas maar 'but' can be homophonous with maai '(I) mow' as [maːj]. /ɔr/ and /oːr/ are usually somewhat distinct from /ɔj/ and /oːj/ as the former feature vowels that are more central (and /oːj/ features a diphthong [əuj] in certain dialects, such as Rotterdam Dutch).

After /ə/, /r/ may be dropped altogether, as in kilometer [ˈkilömeitə] 'kilometer'. This is commonly heard in The Hague. It is not necessarily restricted to the word-final position, as it can also happen in word-final clusters in words such as honderd [ˈɦɔndət] 'hundred'.

After /i/, /y/, /u/, /eː/ and /øː/, /r/ may be realized as a centering glide, as in mier [mïːə̯] 'ant', muur [mÿːə̯] 'wall', moer [müːə̯] 'queen bee', meer [mɪːə̯] 'lake' and deur [dʏːə̯] 'door'. As with /ɔ/ and /oː/, these vowels are more central (and also longer) than in other contexts. Furthermore, both /eː/ and /øː/ are raised in this context, so that meer becomes a near-homophone of mier, whereas deur becomes a quasi-rhyme of muur.

In citation forms, /r/ in the syllable coda is pronounced as a pharyngealized pre-velar bunched approximant [ɰ̟ˤ] (known in Dutch as the Gooise r) that is acoustically similar to [ɻ]: [kɛ̝ɰ̟ˤk, ˈkilömeitəɰ̟ˤ, mïə̯ɰ̟ˤ] etc. Other realizations (alveolar taps and voiced uvular fricatives) are also possible, depending on the region and individual speaker, so that mier may be also pronounced [mïə̯ɾ] or [mïə̯ʁ]. The pre-velar bunched approximant as well as the palatal approximant realization of /r/ described above are virtually unknown in southern varieties of Dutch. In the varieties where they do occur, they are restricted to the syllable coda. In other environments, /r/ is realized as [ɾ] or [ʁ].

=== Other Germanic languages ===
In most varieties of German (with the notable exception of Swiss Standard German), /r/ in the syllable coda is frequently realized as a vowel or a semivowel, [ɐ] or [ɐ̯]. In the traditional standard pronunciation, this happens only in the unstressed ending -er and after long vowels: for example besser [ˈbɛsɐ], sehr [zeːɐ̯]. In common speech the vocalization is usual after short vowels as well, and additional contractions may occur: for example Dorn [dɔɐ̯n] ~ [dɔːn], hart [haɐ̯t] ~ [haːt]. Commonplace mergers include that of /ar/ with /aː/ (leading to homophony of e.g. warten, waten) and loss of length distinctions before coda /r/ (e.g. homophony of Herr, Heer). Compare German phonology.

Similarly, Danish /r/ after a vowel is, unless followed by a stressed vowel, either pronounced [ɐ̯] (mor "mother" [moɐ̯], næring "nourishment" [ˈneːɐ̯e̝ŋ]) or merged with the preceding vowel while usually influencing its vowel quality (/a(ː)r/ and /ɔːr/ or /ɔr/ are realised as long vowels [ɑː] and [ɒː], and /ər/, /rə/ and /rər/ are all pronounced [ɐ]) (løber "runner" [ˈløːpɐ], Søren Kierkegaard (personal name) [ˌsœːɐn ˈkʰiɐ̯kəˌkɒˀ]).

=== Astur-Leonese ===
In Asturian, word-final /r/ is always lost in infinitives before an enclitic pronoun, which is reflected in writing. For example, the infinitive form dar [dar] plus the third-person plural dative pronoun "-yos" da-yos [ˈdaʝos] ("give to them") or the accusative form "los" dalos [ˈdalos] ("give them"). That happens also in Leonese in which the infinitive form is "dare" [ˈdare], and both the /r/ and the vowel are dropped (da-yos, not *dáre-yos). However, most speakers also drop rhotics in the infinitive before a lateral consonant of a different word, but that is not shown in writing: dar los dos [daː los ðos] (give the two [things]). That does not occur in the middle of words: the name Carlos [ˈkarlos].

=== Catalan ===
In some Catalan dialects, word-final /r/ is lost in coda position not only in suffixes of nouns and adjectives denoting the masculine singular and plural (written as -r, -rs; as well as in words like llavors [ʎəˈβɔs] "then; so"), but also in the "-ar, -er and -ir" suffixes of infinitives: forner [furˈne] "(male) baker", forners [furˈnes], fer [ˈfe] "to do", lluir [ʎuˈi] "to shine, to look good". However, rhotics are "recovered" when followed by the feminine suffix -a [ə], and when infinitives have single or multiple enclitic pronouns (notice the two rhotics are neutralized in the coda, with a flap [ɾ] occurring between vowels, and a trill [r] elsewhere); e.g. fornera [furˈneɾə] "(female) baker", fer-lo [ˈferɫu] "to do it (masc.)", fer-ho [ˈfeɾu] "to do it/that/so", lluir-se [ʎuˈir.sə] "to excel, to show off".

=== French ===
Final ⟨r⟩ is generally not pronounced in words ending in ⟨-er⟩. The R in parce que ("because") is not pronounced in informal speech.

=== Malay (including Indonesian) ===
The pronunciation of final /r/ in Malay and Indonesian varies considerably. In Indonesian, Baku (lit. 'standard') Malay, and Kedah Malay, the final /r/ is pronounced, but in the Johor-Riau accent, the standard accent of Malay in Brunei and Malaysia, and several other dialects, it is not.

The quality of the realization of the phoneme varies too. In the syllable onset, in Indonesian, Baku Malay, and standard Johor-Riau Malay, it varies between a trill [r], a flap [ɾ], and sometimes, even an approximant [ɹ̠]. In a number of dialects of Malay, such as those of Kedah, Kelantan-Pattani and Terengganu, onset /r/ is usually realized as a velar fricative [ɣ]. In Perak Malay, a uvular pronunciation, [ʁ] is more common.

In Kedah Malay, final /r/ is uniquely realized as a pharyngeal fricative [ʕ]. In the dialect of Malacca, when it appears after /a/, final /r/ is vocalized into [w] or [u].

=== Portuguese ===
In some dialects of Brazilian Portuguese, /ʁ/ is unpronounced or aspirated. That occurs most frequently with verbs in the infinitive, which is always indicated by a word-final /ʁ/. In some states, however, it happens mostly with any /ʁ/ when preceding a consonant. The "Carioca" accent (from the city of Rio de Janeiro) is notable for this. The Caipira dialect (from São Paulo countryside) usually realizes /ʁ/ as [ɻ], [χ], or [r̪̊].

=== Spanish ===
Among the Spanish dialects, there may be an unpronounced word-final /r/ in Andalusian Spanish, Caribbean Spanish (descended from and still very similar to Andalusian and Canarian Spanish), Castúo (the Spanish dialect of Extremadura), Northern Colombian Spanish (in cities like Cartagena, Montería, San Andrés and Santa Marta, but not Barranquilla, which is mostly rhotic) and the Argentine dialect spoken in the Tucumán province. This mirrors the situation in some dialects of Brazilian Portuguese. The change occurs especially in infinitives. In Antillean Caribbean forms, word-final [r] in infinitives and non-infinitives is often in free variation with word-final [l], which may be delateralized to [j], forming a rising diphthong with the preceding vowel (as in dar [daj] 'to give').

=== Thai ===
The native Thai rhotic is the alveolar trill. The English approximants /ɹ/ and /l/ are used interchangeably in Thai. That is, Thai-speakers generally replace an English-derived r (ร) with an l (ล), and when they hear an l (ล), they may write an r (ร).

=== Turkish ===
In Istanbul Turkish, /r/ is always pronounced except in colloquial speech for the present continuous tense suffix yor as in gidiyor ('going') or yazıyordum ('I was writing') and bir ('one') when used as an adjective/quantifier (but not other numbers containing this word, such as on bir ('eleven')). In these cases, the preceding vowel is not lengthened. The unfavorability of dropping /r/ can be explained with minimal pairs, such as çaldı ('stole') versus çaldır (imperative 'ring').

In some parts of Turkey, like Kastamonu, the syllable-final /r/ is almost never pronounced: gidiya instead of gidiyor ("she/he is going") and gide instead of gider ("she/he goes"). In gide, the preceding e is lengthened and pronounced somewhat between e and a.

=== Chinese ===
Northern Chinese accents, centered around Beijing, are well known as having erhua which can be translated as "R-change". This normally happens at ends of words, particularly ones that end in an -n/-ng sound. So a southern Chinese might say yī diǎn (一点) ("a little bit") but a Beijinger would say it more like [(j)i tʲɚ] which in Pinyin is sometimes rendered yī diǎnr to show if the word can be rhotacized. The final "R" sound is strongly pronounced, not unlike Irish or American accents.

=== Uyghur ===
Among the Turkic languages, Uyghur displays more or less the same feature, as syllable-final /r/ is dropped, and the preceding vowel is lengthened: Uyghurlar [ʔʊɪˈʁʊːlaː] 'Uyghurs'. The /r/ may, however, sometimes be pronounced in unusually "careful" or "pedantic" speech; in such cases, it is often mistakenly inserted after long vowels even when there is no phonemic /r/.

=== Yaqui ===
Similarly in Yaqui, an indigenous language of northern Mexico, intervocalic or syllable-final /r/ is often dropped with lengthening of the previous vowel: pariseo becomes [paːˈseo], sewaro becomes [sewajo].

=== Lacid ===
Lacid, whose exonyms in various literature include Lashi, Lachik, Lechi, and Leqi, is a Tibeto-Burman language spoken by the Lacid people. There are various reports of their population from 30,000 to 60,000 people. Most are in Myanmar, but there are also small groups in China and Thailand. Noftz (2017) reports finding an example of a rhotic alveolar fricative in Lacid while he was doing phonological research at Payap University, in Thailand, in 2015. He was not able to continue his research and expressed the need for further examination of the segment to verify his results. It is postulated that the segment is a remnant of the rhotic fricative in Proto-Tibeto-Burman.

=== Berber languages ===
Syllable-final /r/ is lost in multiple varieties of Rif Berber and is lengthened before /a/ to [aː], and /i/ and /u/ become diphthongs like in English or German. However, a distinct phoneme /ɾ/ from earlier /l/ exists and does not undergo the same development.

== See also ==
- Rhotic and non-rhotic accents
- R-coloured vowel
- Guttural R

== Sources ==
- Barbosa, Plínio A.; Albano, Eleonora C. (2004), "Brazilian Portuguese" (PDF), Journal of the International Phonetic Association, 34 (2): 227–232, doi:10.1017/S0025100304001756
- Collins, Beverley; Mees, Inger M. (2003) [First published 1981], The Phonetics of English and Dutch (5th ed.), Leiden: Brill Publishers, ISBN 9004103406
