= Imawbum National Park =

National Park in Myanmar

- Emawbum National Park; Burmese: အီမောဘွန်းအမျိုးသားဥယျာဉ်
- IUCN category II (national park)
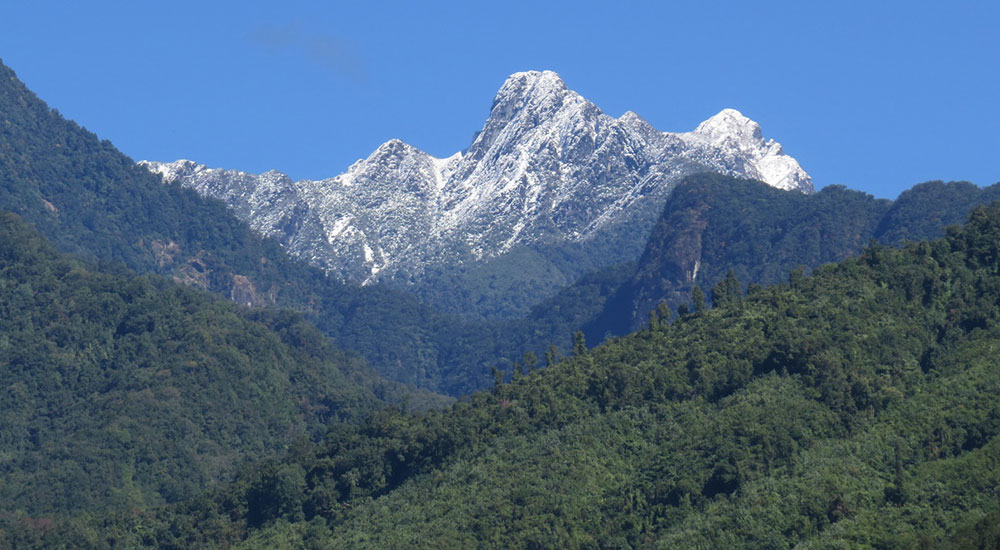
- Imawbum Mountain

- Location within Myanmar
- Location: Hsawlaw and Chipwi Township, Kachin State, Myanmar
- Nearest city: Tsawlaw
- Coordinates: 26°17′12″N 98°32′43″E
- Area: 233 mi^{2} (600 km^{2})
- Designation: National Park
- Created: 2020
- Designated: 2020
- Administrator: Forest Department

Imawbum National Park (Burmese: အီမောဘွန်းအမျိုးသားဥယျာဉ်), also known as Emawbum National Park, is a national park in northern Myanmar. The park was designated in 2020, and covers an area of 149,103 acres (603.40 km^{2}). It is located in eastern Kachin State, and on the east it adjoins the border with China.

The Nujiang Langcang Gorge alpine conifer and mixed forests ecoregion covers the eastern portion of the park, and the Northern Triangle subtropical forests covers the western portion.

== History ==
In 2010, biologists found the Myanmar snub-nosed monkey, a critically endangered species in the Imawbum mountains, kicking off a process to preserve the area for its conservation. The snub-nosed monkey became a flagship species for the park.

Imawbum was the first Myanmar national park to be established through a comprehensive consultation process of the indigenous Lhaovo, Lisu, Achang and Lachik people living in the area. The population within the now national park was fewer than 400 relying on farming and hunting in the remote mountain communities. A total area of 386,176 acres (1,562.80 km^{2}) was proposed initially from the perspective of conservation. The lands used by the people there are excluded from the National Park and community-based livelihood programs were launched in 2012 as part of the formal process.

== Fauna ==
The species that drove the creation of Imawbum National Park, the Myanmar snub-nosed monkey (Rhinopithecus strykeri), is critically endangered with only 260-330 individuals in the area. Their high-elevation forest habitat was threatened by encroachment from logging, which prompted the creation of a conservation area to protect their dwindling habitat. The park was designated in 2020 by the Myanmar Forest department with technical input from Fauna and Flora International (FFI) and the Rainforest Trust.

The endangered red panda (Ailurus fulgens) has been observed in dwarf bamboo–pine forest within the park. Other threatened species identified during surveys in the 2010s include the Asiatic black bear, takin and Blyth's tragopan. The park is also home to black musk deer, sun bears and clouded leopards.The park is a shelter for vulnerable animals, especially in an area with issues surrounding illegal wild animal trade.

There are 126 bird species in the National Park.
