= Biodiversity and Nature Conservation Association =

- Founded: 2004
- Type: Society charity
- Purpose: Conservation, Biodiversity, Sustainable development
- Location: Yangon, Burma
- Region served: Burma
- Method: Research; Environmental protection Environmental education
- Chairman: U Saw Tun Khaing
- Website: banca-env.org

Biodiversity and Nature Conservation Association (BANCA) is a Burmese non-governmental organisation established in the capital city Yangon. The society aims to conserve natural diversity and promote awareness. It remains the leading force in Burma for biodiversity conservation and sustainable development.

U Uga is the founder and the first chairperson of BANCA. He is one of the foresters in Myanmar.

== Mission and objectives ==
BANCA attempts to create opportunities for humans to live in harmony with nature, and to restore and maintain a healthy planet. The basic goals include conservation of nature, primarily biological diversity (genes, species, ecosystems) through actions based on surveys and research, partnership, network building, environmental education and public awareness, encouragement of stakeholder concept and improvement of rural livelihoods. To achieve the goals, BANCA recruits members from various research fields including ornithologists, primatologists, botanists, marine biologists, herpetologists, medical doctors, and academicians.

== Collaborations ==
BANCA has a long-term collaboration with international organisations such as BirdLife International, Ecoswiss, People Resources and Conservation Foundation and Fauna & Flora International; and also with major local organisations including Marine Science Association Myanmar (MSAM) and Rakhine Coastal Region Conservation Association (RCA). It has been in close partnership with the Department for Environment, Food and Rural Affairs (Defra) of UK, with which it has completed 3 conservation projects, and 1 on-going (2012–2015).

=== Myanmar Environmental Project ===
Biodiversity and Nature Conservation Association (BANCA) is a non-profit, non-political, non-religious and an environmental NGO in Myanmar. Although BANCA was officially recognized by the Ministry of Home Affairs, Union of Myanmar on 18 June 2004, BANCA has been active since 2002. BANCA's registered charity number is 1883. BANCA strongly believes that conservation programs can be accomplished successfully only if it is backed up with community development. BANCA has 9 Board of Directors and 11 Executive Committee members. The latter is headed by a chairperson. The backbone of BANCA is its competent ornithologists along with botanists, foresters, zoologists, social scientists, mammalogists, geologists, environmental scientists, marine biologists and herpetologists among others. Since its establishment in 2004, BANCA has been in close collaboration with international organizations like BirdLife International Indo-China Program, BirdLife International Asia Program (BLI), Royal Society for the Protection of Birds, UK (RSPB), Care Myanmar, Instuito Oikos (Italy), Flora and Fauna International (FFI), Arcona Cambridge, BBC Wildlife Funds, Darwin Initiative, Wildfowl Wetland Trust (WWT), World Wildlife Funds (WWF), Tropical Rainforest Foundation (TRP), Green Lotus, United Nations Development Program (UNDP) and People Resource and Conservation Foundation (PRCF). BANCA also worked with Government Ministries like the Ministry of Environmental Conservation and Forestry (MOECAF), Ministry of Livestock, Fisheries and Rural Development (MLFRD), Myanmar. BANCA is also looking forward to seeing more close collaboration with other international scientific organizations and local environmental NGOs

=== Bird conservation ===
BANCA has been in partnership with the BirdLife International in implementing the project called "Building Constituencies for Site Based Conservation in Myanmar", which aims at identifying networks of important bird areas in the Eastern Himalayas Endemic Bird Area and the Sundaic Lowlands Secondary Area. In addition the project aims to promote community-based approaches to the conservation of selected sites.

BANCA is one of the leading conservation organization for the conservation of several threatened bird species such as Gurney's pitta Hydrornis gurneyi, Spoon-billed sandpiper Calidris pygmaea, Baer's pochard Aythya baeri, Vulture and Helmeted hornbill Rhinoplax vigil in Myanmar collaboration with local communities.

BANCA supported Myanmar Forest Department for the designation of the Gulf of Mottama Ramsar site (161,030 ha) in 2017 and The Nantha Island and Mayyu Estuaries Ramsar site (3,608 hectares) in 2020.

== Achievements ==
=== Publications ===
In 2004 BANCA published an ornithology monograph Birds of Myanmar written by Kyaw Nyunt Lwin and Khin Ma Ma Thwin.

=== Environmental impact assessment ===
In 2009 BANCA carried out biodiversity impact assessments for Htamanthi hydropower and multipurpose dam project and Myitsone hydropower project.

=== Discovery of new monkey species ===
The unusual snub-nosed monkey found in the Maw River area of northeastern Kachin state in northern Burma was studied in 2010 by a research team led by Swiss primatologist Thomas Geissman and Ngwe Lwin of BANCA. The monkey was identified in 2010 as a new species Rhinopithecus strykeri. The monkey is a critically threatened species. It is known in local dialects of Lisu people as mey nwoah and Law Waw people as myuk na tok te, both of which mean "monkey with an upturned face". It is for this special facial structure that it is known to sneeze when it rains, which earns it a more popular epithet "the sneezing monkey". The discovery was heralded as one of the Top 10 New Species 2012 by the International Institute for Species Exploration. In 2012 it was also listed at no 9 of the Top 10 weirdest new species by the Chinese news portal, China.org.cn. The team leader Ngwe Lwin and chairman Tony Htin Hla were also involved in the establishment of the phylogenetic relationship of the new monkey with other Asian monkeys.
