= PRCF =

PRCF may refer to:

- People Resources and Conservation Foundation, a non-governmental conservation organization
- Pôle de Renaissance Communiste en France, a political movement inspired by Marxism–Leninism
- Power Rangers Cosmic Fury, a TV series
