= Mayu-Dama =

Mayu-Dama is a Kachin social system relating to kinship affinity with social rules governing who individuals can marry based on the relationships between the families. Mayu (wife givers) is the name used by families of the husband to describe the family of the wife. Dama (wife takers) is the word used to describe the family of the husband by the family of the wife. Families are both Mayu and Dama in their relationships to other families. Kahpu-Kanau refers to a relationship between the same clan and thus a prohibition on marriage. Maran La Raw asserts that kinship relations are one of the foundations of Kachin ethnic identity and that when any two Kachin meets they should be able to establish their relationship according to Mayu-Dama, while E.R. Leach asserted that the Mayu-Dama system was the "crucial distinguishing principle of Modern Kachin social structure".

== Hpuja ==
Hpuja or hpaji hpaga (Zaiwa: pau je) is the bridewealth given from Dama to Mayu. It can include "cattle, money, gongs, liquor, purchased cloth, clothing, coats, blankets, and jewellery." Gongs in particular, are one of the highest status exchange gifts in Kachin society

== Sharung Shagau ==
(Zaiwa: Shirung Je) Dowry items can include "two wife-givers’ baskets containing ritual grain seeds, ritual knife and spear, and hand-woven skirt" as well as guns and ceremonial knives. Tripods and woks may also be given, which in Zaiwa language are defined as "House-Entering Wealth".

== Female agency ==
While the Mayu-Dauma system seems centred around the possession of women, it has been noted that Jinghpaw women, in multi-family negotiations may "...represent themselves in these kinship negotiations as still being part of the Mayu lineage, an agency that gave them some flexibility in economic interactions as opposed to men who were more constrained by kinship relations and obligations.

== Kahpu Kanau ==
The Kahpu Kanau relationship, according to Sadan, "lubricates the system of social interactions between kin groups" enabling kahpu kanau relations to assist each other through favours or other aid without the need for ritual. At the end of the 18th century, many of the Jinghpaw groups settling in Assam were Kapu Kanau and thus socially equal.

== Hkau Wang Magam ==
Hkau Wang Magam is a cyclical variation of mayu-dama practised between three lineages, in which the mayu-dama pairs alternate relationships for each cycle.

== History ==
In the mid-20th century, the Mayu-Dama system was customary in Kachin society although it was not strictly enforced and it was possible to legally marry a "Lawu-Lahta", an individual who was neither Mayu or Dama.

== Clannic correspondence ==
It has been recognised that the ethnic groups of the Kachin have corresponding clans. Among the Jinghpaw there are five main clans: the Maran, the Marip, the Nhkum, the Lahpai and the Lahtaw and in other ethnic groups, there are corresponding clans to the Jinghpaw ones, with the result that members of the two clans are seen as Kahpu-Kanau.
