= Wathann Film Fest =

Annual film festival in Yangon, Myanmar

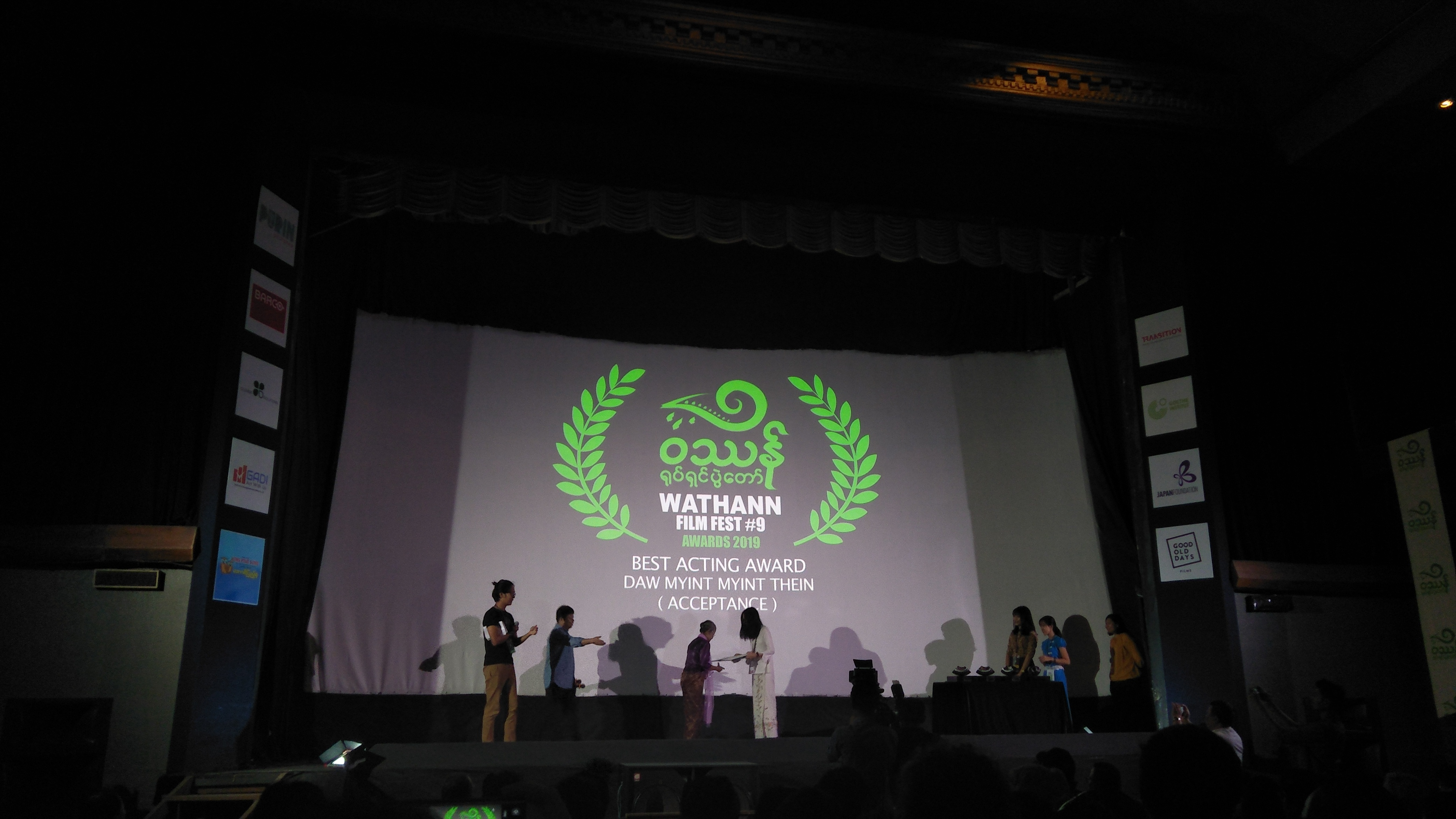
2019 Wathann Film Festival

The Wathann Film Fest (Burmese: ဝဿန် ရုပ်ရှင်ပွဲတော်)is a film festival held annually in Yangon, Myanmar, during the rainy season in September. With its launch in 2011, in a time of political transition after the general elections in 2010, it is the first film festival in Myanmar. Entries to the competition are categorized as Short Fiction, Documentary Film, or Other (in 2011 called "New Vision"). Winners of the competition for each award are selected by a jury. The length of films is limited to 15 minutes for fiction, animation, experimental film or video art or 30 minutes for documentary film.

The design of the Wathann Film Fest was inspired by the Berlin International Film Festival. The primary mission of the festival is, according to its director and co-founder, Thu Thu Shein, "to improve the standards of local films and inspire directors to produce higher-quality and more artistic films."

In its 2012 edition, the Wathann Film Fest features a writing contest organized by the NGO Burma Center Prague.

== See also ==
- Cinema of Burma
