= Kachin cuisine =

Culinary traditions of the Kachin peoples

Kachin cuisine is food indigenous to the Kachin peoples, who inhabit the northern areas of Myanmar, as well as parts of China and Arunachal Pradesh, associated with Kachin. Kachin restaurants have opened in Myanmar's commercial capital of Yangon, and Kachin migrants have brought the cuisine to other countries. Kachin cuisine is typified by its use of cold-climate ingredients like potatoes, wild game (e.g., venison and wild boar), and foraged herbs and vegetables. The traditional staple is rice, which is traditionally cultivated in hillside fields.

== Dishes ==
- Shat jam, a rice dish made from boiled rice, beans, carrots, mushrooms, and fried onions. Can also include meat such as chicken, pork or beef. Also known as Kachin danbauk (ကချင်‌ဒံပေါက်) in Burmese-speaking areas.
- Shan hkak, minced beef mixed with basil, garlic, ginger, chilies and pepper.
- Japhtu, a spicy side dish made of pounded chilies and garlic. There are many variations such as adding dried beef, fish, banana bud, or tomatoes.
- Si pa, a vegetable curry made with rice powder. Typical vegetables included are pumpkin, pumpkin leaf, mustard, mushroom, okra, long beans, and cauliflower.
- Silu, a curry made with rice powder and chicken, chilli, basil, garlic, and machyang si.
- Bamboo shoots, either salted or preserved is a common side dish.
- U hpa, a flavorful chicken porridge which includes rice, chicken, water, ginger, garlic, salt, chicken seasoning powder, fried onion and cilantro as the topping, pickle mustard as the side dish. This dish is a typical porridge bowl that the Kachin eat in some church functions, as it is easy to make for a group of people in short amount of time. On top of that, people eat this dish especially when they are sick as they believe that u hpa gives them the energy to recover from illness.
