= Singpho dialect =

Jingpho dialect of India

Singpho
- Native to: India
- Ethnicity: Singpho
- Native speakers: 7,300 (2011)
- Language family: Sino-Tibetan: Tibeto-Burman; Sal; Jingpho–Luish; Jingpho; Singpho

Language codes
- ISO 639-3: sgp
- Glottolog: sing1264
- ELP: Singpho

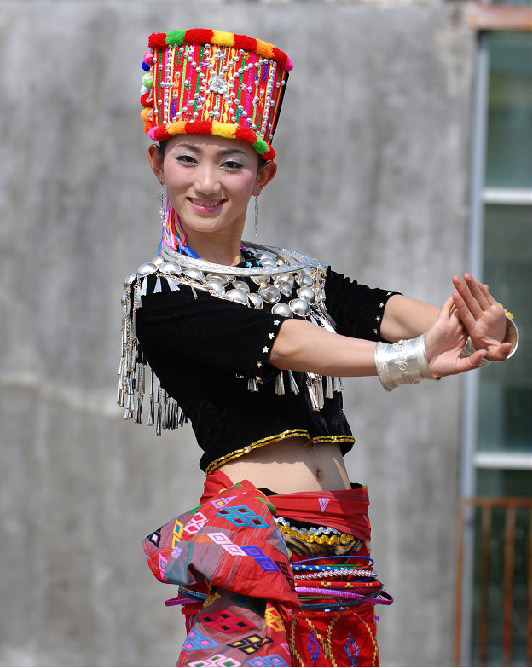
Traditional Singpho attire

Singpho is a endangered variety of the Jingpho language spoken by the Singpho people of Arunachal Pradesh and Assam, India. It is spoken by at least 7,300 people. "Singpho" is the local pronunciation of "Jingpho," and the dialect shares 50% lexical similarity with Jingpho.

The Jingpho (Jinghpaw, Chingp'o), or Kachin, language is a Tibeto-Burman language mainly spoken in Kachin State, Myanmar and Yunnan Province, China. The term Kachin language can refer either to the Jingpho language or to a group of languages spoken by various ethnic groups in the same region as Jingpho: Lisu, Lachit, Rawang, Zaiwa, Lhaovo, Achang (Ngo Chang), and Jingpho. These languages are from distinct branches of the highest level of the Tibeto-Burman family. The total estimated native speakers are 950,000 (2001 census).

Singpho is spoken the eastern extreme of northeastern India, such as Bordumsa Circle, Tirap District, Arunachal Pradesh, and also in nearby parts of Lohit District.

Singpho lacks the system of person-number agreement on an auxiliary particle found in the other dialects of Jingpho. DeLancey attributes this to creolization "in the broad sense", as a simplification brought about by a large population of enslaved Assamese rice farmers learning Singpho as a second language.
