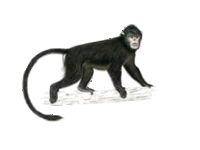

Conservation status
- Critically Endangered (IUCN 3.1)
- CITES Appendix I

Scientific classification
- Kingdom: Animalia
- Phylum: Chordata
- Class: Mammalia
- Order: Primates
- Family: Cercopithecidae
- Genus: Rhinopithecus
- Species: R. strykeri

Binomial name
- Rhinopithecus strykeri Geissmann et al., 2010
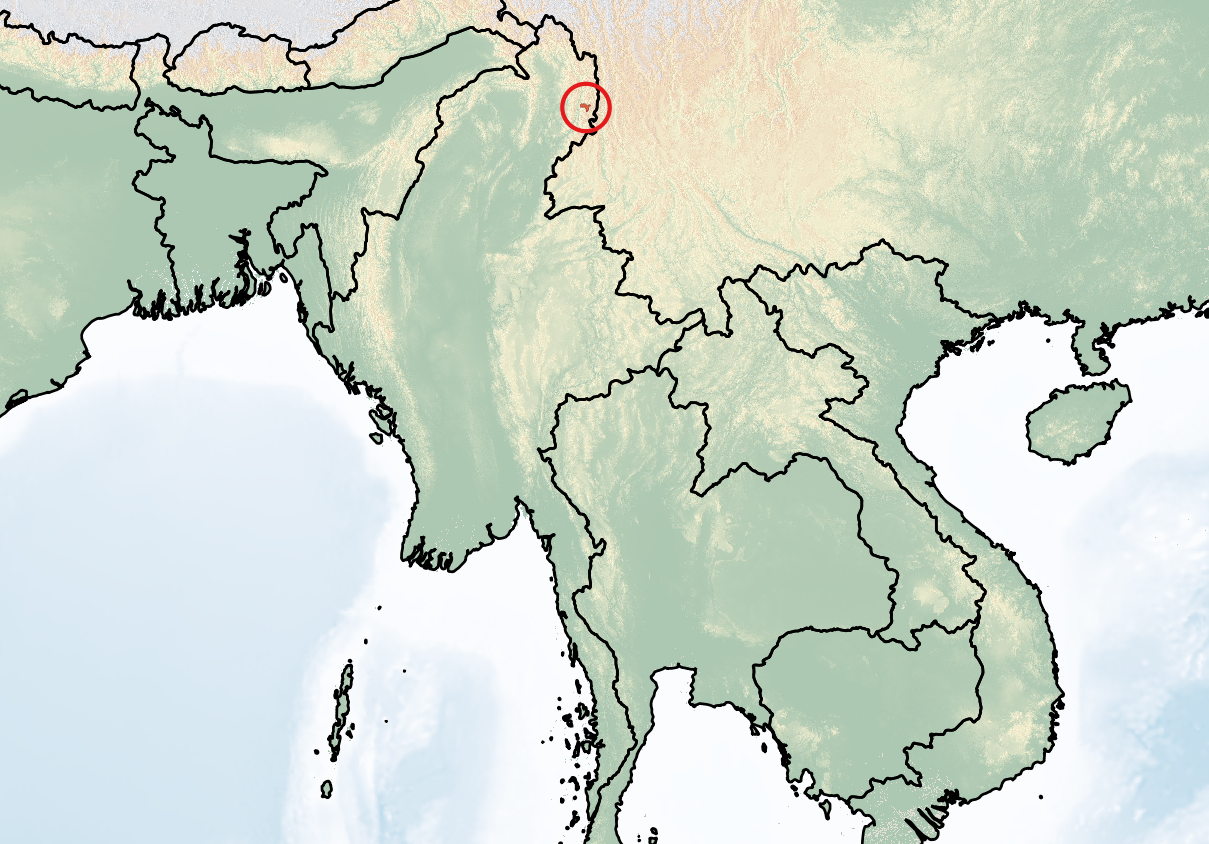

= Myanmar snub-nosed monkey =

Species of Old World monkey

The Myanmar snub-nosed monkey or Burmese snub-nosed monkey or black snub-nosed monkey (Rhinopithecus strykeri) is a critically endangered species of colobine monkey described in 2010 in northern Myanmar. It was formally described as a novel species of primate in 2011 based on its fur, beard and tail. Two groups of the species were described in China in 2011 and 2015, respectively.

The species is known in local dialects of Lisu people as mey nwoah and Law Waw people as myuk na tok te, both of which mean "monkey with an upturned face". Rain allegedly causes it to sneeze due to the short upturned nasal flesh around its nostrils. People from the area report that it sits with its head directed downwards, hiding its face between its knees when it rains.

== Discovery and taxonomy ==
The Myanmar snub-nosed monkey was first discovered in 2010 from Gaoligong Mountains of northeastern Kachin state in Myanmar. The species came to the attention of a team of scientists allied to the "Myanmar Primate Conservation Program" who were researching the status of the hoolock gibbon. The team, led by Swiss primatologist Thomas Geissman and Ngwe Lwin of the Myanmar Biodiversity and Nature Conservation Association (BANCA), were supported by Fauna & Flora International (FFI) and the People Resources and Conservation Foundation (PRCF). They reported the scientific identification in the American Journal of Primatology in 2011. The distinguishing features of the monkey are its fur, beard and tail. The specific name strykeri was given in honour of philanthropist Jon Stryker, president and founder of the Arcus Foundation, which also sponsored the project.

The type specimen was identified from the Maw River area. The specimen most closely examined was the skull (with mandible) and skin of a gutted adult male obtained from hunters in Pade, subsequently deposited in the Anthropological Institute and Museum of the University of Zürich. Additional sample skulls of animals killed some three years earlier, one male and one female, were also collected along with a bag made out of the skin of a juvenile caught in January 2010, all obtained in Htantan village.

The team encountered seven live specimens, including an infant, but these moved out of sight before they could be photographed or studied in detail. Other specimens were later found in the Yunnan Province and Salween River Basin in China. A camera trap set by a team of FFI, BANCA and PRCF researchers captured the first known images of live snub-nosed monkeys in January 2012.

== Physical characteristics ==
The monkey's fur is mostly black. Its crown consists of a thin, high, forward-curved crest of long, black hairs. It has protruding white ear tufts, a mostly naked face with pale pink skin, a "moustache" of whitish hairs above the upper lip, and a distinct white chin beard. The perineal area is white and clearly defined, and the limbs are mostly black; the inner sides of the upper arms and upper legs are blackish brown. The lips are prominent, and the nose upturned, allegedly causing the animal to sneeze in rainy weather.

As in other snub-nosed monkeys (members of Rhinopithecus) there is distinct sexual dimorphism with males having relatively larger bodies. Their tails are relatively long and normally approximately 1.4 times their body length. The first found specimen, an adult male, has a height of 55.5 centimetres (21.9 in), and a tail 78 cm (31 in) long. From several specimens available, males on average measure 55.5 cm in height with 78 cm tail length, weighing 17 kg; while females are 53 cm tall with 64.5 cm tail length, and weighing 9 to 11.6 kg.

== Distribution and habitat ==
The species spend summer months in temperate mixed forests at upper elevations of their range, and descend to lower ground in the winter to escape snow. In contrast to other snub-nosed monkeys which are mostly ground dwellers, the Myanmar snub-nosed monkeys are highly arboreal in habitat behaviour spending much of their times on trees. Males are outnumbered females by 1 to 2.1.

When first discovered, the only known specimens existed in three or four groups within a 270 square kilometres (100 sq mi) range at 1,700 to 3,200 metres (5,600–10,500 ft) above sea level in the eastern Himalayas, in the north-eastern section of Kachin State, the northernmost part of Burma (Myanmar). In 2011, a population was discovered in Pianma, Lushui County, Yunnan, China. The species is isolated from other snub-nosed Rhinopithecus by the Mekong and the Salween rivers; the other 4 species, golden, black, gray and Tonkin snub-nosed monkeys, are found in China and Vietnam. The species shares habitat with Shortridge's langur, stump-tailed macaque, Assam macaque, rhesus macaque, and northern pig-tailed macaque.

On the morning of 16 October 2011, a forest guard at Gaoligongshan National Nature Reserve in China took photos of a group of snub-nosed monkeys which were later identified as R. strykeri. This made a breaking headline in China especially on the urgent need for a conservation programme.

Habitat evaluation study shows that the Myanmar or black snub-nosed monkeys' habitat are covering 3670 km^{2} in Sino-Myanmar border, including core habitat of 1420 km^{2} .

Feeding habit study shows this species can consume more than 170 plant species and fungal foods, 15 species of lichens.

== Conservation status ==
Deforestation due to logging operations, isolation and hunting by local humans for food are considered dangers to the small extant population. The known Burmese population size is 260-330 individuals, and it is believed less than 200 remain in China. It is recognized as Critically Endangered by the IUCN. The Chinese population is found within the Gaoligongshan National Nature Reserve. In 2020, with technical input from Fauna and Flora International (FFI) and the Rainforest Trust, the Myanmar Forest department designated a new protected area called Imawbum National Park (386,176 acres) to protect the high-elevation forests in which the Myanmar snub-nosed monkey lives.

== Origin and evolution ==
Snub-nosed monkeys and the langurs are the two major groups of colobine monkeys in Asia. The monophyletic nature of these Asian monkeys has been established through molecular phylogeny using nuclear and mitochondrial DNA.

To further resolve the evolutionary status of these monkeys with emphasis on R. strykery, primatologists at German Primate Center analysed the complete mitochondrial genomes and 12 nuclear loci, including one X chromosomal, six Y chromosomal and five autosomal loci, from all ten odd-nosed monkey species. Their findings in 2012 indicated that Rhinopithecus is the sister lineage to other odd-nosed monkeys. Patterns of phylogenetic relatedness imply that these odd-nosed monkeys originated from northern Burma and later expanded into Indochina and Sundaland.

== Recognition ==
Taxonomic experts at the International Institute for Species Exploration honoured the monkey species as one of the Top 10 New Species 2012. Its unique appearance, behaviour and vulnerability make it outstanding not only in novelty, but also in conservation issues.

== See also ==
- Snub-nosed monkey
- Primates described in the 2000s
- List of endangered and protected species of China
