= Myanmar Christian Fellowship of the Blind =

- Founded: 1975
- Founder: Rev. U Thein Lwin ?
- Type: Non-profit Organization and school
- Purpose: Well-being of all blind people, especially children aged from 5 to 25 no matter sex, race or religion
- Location(s): (Kawaichan), Yangon, Myanmar, and Myitkyina, Kachin State, Myanmar
- Key people: Rev U Thein Lwin, (General Secretary), Saya Saw Thaung Kyi, Executive secretary of (Evangelism)
- Revenue: ?
- Employees: ?
- Website: www.mcfblind.com/index.htm

The Myanmar Christian Fellowship of the Blind, founded in 1975, is a non-profit organization that created schools for the well-being of the Blind Christians in Myanmar.

== History ==
The MCFB was founded with 14 blind Christians in Myanmar on August 4, 1975, by the mission of Yangon city church.

Its missions are along with

- Printing and Production Of Braille Books
- Production of talking books for the blind
- Bible Training Course
- Job Placement Training
- Parents Training on (How to raise a blind child)
- Capacity Building ( for staff )

While the school campus in Yangon was developed, the Myitkyina education centre for the Blind was also opened by the missions of MCFB in 1980. Admissions are checked through blind children aged five to twenty five (was fourteen at the earlier time), but it was allowed from all backgrounds of sex, race or religion. Its activities comprising the competition of all sports game for disable in Myanmar Blind Schools, training, refresher welcome, celebration of MCFB day, music and arts performance, community exchange program, and so on. To date, Myitkyina education centre had admitted 75 blind children (2007) while Yangon education centre with a total of 152 in 2006.

== Departments ==
1. Christian Education and Evangelism Department. 2. Communication, Information and Teaching Aids Production Department 3. Rehabilitation and Placement Department. 4. Yangon Education Centre for the Blind. 5. Myitkyina Education Centre for the Blind.
