= Blogging in Myanmar =

In Myanmar (Burma), some blogs started in 2005. The earlier blogs were written in English, as there was no unicode font at that time, so they could not post in their mother language.

After the Zawgyi font was released (created by Alpha Mandalay), Nyi Lynn Seck put the Zawgyi font in his blog and started the Myanmar blog. In 2007, some Myanmar bloggers established the MBS (Myanmar Bloggers Society), and they celebrated with a seminar on September 1, 2007. It is very difficult to write blogs locally because the government banned blog websites after the Saffron Revolution in September 2007. However, despite the ban, bloggers are still writing about the freedom of Myanmar and sharing their knowledge. MBS's slogan is "We blog, we unite."

== History ==
Most Burmese bloggers came from internet forums. At first, topics such as general knowledge and literature were discussed, and poems, essays, and articles were posted on the forums. Blogging was in part of the Politics of Myanmar. The military government has banned Burmese blogs for promoting democracy, and bloggers have been jailed.

Burmese bloggers celebrated the first ever "blog day" in Myanmar at Yangon and Mandalay in 2007. In 2008, Myanmar Blog Press organized the Contest for Best Myanmar Blog Academy Awards 2008.

== Notable bloggers ==
Nay Phone Latt, one of the leading famous bloggers in Myanmar, was sentenced to 20 years in jail for posting a cartoon of the military leader Than Shwe. Later, he became an MP.

Ashin Mettacara, a Burmese Buddhist monk and popular blogger. He was named Nobel Ambassador to the Internet by Internet for Peace.

== Sources ==
- Nizza, Mike (28 September 2007). "Burmese Government Clamps Down on Internet". The Lede.
- Nizza, Mike (27 September 2007). "Burmese Bloggers Get the Word Out". The New York Times.
- Mettacara, Ashin (6 August 2008). "Blogging for Burma". The Guardian.
