= Manaw (festival) =

Manaw Festival (Burmese: မနောပွဲ, Jinghpaw: Manau Poi) is an annual traditional dance festival celebrated by Kachin people. Mostly held at Myitkyina, Kachin State also known as မနောမြေ( Manaw Land ) in Myanmar and also celebrated by Kachin people around the world. Manaw is the largest festival in Myitkyina, held at the beginning of January. Manaw Festival is the most significant event for Kachin People. Tribes of Kachin gather together in Manaw ground and dance around the erected Manaw poles. According to the professional narrators of Kachin traditional folktale (Jaiwa, Dumsa), for the Kachin people, the Kachin Manau is initiated by birds for the Kachin people.

== History ==
According to Kachin mythology, Manaw was first performed by Nat, spirits, and birds. Nat, spirits invited living creatures from land to participate in the Manaw dance in heaven. Only birds have participated. Afterward, birds came down to land and they taught humans how to dance Manaw dance.

From another folk-tale, there were 9 Suns appeared on earth. Humans were suffered a lot from that incident. They decided to send birds to heaven for mercy. Birds were performed Manaw dance and sang for Nat, spirits. They were pleasured by their performance and they let them dance Manaw dance on earth. Later, men have emulated the dance from birds and started dance Manaw dance to worship Nat, spirits.

Manaw ( Manau ) was called after the proverb " Masaw Nau Ningsan Jau". 'Masaw Ningsan' means heaven and above. 'Nau', 'Jau', 'Jaw' men give and worship. Manau means worship to God or heaven.

In 1947, a Manau was held to celebrate the end of Japanese occupation. Following independence, the Burmese government helped provide finances for the Myitkyina Manau annually on Kachin State Day up until 1958.

== Manau Festival of Birds ==
While inhabiting Hkrang Hku Majoi, the Kachin tribe had a historical event which helped them to develop a plan for the technical Manau dance, It said that there were many banyan trees growing in only one place of Hkrang Hku Majoi, The professional narrators of Kachin traditional folktale (Jaiwa, Dumsa) called"Sut Kum Yan hpun si" to banyan fruits. There was a young man called "Ma Ding Yau, who tied a string to a branch at the top of a banyan tree. Ma Ding Yau tied a string to a branch at the top of the banyan tree because he was terrible for people. Ma Ding Yau could understand birds" language because he had grown up under that same banyan tree by making a tent. Fortunately, it was coincident with the time, which the banyan trees bearing fruits while he was hung up under the banyan tree, The bird called Hkawngrang u also suggested eating the banyan fruits only after they finish the celebration of the Manau festival.

The bird called, Kataw Naw u used to warn the birds whenever doing the meeting by shouting with the pronouncement, Bret, Bret, Bret which means here, here, the eagles are coming. For the fact of that, they could not celebrate the Manau festival, Every day, they used to be afraid of the eagles and run away from the eagles, The birds supposed that the bird Kataw Naw u lie to them. So all the birds prepared to sell the bird Kataw Naw u to Assam called Mungnun Ga. After the bird Kataw Naw u Had been sold out, the birds continued to conduct the meeting, but the bird was eaten by the eagles till the bird generation was gone, Therefore, they discussed calling back the bird, Kataw Naw u from Assam, Kataw Naw u arrived; he was again coincident with the time to fruit the banyan fruit.

During that time, the rich couple, Jawa Rum Ja and his wife Madai Ma Hpraw Nga, were preparing to celebrate the Manau festival in the Hpu um region from the Hkrang Hku Majoi. Jawa Rum Ja calls back Mading Yau, who was hung up on the banyan tree because Mading Yau understands the bird language and has learned a technical system and practical function of Manau from the birds. This Manau festival is the first festival.

== Role ==
No	Bird	Role
1	U Ra U	Manau priest
2	U ka u	Preacher of Manau
3	U Krang U	Future fortune teller
4	U Gum U	Assistant
5	U Hkru Tu	The pounder of rice
6	U Gam U	Collector of food
7	U ri U	Collector of vegetables
8	Chyik Taroi U	Cutter of raw meant
9	U Graw U	Bundler of Manau Food
10	Kumba Udut U	Beater of the Manau drum
11	Tsau Gawng U	Player of the Manau gong
12	U Yen Gawng U	General cleaner
13	U Yung Yu U	Census taker
14	Shingra Set U	Master of ceremony
15	Chyanyet U	Announcer for the Manau Food
16	U Tu U	Distributor of the Manau Food
17	Nbring Pri U	Peacemaker
18	Tsau Gawng U	Inviter
19	Kataw Naw U	Security
20	Lamung Sinwa U	Leader of Manau dance

== Types of Manaw ( Manau ) ==
Manaw dance is celebrated only on the five most important occasions.

1. To celebrate victory in war.
2. To gather the clans to meet and settle accounts, make plans for the future.
3. To commemorate the death of an elder.
4. For a housewarming.
5. To bring good fortune to new farmlands and cultivation.

There are originally 14 types of Manaw. They are

1. Sut Manau, 2. Kumran Manau, 3.Ninghtan Manau, 4.Padang Manau, 5.Ju Manau, 6.Htingram Manau, 7.Ningshawn Manau, 8.Kumrum Manau, 9.Nausawt Manau, 10.Htinghtang Manau, 11.HKridip Manau, 12. Roidu kaput Manau, 13.Hkindu tep Manau, and 14.Sha Dip Hpawt Manau.

The five principal Manaw festivals
1.Sut Manau	Sut Manau is a celebration of wealthiness and a thanksgiving festival.
2. Padang Manau or Rawt Manau	Padang Manau is a celebration of victory in battles.
3. Ju Manau	Ju Manau held after the funeral of Duwa and Dujan ( Chiefs ).
4. Kumran Manau	Kumran Manau was held to bless families who have traditionally decided to leave their folds and build their own houses and build their land.
5. Sha Dip Hpawt Manau	Sha Dip Hpawt Manau is held to defeat evil spirits that may exist on new grounds to be cultivated.

== Features of the Manaw ==
=== Manaw Patterns (Manau Maka) and Manaw Poles ===
Manaw patterns ( Manau Maka ) are signature looks of Manaw Festival and Kachin people. The Manaw poles are a totally of 12 pillars connected and stand in the middle of the Manaw ground. It's high at about 20 meters. Manaw patterns are painted on the Manaw poles. Every pattern on poles has different meanings. Also, the pictures of Sun, Star, Moon, Hornbill, and other animals are painted on Manaw poles. The patterns and designs on poles can be changed depending on different places and occasions.

=== Dance ===
Manaw dance is the rhythmical dance. Manaw Dance is performed by all various tribes of Kachin led by two chiefs ( Naushawng ) leading. Behind the chiefs, fellow members of various tribes of Kachin follow the moves, dance steps and they have to change the rhythm and footsteps when the chiefs do. In the beginning, men and women are dance separately. Later, they combine in the middle of the Manaw dance. The chiefs move the footsteps by following the patterns of Manaw poles.

=== Music ===
Kachin traditional musical instruments are booming drum ( Bau ) and flute ( Sumpi). The musicians are standing in front of the Manaw poles. The vocals team is singing in a group. The instruments team plays a series of gongs, drums, and traditional reed instruments. The Manaw songs are not always the same. Songs are composed and sing depend on the type of Manaw.

=== Costume ===
The chiefs of the Manaw wear long robes with headdresses of hornbill, peacock feathers and horns. Fellow Kachin people who participated in Manaw dance have to wear tribal traditional dresses. Only those who wear traditional dresses are allowed to participate in Manaw dance. Men have to hold a sword while dancing. Women have to hold handkerchief or big fan.
