= Myanmar Red Cross Society =

Myanmar organization

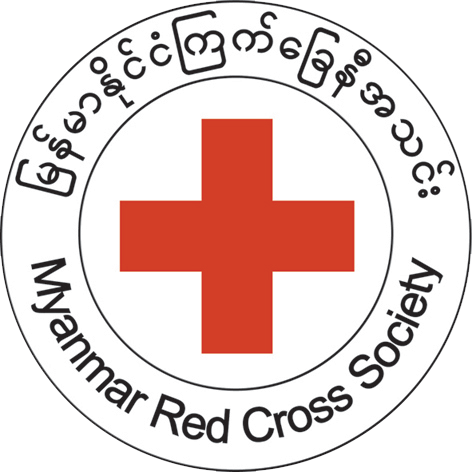
- Abbreviation: MRCS
- Predecessor: Indian Red Cross Society
- Formation: 1 April 1937
- Type: Humanitarian organization
- Legal status: National organization
- Headquarters: Razathingaha Road, Dekhinathiri Township, Nay Pyi Taw, Myanmar.
- Region served: Myanmar
- President: Prof. Dr. Myo Nyunt
- Main organ: General Assembly
- Affiliations: International Committee of the Red Cross
- Volunteers: 250000
- Website: www.redcross.org.mm
- Formerly called: Burma Red Cross Society

Myanmar Red Cross Society (MRCS; Burmese: မြန်မာနိုင်ငံ ကြက်ခြေနီ အသင်း, romanized: myanmarninengan kyaathkyayne aasainn) was founded in 1937 and it was earlier called Burma Red Cross. It has its headquarters in Yangon.

== History ==
In 1920, the Society came into existence as a branch of the Indian Red Cross Society. When Burma was politically separated from India in 1937, the organisation attained national status and was recognised as Burma Red Cross Society. The International Committee of the Red Cross (ICRC) recognised it as a National Society in 1939. The Society was admitted to the International Federation of Red Cross and Red Crescent Societies in 1946. The Burma Red Cross Act was enacted in 1959 and amended subsequently in 1964, 1971 and 1988.

The 1959 (MRCS) Act confers responsibility to the National Society in implementing humanitarian activities and alleviating human suffering. The St. John Ambulance Brigade Overseas was taken over by the Society as Burma Ambulance Brigade under the 1959 Act. The Society was renamed Myanmar Red Cross Society in accordance with legislative change of the name from Burma to Myanmar in 1989.

== Governance and management ==
The General Assembly is the highest governing body of the Society and is convened every three years. The Central Council is the governing body of the MRCS between the sessions of the General Assembly. The Central Council comprises 40 members, out of which 17 members represent States and Divisions level branches. The governance of the Society is formed by 10 Executive Committee members. 5 out of 10 members are retired professionals and who work full-time on voluntary basis, are responsible for providing guidance for making policy, giving directions and guidance in the implementation of the activities of the Society. The structure of National Headquarters (NHQ) consists of six Divisions and two Units. They are Administrative Division, Disaster Management Division, Finance Division, Health Division, Training Division and Communication Division, Development and Coordination Unit and Protocol Unit.

The management is headed by the executive director, who is the full-time Executive Committee member of the National Society. The executive director carries out his functions under the authority of the Central Council and the executive committee. The Society is the largest humanitarian organization in Myanmar with its nationwide network of 330 branches (townships) with over 250000 volunteers throughout the country.

== Awards ==
A member of Myanmar Red Cross Society won Henry Dunant Medal in 1977 for saving a soldier whose car fell into the Ayeyarwady River which was icy cold at that time . His name was Sai Aung Hlaing Myint. He was from Kachin State.
