= Myanmar Maternal and Child Welfare Association =

The Myanmar Maternal and Child Welfare Association
- Founded: 1948, Reinstated April 1991
- Type: advocacy group
- Purpose: promoting the health and well being of mothers and children
- Location: South Okkalapa Township, Yangon, Myanmar
- Region served: Burma
- Method: Media attention, direct-appeal campaigns Political lobbying
- Key people: President
- Volunteers: 8 million (2006)
- Website: www.mmcwa-myanmar.org

The Myanmar Maternal and Child Welfare Association (Burmese: မြန်မာနိုင်ငံ မိခင်နှင့်ကလေး စောင့်ရှောက်ရေး အသင်း, abbreviated MMCWA) is a non-governmental organisation in Burma which aims to protects mothers and their children in the country.

Although it dates back to 1948, it was supported by the Burmese government when it was established in its new centre in April 1991, particularly because the organisation aimed to cover much of the country in protection. As of 2008, the MMCWA functions with 324 township associations, and 11,233 branch associations formed to undertake health and welfare activities nationwide. It has over 2,000,000 volunteer workers, serving the organisation throughout Burma.

The headquarters are at the corner of Thanthuma Road and Parami Road in South Okkalapa Township, Yangon.

== History ==
After Burma gained independence, maternal and child welfare associations were set up in towns and cities. But those association lacked a central organisation and existed only as local entities. From the time independence was gained to 1964, up to 120 maternal and child welfare associations were formed. The Myanmar Maternal and Child Welfare Association (Centre) was formed on 30 April 1991 and has subsidiary bodies such as the centre, state/division, district supervisory committees, township associations and branch associations.

== Aim ==
The aim of the association is to contribute to the emergence of a peaceful modern developed nation by improving the health, education, social affairs and economic affairs of families including mother and children, with the priority towards the rural population.

== Activities ==
Currently the Myanmar Maternal and Child Welfare Association is carrying out the following activities:

- Health activities
- Education activities
- Economic activities
- Social activities
- Cooperation with local and foreign organisation
- Planning annual programmes for future activities
