= Foreign Correspondents' Club of Myanmar =

Club in Myanmar

- မြန်မာနိုင်ငံ နိုင်ငံသတင်းထောက်များအသင်း
- Formation: 1989
- Type: Foreign Correspondents' Club
- Legal status: Active
- Location: Myanmar
- Website: sites.google.com/site/myanmarfcc

The Foreign Correspondents' Club of Myanmar (Burmese: မြန်မာနိုင်ငံ နိုင်ငံသတင်းထောက်များအသင်း; FCCM) is a members-only Foreign Correspondents' Club for the foreign media, business and diplomatic community based in Myanmar. The FCCM was founded in 1989.
