= People Resources and Conservation Foundation =

- Formation: 1995|05|10
- Founded: 1995
- Founder: Fernando and Marla Potess
- Type: INGO, International non-government, non-profit, non-membership organization incorporated under Section 501(c)(3) of the United States Internal Revenue Code
- Purpose: Environmentalism, Biodiversity Conservation, Sustainable Development, Community Empowerment, Forestry, Habitat Restoration
- Headquarters: Los Angeles USA
- Region served: South and Southeast Asia, Asia Pacific
- Founder, President Director, Chief Executive Officer: Fernando Potess
- Key people: Imanul Huda
- Revenue: USD 1.4M
- Volunteers: 4 Part-time
- Website: www.prcfoundation.org

People Resources and Conservation Foundation (PRCF) is an international non-governmental organization that helps local people in developing countries protect their natural environment. Its headquarters are in the United States but its conservation fieldwork is carried out in a number of Southeast Asian countries. PRCF has joined collaborative research projects on new animal species in Southeast Asia, such as the Myanmar/Burmese snub-nosed monkey. The organization also sets up programs to help native cultures retain their cultural identity through projects such as basket and fabric weaving.

== Mission ==
PRCF’s stated mission is to ‘conserve biodiversity, ecosystem services and local cultural identities through participatory solutions that protect and promote the wise use of natural resources, support socioeconomic development of communities and enable effective adaptation to climate change’. The organization is concerned with endangered species (species assigned an IUCN category of threat) and loss of their critical habitat, land degradation and climate change. It also works with local communities to promote sustainable livelihoods, participatory land use planning and the revitalization of traditional cultural arts.

== History ==
The organization was founded in 1995 by two biologists-cum-conservationists from the United States and Colombia, Marla and Fernando Potess. In 1995 the first of the PRCF country programs – PRCF Indonesia – was established, with conservation and community development projects based in West Kalimantan, an Indonesian province on the island of Borneo. Other country programs were later established in Cambodia, Myanmar/Burma, Vietnam and Thailand.

== Funding ==
PRCF is a nonprofit foundation, receiving gifts and donations from individuals as well as grants from private and government organizations. In 2010, PRCF derived funding as follows: 15% from the public, 63% from private sources (such as the McKnight Foundation) and 22% from government sources (such as the United States Fish and Wildlife Service [USFWS]). Major donors to PRCF during 2010 were the Arcus Foundation and the Critical Ecosystem Partnership Fund (CEPF).

== Conservation work ==
PRCF works collaboratively with local communities and government authorities at field sites. It also partners with national and international conservation organizations in the countries of operation.

In 2010 PRCF was a member of a joint survey team that discovered a new primate species in northern Myanmar: the Burmese Snub-nosed Monkey (Rhinopithecus strykeri). The species was named in honor of Jon Stryker, President and Founder of the Arcus Foundation. His organization's grant to PRCF helped lead to the discovery of the species.

As of June 2012, PRCF and partners have worked to protect 16 endangered or threatened species in Southeast Asia. These include the critically endangered White-shouldered Ibis (Pseudibis davisoni) and Tonkin Snub-nosed Monkey (Rhinopithecus avunculus) plus the endangered Western Hoolock Gibbon (Hoolock hoolock) and Francois’ Langur (Trachypithecus francoisi).
