= Myanmar War Veterans Organization =

Official veterans' organization for Myanmar Armed Forces veterans

The Myanmar War Veterans' Organisation (Burmese: မြန်မာနိုင်ငံစစ်မှုထမ်းဟောင်းအဖွဲ့; abbreviated MWVO) is the official veterans' organisation for military personnel who have retired from the Myanmar Armed Forces (Tatmadaw).

== History ==
Veterans who retired from the Tatmadaw after serving in various roles assigned to them since national independence, formed various local veterans' organisations since 1948. Those organisations were officially organised in 1973 and the Constitution of the Veterans' Organisation and fundamental rules were adopted in 1975. Necessary amendments to the Constitution and the Fundamental Rules were made in 1976, 1982, and 1986. After the Tatmadaw assumed the duties of the State in 1988 (8888 Uprising), the State Law and Order Restoration Council (later named the State Peace and Development Council) promulgated the Myanmar Veterans' Law and the Rules Relating to the Law in August 1989 and the Myanmar Veterans' Organisation was re-organised. Due to weaknesses in implementing its mission, the State Peace and Development Council reorganised the Central Organising Committee with 30 members on 21 October 1998. A further reorganisation with 42 members was carried out on 15 March 2005. Currently, the Myanmar Veterans' Organisation operates under the supervision of Central Organisation Committee members and has 19 States and Divisions Veterans' Supervisory Committees. As of March 2007, membership strength is over 170,000 with 89,775 members and 79,519 auxiliary members. On 10 December 2021, the U.S. Department of the Treasury imposed sanctions on MWVO.

== Objectives ==
- To carry out national defence and security duties under the leadership of the Tatmadaw
- To provide mutual assistance among members of the Veterans' Organisation and families
- To participate and provide assistance in the nation-building activities together with other partner organisations

== Major tasks ==
- National politics
- National defence and security
- Economics
- Social affairs and welfare
- Activities that are beneficial to the people
