= Lachik =

The Lachik, also known as the Lashi or Lacid, are a Kachin sub-tribe and ethnic group who speak the Lashi language. The Kachin people are a confederation of six ethnic groups.

The majority of Lachik people live in northern Myanmar's Kachin State, Shan State, and western Yunnan.

== Dress ==
Lachik costumes differ from other Kachin sub-tribes and have specific meaning.
