= Kachin people =

Ethnic group in Myanmar and China

Kachin peoples
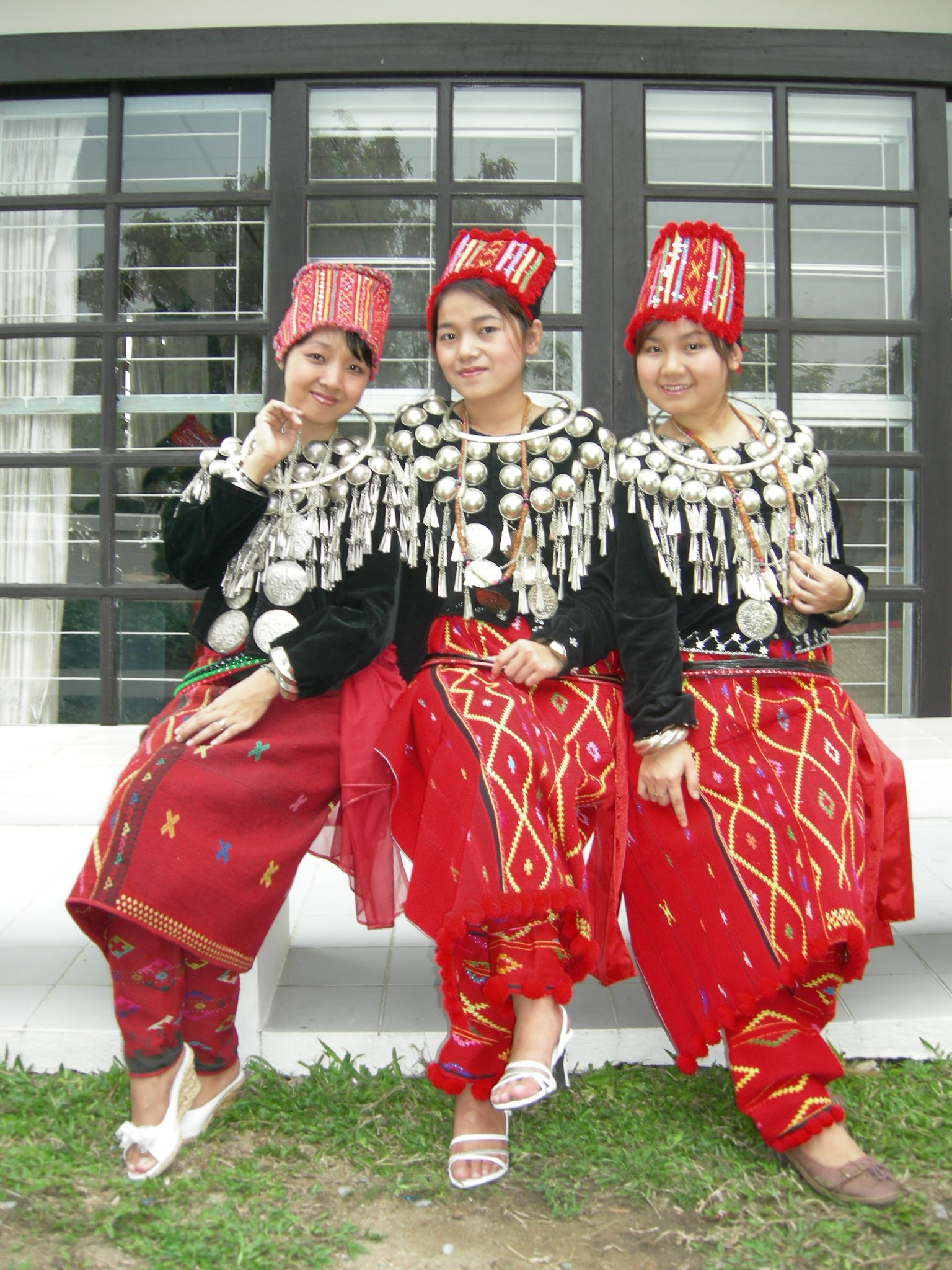
- Jingpo women in traditional dress

Regions with significant populations
- Myanmar (Jingpo, Lashi/Lachik, Lhao Vo/Maru, Zaiwa, Lisu, Rawang)

Languages
- Jingpo, Lashi, Lhao Vo/Maru, Zaiwa, Lisu, Rawang, Burmese, Shan

Religion
- Christianity 65% Animism 25% Buddhism 10%

Related ethnic groups
- Other Tibeto-Burman peoples

The Kachin peoples (Kachin: Ga Hkyeng, lit. 'red soil'; Burmese: ကချင်လူမျိုး, pronounced [kətɕɪ̀ɰ̃ lù mjó]) are a collection of diverse ethnolinguistic groups inhabiting the Kachin Hills in northern Myanmar's Kachin State, as well as Yunnan Province in China, and the northeastern Indian states of Arunachal Pradesh and Assam. Approximately 1.5 million Kachin people live in this region.

In contemporary usage, the Kachin peoples typically refer to a specific grouping of four to six ethnicities: the Jingpo, the Zaiwa, the Lashi/Lachik, the Lawngwaw/Maru, and to a lesser extent, the Rawang and the Lisu. Kachin identity is heterogenous and diverse, as it encompasses various ethnolinguistic groups who share overlapping territories, but do not all share coherent cultural practices and integrated social structures. Some definitions distinguish Kachin and Shan (Tai) peoples though some Kachin people have demonstrated the over-simplicity of the concept of lineage-based ethnic identity by culturally "becoming Shans".

The most widely spoken Kachin language is Jingpho, which serves as a regional lingua franca. Jingpho has a number of dialects and is written using a Latin-based script developed in the late 19th century. A version in Burmese script was later created. Various dialects are also spoken in southwestern China and northeastern India, where it is called Singpho. In neighbouring China, "Kachin" is interchangeably used with "Jingpo", who comprise the largest subgroup.

== Ethnonyms ==
Below are common ethnonyms used by the Kachin subgroups:

Myanmar	China	Exonyms
Jinghpaw	Jingpo	Kachin
Zaiwa	Zaiwa	Atsi
Lhaovo	Langsu	Maru
Lacid	Leqi	Lashi
Rawang		Nung
Lisu	Lisu	Yawyin

=== Exonyms ===
The etymology of the ethnonym "Kachin" is unclear, but it likely predates British colonial rule. Burmese and Shan speakers used the term as an exonym to refer to the Jingpo, the largest Kachin subgroup. During the colonial era, "Kachin" became a broad administrative label for all non-Shan and non-Burmese speakers in the Kachin Hills. As the British developed formal classifications, they used language as a key criterion, which led to inconsistencies—some groups labeled as Kachin were not linguistically, ethnically, or racially related to others.

This ambiguity raised questions about whether "Kachin" meant one community and language, many communities with one language, or simply a geographical designation. In the post-independence era, the Burmese government continued to adopt this exonym. The Burmese government classifies the Kachin as one of the country's 8 national races. Today, the Burmese government recognises 12 groups within the "Kachin " national race:

1. Jingpo
2. Maru (Lawgore)
3. Rawang
4. Lashi (La Chit)
5. Zaiwa (Atsi)
6. Lisu

=== Endonyms ===
The Kachin peoples lack a collectively agreed endonym. Some Christian institutions, which tend to be dominated by Jingpo speakers, have proposed the term "Jinghpaw Wunpawng" (lit. 'Jingpo confederation') or "Jinghpaw," while the Kachin Independence Organisation uses the term "Wunpawng." These terms remain contested by non-Jingpo ethnic groups that reject a Kachin identity premised on Jingpo identity and culture.

== History ==
Kachin oral history states that they all descended from Măjoi Shingra Bum or Kăang Shingra also known as Măjoi Shingra Hkindawt. The meaning of the words are plain and refer to a "naturally flat mountain", "central (or common) plain" and "borders of the common plain". This has been alluded to referencing the plateau and was orally stated to be in the northern direction of the Kachin homeland. Further insight were not detailed but some descriptions of snow suggested the Dapha bum in northeastern Assam. The Kachins lived in the watershed of upper Burma surrounded by the Măli hka, N'Mai hka, N-Shawn and the Hpunggawn. The Kachin were unable to move south below the 28th parallel north until a few centuries ago. This migration is attributed to the weakening of the Shan states and Yunnan in the region.

Kachin historians argue that the Kachin descended from the northern Tibetan Plateau and settled in the Putao plains. Some Kachins entered Myanmar from the north, while others migrated to Assam, and this would have happened c. 100 A.D. Other historians argue that the ancestors of the Kachin entered the Triangle Area in the 5th century. Earlier interpretations place their migration through Putao in the 17th century. Following their gradual migration into the mountainous regions of northern Myanmar, the Kachin established themselves in the highlands, where they remained largely independent of the surrounding lowland states. They frequently conducted raids against neighboring Shan and Burmese communities, which in turn carried out retaliatory expeditions against the Kachin.

During the staying in the lower basin at the confluence of the Chyai Hka and the Mali Hka where they met tribes such as the Maru, Lashi, Azi Rawang and Lisu who had descended from the N'Mai Hka. During their stay at this region they attacked and robbed Chinese merchants who would cross the region to India. This forced the Chinese into keeping good relations with the Kachin. Chinese chronicles likewise state tribes such as the Pú (Chinese: 濮) lived to the west of Yongchang who produced rhinocerous, elephants, tortoise shells, jade, amber, cowries, gold, silver, salt, cinnamon, cotton trees, hill paddy and panicled millet. Leach argues that despite the identity changes, the use of the term "Pú" remained in use as an exonym by tribes. The Maru people call the Jinghpaw speaker p'ok. The Shans of Hkamti Long referred to Kachin serfs and slaves as kha-p'ok (serf p'ok). Jinghpaw itself might be written as Chying-p'ok. The Jinghpaw language being a Tibeto-Burman language seems to suggest a northern migration, although there is no concrete evidence for such a theory.

The previous inhabitants of the Kachin Hills taught the Kachin the method of making and using stone pots which led to the terming of the regions Ga-gam di galaw ai shara (transl. stone pot making region). Neolithic tools in the Kachin Hills also showed that there were inhabitants before the Kachins.

Leach divided the Kachins into three regions. Zone A was west of the Irrawaddy and North of Myiktinna, stretching to the Hukawng Valley, where rich monsoon rainfall allowed wet-rice cultivation. Zone B consists of crop rotations on hillsides. These individuals were reliant on the valley dwelling Shans for their rice supply. The Palaung Hill state of Tawngpeng held a law that no trading caravan could enter their state to buy tea unless they brought a cargo or rice or salt. Mong Mao similarly pressured the Kachins into cooperation by denying access to the valley rice lands. Zone C were the mountain dwellers where the land was steeper and valleys weren't large enough for irrigated paddy. Zone C relied on trade routes through the mountain barriers and used the caravan taxes for their own economic growth.

During the 8th and 9th centuries, the Kachin Hills came under the influence of the Kingdom of Nanzhao. Geluofeng of Nanzhao opened trade with India and established permanent garrisons along the route. The Chinese chronicles mentioned routes to India and tribes inhabiting them, which were conscripted by Nanzhao, but these names cannot be evidently applied to modern groups. The Kachin Hills later came under the influence of powerful Shan states, and even after the centralisation of Burmese rule, the Hkamti Shans and the Mogaung were under dubious sovereignty until 1796. By the 18th century, the jade mines west of Kamaing became a major part of Kachin politics. The weakening of Shan polities led to Shan political power struggles and the engagement of Kachin mercenaries to fight battles. As a result, the Kachin in the Hukawng Valley gained incredible influence and enslaved the Shans.

=== Rule in Hukawng Valley ===
Following the outbreak of the gumsa and gumlao conflict for political change, Chief Laisai Nawng Gumkhawng went to seek land in the Hukawng Valley settling at Tungyang Hkapra in the upper Daru River. He captured a Hkumman (Khuman Naga) prisoner and taught them Jinghpaw over the years before cementing a friendship and learning about the Hukawng Valley. Hkumman Wa became his guide and lead him to the Hukawng Valley. However a dispute lead to him injuring Hkumman Wa and requiring a sacrifice of two chickens to appease the Jahtung Nat. They met the Naga village of Kassangai who led them to the Tanai Valley of Hkawnsawng Chyauhpa, Pangsang Chyauhpa and Hpaknaw Chyauhpa. He then met with Mainghkwan Wa . In the Hukawng Valley were two groups consisting of the Hkawseng Shans and the Hkumman Nagas. Chief Laisai returned to his village and set out once more with Laawn Nawng Hpung and Ure Tsalung Nawng (ancestor of Lahpai tribe). At the Daru Pass, Laisai, with his companions, made an agreement about their sovereignty and territories of the Hukawng Valley. They returned to their original villages before beginning Gumsa-led settlements in the Hukawng Valley.

Laisai settled at Htangkha， Ure Tsalung Nawng moved to the foot of the Wantuk Range and Lajawn Nawng Hpung settled at Sengtawng in the Tanai Hka. Other migrations followed such as the Tangai, Maigaw, Wakhyet Munglung and Ningru settling Mungsun Darang Range. The Sanantu and Shingbwiyang people settled in the upper Tabye River. The Ningam and Htaumaja settled at the Mawning River. The N'Hpawn settled in the lower Tabye. Some Kachins such as the Lajawn Sumbaw people settled along the Tanai River and Tawang River. Hput Htingkhrai Tsasen stayed at Nawngseng. The Tangai Tsasen, the Sharaw and the Hpuyin Ningkhrawp settled in Manaw Hka Bang Ga (modern day Gumlao N'Dup Dumsa Tract).

Laisai continued to expand his territory and travelled down through the Munggawng River where he came into conflict with the Shweri Nagas. To defeat them he contacted aid from Machyang Kadang N'Ding and rewarded them with the land of the defeated Naga tribes. Machyang Kadang N'Ding was made a chief and founded his namesake tribe. His settlements saw a surge of settlers from Machyawng, Kadang, Walabum, Bungkhaw, Wadat, Nawnghku Shingbwi, Kasentu N'Nen N'Bungkhu Maisang, Hkinram Le, Labawng Kumnen, N'Ga Jauyang and Ninggam. Machyang's peoples settled at the Hkummau River and formed the Wadat group later on.

=== British colonial rule and Burmese independence ===
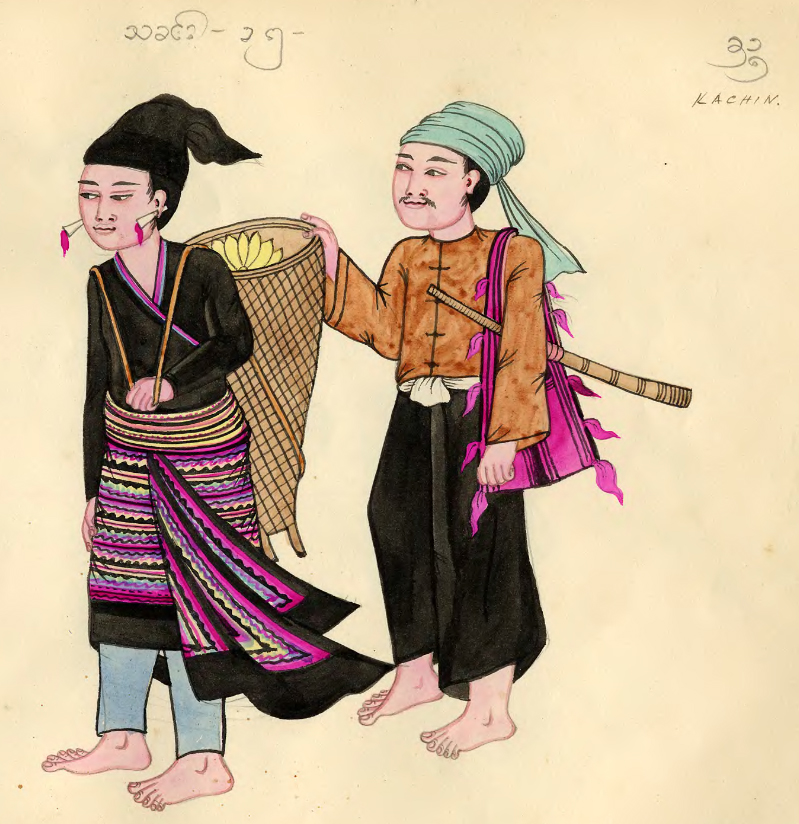
A Burmese depiction of the Kachin people in the early 1900s

The Hukawng Kachins participated in the First Anglo-Burmese War of 1824, and they captured Assamese people to keep as slaves. These Assamese slaves became the main labour force in the Kachin's agricultural work. Some of these slaves were sold to the triangle regions, while others were absorbed into the Kachin fold. Six thousand Kachin soldiers were included when Myanmar marched to Assam and Manipur in 1818. Even after the retreat of Burma, the Kachins continued to attack by using their slaves to fight for them. Following the Anglo-Singpho agreement of 1826, the British freed 6000 slaves. The British paid the Kachin chiefs (Du-was) the fees.

During the 1890s, the British encountered significant resistance when attempting to take over the Kachin hills. Although the Kachin, lacking firearm supplies, were quickly defeated, their martial traditions were noted by British colonial administrators. Beginning in 1897, Kachins were enlisted and gradually subdued by being incorporated into the British armed forces and police. The British started replacing ethnic Burmans in the military with Chin, Kachin, and Karen soldiers. This exclusion of ethnic Burmans from the British military was formally adopted in 1925 when policy was written only allowing ethnic minorities to enlist in the army. Due to this change in military composition, many ethnic Burmans began associating the ethnic minorities with British oppression.

During the Second World War, British plans to connect India with China through the Ledo Road relied on the loyalty of the Kachin and other hill peoples towards the British crown. Britain organised irregular forces called the Northern Kachin Levies to fight the Japanese behind the frontline, ambushing Japanese patrols while the road was being built. The number of Kachin who gave their lives to the war effort was a high proportion of the community.

=== Panglong Agreement ===
Following the Japanese invasion of Burma in 1942, many Burmese soldiers rallied together to form the Burmese Independence Army (BIA) and fight against the British alongside the Japanese. The Kachin, however, were recruited by the British and the United States to fight against Japanese forces with the promise of autonomy after the war. Kachin was placed under direct administration of Burma. As a result, the Kachin State was established on 10 January 1947, but the recognition from Rangoon did not include autonomy. In February 1947, Bamar and Kachin leaders participated in the Panglong Agreement alongside the Chins. This initiative was led by Aung San, who sought to unite the ethnic groups to achieve early independence from the British. The intended constitution was meant to empower the Kachin, Chin, and Shan groups with autonomy. Following Aung San's assassination, the intention was displaced, and calls for autonomy were dismissed. Kachin leaders today view the agreement as an unfulfilled obligation that has caused the current grievances.

=== Kachin conflict ===
Flag of the Kachin Independence Army

Following the Chinese Civil War, the Kuomintang remnants occupied the Shan state as the Yunnan Anti-Communist National Salvation Army. This put pressure on the Kachins and aggravated tensions of Kachin leadership. In 1960, Myanmar's President, Ne Win signed a boundary agreement with Zhou Enlai and without consulting the Kachins ceded their territory to China. Some historians argue this to be the turning point for the Kachin uprising. Furthermore, Prime Minister U Nu decided to make Buddhism the state religion of Myanmar in 1961 further creating hostilities with the mainly non-Buddhist Kachins. On 25 October 1960, the Kachin Independence Organisation was established by seven students at Rangoon University to maintain their rights. The Kachin Independence Council met in Lashio, Shan State, on 5 February 1961, which became "Revolution Day," and demanded an independent state free of external interference.

The armed wing of the KIO, the Kachin Independence Army was created by members of the Kachin Rifles who were discriminated against in the Burma Independence Army by Bamar officers. The KIA initially led by veteran soldiers and former soldiers had originally fought in World War Two alongside the allied forced such as the US. Due to the Burmese army's lack of unification and professionalism, the KIA made significant progress and became considered the most successful and organised armed opposition movements in Burma. The Tatmadaw managed to contain some anti-government insurgents and then tried to institute cultural and religious harmonization programs to align populations into Burmese philosophy and beliefs. Schools were nationalized and the Bamar administration seized church assets and changed the language of teaching from English to Burmese.

Prior to the ceasefire in 1994, after 33 years of insurgency, there had been several short-lived truces. These were in 1963, 1972 and 1981. The KIO signed a ceasefire agreement with the State Law and Order Restoration Council (SLORC), ending all military missions instigated by both the Tatmadaw (Myanmar Army) and the KIO. The ceasefire primarily ended military activity but also included stipulations that the Myanmar government fund development projects in Kachin State. At the time of signing, the KIO was facing increased military pressure from the Tatmadaw and decreasing support from foreign actors to continue warfare against the Burmese government. SLORC thus gave the territories are new status as "special regions" with promised specific support for development. This aid however hardly materialized with business opportunities given at most.

Peace agreements were signed with the New Democratic Army - Kachin in Special Region 1 on 15 December 1989, the Kachin Defense Army in Special Region 5, Shan State on 13 January 1991 and 4th Brigade in Special Region 2 on 24 February 1991. The largest faction the KIO signed a ceasefire on 24 February 1994 after months of negotiations in which the government gave more concessions than previously. Point 11 of the KIO Cease Fire Agreement gave hope for autonomy as it had stated that following successful implementation of the first phrase, the second phase will see negotiations of KIO's legal involvement in the new constitution of the Union of Myanmar and resettlement and rehabilitation of KIO members. After the Junta was renamed the State Peace and Development Council in 1997 with a Roadmap to Democracy in 2003, it asked the KIO to wait for political dialogue once the roadmap was achieved.

Similarly following the 1994 ceasefire, the State Law and Order Restoration Council (SLORC) and State Peace and Development Council (SPDC) engaged in land-grabs across the Kachin State. Leveraging weak land governance policies, SLORC and SPDC invited foreign actors to invest in mining, logging, dam construction, and other infrastructure projects in lands traditionally owned by Kachin People. Furthermore, the Kachin State is rich in natural resources, particularly jade, which the Tatmadaw (Myanmar Army) and KIO fight for control over. Throughout the late 1900s and early 2000s, the Tatmadaw established military presence in areas designated for commercial development, eroding the control of land under the governance of the KIO.

Prior to the 2010 elections, the Tatmadaw implored government officials to covert the KIA, along with other ethnic insurgent groups, into militia forces under the jurisdiction of the Tatmadaw. The order stemmed from a military-drafted 2008 Constitution mandating all armed forces surrender their weapons, fall under the central authority of the Tatmadaw, and rebrand as Border Guard Forces (BGF). The KIO refused to transform into a BGF and instead provided a counter-proposal which would rebrand the KIA as the Kachin Regional Guard Force (KRGF). The proposal was rejected by the Burmese military.

In 2010, KIA commanders indicated an army 10,000 strong with another 10,000 in reserves. Both the KIO and KIA are funded with the trade of jade, timber, and other raw materials with China.

=== 2011–2013 conflict in Kachin State ===
Following the 2011 election of Thein Sein as President of Myanmar additional ceasefires were signed with many of the largest ethnic armed organizations (EAOs) signaling reconciliation. However, on 9 June 2011, Tatmadaw forces broke the 17-year ceasefire and launched an armed offensive against the KIO along the Taping River near a hydroelectric plant. During the attack, Tatmadaw forces abducted KIO Lance Corporal Chang Ying only to return his tortured body days later. The move prompted retaliation from KIO and began a series of deadly skirmishes between the two.

Ongoing conflict between the KIA and Tatmadaw has led to a large-scale refugee crisis with over 100,000 Kachin people displaced. These internally displaced people (IDPs) often attempt to cross the border into neighbouring China. In 2011, however, Kachin IDPs were forcibly sent back to Myanmar and denied refugee status by the Chinese government. This lack of recognition as refugees or asylum seekers has forced many Kachin peoples to form large IDP camps in Myanmar. Only IDP camps in Tatmadaw controlled areas, however, are provided access to UN convoys and international aid. International actors attempting to provide aid in KIA controlled areas are often denied access by the Myanmar government on the basis of security.

By 2012 fighting between KIA and Tatmadaw forces escalated to all regions of the Kachin state. After multiple rounds of discussion, President Thein Sein declared a temporary ceasefire in May 2013 against the desires of Tatmadaw commanders on the ground. By the end of the two year conflict, an estimated 100,000 Kachin people were displaced.

Military situation in Myanmar as of 4 May 2025

Amid the ongoing conflict, the Kachin peoples have been particularly vulnerable to human trafficking. The Tatmadaw and KIA have committed human rights violations against the Kachin peoples, including rape and sexual assault, extrajudicial killings, forced labor, torture, physical abuse, and many other forms of discrimination or outright violence. KIA has In 2014, the Women's League of Burma documented over 100 rapes in Kachin State. In another incident, a Kachin civilian was tortured and subsequently forced to guide Tatmadaw soldiers through combat areas in the Mansi Township.

=== Disillusionment with KIO ===
Members of the Jingpo subgroup dominate the top ranks of the KIO and KIA. Over the decades, members of several Kachin subgroups have splintered from KIA and formed their own ethnic armed organisations, including the Lacid-led Kachin Border Guard Force (previously the New Democratic Army – Kachin); the Rawang Khawnglanghpu militia, and the Lisu and Lhaovo People's Militias.

== Culture and traditions ==
Sociocultural convergence over centuries of contact among Kachin subgroups has led to the rise of a shared "public sphere." In the early 20th century, Christianity drove the development of a common Kachin identity, mirroring what happened with the Karen peoples. Many Kachin subgroups now share marriage and burial rituals, an overarching clan and kinship system, common cultural traditions, religion, and myths of common origin and descent, particularly among the Jingpo, Lawngwaw, Lachick and Zaiwa subgroups. By contrast, the Lisu and Rawang peoples remain at the periphery of a pan-Kachin identity; both groups assert a distinct identity and often contest their presence in the Kachin category.

Kachin society has an intricate kinships system, with it being customary to introduce one's clans and relations so that a newcomer can establish their relations. This custom helps keep Kachin society cohesive by establishing personal relationships with a new Kachin stranger quickly and strongly. The Kachin are one of the few ethnic groups within Myanmar who traditionally have last names. Kachin families are grouped into htinggaw (household) within patrilineal clans called amyu. The extended family is viewed through mayu- lineages from which one's clan can ask for wives- and dama- lineages to which one's clan can give wives. The mayu and dama lie at the heart of the Kachin kinship structure for marriage considerations. In modern times, the increased population and distant disapora has this system has evolved with certain sub-lineages within the same clan considered distinct enough to be marriageable.

The Kachin peoples are traditionally known for their disciplined fighting skills, complex clan inter-relations, craftsmanship, herbal healing and jungle survival skills. The Kachin peoples are distinguished from their lowland counterparts, the Shan peoples, as the former are highlanders who traditionally practice slash-and-burn agriculture in non-irrigated fields.

=== Religion ===
Traditional Kachin religion was a form of animism, practicising sacrifices to a number of nats- both evil and benevolent. The Kachin had a notion of a creator deity known variously as Karai Kasang, Nhpan Wa, Ning Sang or Chye Wa Ningchyang- but did not provide any offerings to him as he was thought to be benevolent. The Kachin belief system revolved less around providing offering to benevolent deities and towards using sacrifices to ward off the evil deities. Unlike other Southeast Asian groups, the Kachin lack an ancestor cult but make offerings motivated by fear of spiritual retaliation.

In Jinghpaw animism, there is no exhaustive list of nats, and estimates range from around 160 to 22, with only 22 recorded in detail. The nat according to the Dehong Jingpo are divided into celestial sky spirits, earth spirits and ancestral spirits. Mu nat is the most powerful celestial, Shadip nat is the most powerful earth spirit and Madai nat is the strongest ancestral nat. Wild spirits are connected to misfortune, sickness and death, while domestic spirits routinely "bite" the living when taking offence.

American Baptist missionary Josiah Cushing, led a mission based in Bhamo to convert the Kachin in the 1870s. The first recorded Kachin baptism took place in 1882 and Damau Naw became the first Kachin pastor. In recent decades, the Kachin have abandoned animist and Buddhist beliefs in favour of Christianity. Various sources estimate that between approximately two-thirds to 90-95% of the Kachin peoples identify as Christians, particularly as Baptists and Catholics. Many animist rituals, such as the annual Manau festival in Myitkyina, are celebrated as folk traditions. Many Kachin profess a belief in evil and good spirits (see nat and phi), including a merciful spirit called Karai Kasang. The Kachin also have spirit intermediaries that make offerings, mediate and perform animal sacrifices.

=== Cuisine ===
Kachin cuisine is typified by its use of cold-climate ingredients like potatoes, wild game (e.g., venison and wild boar), and foraged herbs and vegetables. The traditional staple is rice, which is traditionally cultivated in hillside fields.

== Languages ==
The Kachin peoples speak a diverse set of Tibeto-Burman languages, with Jingpo as a common lingua franca. The Zaiwa, Lhaovo, Lacid, and Lisu peoples all speak Lolo-Burmese languages, while the Jingpo speak a Sal language, and the Rawang speak a Rung language. Jingpo is more closely related to Tibeto-Burman languages spoken in northeastern India, like the Northern Naga languages, and has a number of dialects, including Gauri, Hkahku, Duleng, Turung, and Numhpuk. Zaiwa, Lhaovo, and Lacid are closely related to the Burmese language.

Jingpo has significantly influenced the lexico-semantics of Zaiwa, Lhaovo, and Lacid, and to a lesser extent, Rawang and Lisu.

Multilingualism is common among the Kachin, and many Kachin speak one or more of the Kachin languages, in addition to Burmese in Myanmar, Standard Chinese in China, Assamese in India, and Shan as a trade language.

== See also ==
- Kachin Independence Organisation
- Jingpo people

== Sources ==
=== Books ===
- Hanson, Ola (1913). The Kachins, Their Customs and Traditions. Rangoon: American Baptist Mission Press.
- Hlaing., Ganesan, N. (Narayanan), 1958- Kyaw Yin (2007). Myanmar : state, society, and ethnicity. Institute of Southeast Asian Studies. ISBN 978-981-230-434-6. OCLC 124063677.
- Jaquet, Carine (2015). The Kachin Conflict. Institut de recherche sur l’Asie du Sud-Est contemporaine.
- Lintner, Bertil (1997). The Kachin: Lords of Burma's Northern Frontier. Asia Film House. ISBN 1876437057.
- Ting, Shichyang Zung (2018). Animistic Religious Traditions of the Kachins: Origins and Development (PDF). Myitkinna: Naushawng Development Institute.
- Leach, Edmund (1954). Political Systems of Highland Burma: A study of Kachin Social Structure. London: The Athlone Press.
- Wang, Zhusheng (1997). The Jingpo: Kachin of the Yunnan Plateau. Program for Southeast Asian Studies.
- Nawng, Kawlu Ma (1944). The history of the Kachins of the Hukawng Valley. Burma: Burma Frontier Service.

=== Journals ===
- Kipgen, Nehginpao (2015). "Ethnic Nationalities and the Peace Process in Myanmar". Social Research: An International Quarterly. 82 (2): 399–425. doi:10.1353/sor.2015.0027. ISSN 1944-768X.

=== Thesis ===
- Nan, Kaw (2013). Institution of Kachin Du-Waship (1852-1930). University of Mandaly (Doctor of History thesis). Mandaly: UNiversity of Mandaly.
