= Lhao Vo language =

Burmish language

Lhao Vo
- Maru
- Native to: Myanmar, China
- Native speakers: (100,000 cited 1997)
- Language family: Sino-Tibetan: (Tibeto-Burman); Lolo–Burmese; Burmish; Maruic; Lhao Vo
- Writing system: Latin

Language codes
- ISO 639-3: mhx
- Glottolog: maru1249

Lhaovo (the Burmese name: လော်ဝေါ်), also known as Maru (မရူ) and Langsu (the Chinese name: 浪速), is a Burmish language spoken in Myanmar (Burma) and by a few thousand speakers in China.

== Distribution ==
Dai Qingxia (2005:3) reports 5,600 Langsu speakers in China. Many thousands more are dispersed across the eastern edge of Kachin State, Myanmar. In Myanmar, they are primarily focused around Chipwi township.

- Luxi City: Yingpan Township (ယင်းဖန်မြို့နယ်, 营盘乡)
- Lianghe County: Mengyang Township (မယ်ညန့်နယ်, 养乡)
- Longchuan County: Bangwai Township (ဖန်ဝိုင်မြို့နယ်, 邦外乡) and Jingkan Township (ကျင်ခန်မြို့နယ်, 景坎乡)

The Langsu people call themselves lɔ̃³¹vɔ³¹ (Chinese: Lang'e 浪峨)

== Varieties ==
The standard Lhaovo dialect is that of the Dago’ (tăkoʔ) hill area, on the east side of N'Mai River valley in Kachin State.

Sawada (2017) lists the following patois (subvarieties) of Lhaovo.

- Gyanno’ (autonym: kjɛn35 noʔ21): spoken in the west side of the N'Mai River in Sawlaw Township.
- Tho’lhang (autonym: tʰaʔ21 lo̰22): spoken in Htawlang and a few other villages in northern Sawlaw Township.
- Lakin (autonym: lăkɛ̰22): spoken in Lakin village, northern Sawlaw Township.
- Lhangsu (autonym: la̰ŋ53 su53; not the same as Langsu 浪速 of Yunnan): spoken in the area between Hkrang Hka and Sanin Hka, which are two tributaries of the Mali Hka. It is spoken in Sumprabum Township, including in the villages of Hting Tsa, N-gawk Hkyet, and Ma Awng.

=== Langsong ===
The Langsong (浪宋) are found in Zaoyang (早阳) in Yunlong County (in the Chinese province of Yunnan) as well as in Baocun (表村), Laomo (老末), and Sancha (三岔). They reportedly speak a highly endangered language that may be possibly related to Langsu.

== Phonology ==
=== Consonants ===
Lhao Vo has the following consonant sounds:

		Labial		Dental/ Alveolar	Post- alveolar	Palatal	Velar		Glottal
		plain	pal.	Dental/ Alveolar	Post- alveolar	Palatal	plain	pal.	Glottal
Plosive	voiceless	p	pʲ	t			k	kʲ	(ʔ)
Plosive	aspirated	pʰ	pʰʲ	tʰ			kʰ	kʰʲ	
Affricate	voiceless			t͡s̪	t͡ʃ				
Affricate	aspirated			t͡s̪ʰ	t͡ʃʰ				
Fricative	voiceless	f		s̪	ʃ		x		
Fricative	voiced	v					ɣ		ɦ
Nasal		m	mʲ	n		ɲ	ŋ		
Tap				ɾ					
Approximant				l		j			

- Sounds /p, t, k, ʔ, m, n, ŋ, j/ can all be heard in final position.
- /ʔ/ is only written in final position.

=== Vowels ===
There is a distinction among creaky vowel sounds:

	Front				Central		Back	
	plain		creaky		plain	creaky	plain	creaky
Close	i		ḭ				u	ṵ
Mid	e	ø	ḛ	ø̰			o	o̰
Open					a	a̰		
Diphthong					au	a̰ṵ		

- /i, ḭ/ can also range to [ɪ, ɪ̰].
- Vowels /e, o/ when preceding a word-final /-ŋ/ can also be heard as nasalized [ẽ, õ].

When preceding a final glide /-j/, each vowel has the following allophones:

Phoneme	Allophones
/aj/	[aɪ̆], [ɛ]
/auj/	[auɪ̆], [ɔɪ̆]
/uj/	[uɪ̆], [ʉ], [ʉɪ̆]
/ej/	[əɪ̆]

=== Tones ===
Lhao Vo has three lexical tones: high, low and falling. Low tone may be a different analysis of creaky vowels. In Latin script, falling tone is unmarked, e.g. ⟨lo⟩ etc.; low tone is ⟨lo꞉⟩ etc., and high tone is ⟨loˮ⟩ etc. (or ⟨lobʼ⟩ etc. with a final b, d, g). Final glottal stop is written ⟨lo,⟩ etc. in falling tone, ⟨lo;⟩ etc. in low tone, and ⟨loʼ⟩ in high tone.
