= Chibwe =

Chibwe may refer to:

- Chipwi (also Chibwe), a town in Kachin State
  - Chibwe Township, a township in Kachin State
  - Chibwe Dam, a dam on the N'Mai River in Kachin State
  - Chibwe Creek Dam, a dam on the N'Mai River
  - Chibwe Creek, a river in Kachin State, Burma (Myanmar)

- Chibwe, Zambia, a township in Zambia
- Chileshe Chibwe, a Zambian football (soccer) player
