= Hsawlaw =

Hsawlaw ဆော့လော် Tsawlaw
- Location in Burma
- Coordinates: 26°09′15″N 98°16′13″E
- Country: Myanmar
- Division: Kachin State
- District: Myitkyina District
- Township: Sawlaw Township

Population
  - Total: 368
  - Religions: Buddhism
- Time zone: UTC+6.30 (MST)

Hsawlaw or Tsawlaw (Burmese: ဆော့လော်) is the smallest town in Kachin State, Myanmar. It is also the third smallest municipality in the whole country. The placename is likely derived from the Lhaovo words meaning "hard to breathe".

== Myanmar civil war ==
On 2 October 2024, the Kachin Independence Army (KIA) captured Hsawlaw from the junta-aligned New Democratic Army Kachin (NDA-K) Border Guard Force (BGF) after four days of fighting.
