= Rgangkum =

Rgangkum may refer to:

- Rgangkum, Chipw, Kachin State, Burma
- Rgangkum, Hsawlaw, Kachin State, Burma
