= Wulang =

Wulang may refer to:

- Wulang, Myanmar, a village
- Wulang, Tibet, a village
- Gorou (Chinese: 五郎, Pinyin: Wǔláng), a Genshin Impact character
