= Lasin =

Lasin may refer to:

- Łasin, a town in Kuyavian-Pomeranian Voivodeship, Poland
- Lasin, Chipwi, a settlement in Chipwi Township, Kachin State, Burma
