= Shimao (disambiguation) =

Shimao is a Neolithic archaeological site in Shaanxi, China.

Shimao may also refer to

- Shimao, Chipwi, a village in northern Burma
- Shimao Station, a railway station in the city of Himi in Toyama Prefecture, Japan
- Shimao Group, a property development company in Shanghai
- Shinzō Shimao (born 1948), Japanese photographer
- Toshio Shimao (1917–1986), Japanese novelist
- Zhu Shimao (born 1954), Chinese comedian, sketch actor, and actor
