= Tamtu =

Tamtu may refer to:

- Tiamat, Babylonian goddess
- Tamtu, Burma
