= Kyee Shin =

Kyee Shin ကျီးရှင် Cheshen
- Location in Burma
- Coordinates: 26°08′05″N 98°17′06″E
- Country: Burma
- State: Kachin State
- District: Myitkyina District
- Township: Hsawlaw Township

Population
  - Religions: Buddhism
- Time zone: UTC+6.30 (UTC + 6:30)

Kyee Shin is a village in Hsawlaw Township in Myitkyina District in the Kachin State of north-eastern Burma.
