= Ka Nawt =

Ka Nawt ကနော့ Kanaw
- Location in Burma
- Coordinates: 26°5′N 98°18′E
- Country: Burma
- State: Kachin State
- District: Chipwi District
- Township: Hsawlaw Township

Population
  - Religions: Buddhism
- Time zone: UTC+6.30 (UTC + 6:30)

Kan Nawt is a village in Hsawlaw Township in Chipwi District in the Kachin State of north-eastern Burma.
