= Ma Hkawng Dam =

Maw Hkawng Dam မခေါင်ဒမ်း Mahkung-adam
- Location in Burma
- Coordinates: 26°49′06″N 98°34′51″E
- Country: Burma
- State: Kachin State
- District: Myitkyina District
- Township: Hsawlaw Township

Population
  - Religions: Buddhism
- Time zone: UTC+6.30 (UTC + 6:30)

Maw Hkawng Dam is a village in Hsawlaw Township in Myitkyina District in the Kachin State of north-eastern Burma.
