= Mansan =

Mansan may refer to:

- Mansan, Burma
- Mansan, Hautes-Pyrénées, a commune in the Hautes-Pyrénées department in France
- Mān San, Burma
- Mānsān, Burma
- Mansan River, a tributary of the Maicasagi River, in Québec, Canada
