= So Htay Ni =

Burmese politician

- ဆော်ထီနီ

Member of the Pyithu Hluttaw
- Incumbent
- Assumed office 5 January 2021
- Constituency: Hsawlaw Township

Personal details
- Born: 14 December 1986 (age 39) Kachin State, Myanmar
- Party: National League for Democracy
- Occupation: Politician

So Hat Ni (Burmese: ဆော်ထီနီ) is a Burmese politician who currently serves as a Pyithu Hluttaw MP for Hsawlaw Township.

== Political career ==
He is a member of the National League for Democracy. In the 2020 Myanmar general election, he was elected as a Pyithu Hluttaw MP and the elected representative for the Hsawlaw Township parliamentary constituency.
