= Talam =

Talam may refer to:

- Talam, Burma
- Talam, Iran or Jalam
- Citalopram, an antidepressant drug
- Kue talam, Indonesian traditional tray cake

== See also ==
- Jala (disambiguation)
- Jalam (film), a 2016 Indian film
