= Matao =

Matao may refer to:

== Places ==
- Matão, a municipality in São Paulo, Brazil
- Matao, Burma, a village in Kachin State, Burma
- Matao, Chipwi, village in Kachin State, Burma
- Kum Ga or Matao, a settlement in Kachin State, Burma

== Other uses ==
- Matao Herrera (1984), a mass shooting in San Diego, California, U.S.
- Matao, the ruling caste of the traditional Chamorro people
