= Lanse =

Village in Kachin State, Myanmar

Lar Chin လာချင် Laching, Lanse (လန်ဆယ်)
- Location in Myanmar
- Coordinates: 26°34′35″N 98°34′05″E
- Country: Myanmar
- State: Kachin State
- District: Myitkyina District
- Township: Hsawlaw Township
- Time zone: UTC+6.30 (UTC + 6:30)

Lanse (Burmese: လန်ဆယ်, officially called Laching or Lar Chin (Burmese: လာချင်) is a village in Hsawlaw Township in Myitkyina District in the Kachin State of north-eastern Myanmar.

The village was home to the Kachin Border Guard Force Battalion 1002 headquarters under the command of the New Democratic Army – Kachin (NDA-K). The outpost was captured by the Kachin Independence Army on 11 November 2024 during the Myanmar civil war. Earlier in October 2024, the NDA-K issued an order to close mining operations including gold and rare earth mining sites in their territory, including Lanse.
