= La Hsin =

La Hsin လစင်း Lasin
- Location in Burma
- Coordinates: 26°02′26″N 98°16′34″E
- Country: Myanmar
- State: Kachin State
- District: Myitkyina District
- Township: Hsawlaw Township
- Time zone: UTC+6.30 (UTC + 6:30)

La Hsin is a settlement in Chipwi Township, Kachin State, Burma.
