= Chi Win =

Chi Win ခြီဝင်း Chhiving
- Location in Burma
- Coordinates: 26°33′49″N 98°34′34″E
- Country: Burma
- State: Kachin State
- District: Myitkyina District
- Township: Hsawlaw Township

Population
  - Religions: Buddhism
- Time zone: UTC+6.30 (UTC + 6:30)

Chi Win is a village in Hsawlaw Township in Myitkyina District in the Kachin State of northeastern Burma.
