= Yindam =

- Location in Burma
- Coordinates: 25°42′N 98°05′E
- Country: Burma
- State: Kachin State
- District: Myitkyina District
- Township: Chipwi Township

Population
  - Religions: Buddhism
- Time zone: UTC+6.30 (UTC + 6:30)

Yindam is a village in Chipwi Township in Myitkyina District in the Kachin State of north-eastern Burma.
