= Chaung Dam =

Chaung Dam ခြောင်ဒမ် Chon Dam (ချုံဒမ်), Chawngdam
- Location in Burma
- Coordinates: 26°42′27″N 98°22′48″E
- Country: Burma
- State: Kachin State
- District: Myitkyina District
- Township: Hsawlaw Township

Population (2005)
  - Religions: Buddhism
- Time zone: UTC+6.30 (UTC + 6:30)

Chaung Dam is a village in Hsawlaw Township in Myitkyina District in the Kachin State of north-eastern Burma.
