= Kan Kon =

Kan Kon ကန်ကုန် Kangkung
- Location of Kangkung in Myanmar
- Coordinates: 26°36′N 98°35′E
- Country: Myanmar
- State: Kachin State
- District: Myitkyina District
- Township: Hsawlaw Township

Population
  - Religions: Buddhism
- Time zone: UTC+6.30 (UTC + 6:30)

Kan Kon is a village in Hsawlaw Township in Myitkyina District in the Kachin State of north-eastern Myanmar.

== Climate ==
The climate of Kangkung is humid subtropical highland climate(Köppen climate classification Cwb). Temperatures are very pleasant throughout the year. There are only a few days above 30 °C in summer.
