= Yingying =

Yingying may refer to:

- Yingying, Myanmar, village in Hsawlaw Township, Myitkyina District, Kachin State
- Yingying, one of the five Fuwas
- Yingying Pagoda, in Yongji County, Shanxi province, China, named after the fictional character Cui Yingying (see below)

== Given names ==
Yingying or Ying Ying is also the atonal romanization of several Chinese given names, usually for females.

- Cui Yingying, fictional character
  - "Yingying's Biography"
- Yingying Zhang (victim) (1990–2017)
  - Finding Yingying, 2020 American documentary film
- Bao Yingying (born 1983), Chinese sabre fencer
- Duan Yingying (born 1989), Chinese tennis player
- Guan Yingying (born 1995), Chinese ice hockey player
- Han Yingying (born 1986), Chinese Taekwondo practitioner
- Li Yingying (cricketer) (born c.1991), Chinese cricketer
- Li Yingying (volleyball) (born 2000), Chinese volleyball player
- Lee Ying Ying (born 1997), Malaysian badminton player
- Zhang Yingying (table tennis) (born 1983), Chinese table tennis player
- Zhang Yingying (runner) (born 1990), Chinese long-distance runner
- Zhao Yingying (born 1986), Chinese pole vaulter
- He Ying Ying (born 1995), Singaporean actress
- Hui Ying-Ying (1928–1993), Chinese actress
- Lan Yingying (born 1990), Chinese actress
- Qian Yingying, ceramic artist
- Yingying Fan, statistician
- Yingying Chen, computer scientist
