= Hkrangkao =

- Location in Burma
- Coordinates: 26°19′N 98°20′E
- Country: Burma
- State: Kachin State
- District: Myitkyina District
- Township: Hsawlaw Township

Population
  - Religions: Buddhism
- Time zone: UTC+6.30 (UTC + 6:30)

Hkrangkao is a village in Hsawlaw Township in Myitkyina District in the Kachin State of north-eastern Burma.

== History ==
In early 1912 Hkrangkao was visited by Captain B. E. A. Pritchard while undertaking exploration work in Northern Burma. Pritchard observed the local farming practices while the country was undergoing a crop failure, with up to six crops in each field and Caryota urens planted to be consumed to avert famines.
