= Painaw =

Painaw may refer to:

- Painavu, Kerala, India
- Painaw, Myanmar
