= Hpa Re =

Hpa re ဖရဲ Hpare
- Location in Burma
- Coordinates: 25°50′N 98°25′E
- Country: Burma
- State: Kachin State
- District: Myitkyina District
- Township: Chipwi Township

Population
  - Religions: Buddhism
- Time zone: UTC+6.30 (UTC + 6:30)

Hpa re is a village tract in Chipwi Township in Myitkyina District in the Kachin State of north-eastern Burma, it contains the villages of Ah Htet Hpa Re, Auk Hpa Re and Hpa Re Waw Jang. As of 2024 it was under the control of the Kachin Independence Army.
