= Sanyu =

Sanyu may refer to:

== Places ==
- Sanyu, Chipwi, Burma
- Sanyu Township, Gansu, China

== People ==
- Sanyu (painter) (1901–1966), Chinese-French painter
- Cinderella Sanyu (born 1985), Ugandan musician
- Jemimah Sanyu (born 1986), Ugandan musician, performer, producer, and voice coach

== Television ==
- Sanyu (TV series)
- Sanyu Television, a defunct Ugandan television channel

== See also ==
- San Yu (1918–1996), Burmese general and President of Burma
