= Neya =

Neya may refer to:

- Neya (town), Kostroma Oblast, Russia
- Neya (river), Kostroma Oblast, Russia
- Michiko Neya, Japanese voice actress
- Neya, a character from the anime Infinite Ryvius

== See also ==
- Neya Chiefdom, a chiefdom of Sierra Leone
- Neeya (disambiguation)
- Naya (disambiguation)
