= Ga Lam Dan =

Ga Lam Dan ဂလမ်ဒန်း Gawlamten
- Location in Burma
- Coordinates: 26°1′N 98°36′E
- Country: Burma
- State: Kachin State
- District: Myitkyina District
- Township: Chipwi Township

Population
  - Religions: Buddhism
- Time zone: UTC+6.30 (UTC + 6:30)

Ga Lam Dan is a village in Chipwi Township in Myitkyina District in the Kachin State of north-eastern Burma. The village is predominantly inhabited by the Kachin people, an ethnic minority group in Myanmar.

According to a report by the Kachin Development Networking Group, Gawlamten was one of the many villages in the Kachin State that were affected by the armed conflict between the Kachin Independence Army (KIA) and the Myanmar Army. The conflict led to the displacement of thousands of civilians in the region, including Gawlamten. Many villagers were forced to flee their homes and seek refuge in nearby towns and cities. In 2018, the Myanmar government and the KIA signed a ceasefire agreement, which has led to some improvements in the situation in the region. However, the ceasefire has been fragile, and sporadic clashes between the two sides have continued.
