= Pa Na =

Pa Na may refer to:

- Pa Na language, a Hmongic language of Hunan, China
- Pa-na, a village in Burma

== See also ==
- Pana (disambiguation)
