= La Kin =

La Kin လကင် Lakin
- Location in Burma
- Coordinates: 26°35′56″N 98°23′57″E
- Country: Burma
- State: Kachin State
- District: Myitkyina District
- Township: Hsawlaw Township

Population
  - Religions: Buddhism
- Time zone: UTC+6.30 (UTC + 6:30)

La Kin is a village in Hsawlaw Township in Myitkyina District in the Kachin State of north-eastern Burma.
