= Mān San =

Mān San is the name of two settlements in Shan State, Burma.

- One is located at 23°16′N 98°02′E
- One is located at 22°32′N 98°11′E

== See also ==
- Mansan (disambiguation)
- Mānsān
