= Tamtu, Myanmar =

- Location in Myanmar
- Coordinates: 26°4′N 98°9′E
- Country: Myanmar
- State: Kachin State
- District: Myitkyina District
- Township: Chipwi Township

Population
  - Religions: Buddhism
- Time zone: UTC+6.30 (UTC + 6:30)

Tamtu, Myanmar is a village in Chipwi Township in Myitkyina District in the Kachin State of north-eastern Myanmar.
