= Mānsān =

Settlement in Myanmar

Coordinates: 22°40′N 96°56′E

Mānsān is a settlement in Shan State, Burma.

== See also ==
- Mansan (disambiguation)
- Mān San
