= Neeya =

Neeya may refer to:

- Neeya?, a 1979 Indian fantasy film
  - Neeya 2, its 2019 sequel
- Neeya, a Singaporean-Indian TV series
- Neya (ネーヤ, Nēya, Neeya) character from Infinite Ryvius anime series

== See also ==
- Neya (disambiguation)
- Niya (disambiguation)
