= Niya =

Niya may refer to:

- Niya (mythology), a Polish deity of the underworld
- Niya County or Minfeng County, Hotan Prefecture, Xinjiang, China
  - Niya Town, the seat of Niya/Minfeng County in Hotan Prefecture, Xinjiang, China
  - Niya ruins, an archaeological site in Minfeng County, Xinjiang, China
- Niya Kingdom, a kingdom in Mesopotamia

== People with the surname ==
- Yab Niya (born 1994), Indian cricketer

== People with the given name ==
- Niya Butts (born 1978), American women’s college basketball coach

== Music ==
- "Niya", a 2020 song by Manal
- "Niya", a 2023 song by rappers Nahir and ElGrandeToto

== See also ==
- Neeya (disambiguation)
