= Naya =

Naya may refer to:

== People ==
=== Given name ===
- Naya (singer), (born 1992), Lebanese singer
- Naya Ali, Canadian rapper
- Naya Bienstock (born 2001), Israeli actress
- Naya Raj Pant (1913–2002), Nepalese polymath
- Naya Rivera (1987–2020), American actress and singer
- Naya Tapper (born 1994), American rugby union player
- Naya Vialva (born 2001), American soccer player

=== Surname ===
- Beverly Naya (born 1989), British-Nigerian actress
- Carlo Naya (1816–1882), Italian photographer
- Gorō Naya (納谷 悟朗; 1929–2013), Japanese voice actor
- José Naya (1896–1977), Uruguayan footballer
- José Antonio Naya (1934–2024), Spanish football manager
- Kōki Naya (納谷 幸喜; 1940–2013), birth name of Taihō Kōki, Japanese sumo wrestler
- Rokurō Naya (納谷 六朗; 1932–2014), Japanese voice actor
- Yukio Naya (納谷幸男; born 1994), Japanese professional wrestler

== Other uses ==
- Naya, Myanmar
- Naya River, in Colombia
- Naya Waters, a Canadian water bottler
- Naya, a 1982 album by Congolese musician King Kester Emeneya
- Naya, a concept in Jainism; see Anekantavada
- Nāya, the ancient Indo-Aryan tribe in which the Jain Tirthankara Mahavira was born
- NAYA, a fast-casual restaurant chain serving customizable Middle Eastern bowls, rolls, and salads
