= Chipwi District =

District in Kachin State, Myanmar

Chipwi District ချီဖွေခရိုင်
- Chipwi District (Red) in Kachin State.
- Coordinates: 26.059°N 98.32°E
- Country: Myanmar
- State: Kachin State
- Capital: Chipwi
- Time zone: MMT

Chipwi District (Burmese: ချီဖွေခရိုင်) is a district in Kachin State, Myanmar. It was split from Myitkyina District on 30 April 2022 and contains two townships. Its district seat is Chipwi.

== Townships ==
Townships in Chipwi District:

- Chipwi Township
- Hsawlaw Township

== Borders ==
Chipwi District borders:

- Putao District of Kachin State to the north;
- Myitkyina District of Kachin State to the west;
- Yunnan Province of China to the east and south.
