= Chipwi Township =

Coordinates: 25.8833°N 98.1333°E

Chipwi Township ချီဖွေမြို့နယ်
- Township
- Location in Chipwi district (in red)
- Country: Myanmar
- State: Kachin State
- District: Chipwi District
- Capital: Chipwi
- Time zone: UTC+6:30 (MMT)

Chipwi Township (Burmese: ချီဖွေမြို့နယ်; Chibwe Township) is a township of Chipwi District in the Kachin State of Burma. The principal town is Chipwi. It was formerly part of Myitkyina District.

== Geography ==
Chibwe Township is situated about 60 miles (97 km) from Myitkyina, the capital of Kachin State. The principal river running through the township is the N'Mai River.

=== Towns and villages ===
Akyauk, Atang, Aukan, Awngchit, Ba-le, Bamhkam, Bamyaw, Chechin, Chiglai, Chih-ko, Chikgaw, Chiloi, Chipwi, Chu-iho, Chyangzan, Chyingtaw, Chyinhtaung, Gawlamten, Gawyawm, Hkamkawn, Hkasuhpa, Hkayazahkuso, Hkinchit, Hpala, Hpare, Hpyithpyaw, Htangprai, Htawgaw, Htawmshing, Htingra, Ichake, Ko-hkang, Lagut, Lagwi, La-hok, Laichupo, Lakyawn, Lamuk, Langyang, Laokam, Laotiki, Lasin, La-tai, Lauhkang, La-uho, Laukkam, Lauksauk, Launggyaung, Launghpam, Laungkaw, Lawngkyaw, Lontin, Luchang, Lukpwi, Luksang, Lungpang, Machulo, Magawng, Mang-ai, Mangpyaw, Mangtong, Mansan, Matao, Mukhkaung, Mukkaung, Mukyaw, Mum, Myauknaw, Myukhpyaw, Nahpaung, Nakyam, Nalaw, Nang-u, Napok, Nasup, Nayang, Ngamaw, Ngawagyalaw, Ngawapaka, Ngawlawngtam, Paingmaw, Pammyaw, Pang War, Pangli, Pangmawjang, Pawahku, Pawngen, Pawzang, Pwisang, Pyiloi, Rgangkum, Rgangpi, Ritjaw, Ritpan, Ritsang, Rittong, Rukchaung, Sadulaw, Sanliangho, Sanyu, Saulang, Sawlaw, Sawnkyawn, Sha-an, Shachinpok, Shalaw, Sha-on, Shaotangpa, Shapok, Shapyi, Shijang, Shimao, Shitzaw, Sinhkung, Sipe-hkalaw, Taiawhtu, Talam, Tamna, Tamtu, Tangahka, Tangkyin, Tangtong, Tangtung, Taumangyang, Tawngkaw, Tawung, Theyaw, Tingram, Tsawlang, Tsonma, Tumpyaw, Tunhpaung, Valao, Wachao, Wachutaing, Wachyawn, Wakyang, Wa-na, Wanghte, Wasawng, Washawma, Wasok, Wuhpatu, Wusaohkao, Wutze, Yinchyingpa, Yindam

== Economy ==
The local people produce and sell walnuts, apricots and pickled fruits. Chinese companies are involved with mining in the Panwa area, which is rich in rare minerals. Due to lax mining laws, illegal mining is prevalent in the area.
