= Chipwi =

Chipwi ချီဖွေမြို့ Chibwe
- Location in Myanmar
- Coordinates: 25°53′03″N 98°7′55″E
- Country: Myanmar
- State: Kachin State
- District: Chipwi District
- Township: Chipwi Township
- Elevation: 890 ft (270 m)

Population (2005)
  - Religions: Buddhism
- Time zone: UTC+6.30 (MMT)

Chipwi (Burmese: ချီဖွေမြို့; also called Chibwe) is a town in north-east part of the Kachin State, Myanmar. It is the administrative centre for Chibwe Township and Chipwi District. The town is located beside the N'Mai River just below where Chibwe Creek enters it. The Kachin Independence Army liberated Chipwi town on the evening of 30 September 2024. The Kachin Independence Organization has started controlling civil government operations. The placename is likely derived from the Lashi word for "beeswax".
