= Hsawlaw Township =

Coordinates: 25.9833°N 98.1000°E

Hsawlaw Township ဆော့လောမြို့နယ်
- Township
- Location in Chipwi district (in red)
- Country: Myanmar
- State: Kachin State
- District: Myitkyina District
- Time zone: UTC+6:30 (MST)

Hsawlaw Township (Burmese: ဆော့လောမြို့နယ်) is a township of Chipwi District in the Kachin State of Myanmar. The principal town is Hsawlaw.

== Towns and villages ==
- Ahkawhtawng
- Alawang
- Chawmaw
- Chawngbuk
- Chawngdam
- Chawngrang
- Chebuk
- Cheshen
- Chhachu
- Chhe-hkawng
- Chhiving
- Chili Htu
- Chunaw
- Chyangyu
- Hkabap
- Hkawnkaw
- Hkrangkao
- Hkringmaw
- Hpala
- Hpalawng
- Hpaungja
- Hpongsauk
- Hpyikrang
- Htahte Pam
- Htamtang
- Htaunghpau
- Htawlang
- Jampaw
- Jumja
- Kanaw
- Kanghai
- Kangtung
- Katze
- Khugaung
- Komo
- Kumaw
- Kyipaw
- Kyokha
- Laching
- Lahkam
- Lahpan
- Lajing
- Lakin
- Laktang
- Lakyaw
- Lalong
- Lamchyu
- Laohkam
- Latsawn
- Laukok
- Laukshwe
- Lawngte
- Lawngyaw
- Lawnjepa
- Longlam
- Mage
- Mahkung-adam
- Mangchibuk
- Mangkyi
- Mapili
- Marang Htung
- Mehke
- Mitlam
- Mitnaw
- Mi-yuk
- Myasa
- Myawchawng
- Nahkulaw
- Namyawngbuk
- Naya
- Ngataolungbu
- Pade
- Painaw
- Pakaw
- Pa-na
- Pasai
- Pashe
- Patam
- Pawawnbuk
- Pilao
- Rajawlaw
- Ratma
- Rawng-aw
- Rawngtsaw
- Rgangkum
- Rithtaung
- Ritjawng
- Rityawkyok
- Sachahaw
- Samma-cha
- Saungtaw
- Shangkyok
- Shipyam
- Tabanghka
- Talamtam
- Taungawn
- Tawngawkbuk
- Tsawlaw
- Tsumyaw
- Vawnpayit
- Vulao
- Wahao
- Wapyaw
- Wasukyang
- Wawgrup
- Wawhtung
- Wawmantam
- Wawmi
- Wawmum
- Welatam
- Wulang
- Wusiyachiku
- Wutsok
- Yawjawng
- Yawshaw
- Yingying.
