= Myitkyina District =

District in Kachin, Myanmar

Coordinates: 26°15′N 97°30′E

Myitkyina District (Burmese: မြစ်ကြီးနားခရိုင်) is a district of the Kachin State in northern Burma (Myanmar). The capital lies at Myitkyina. It is the largest district in the country by land area.

Location in Kachin State

== Townships ==
The district contains the following townships:

- Myitkyina Township
- Waingmaw Township
- Injangyang Township
- Tanai Township
- Chipwi Township
- Hsawlaw Township
