= Namwan Assigned Tract =

Namwan Assigned Tract located in the modern map of Yunnan

Detailed map of Namwan Assigned Tract

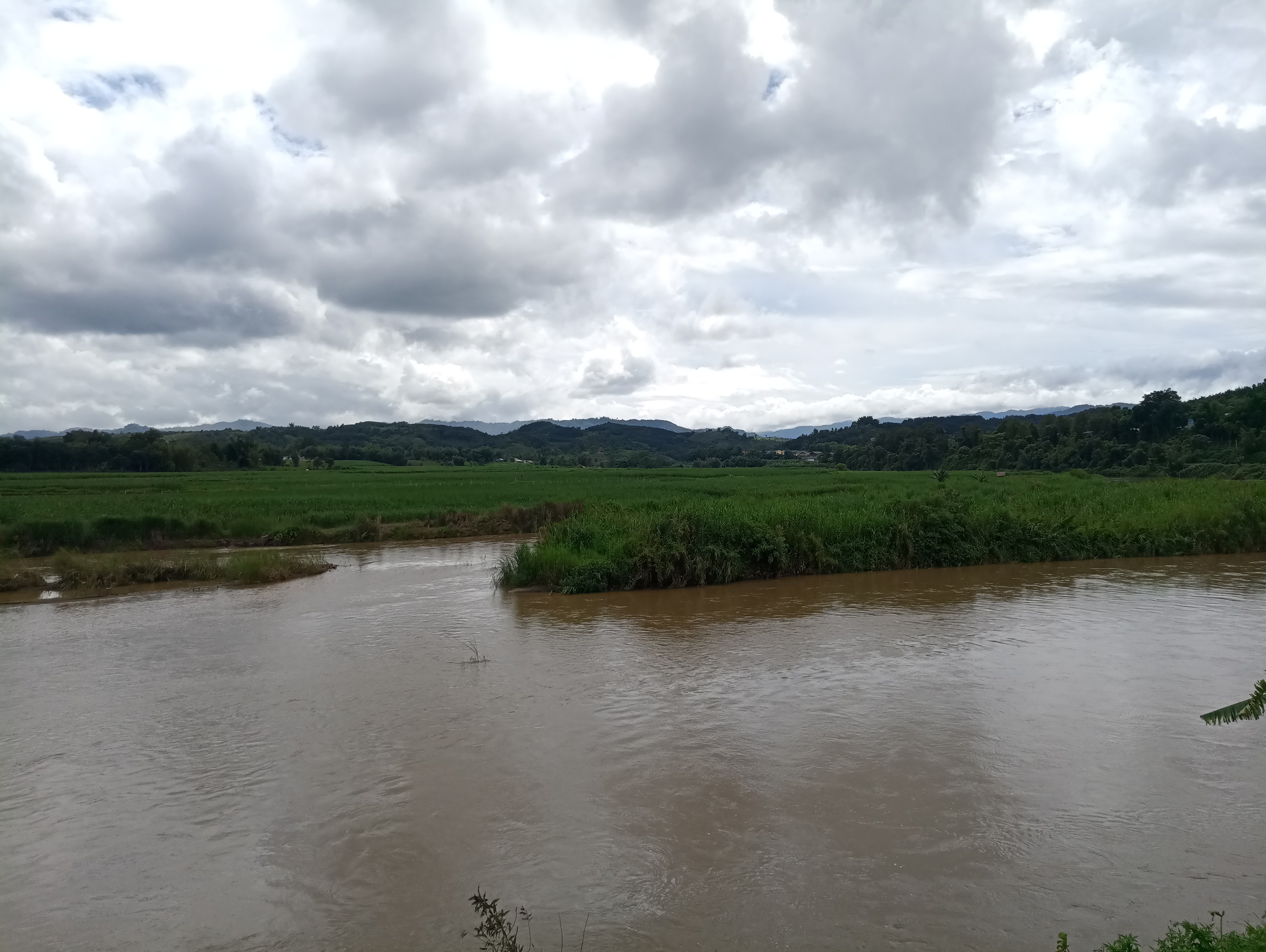
Landscape of Namwan Assigned Tract, took at Namwan River in China

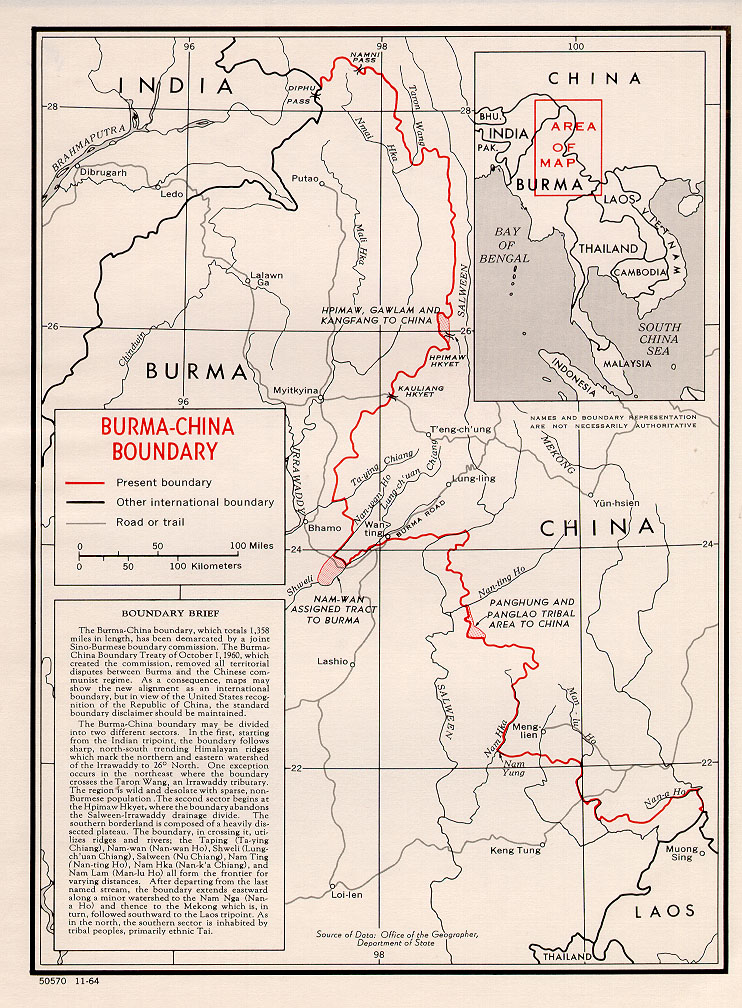
Map showing Namwan assigned to Burma in the 1960 Border Treaty

Namwan Assigned Tract, also known as Meng-Mao Triangular Area, is a 220 km^{2} (85 sq mi) area situated at the junction of the Shweli River and Namwan River in the southern Kachin State of Myanmar. It was a territory of China but was "perpetual leased" to British Burma in 1897, and legally became the territory of Burma in 1961.

== History ==
The British built a road through Namwan Assigned Tract to connect Bhamo and Namhkam before communicating with China, this road became the major road connecting the Kachin State with the Shan State. And Xue Fucheng, the Chinese Ambassador to the UK, required the British to return the road and the area in the meetings during 1892 and 1893. The British refused to return the road, but had to admit the area is part of China. Then UK signed a convention with Qing dynasty in 1894, claimed the area is part of China, but the road was to remain open for British "travellers, commerce and administrative purpose", and Britain had the right to improve the road, as well as, within certain restrictions, to move troops along it.

In 1897, UK signed another convention with Qing dynasty, the Namwan Assigned Tract was recognized "as belonging to China" but "the whole of this area China shall not exercise any jurisdiction or authority whatsoever. The administration and control will be entirely conducted by the British Government, who will hold it on a perpetual lease from China, paying a rent for it, the amount of which shall be fixed hereafter." Britain and China settled the rent at 1,000 Rupee a year in 1901, as compensation for the loss territory of Mengmao Chiefdom.

In 1945, after the Japanese troops retreated to Burma, Ruili Administrative Bureau, the direct control local government of Republic of China, founded "Guangfu (recovery) Township" in Namwan Assigned Tract. Britain protested soon after, and then China's central government command the Ruili bureau to retreat. In 1948, the Republic of China's government refused to accept the annual rent from the new sovereign state, Union of Burma, and later, the People's Republic of China also refused this rent.

Because the existence of a "perpetual lease" is contrary to the dignity of a sovereign state, China and Burma strove to abrogate the "perpetual lease". After series of negotiations, China and Burma signed Sino - Burmese Boundary Agreement on 28 January 1960. Both sides largely agreed to the 1941 boundary line and the Namwan Assigned Tract was to became part of Burma, in exchange for the transfer of Panghung/Banhong and Panglao/Banlao to China, which is located at west of "1941 line". China and Burma appointed joint commission to demarcate the boundary on the transferred area, and the actual size of transferred area was also decided by the joint commission. Finally, Sino-Burmese Boundary Treaty was signed on 1 October 1960, it confirmed that China giving up all claims to the 220 km^{2} (85 sq mi) area of the Namwan Assigned Tract, in exchange for received 189 km^{2} (73 sq mi) of Panghung and Panglao.

Sino-Burmese Boundary Treaty entry into force on 4 January 1961, Namwan Assigned Tract became the territory of Burma legally.

== See also ==
- China–Myanmar border
