= China–Myanmar border =

International border

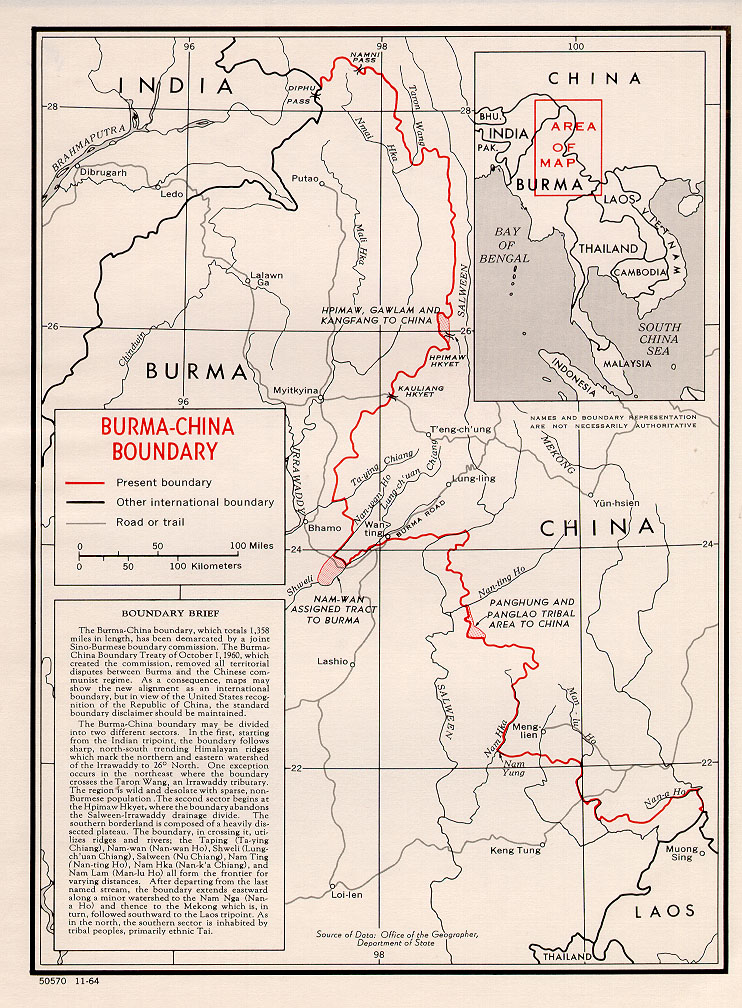
Map of the China-Myanmar border

The China–Myanmar border is the international border between the territory of the People's Republic of China and Myanmar (formerly Burma). The border is 2,129 km (1,323 mi) in length and runs from the tripoint with India in the north to the tripoint with Laos in the south.

== Description ==
The border begins in the north at the tripoint with India just north of the Diphu Pass (Note: The precise location of the tripoint is unclear owing to the ongoing Sino-Indian border dispute.) and then runs briefly north-east, across the Nanmi Pass and Hkakabo Razi (5,881 m), the highest mountain in Southeast Asia. It then turns to the south-east, running broadly south and then south-west across the Hengduan and Gaoligong Mountains via a series of irregular lines. In the vicinity of Ruili the border briefly utilises parts of the Taping and Nanwan rivers, before turning south-east to join the Shweli River, which it utilises for a period towards the north-east. The border then continues through mountainous terrain in a broadly (though often convoluted) south-eastwards direction, occasionally utilising rivers (such as the Nanding and Nam Hka) for short stretches, before following the Mekong River to the tripoint with Laos.

== History ==
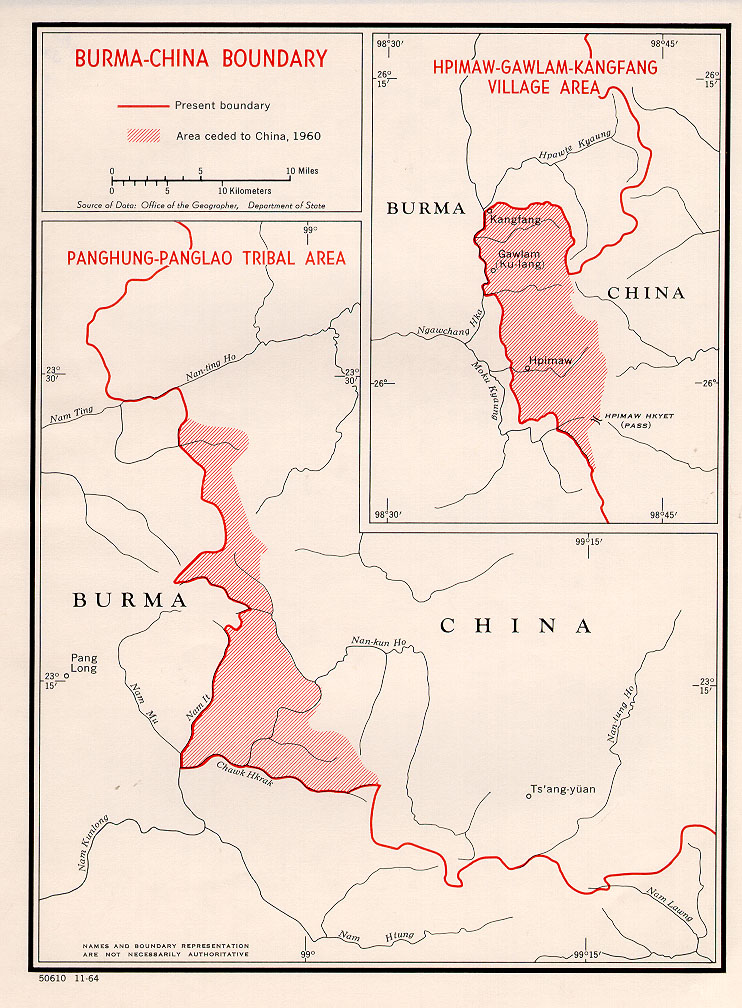
Close-up map of areas ceded to China: Pianma (Hpimaw), Banhong (Panghung) and Banlao (Panglao) townships as a result of the 1960 border treaty

The boundary area is inhabited by non-Han and non-Burmese peoples, and has been traditionally kept as a buffer region between the various Chinese and Burmese empires. During the 19th century the British, based in India, began occupying Myanmar (then referred to as Burma), gradually incorporating it into British India. Their advance close to lands traditionally claimed by China pushed the two sides into negotiating a boundary treaty in 1894, which covered the southern half of the boundary as far north as the vicinity of Myitkyina, exclusive of the Wa States. Sections of this border were demarcated and marked on the ground from 1897 to 1900. In 1941, a border running through the Wa States area was agreed upon following on-the-ground surveys conducted in the 1930s, though no agreement on the northern stretch was reached, with China claiming much of what is now northern Myanmar. Meanwhile, in 1937, Burma was separated from India and became a separate colony, gaining full independence in 1948.

During the Second World War, the Burma Road was constructed across the border as an Allied supply line for the Chinese forces fighting Japan. In 1941, following Japan's invasion of Burma, parts of Burma were ceded to Siam as the Saharat Thai Doem territory, thereby giving border with Thailand. These areas were returned to Burma in 1946 following Japan's defeat.

=== 1960 border treaty ===
Discussions between Burma and China over the border began in 1954, with China keen to control the area more effectively as it was being used as a base by Kuomintang troops. On 28 January 1960, a treaty was signed which delimited most of the border, which was later completed with a full delimitation treaty signed on 1 October 1960, with both sides ceding small areas along the border, such as areas around Kachin Hills/Jiangxinpo and Wa States, which China recognized most of the disputed territory belonging to Burma, while Burma relinquishing small amount of that disputed territory, namely Hpimaw (Pianma) (片馬; 片马; Piànmǎ) and adjacent Gawlam (Gulang) (古浪; Gǔlàng) and Kangfang (崗房; 岗房; Gǎngfáng) to PRC. They also agreed that Namwan area (which was in "perpetual lease" from China to Burma) would become part of Burma legally, in exchange for Burma ceding Panghung/Banhong and Panglao/Banlao to China. The two sides then demarcated the border on the ground in the following year. The border ran through the Wa region, although it had little practical effect on the Wa people.

=== Later developments ===
Since finalizing the border, relations between the two states have remained largely cordial, though the border region has at times been volatile owing to the ongoing insurgencies in Myanmar's Kachin and Shan states. In recent years several towns along the border, such as Mong La, Ruili and Muse, have become centres of gambling, prostitution and drug smuggling.

The border is porous as a militarized strict border control was controversial prior to 2020. Burmese migrant workers are included within the economy of Chinese border cities in Yunnan Province through a "compromise-oriented border control." China implemented flexible migration for Burmese workers while implementing surveillance, policing and other enforcement tactics in border cities instead of only at the border. Burmese migrants in Chinese border cities live and work within China but endure economic exploitation, spatial confinement and social discrimination. Additionally, there is a huge illegal immigrant problem due to the Myanmar civil war.

China constructed barriers along its 2129-km border with Myanmar, including a 12-foot-high fence designed to restrict cross-border movement.

== Border crossings ==
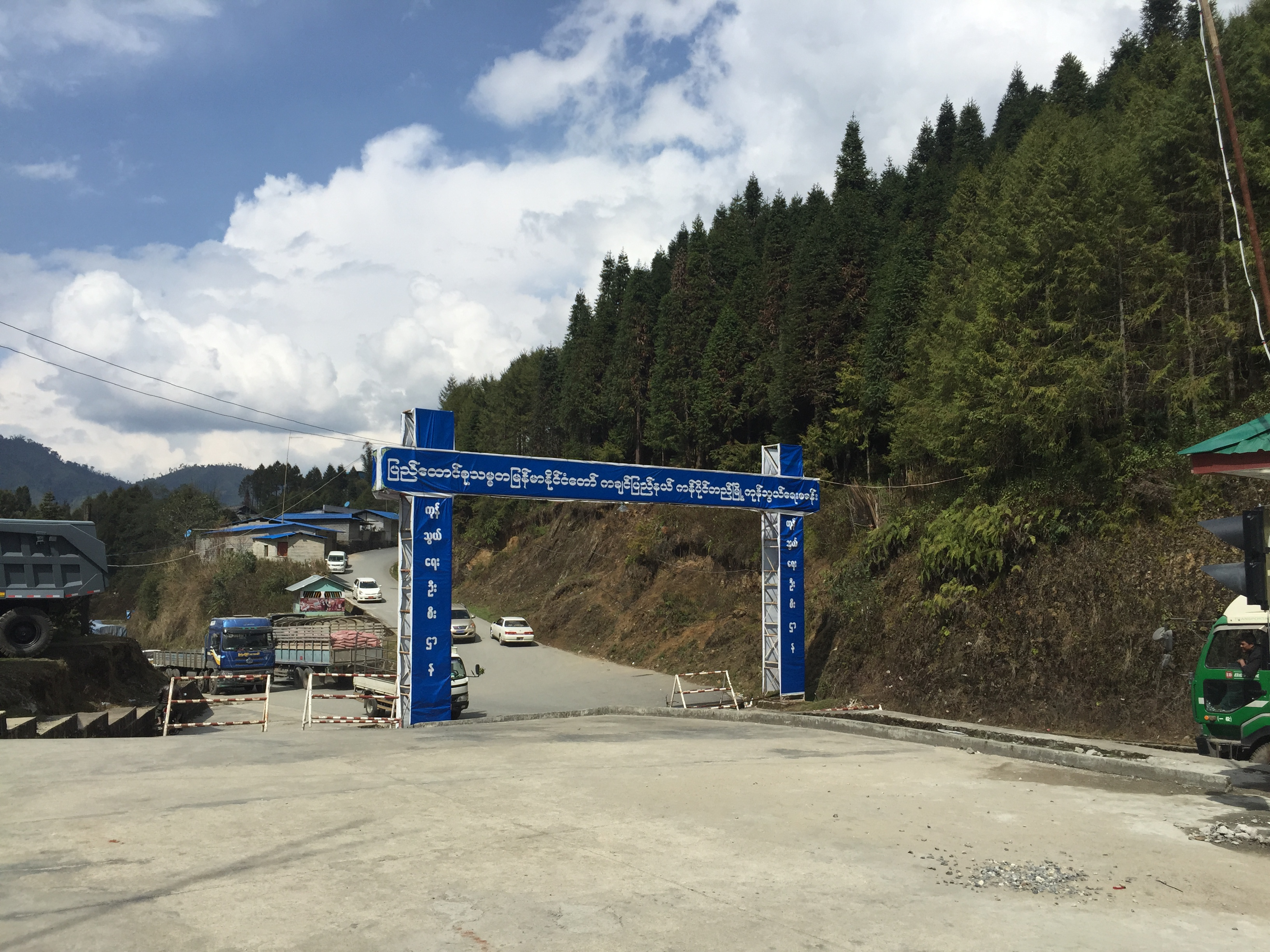
A border gate at Kan Paik Ti, Kachin State

Shan State:

- Guanlei River Port (Mengla County, Xishuangbanna)
- Menglong crossing (Jinghong City, Xishuangbanna) – NDAA control on Burmese side
- Mong La (NDAA control) – Daluo (Menghai County, Xishuangbanna)
- Mangxin crossing (Menglian County, Pu'er Prefecture) – NDAA control on Burmese side
- Pangkham (controlled by Wa State) – Meng'a (Menglian County, Pu'er)
- Natuoba (Wa State) – Mengka crossing (Ximeng County, Pu'er)
- Shawba (Wa State) – Yonghe crossing (Mengdong, Cangyuan County, Lincang Prefecture)
- Namtit (Wa State) – Mangka (Cangyuan, Lincang)
- Chinshwehaw – Qingshuihe (Gengma County, Lincang)
- Laukkai (Kokang Region) – Nansan (Zhenkang County, Lincang), incl. Yan Lon Kyaing passage
- Mong Ko – Manghai (Mangshi County, Dehong Prefecture)
- Pang Hseng (Kyukok) – Wanding (Ruili County, Dehong)
- Kyin San Kyawt (Jinsanjiao) – Wanding Mangman
- Muse – Ruili (including Nantaw, Mang Wein, and Sin Phyu passages)
- Manhero – Yinjing (open border)
- Namhkam – Nongdao
- Leiyun passage (Nongdao)

Kachin State:

- Lweje – Zhangfeng (Longchuan County, Dehong)
- Mai Ja Yang crossing (controlled by KIO)
- Laiza (controlled by KIO) – Nabang (Yingjiang County, Dehong)
- Kanpaikti (NDA-K border force joint control) – Houqiao (Tengchong County, Baoshan Prefecture)
- Pang War (NDA-K border force joint control) – Diantan (Tengchong, Baoshan)
- Hpimaw – Pianma (Lushui County, Nujiang Prefecture)

== Historical maps ==
Historical maps of the border from north to south in the International Map of the World, mid-late 20th century:

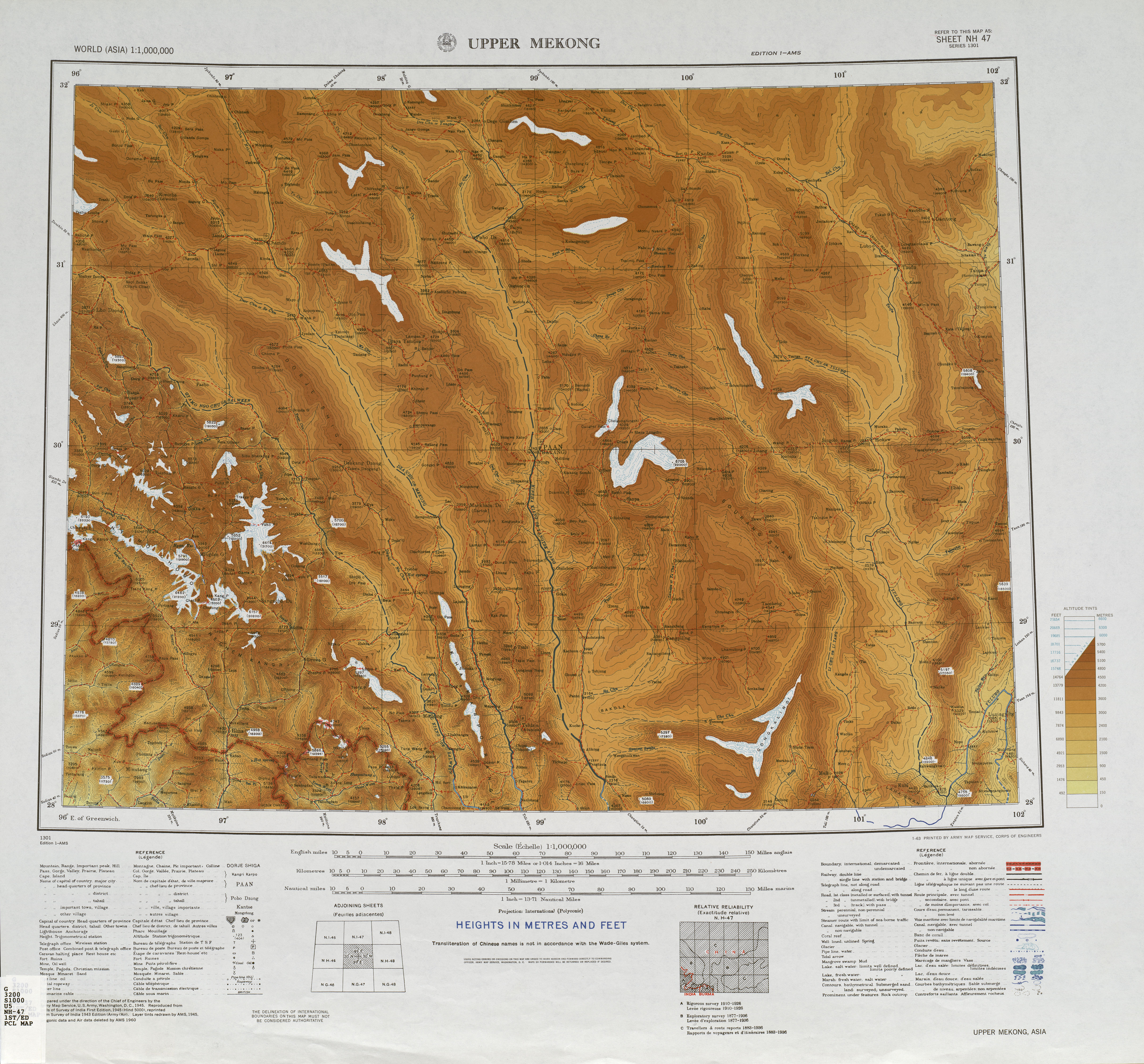

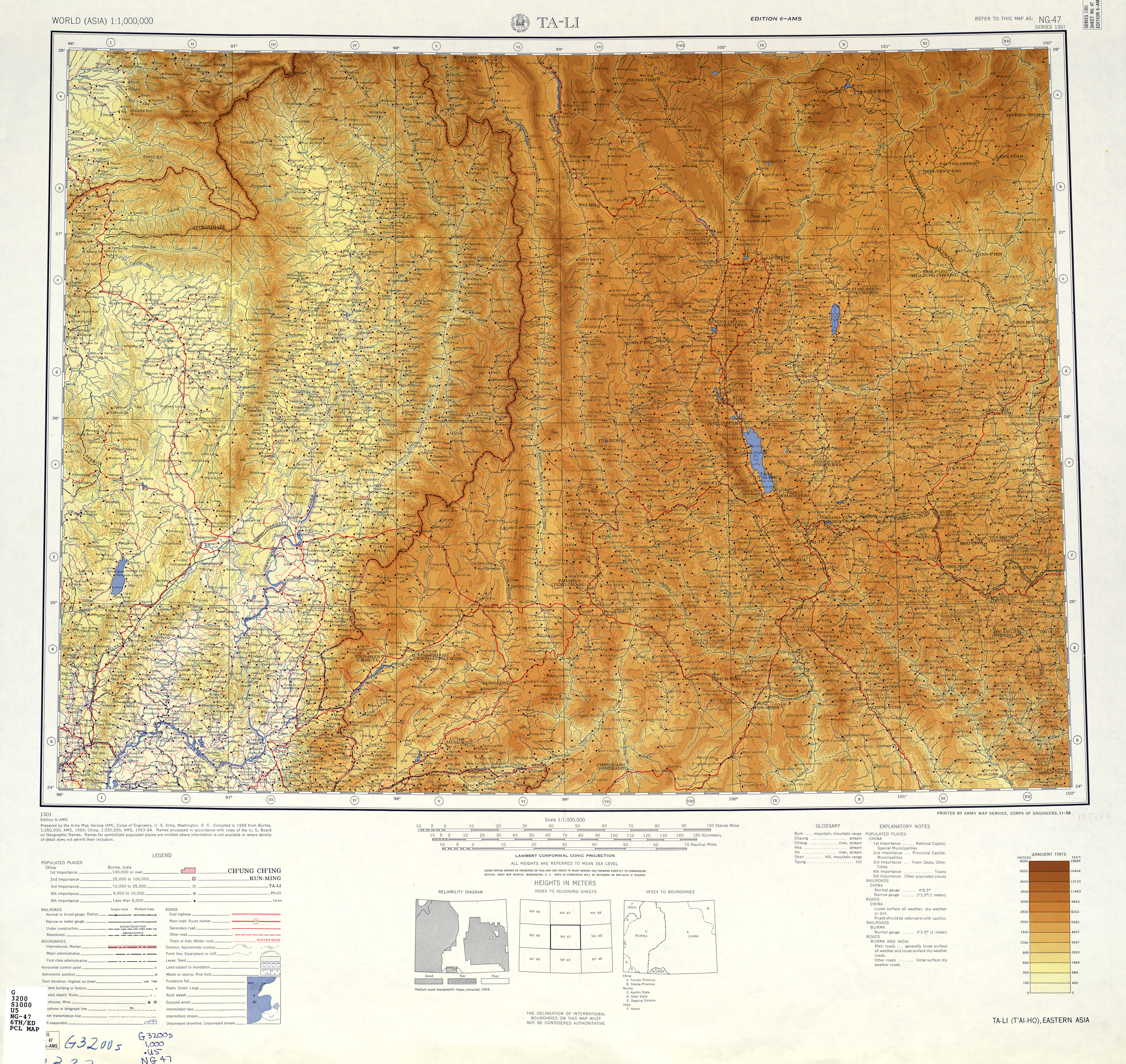

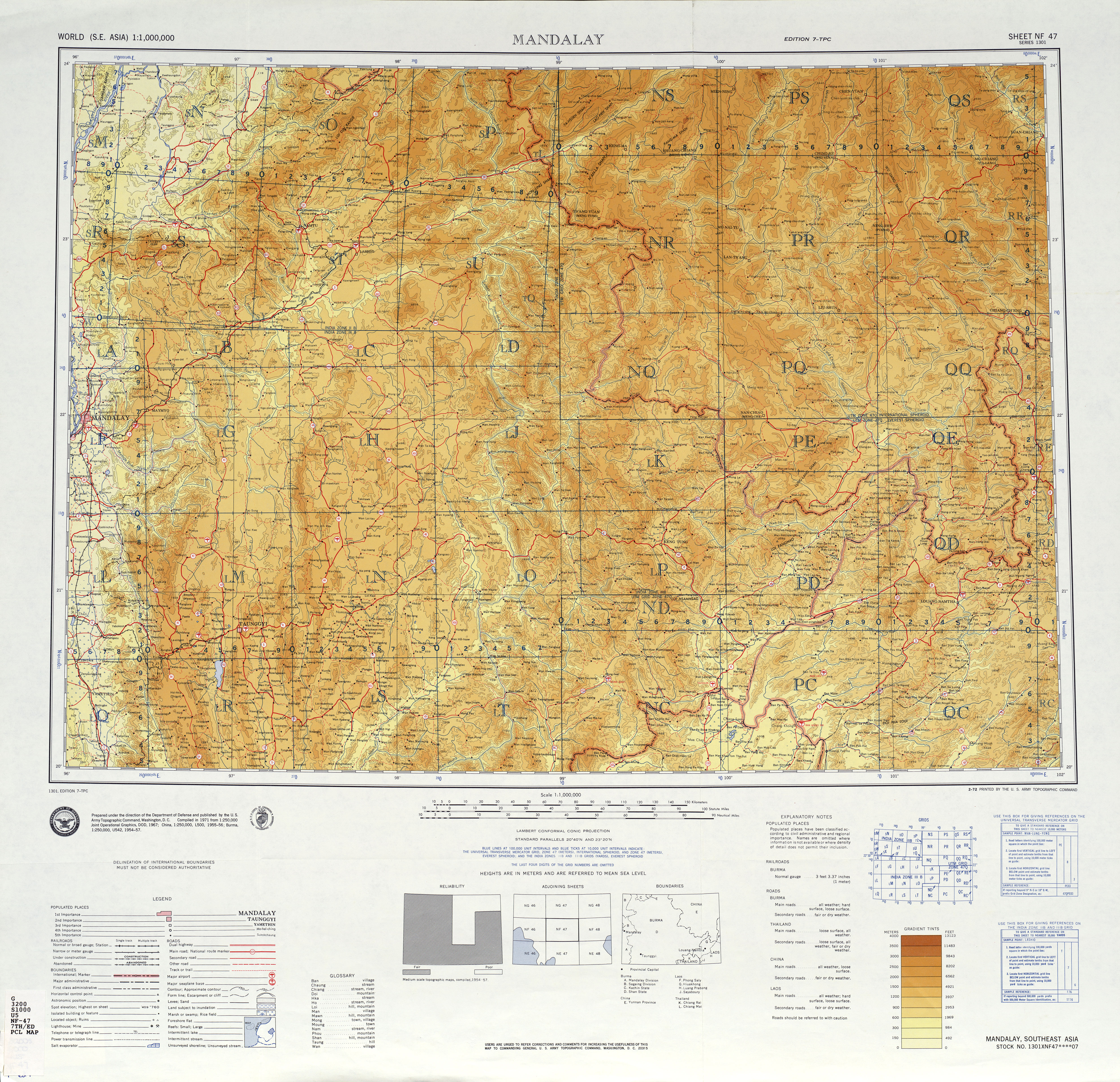

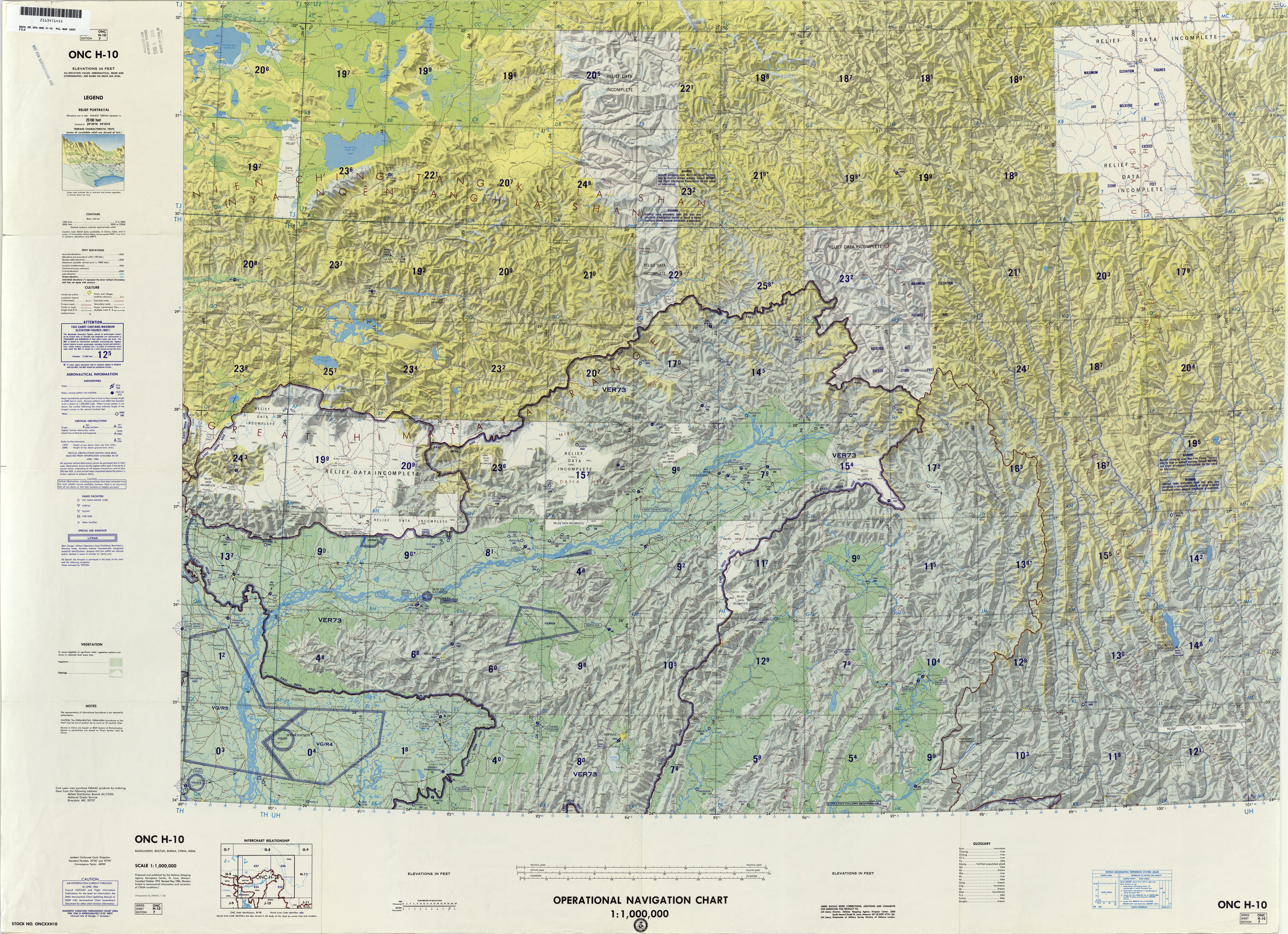

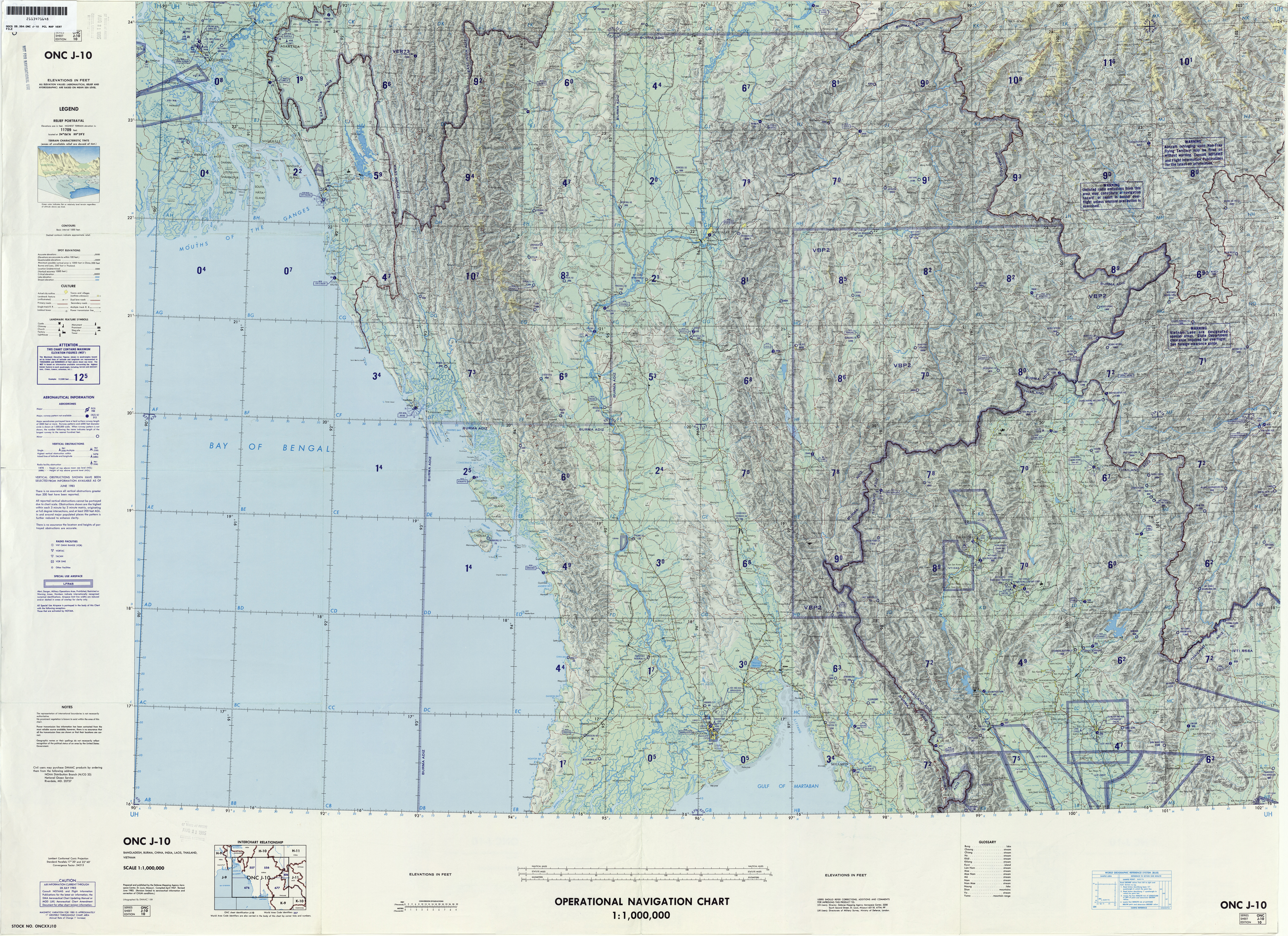

== See also ==
- Ports of entry of China
- China–Myanmar relations
- Namwan Assigned Tract
