= Mangka =

- Town

Chinese transcription(s)
  - Simplified: 芒卡镇
  - Traditional: 芒卡鎮
  - Pinyin: Mángkǎ Zhèn
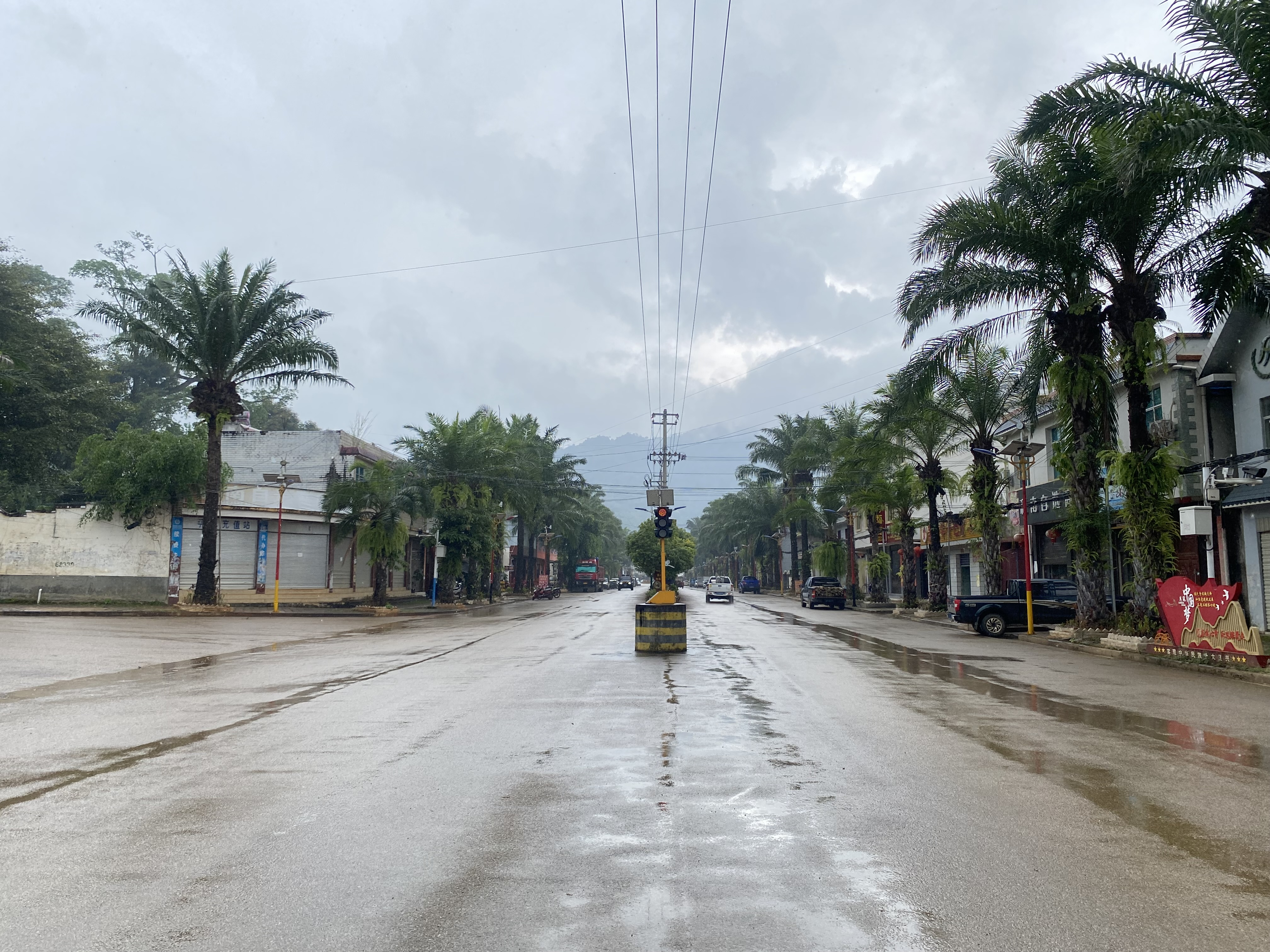
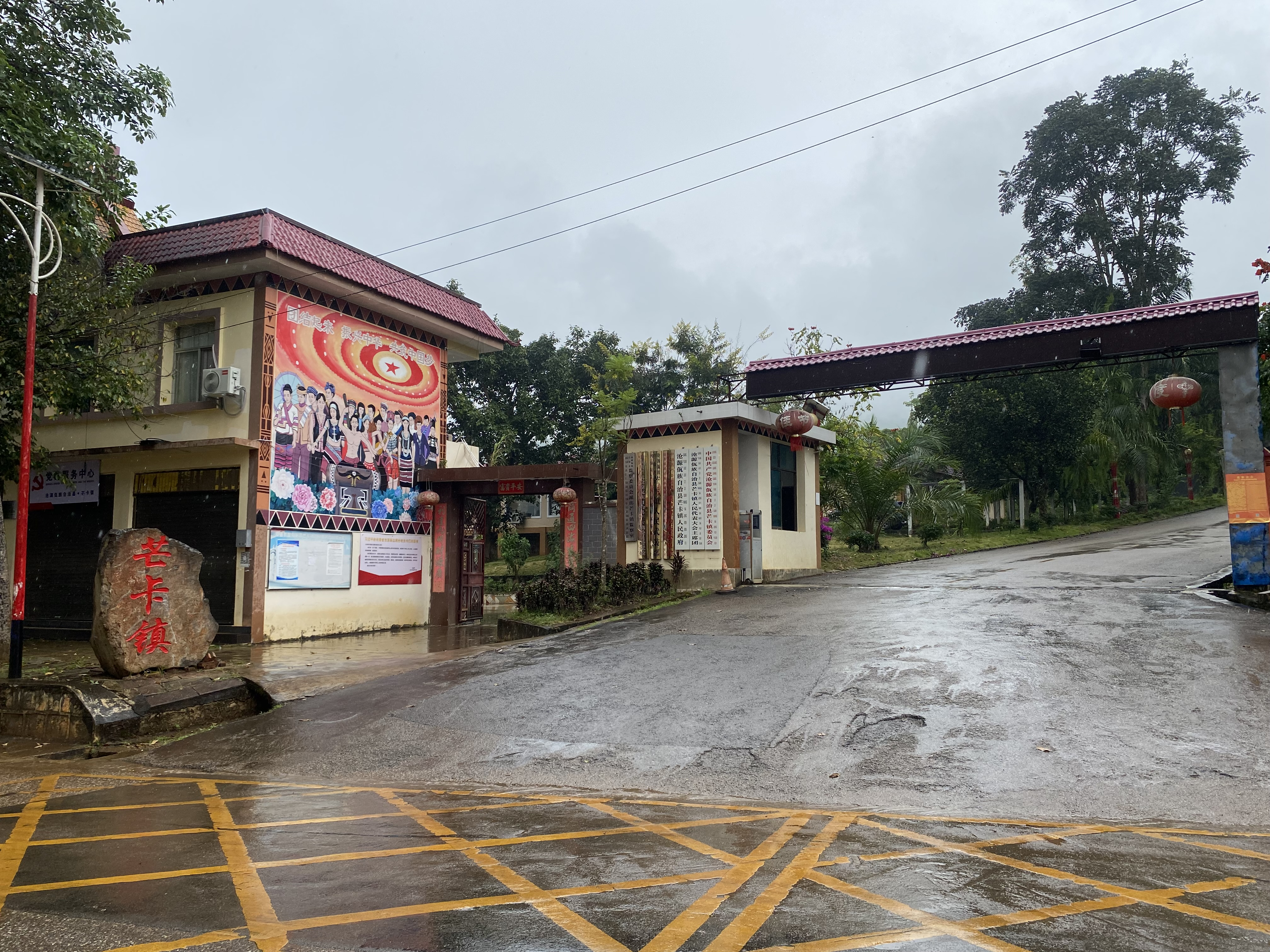
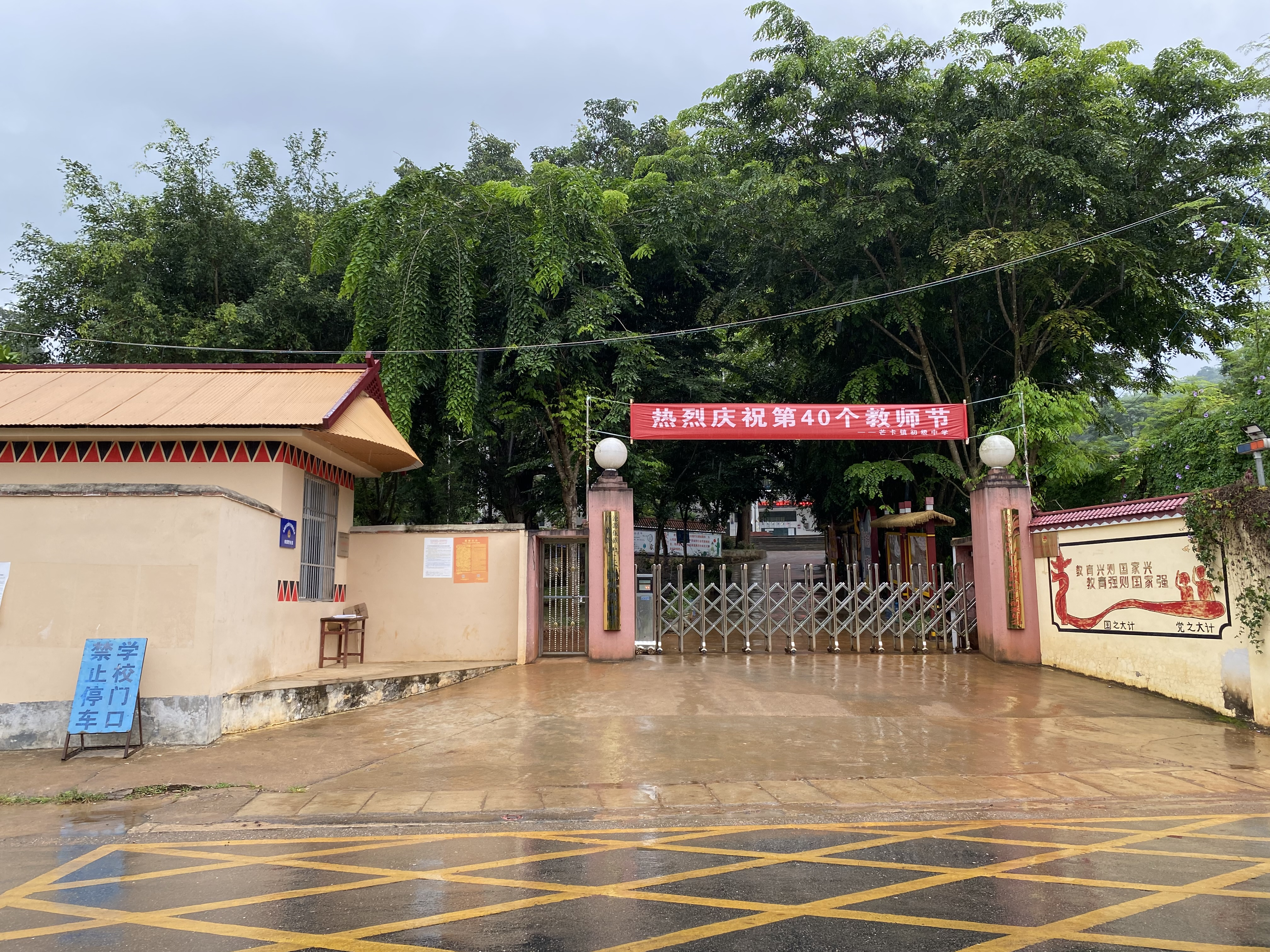
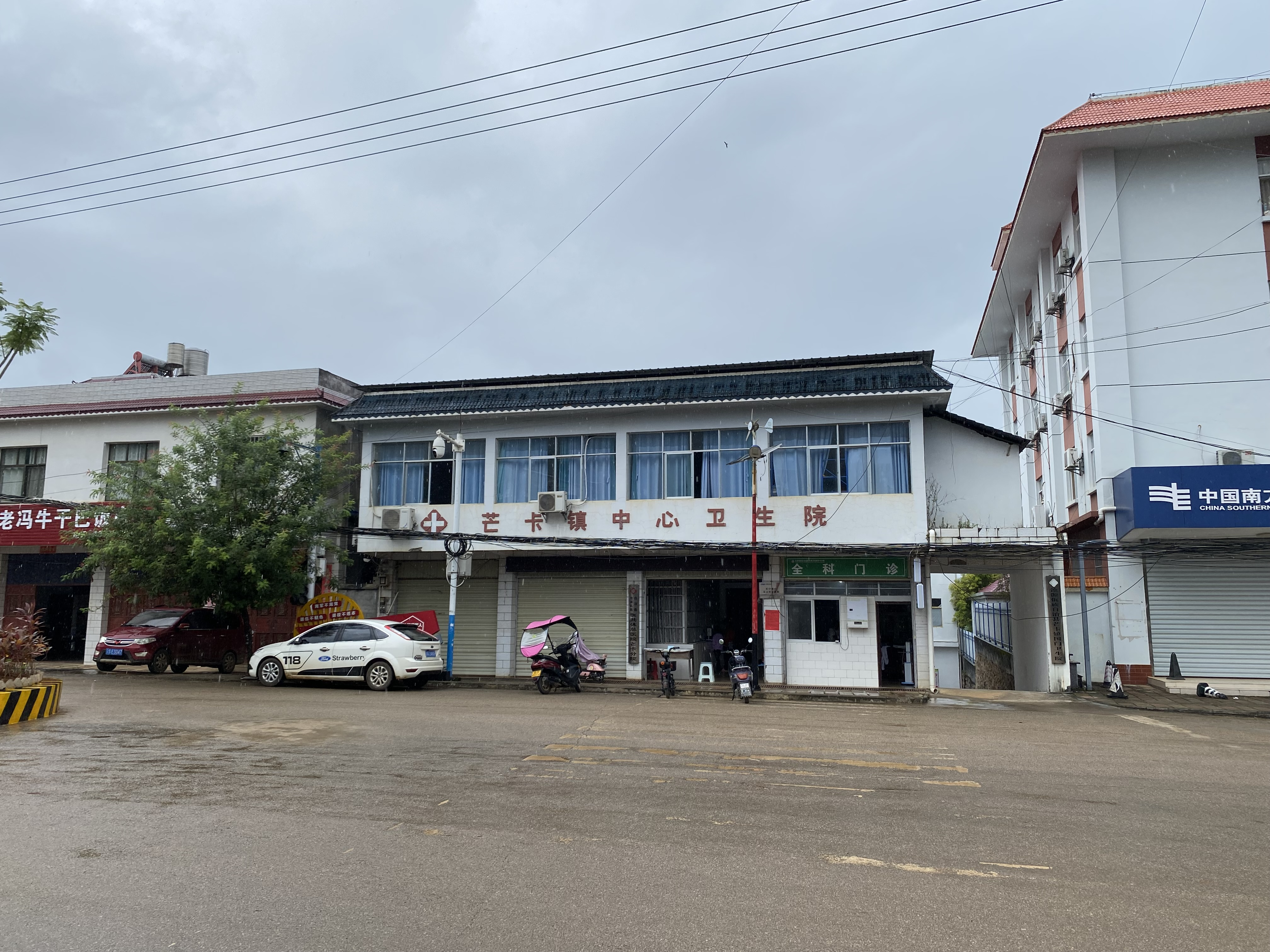
- Main street Town hall Mangka Middle School Mangka Town Hospital

- Location in Yunnan
- Coordinates: 23°29′18″N 98°54′28″E
- Country: China
- Province: Yunnan
- County: Cangyuan Va Autonomous County

Area
  - Total: 275.268 km^{2} (106.282 sq mi)

Population (2010)
  - Total: 13,689
  - Density: 49.730/km^{2} (128.80/sq mi)
- Time zone: UTC+8 (China Standard)
- Postal code: 677412
- Area code: 0883

Mangka Town (Chinese: 芒卡镇) is a rural town in Cangyuan Va Autonomous County, Yunnan, China. It is surrounded by Mengding Town on the north, Namtit Subtownship on the west, Banhong Township on the east, and Banlao Township on the south. As of the 2010 census it had a population of 13,689 and an area of 275.268 square kilometres (106.282 sq mi). This area is inhabited by Han, Wa and Dai people.

== Name ==
The word Mangka is transliteration in Dai language. "Mang" means stockaded village and "Ka" means thatch.

== History ==
On June 18, 1941, The Banhong Village and its western area are classified into Burma territory.

On January 25, 1960, China and Burma sign bilateral boundary division agreements, the boundary of the two countries was determined.

In 1984, Nanla District was established.

In 1988, it was incorporated as a township.

In 2002, it was upgraded to a town.

In 2013, the Huguang Village was listed among the second group of Chinese traditional villages.

== Administrative division ==
As of 2017, the town is divided into 9 villages: Manggang Village, Haiya Village, Koumeng Village, Nanla Village, Laipian Village, Baiyan Village, Huguang Village, Jiaoshan Village and Nanjing Village.

== Geography ==
The highest point in the town is Mount Huguangzhai (Chinese: 湖广寨大山) which stands 2,302.2 metres (7,553 ft) above sea level. The lowest point is the river mouth of Nanding River.

The Nanding River (Chinese: 南定河) and Xiaohei River (Chinese: 小黑河), tributaries of the Nu River, flow directly through the town.

Mangka is in the subtropical monsoon climate zone, with an average annual temperature of 15.6 °C (60.1 °F) and total annual rainfall of 2,000-millimetre (79 in).

== Economy ==
The town's main industries are agriculture, mining and ranching. The mineral resources here are gold, silver, lead, zinc and sulphur.

== Education ==
The town has ten primary schools and one middle school.

== Transportation ==
The Nancang Road (Chinese: 南沧路) passes across the town.

The town is connected to the G30 Linqing Expressway (Chinese: 临清高速公路).
