= Banlao Township =

- Township

Chinese transcription(s)
  - Simplified: 班老乡
  - Traditional: 班老鄉
  - Pinyin: Bānlǎo Xiāng
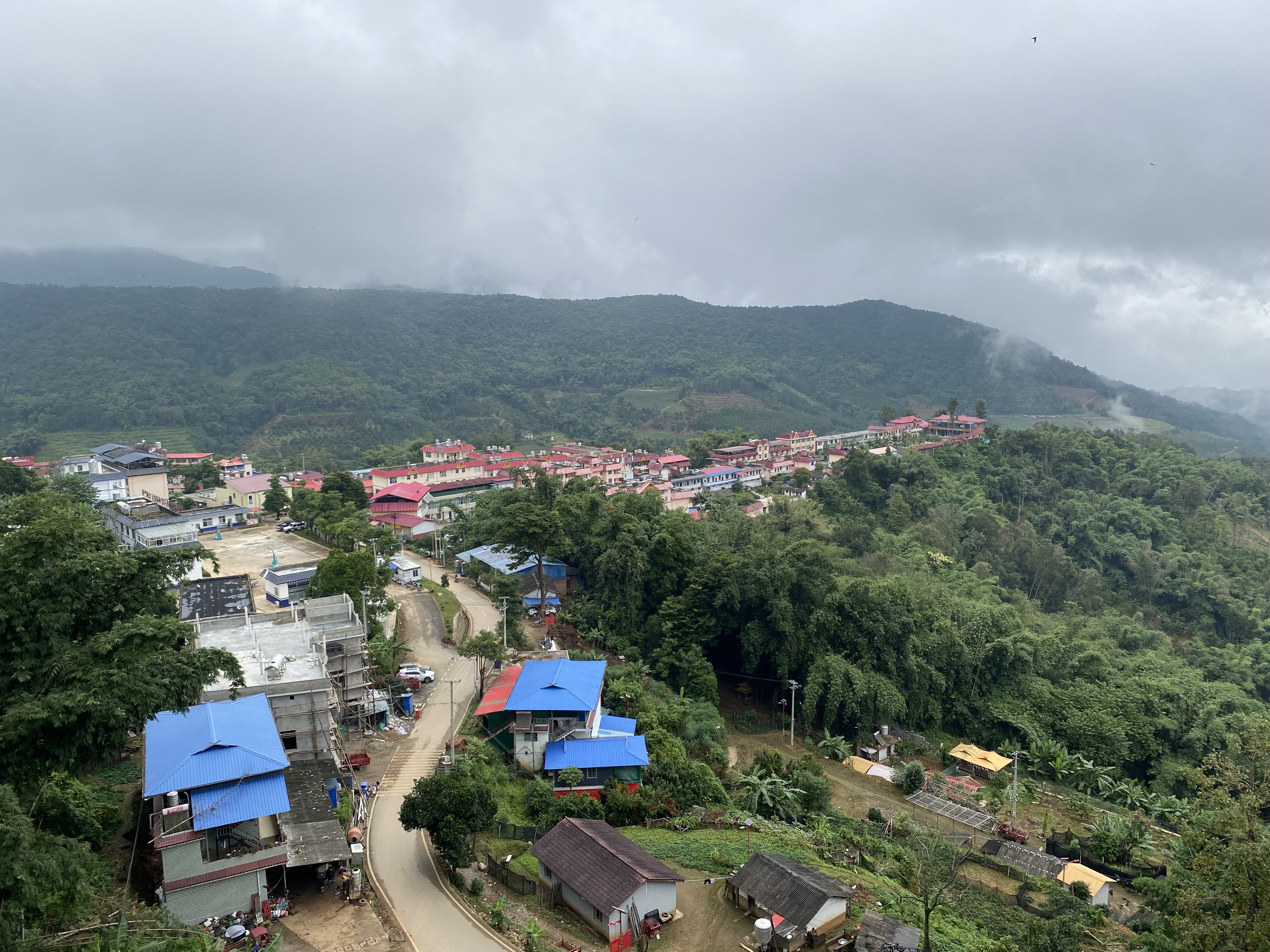
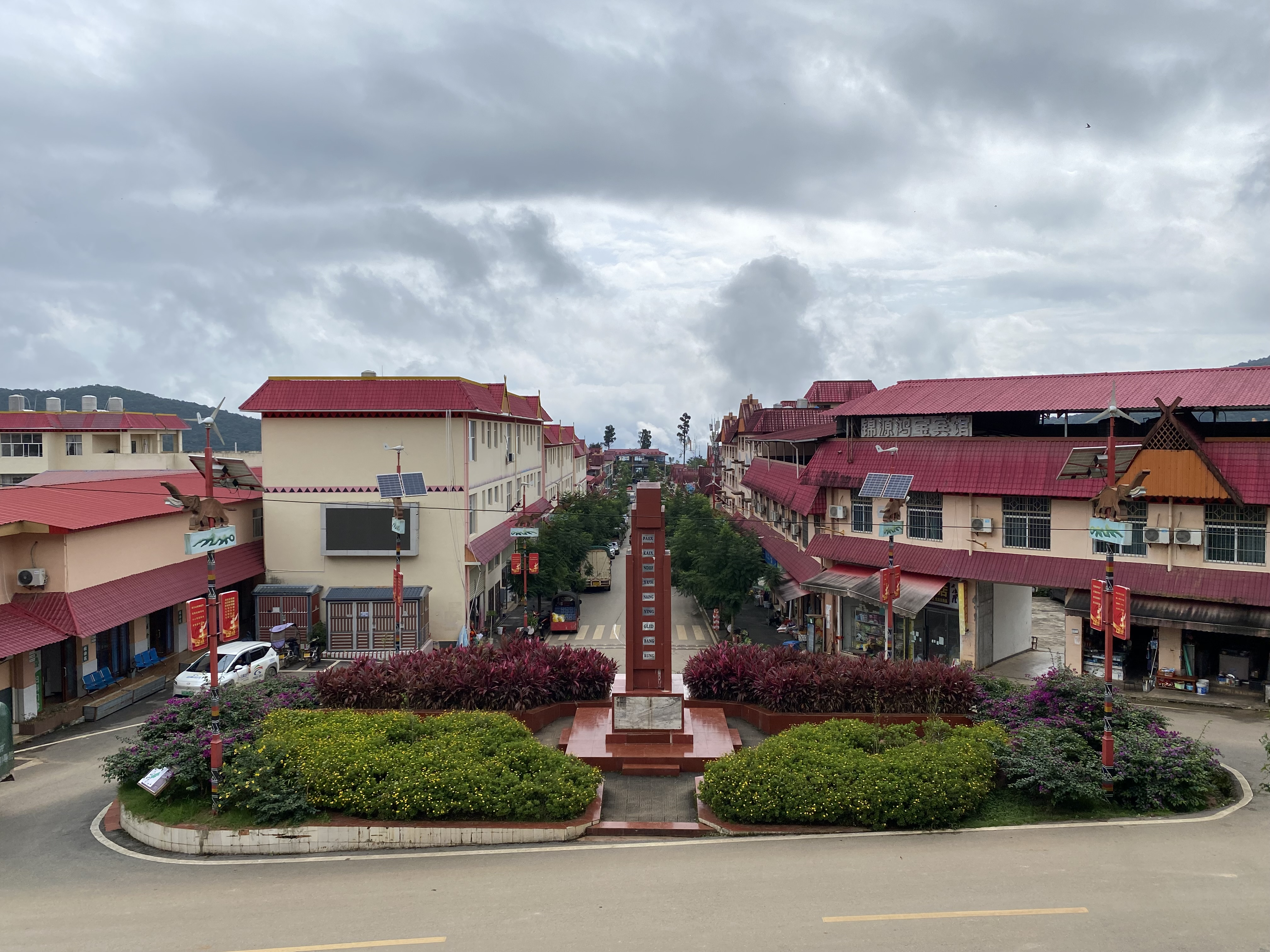
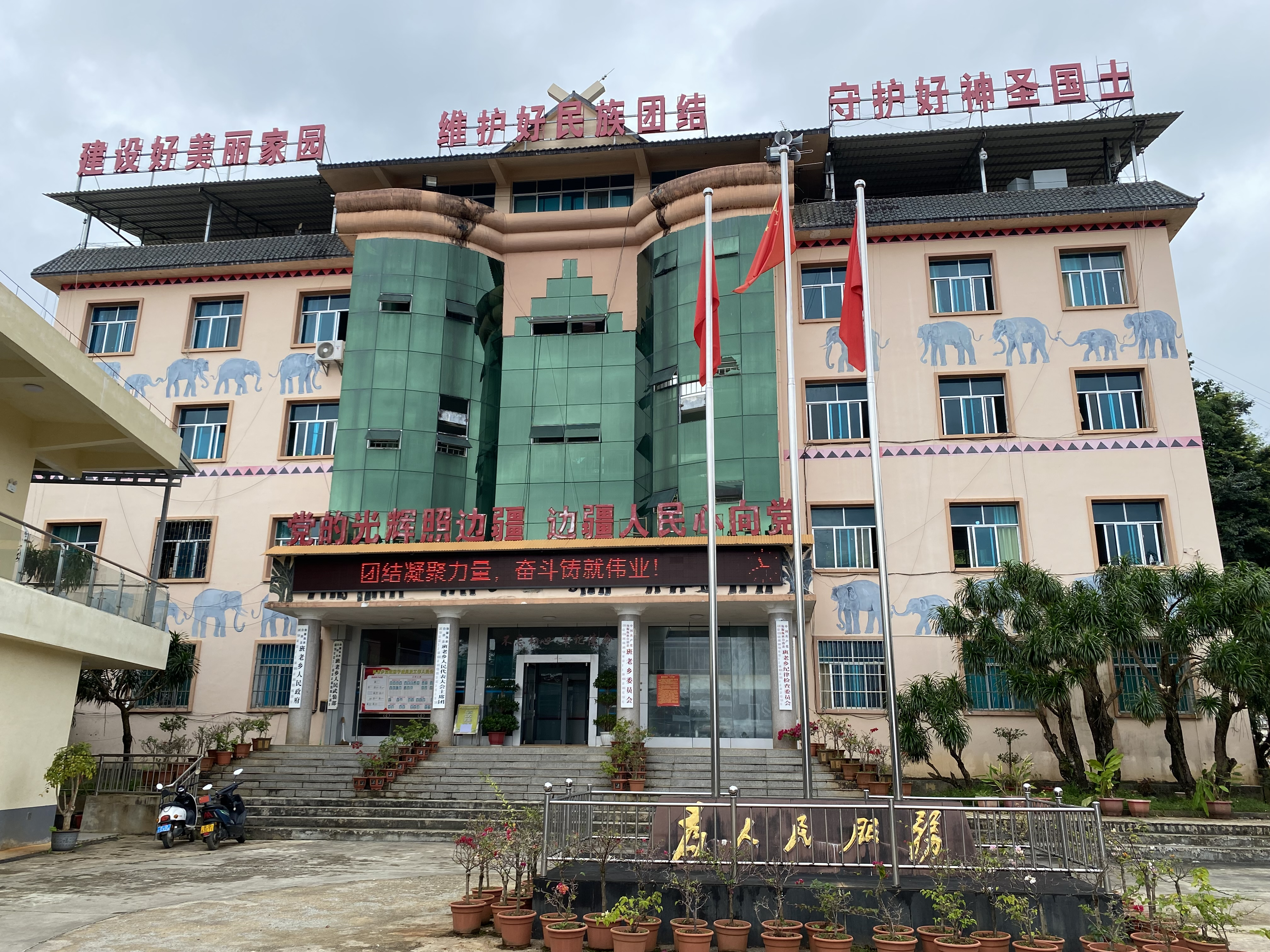
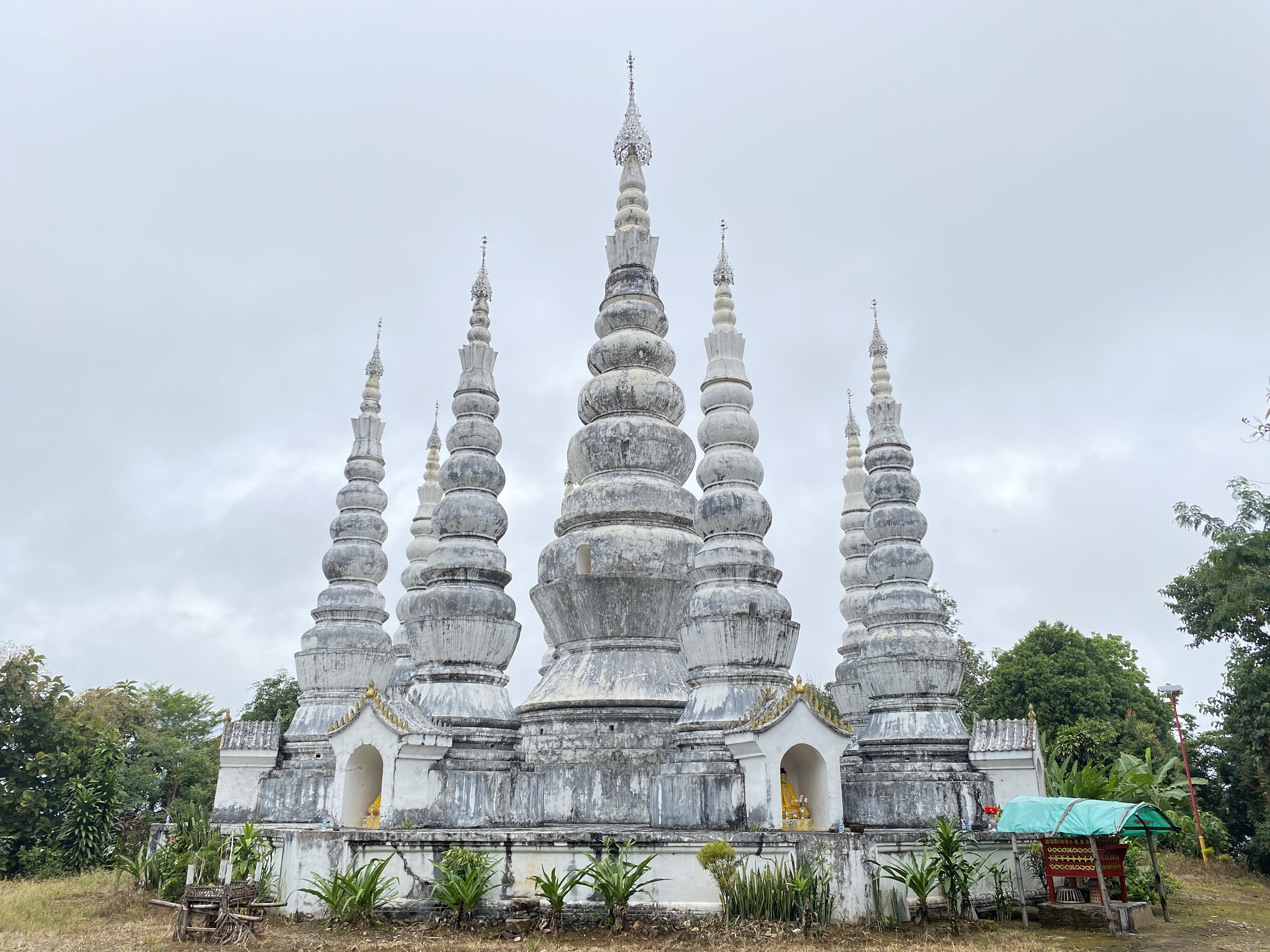
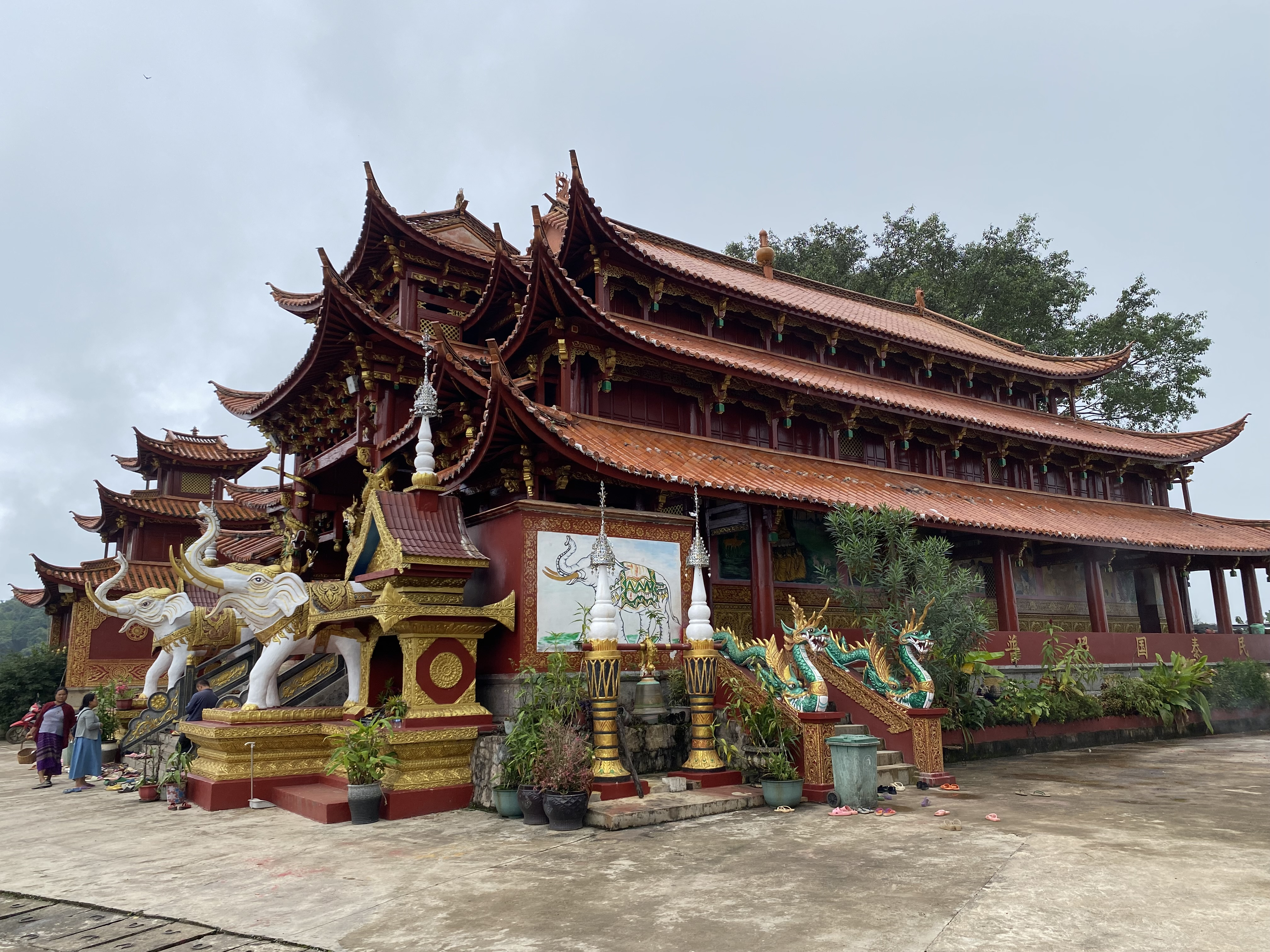
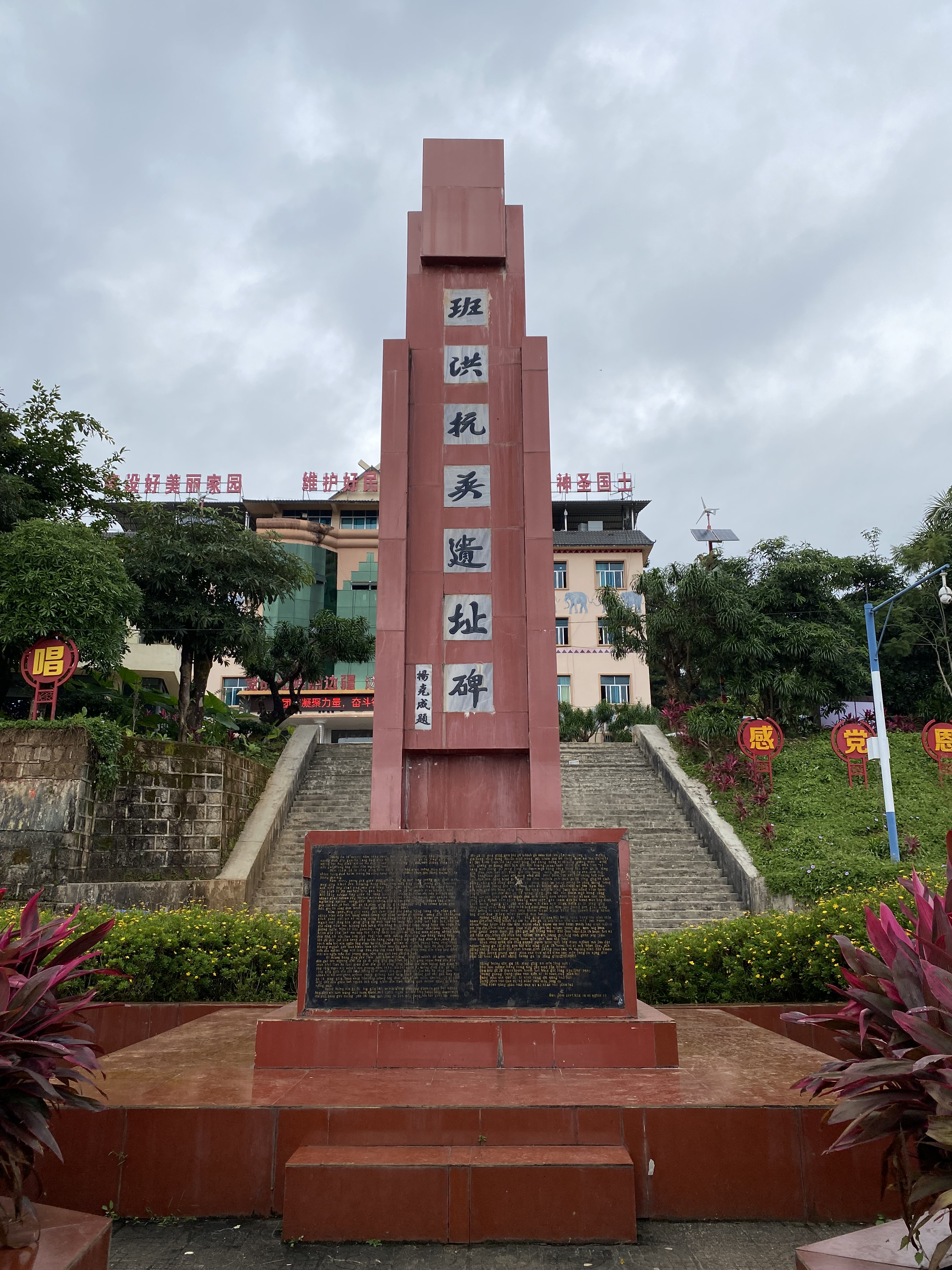
- Township skyline Main street Township hall Banlao White Stupa Banlao Central Temple Anti-British Site Stele

- Location in Yunnan.
- Coordinates: 23°15′05″N 98°55′58″E
- Country: China
- Province: Yunnan
- County: Cangyuan Va Autonomous County

Area
  - Total: 172.332 km^{2} (66.538 sq mi)

Population (2010)
  - Total: 8,887
  - Density: 51.57/km^{2} (133.6/sq mi)
- Time zone: UTC+8 (China Standard)
- Postal code: 677404
- Area code: 0883

Banlao Township (Chinese: 班老乡) is a rural township in Cangyuan Va Autonomous County, Yunnan, China. The township shares a border with Mongmao Township to the west and south, Mangka Town to the north, and Banhong Township to the east. As of the 2010 census it had a population of 8,887 and an area of 172.332 square kilometres (66.538 sq mi).

== Name ==
The word Banlao is transliteration in Dai language. Banlao means site for discussion.

== History ==
On June 18, 1941, the west of the Banhong Village belonged to Burma.

On January 25, 1960, China and Burma sign bilateral boundary division agreements, the boundary of the two countries was determined.

It was upgraded to a township in 1988.

== Administrative division ==
As of 2017, the township is divided into 6 villages: Shangbanlao (Chinese: 上班老村), Xiabanlao (Chinese: 下班老村), Xinzhai (Chinese: 新寨村), Yingpan (Chinese: 营盘村), Bangao (Chinese: 班搞村), and Palang (Chinese: 帕浪村).

== Geography ==
The highest point in the township is Mount Gongmoxiang (Chinese: 公莫香山) which stands 1,747 metres (5,732 ft) above sea level. The lowest point is Dongnahai (Chinese: 垌那海), which, at 520 metres (1,710 ft) above sea level.

The Nangun River (Chinese: 南滚河), Nanyi River (Chinese: 南衣河), Nanka River (Chinese: 南卡河), tributaries of the Nu River, flow through the township.

The Shangbanlao Reservoir (Chinese: 上班老水库) is the largest body of water in the township.

The township enjoys a subtropical humid monsoon climate, with an average annual temperature of 21.7 °C (71.1 °F) and average annual rainfall of 1,965.8-millimetre (77.39 in).

== Economy ==
Natural rubber, cassava, tea, walnuts and rapeseed are major cash crops.

== Attractions ==
Nangun River Natural Protection Area (Chinese: 南滚河自然保护区) is a national nature reserve in the township.

The White Pagoda (Chinese: 白塔) is a famous scenic spot in the area.
