= Mengdong =

Mengdong Chinese: 勐董 Va: Meng Doung / Gaeng Dum
- Town
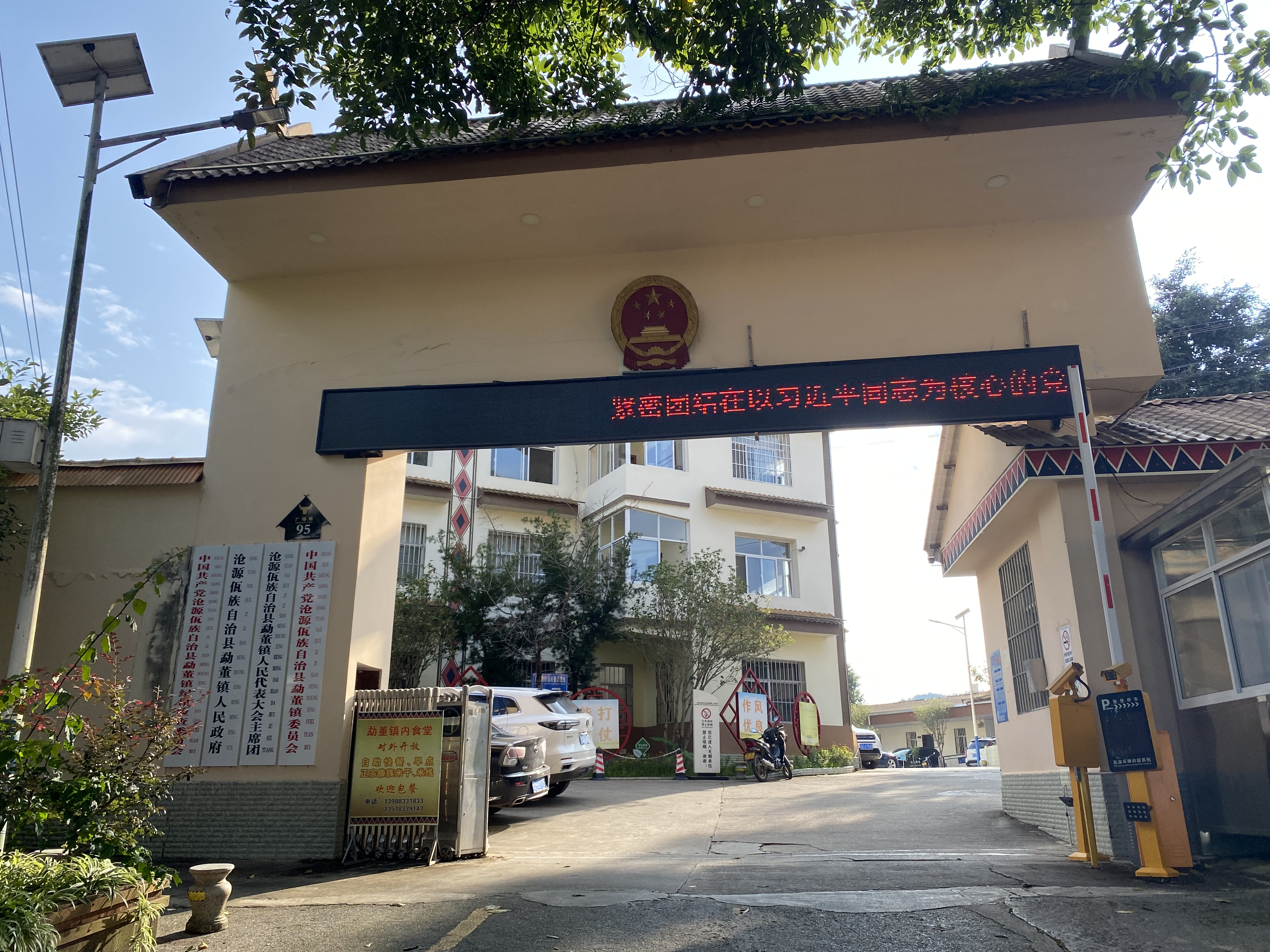
- Mengdong town hall

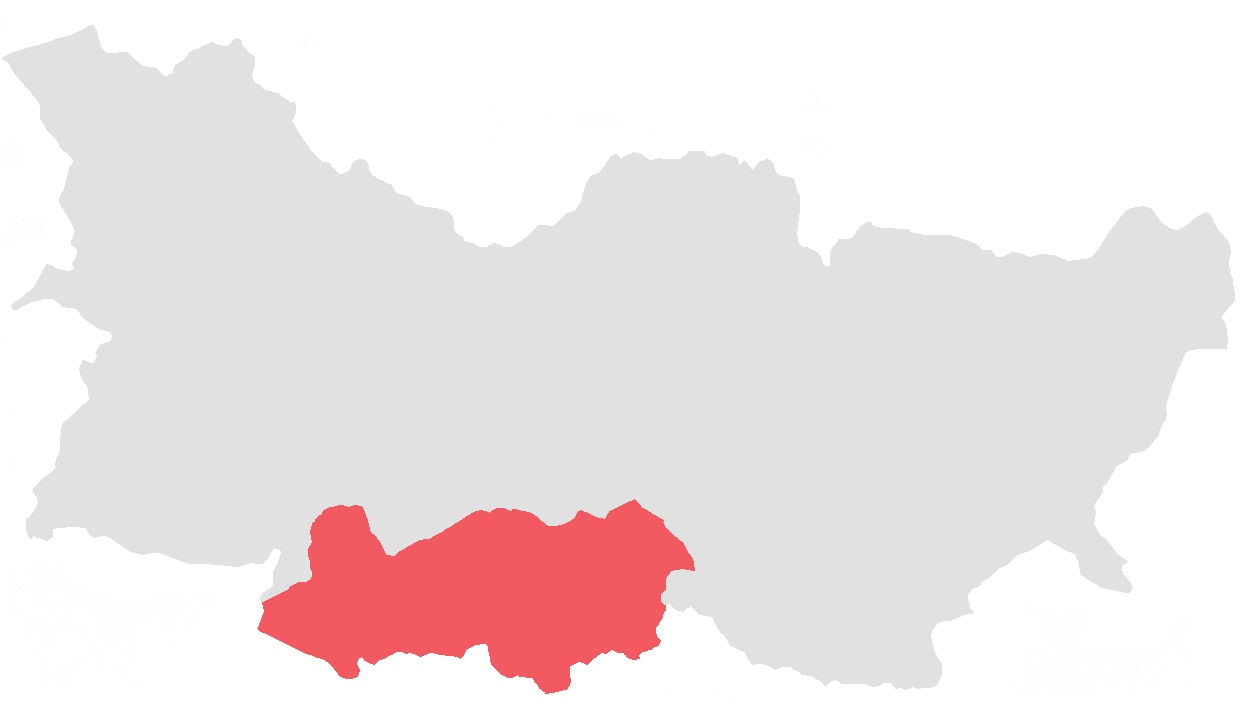
- Mengdong Town (red) in Cangyuan County
- Coordinates: 23°08′51″N 99°14′57″E
- Country: China
- Province: Yunnan
- Prefecture-level city: Lincang
- County: Cangyuan Va Autonomous County
- Established time: 1936

Area
  - Total: 260.07 km^{2} (100.41 sq mi)

Population (2010 census)
  - Total: 35,741
  - Density: 137.43/km^{2} (355.94/sq mi)
- Postal code: 677499
- Phone number: 883

Mengdong (Chinese: 勐董; Va: Meng Doung / Gaeng Dum) is a town of Cangyuan Va Autonomous County and the government seat of the county. Guangyun Temple was built in 1828, which is one of the major historical and cultural sites of China. Mengdong is also a land port of China which connects to Wa State of Myanmar.

== Friendly towns ==
- Tai'an, Miaoli, Taiwan
