= Cangyuan Va Autonomous County =

Cangyuan County 沧源县 · Qang Yuan Sian
- Autonomous county
- 沧源佤族自治县; Qang Yuan Vax Qux Zi Zi Sian; Cangyuan Va Autonomous County
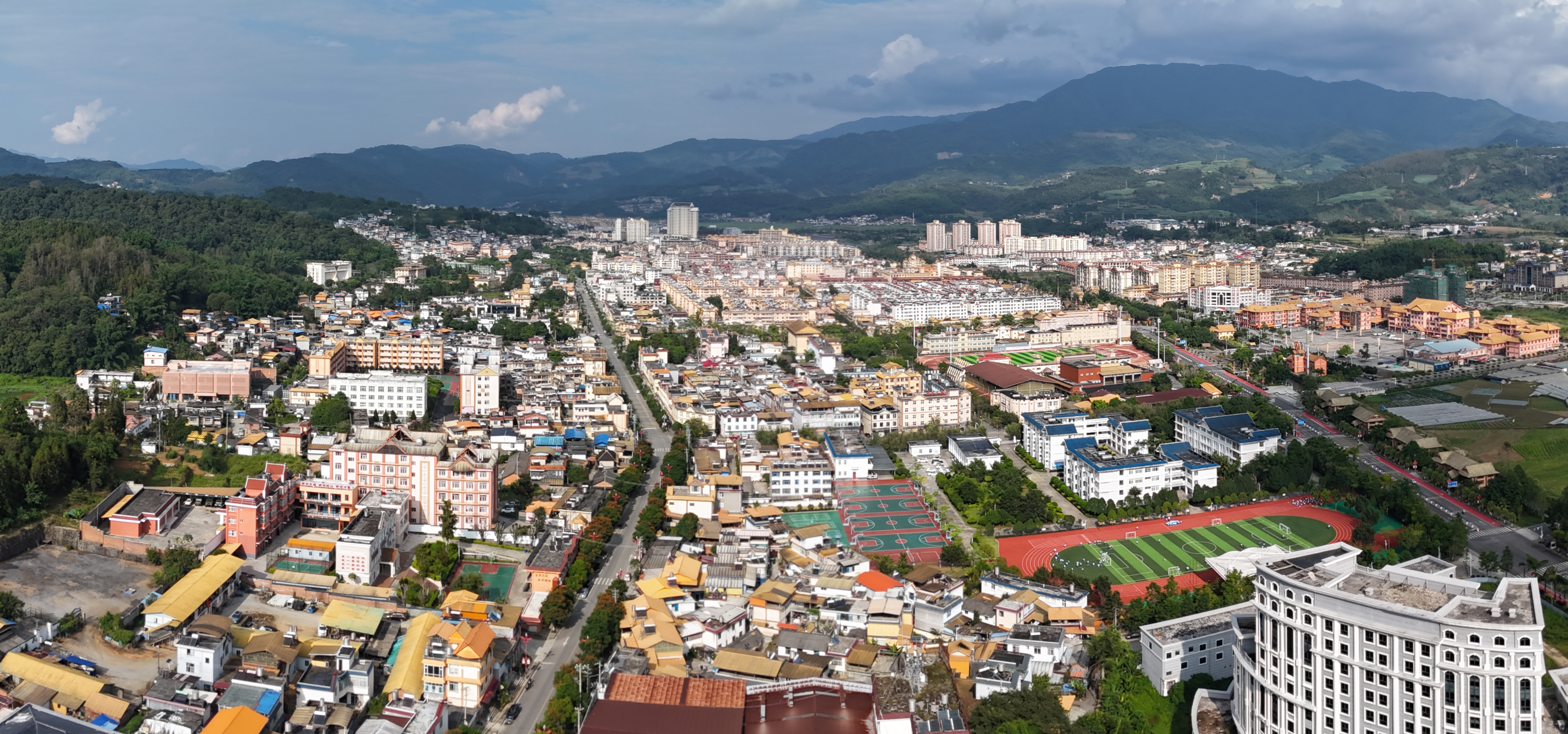
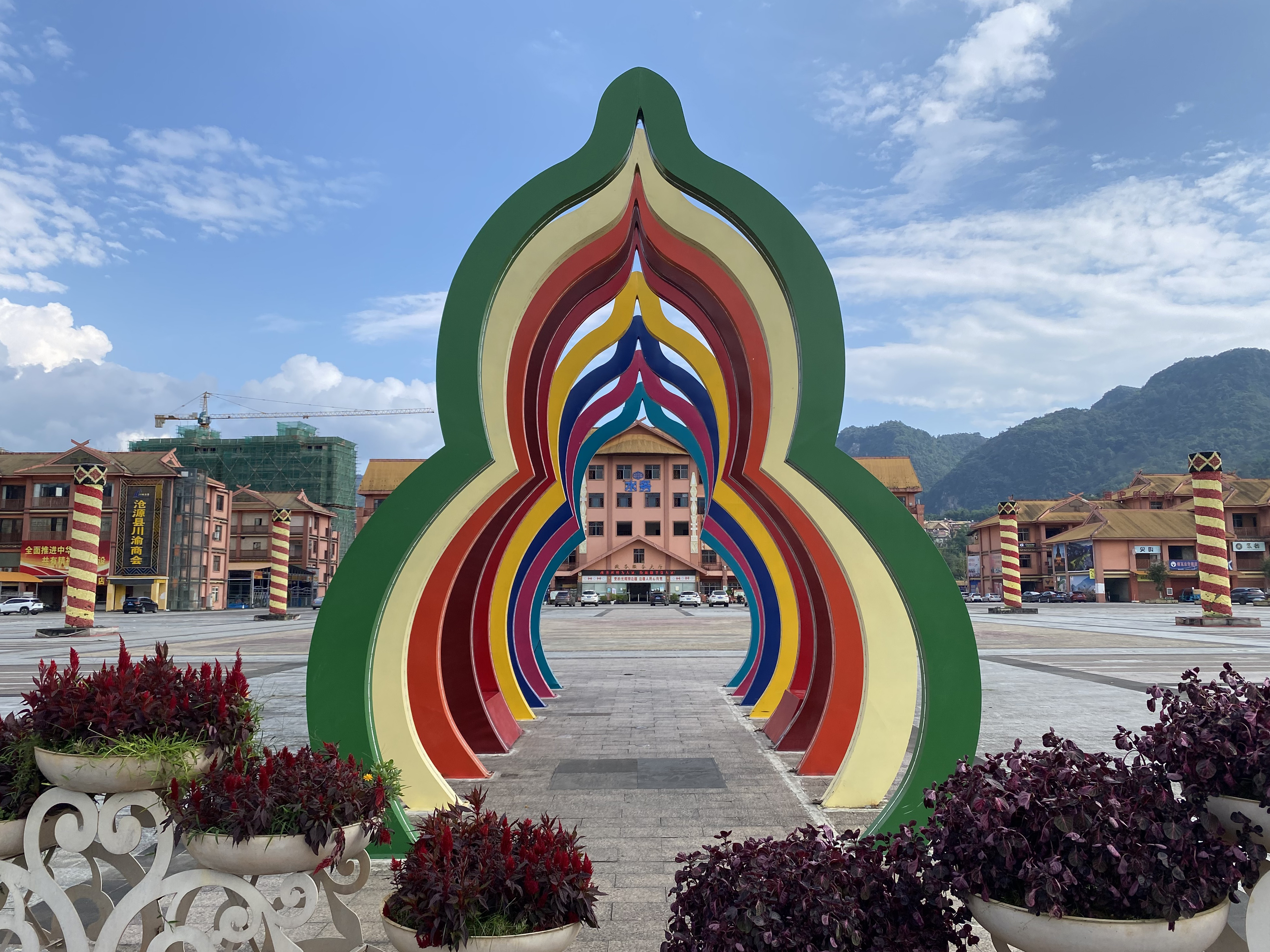
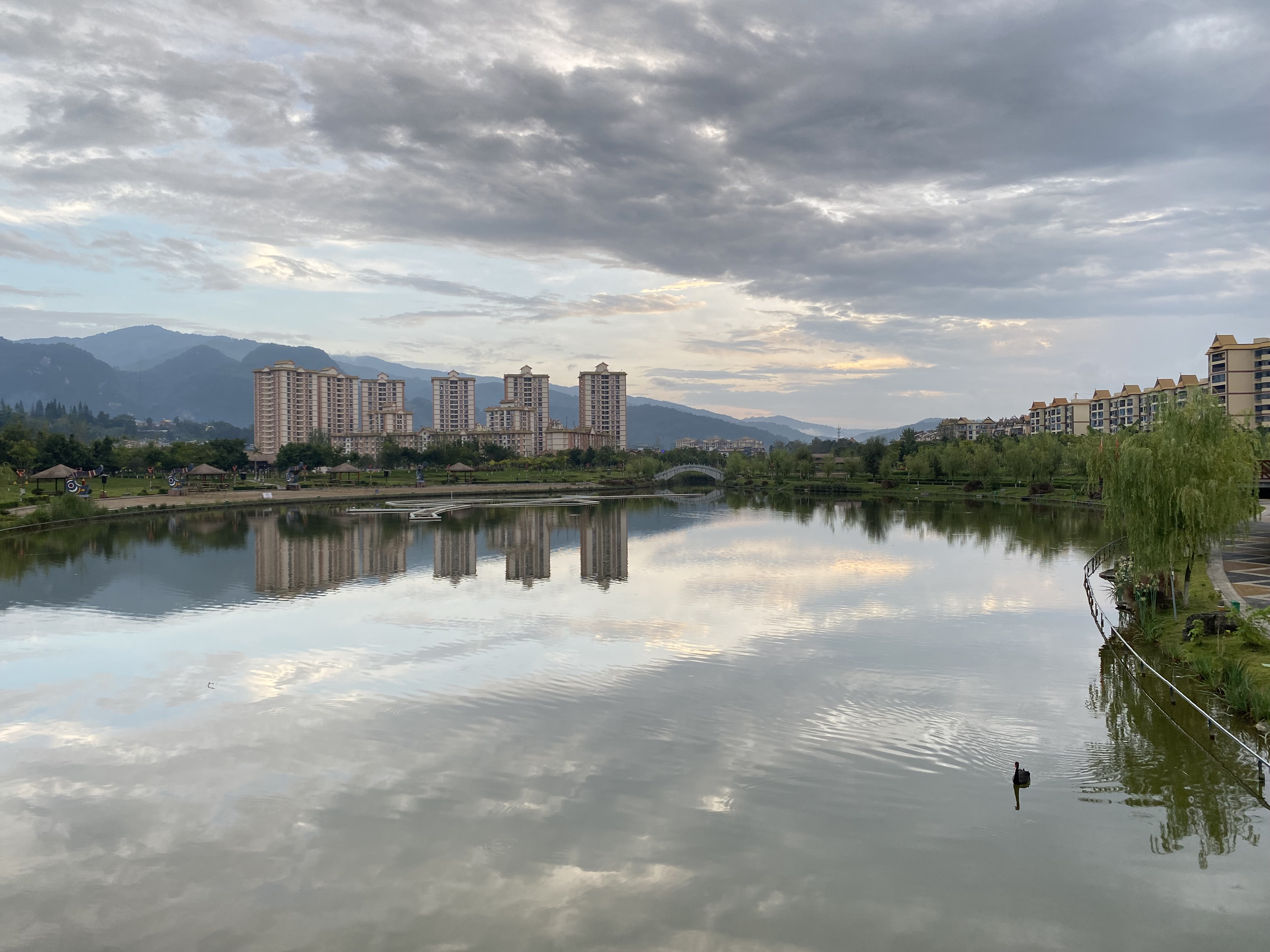
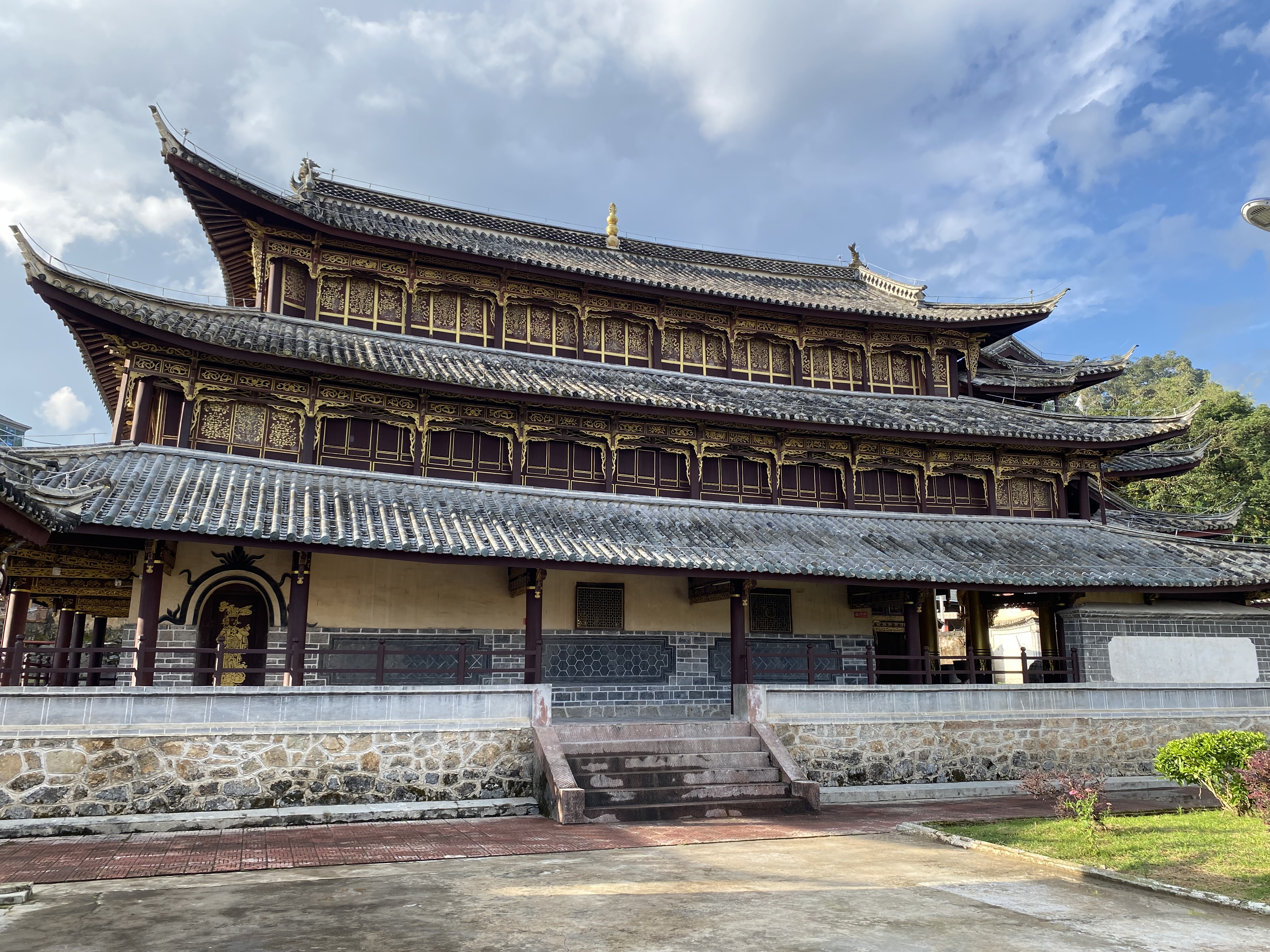
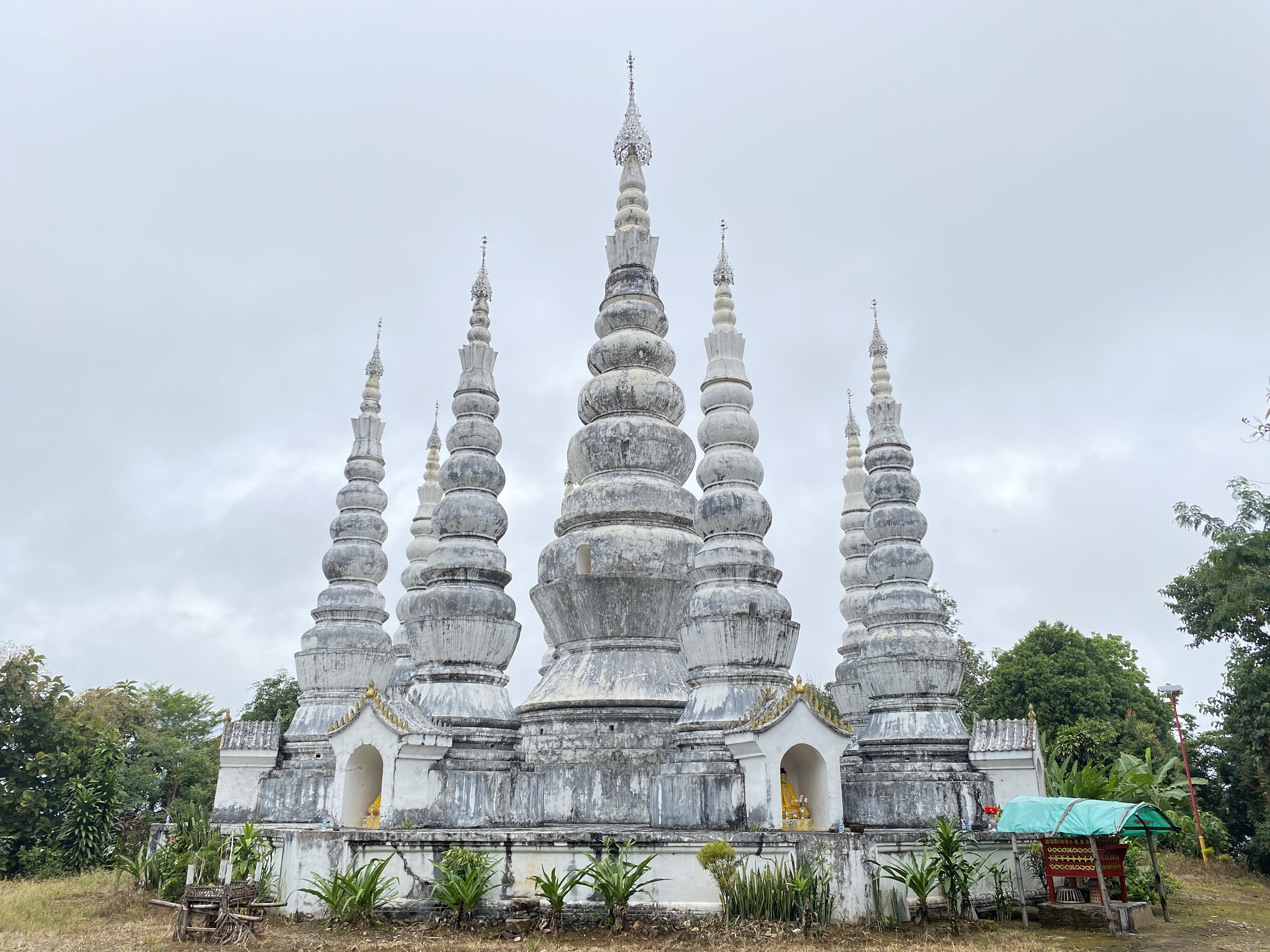
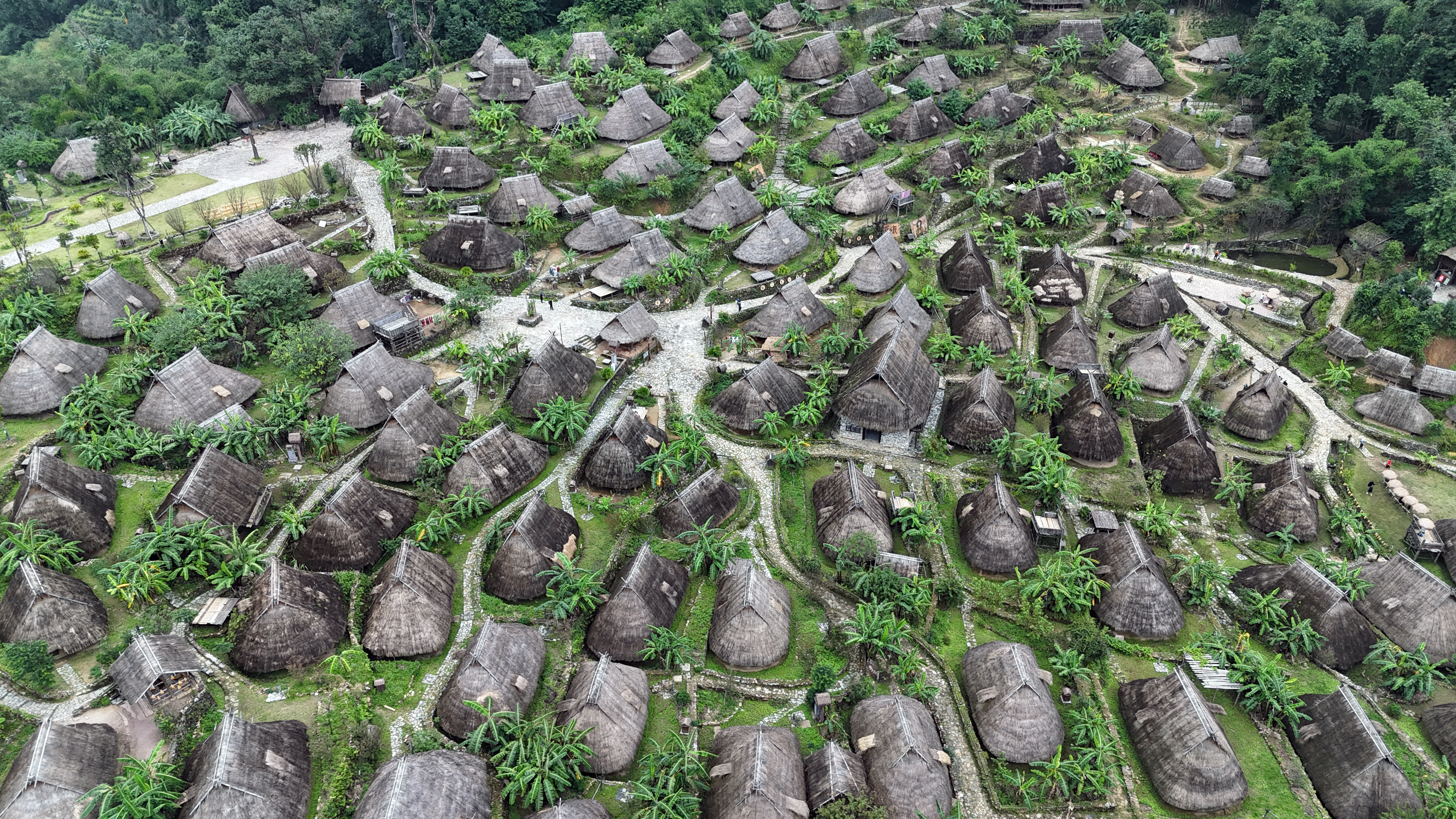
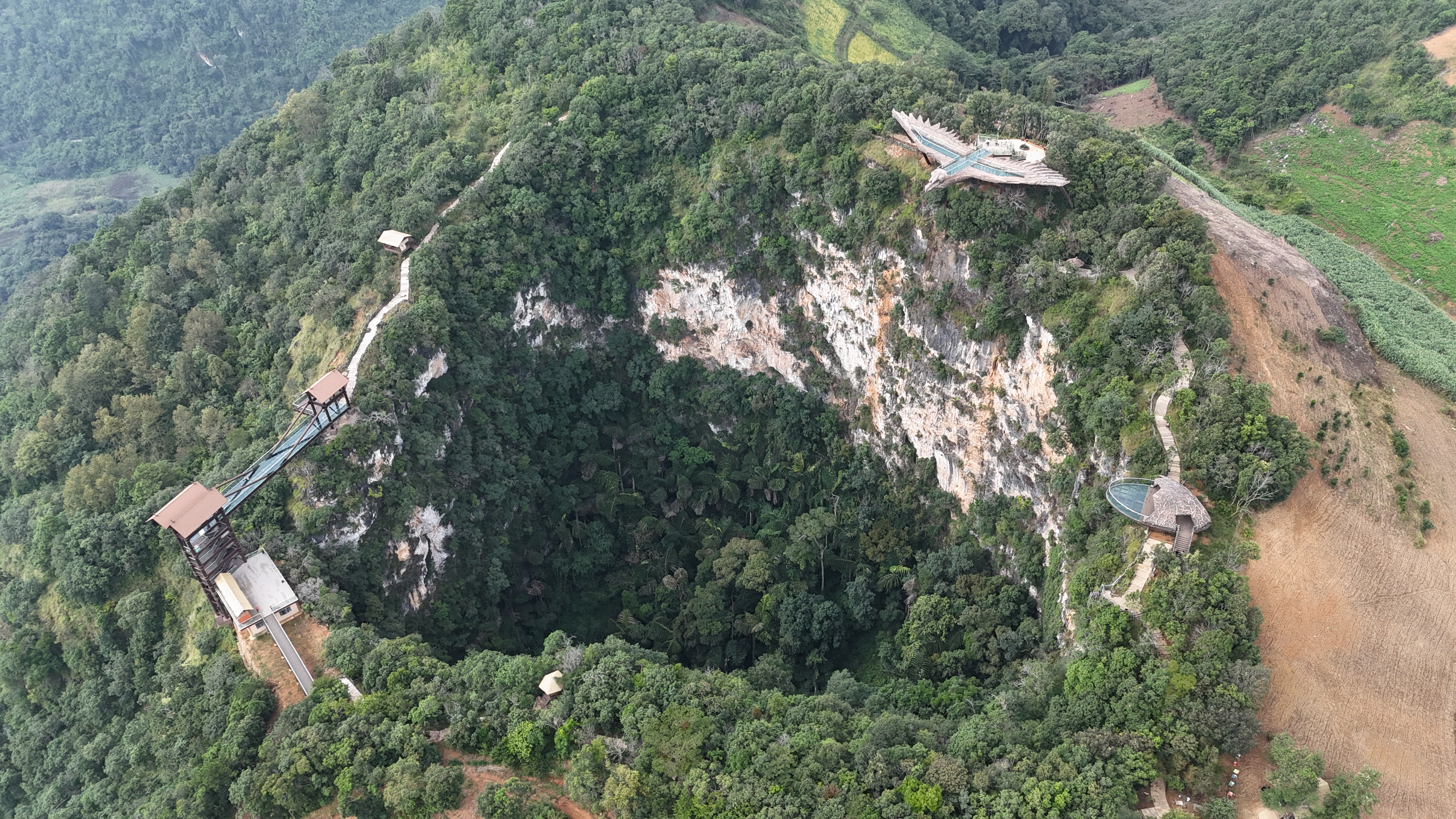
- Cityscape of county town Monihei Square Hulu Lake Park Guangyun Temple Banlao Stupa Om Din village Cangyuan Sinkhole

- Location of Cangyuan County (red) and Lincang Prefecture (pink) within Yunnan province of China

- Location within China
- Coordinates: 23.2267°N 99.3356°E
- Country: China
- Province: Yunnan
- Prefecture-level city: Lincang
- County seat: Mengdong

Area
  - Total: 2,539 km^{2} (980 sq mi)

Population (2020 census)
  - Total: 160,262
  - Density: 63.12/km^{2} (163.5/sq mi)
- Time zone: UTC+8 (CST)
- Postal code: 677400
- Area code: 0883
- Website: www.cangyuan.gov.cn

Cangyuan Va Autonomous County (simplified Chinese: 沧源佤族自治县; traditional Chinese: 滄源佤族自治縣; pinyin: Cāngyuán Wǎzú Zìzhìxiàn; Awa: Qang Yuan Vax Qux Zi Zi Sian) is under the administration of Lincang City, in the southwest of Yunnan province, China. Wa/Va people are the main inhabitants here. Wa language is common here. Cangyuan Washan Airport is located in the county.

== Administrative divisions ==
Cangyuan Va Autonomous County has 4 towns, 5 townships and 1 ethnic township.

4 towns

- Mengdong (勐董镇)
- Yanshuai (岩帅镇)
- Mengsheng (勐省镇)
- Mangka (芒卡镇)

5 townships

- Danjia (单甲乡)
- Nuoliang (糯良乡)
- Menglai (勐来乡)
- Banhong (班洪乡)
- Banlao (班老乡)

1 ethnic township

- Mengjiao Dai Yi and Lahu Ethnic Township (勐角傣族彝族拉祜族乡)

== Population ==
Ethnic Composition of Cangyuan Va Autonomous County
| | National name | Wa | Han | Dai | Yi | Lahu | Others | Total |
|---|---|---|---|---|---|---|---|---|
| 2020 | Population | 124015 | 20753 | 7445 | 2590 | 3425 | 2034 | 160262 |
| 2020 | Proportion of total population (%) | 77.38 | 12.95 | 4.65 | 1.62 | 2.14 | 1.27 | 100% |
| 2020 | Proportion of minority population (%) | 88.89 | --- | 5.34 | 1.86 | 2.46 | 1.46 | --- |

== Climate ==
Climate data for Cangyuan, elevation 1,278 m (4,193 ft), (1991–2020 normals, extremes 1981–2010)
| Month | Jan | Feb | Mar | Apr | May | Jun | Jul | Aug | Sep | Oct | Nov | Dec | Year |
|---|---|---|---|---|---|---|---|---|---|---|---|---|---|
| Record high °C (°F) | 27.1 (80.8) | 29.9 (85.8) | 30.6 (87.1) | 33.4 (92.1) | 33.9 (93.0) | 34.1 (93.4) | 31.1 (88.0) | 31.4 (88.5) | 30.7 (87.3) | 30.2 (86.4) | 27.6 (81.7) | 26.0 (78.8) | 34.1 (93.4) |
| Mean daily maximum °C (°F) | 21.0 (69.8) | 23.3 (73.9) | 26.4 (79.5) | 28.1 (82.6) | 27.8 (82.0) | 26.9 (80.4) | 26.0 (78.8) | 26.8 (80.2) | 27.0 (80.6) | 25.7 (78.3) | 23.5 (74.3) | 21.1 (70.0) | 25.3 (77.5) |
| Daily mean °C (°F) | 11.7 (53.1) | 13.3 (55.9) | 16.6 (61.9) | 19.3 (66.7) | 21.2 (70.2) | 22.1 (71.8) | 21.9 (71.4) | 22.0 (71.6) | 21.3 (70.3) | 19.3 (66.7) | 15.7 (60.3) | 12.6 (54.7) | 18.1 (64.6) |
| Mean daily minimum °C (°F) | 5.7 (42.3) | 5.9 (42.6) | 8.9 (48.0) | 12.8 (55.0) | 16.6 (61.9) | 19.3 (66.7) | 19.5 (67.1) | 19.3 (66.7) | 18.3 (64.9) | 16.0 (60.8) | 11.5 (52.7) | 7.8 (46.0) | 13.5 (56.2) |
| Record low °C (°F) | −1.2 (29.8) | −1.4 (29.5) | 1.9 (35.4) | 5.2 (41.4) | 9.8 (49.6) | 14.5 (58.1) | 14.7 (58.5) | 14.3 (57.7) | 10.0 (50.0) | 6.4 (43.5) | 3.5 (38.3) | −1.5 (29.3) | −1.5 (29.3) |
| Average precipitation mm (inches) | 31.5 (1.24) | 16.1 (0.63) | 20.9 (0.82) | 72.4 (2.85) | 161.5 (6.36) | 292.3 (11.51) | 346.7 (13.65) | 292.7 (11.52) | 208.4 (8.20) | 157.9 (6.22) | 58.1 (2.29) | 18.0 (0.71) | 1,676.5 (66) |
| Average precipitation days (≥ 0.1 mm) | 3.0 | 3.2 | 4.5 | 10.9 | 17.6 | 25.4 | 28.6 | 26.7 | 22.0 | 16.0 | 6.7 | 3.5 | 168.1 |
| Average relative humidity (%) | 78 | 72 | 68 | 72 | 79 | 86 | 89 | 88 | 87 | 86 | 84 | 82 | 81 |
| Mean monthly sunshine hours | 198.3 | 216.6 | 234.1 | 204.3 | 174.0 | 103.2 | 70.8 | 95.4 | 122.4 | 133.2 | 160.7 | 170.2 | 1,883.2 |
| Percentage possible sunshine | 59 | 67 | 63 | 54 | 42 | 26 | 17 | 24 | 34 | 37 | 49 | 51 | 44 |
Source: China Meteorological Administration
