= Manhero =

Manhero မန့်ဟီးရိုးမြို့ Máñhìyoù myoú man.hi:rui:mrui. Manhlyoe
- Town
- Location in Myanmar
- Coordinates: 23°57′01″N 97°48′00″E
- Country: Myanmar
- State: Shan State
- District: Muse District
- Township: Muse Township

Population (2014)
  - Town: 6,787
  - Urban: 1,438
  - Rural: 5,349
- Time zone: UTC+6.30 (MST)

Manhero, Manhlyoe (Burmese: မန့်ဟီးရိုးမြို့ man.hi:rui:mrui. Máñhìyoù myoú) or Man Hio is a town in Muse Township, Muse District, Shan State, Myanmar.

The village shares an open border with Yinjing-zhai, China. Students cross the border to attend a primary school in China, where Chinese pupils (mostly ethnic Dai) wear Shan (Dai) ethnic costumes while Shan pupils (mostly ethnic Han Chinese) wear Bamar ethnic uniforms.
