= Banhong Township =

- Township

Chinese transcription(s)
  - Simplified: 班洪乡
  - Traditional: 班洪鄉
  - Pinyin: Bānhóng Xiāng
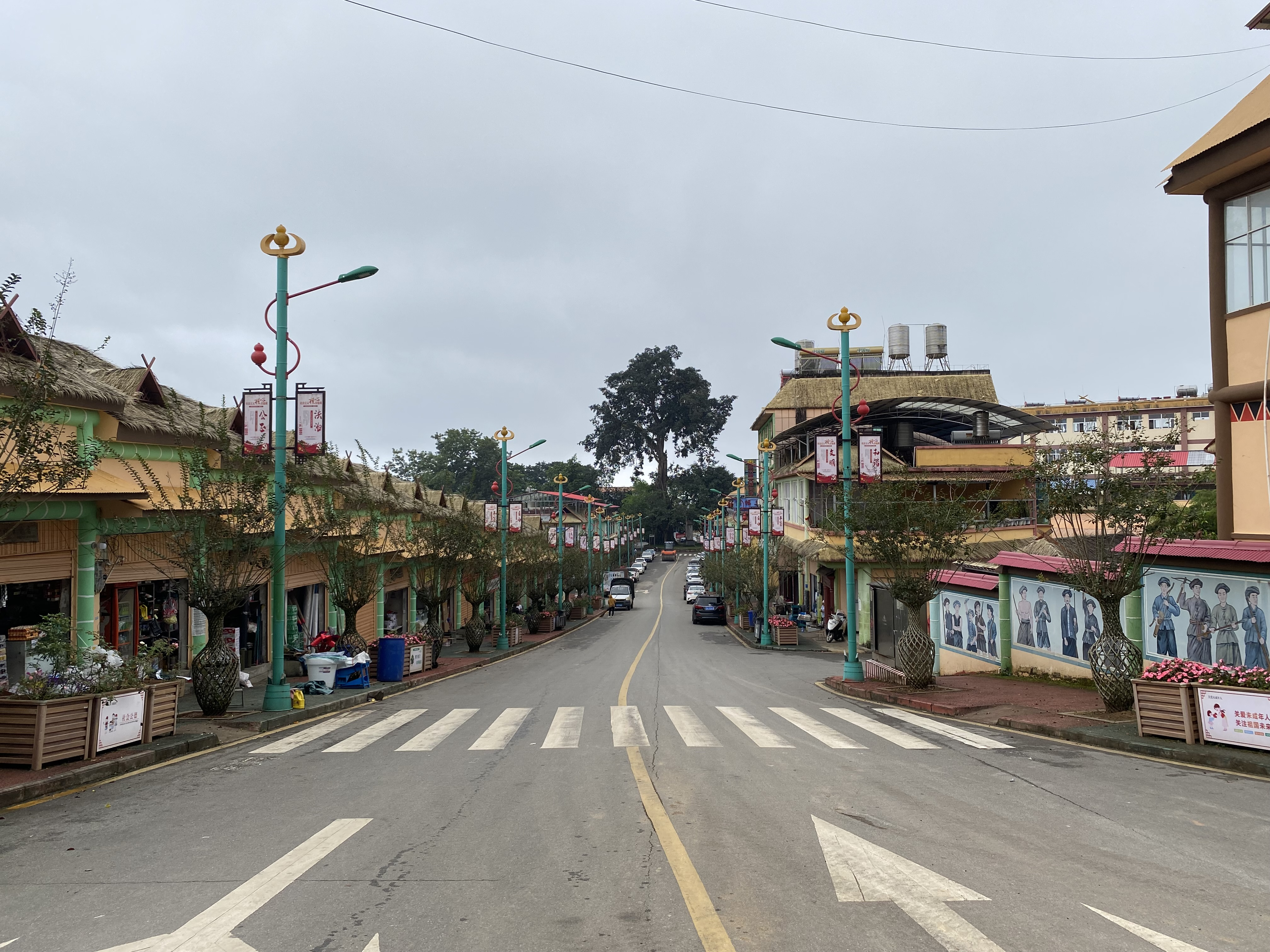
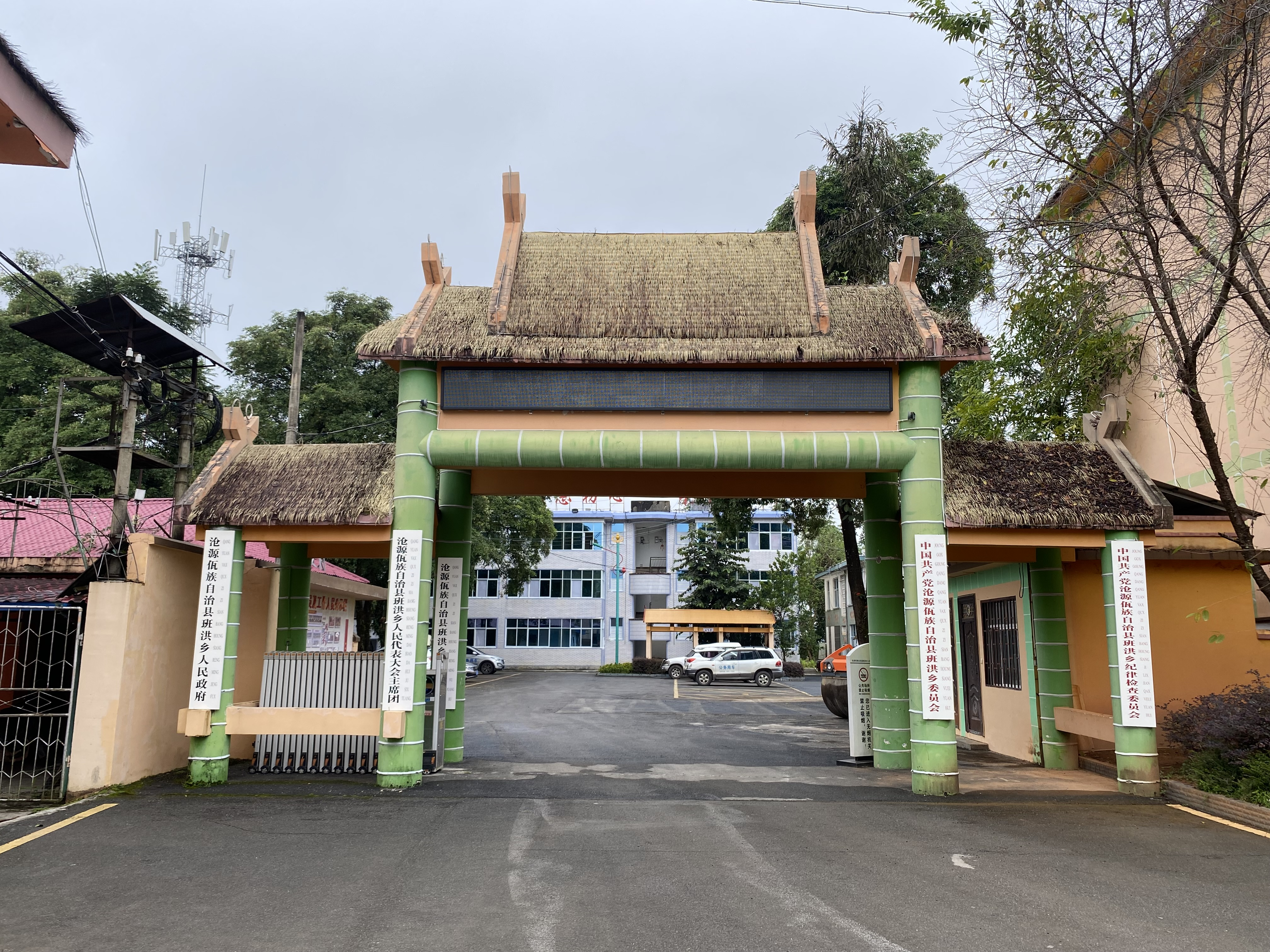
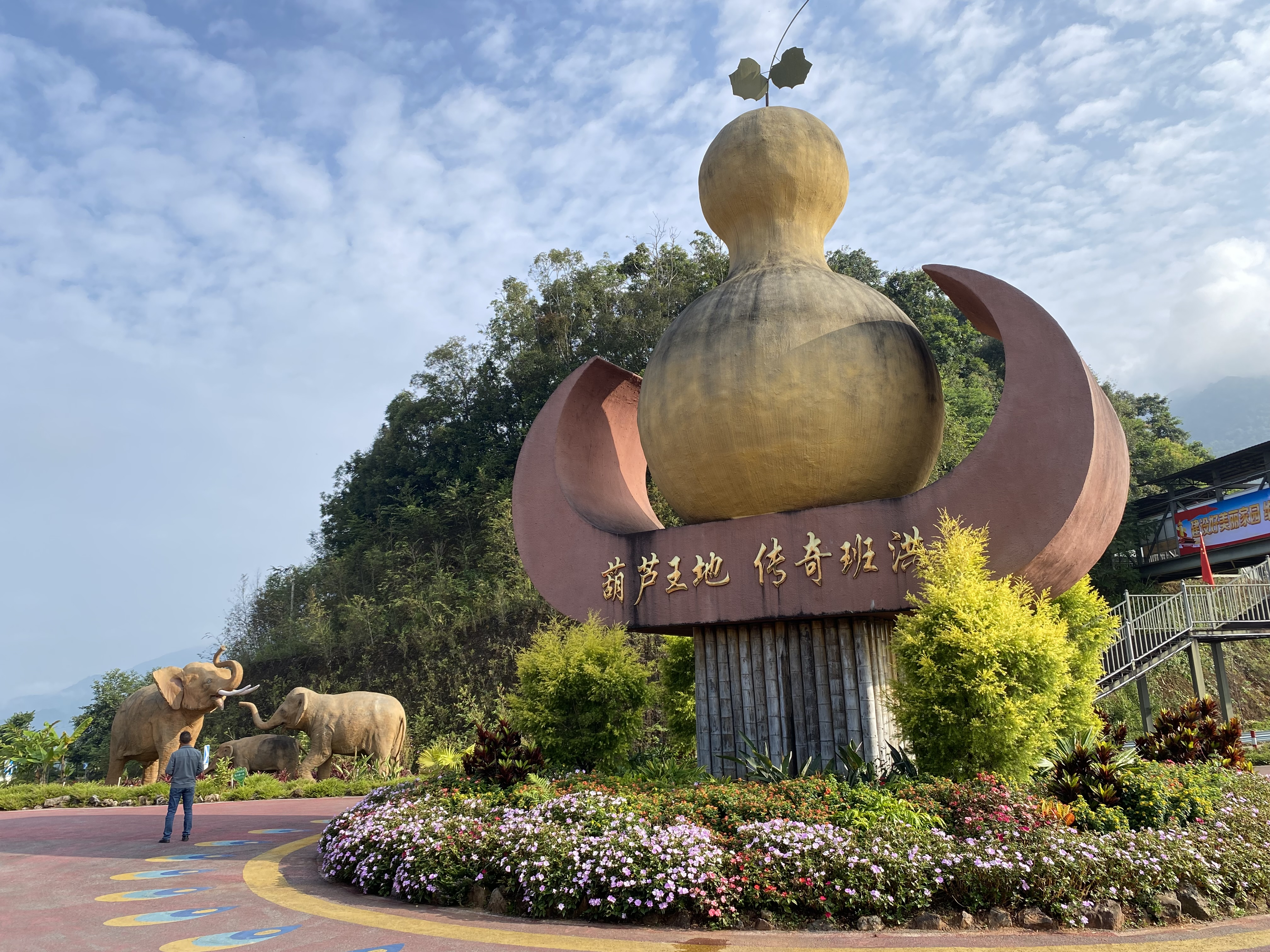
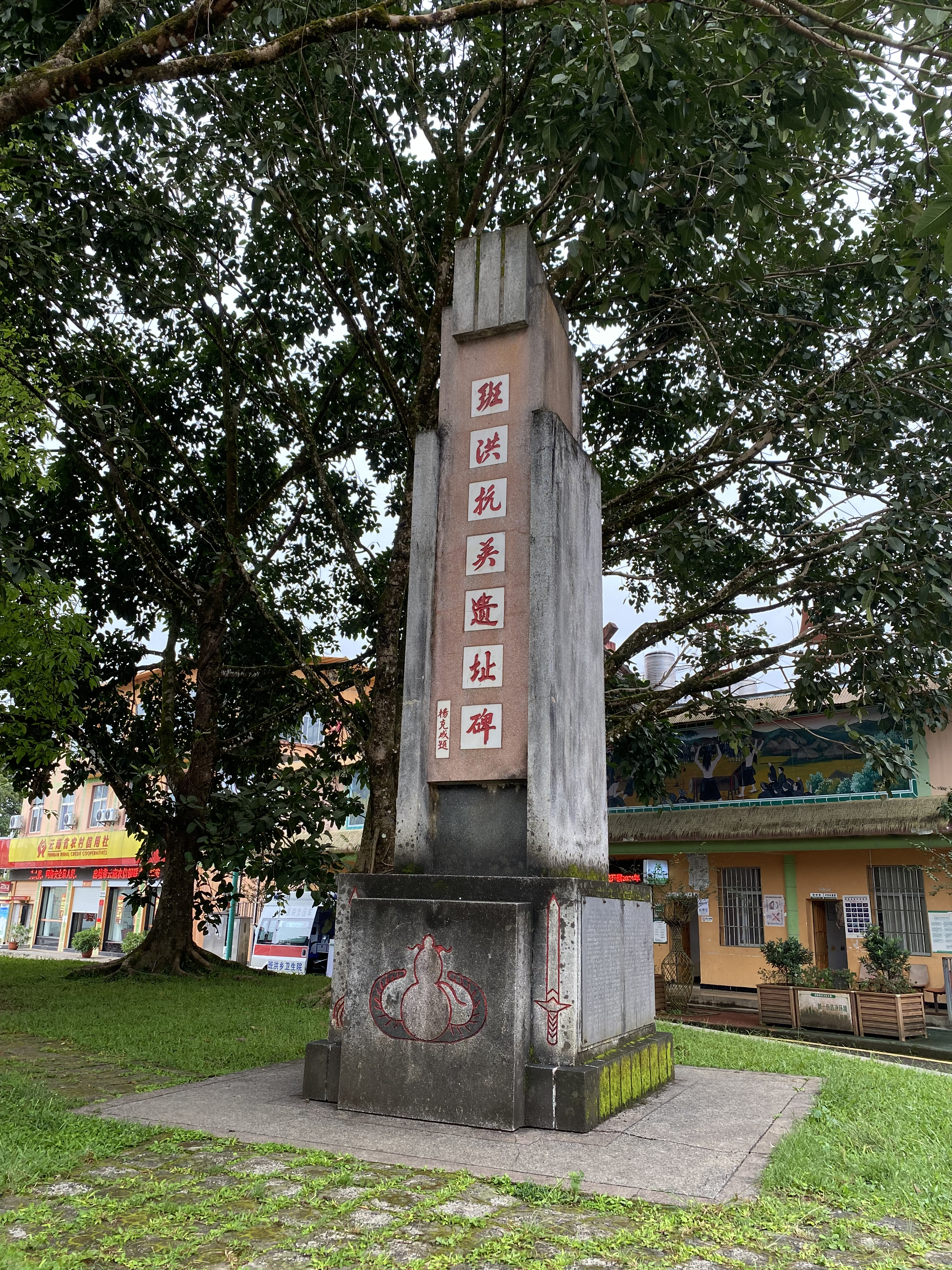
- Main street Township hall Hulu Wangdi Scenic Area Anti-British Site Stele

- Location in Yunnan.
- Coordinates: 23°17′33″N 99°05′53″E
- Country: China
- Province: Yunnan
- Prefecture-level city: Lincang
- County: Cangyuan

Area
  - Total: 332.754 km^{2} (128.477 sq mi)

Population (2010)
  - Total: 10,587
  - Density: 31.816/km^{2} (82.404/sq mi)
- Time zone: UTC+8 (China Standard)
- Postal code: 677402
- Area code: 0883

Banhong Township (Chinese: 班洪乡, Parauk: Pangrung) is a rural township in Cangyuan Va Autonomous County, Yunnan, China. The township is bordered to the north by Mengding Town and Hepai Township, to the east by Menglai Township and Mengjiao Township, to the south by Mengdong Town and Mongmao Township, and to the west by Mangka Town and Banlao Township. As of the 2010 census it had a population of 10,587 and an area of 332.754 square kilometres (128.477 sq mi).

== Name ==
The word Banhong is transliteration in Dai language. "Ban" means level ground and "Hong" means banyan.

== History ==
Historically, Banhong was a tribal settlement. In 1891, the Qing government bestowed on Hu Yushan (Chinese: 胡玉山) the title "Tudusi". On June 18, 1941, the west of the Banhong Village belonged to Burma. After the establishment of the Communist State, Banhong District was established. The last Tusi is Hu Zhonghua (Chinese: 胡忠华). On January 25, 1960, China and Burma sign bilateral boundary division agreements, the boundary of the two countries was determined. In 1968 it was renamed Banhong Commune and then Wuyi Commune in the next year. It was upgraded to a township in 1988.

== Administrative division ==
As of 2017, the township is divided into 6 villages: Banhong (Chinese: 班洪), Mangku (Chinese: 芒库), Gongkan (Chinese: 公坎), Fugong (Chinese: 富公), Banmo (Chinese: 班莫), and Nanban (Chinese: 南板).

== Geography ==
The highest point in the township is Mount Wokan which stands 2,605 metres (8,547 ft) above sea level. The lowest point is Fabao, which, at 600 metres (2,000 ft) above sea level.

The Mangku River and Xinya River, tributaries of the Nu River, flow through the township.

The township enjoys a subtropical humid monsoon climate, with an average annual temperature of 20.9 °C (69.6 °F) and an average rainfall of 1,957.4-millimetre (77.06 in).

== Economy ==
Natural rubber, cassava, tea, walnuts and rapeseed are major cash crops.

== Attractions ==
Nangun River Natural Protection Area (Chinese: 南滚河自然保护区) is a national nature reserve in the township.

== Education ==
The township has 6 primary schools and 1 middle school.

== Transportation ==
The Nancang Road passes across the township.
