= Nuoliang Township =

- Township

Chinese transcription(s)
  - Simplified: 糯良乡
  - Traditional: 糯良鄉
  - Pinyin: Nuòliáng Xiāng
- Location in Yunnan
- Coordinates: 23°14′12″N 99°19′47″E
- Country: China
- Province: Yunnan
- County: Cangyuan Va Autonomous County

Area
  - Total: 140.352 km^{2} (54.190 sq mi)

Population (2010)
  - Total: 14,665
  - Density: 104.49/km^{2} (270.62/sq mi)
- Time zone: UTC+8 (China Standard)
- Postal code: 677406
- Area code: 0883

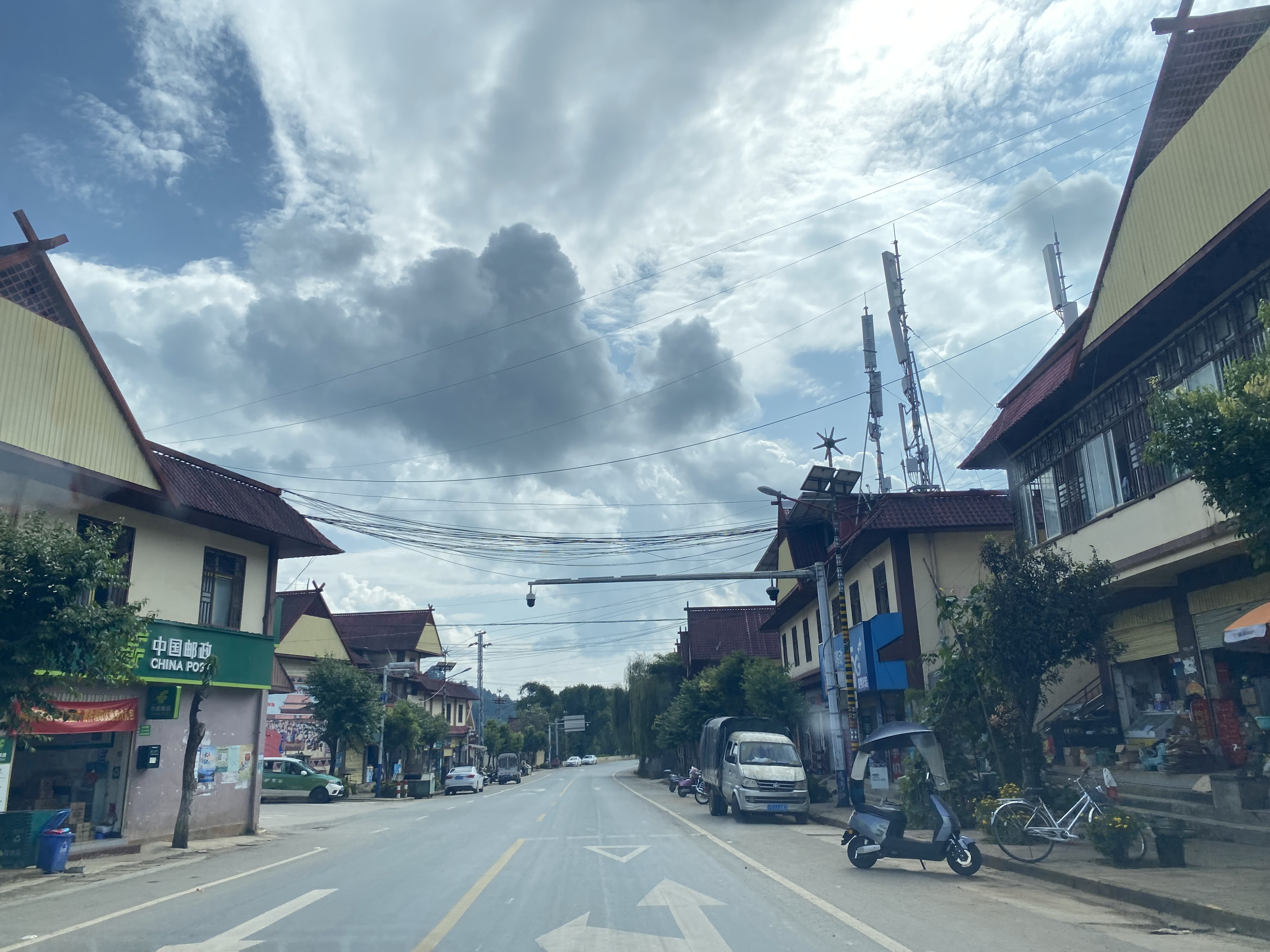
Yunnan Provincial Highway 239, Cangyuan Nuoliang Section

Nuoliang Township (Chinese: 糯良乡) is a rural township in Cangyuan Va Autonomous County, Yunnan, China. As of the 2010 census it had a population of 14,665 and an area of 140.352 square kilometres (54.190 sq mi). The township shares a border with Mengjiao Township to the west, Menglai Township to the northwest, Danjia Township to southeast, Mengsheng Town to the northeast, and Mengdong Town to the southwest.

== Name ==
The word Nuoliang is transliteration in Dai language. "Nuo" means pond and "Liang" means sacrifice. Legend has it that there is a Chinese dragon in the pond. People often worship it.

== History ==
In the early history, the township had always been under Tusi jurisdiction. In 1945 it belonged to Leliang Township. After the founding of the Communist State, it was under the jurisdiction of Mengsheng District. In 1968 it was renamed Mengsheng Commune and was renamed Jiuda Commune in the following year. In 1984, Nuoliang District was established. It was upgraded to a township in 1988.

== Administrative division ==
As of 2017, the township is divided into 8 villages: Nuoliang (Chinese: 糯良村), Heling (Chinese: 贺岭村), Nansa (Chinese: 南撒村), Paqiu (Chinese: 怕秋村), Wengbulao (Chinese: 翁不老村), Bankao (Chinese: 班考村), Papo (Chinese: 怕迫村), and Bawei (Chinese: 坝尾村).

== Geography ==
The highest point in the township is Mount Dahei (Chinese: 大黑山), which, at 2,469 metres (8,100 ft) above sea level. The lowest point is Bawei (Chinese: 坝尾村) which stands 1,100 metres (3,600 ft) above sea level.

The Mengdong River (Chinese: 勐董河) and Paqiu River (Chinese: 怕秋河), tributaries of the Lancang River, flow through the township.

Nansa Reservoir (Chinese: 南撒水库) is the largest body of water in the township.

The township enjoys a subtropical humid monsoon climate, with an average annual temperature of 16 °C (61 °F) and average annual rainfall of 1,499.5-millimetre (59.04 in).

== Economy ==
Nuoliang Township's economy is based on nearby mineral resources and agricultural resources. The region abounds with lead, zinc, copper, iron and limestone. Sugarcane, tobacco, walnut and rapeseed are the main cash crops.

== Education ==
The town has 9 public schools: 8 primary schools and 1 middle school.

== Transportation ==
The Provincial Highway S314 passes across the township.

The Banmeng Expressway (Chinese: 班孟高速公路) is under construction.

The Cangyuan Washan Airport serves the township.
