= Mengsheng =

Mengsheng Town
- Town

Chinese transcription(s)
  - Simplified: 勐省镇
  - Traditional: 勐省鎮
  - Pinyin: Mèngshěng Zhèn
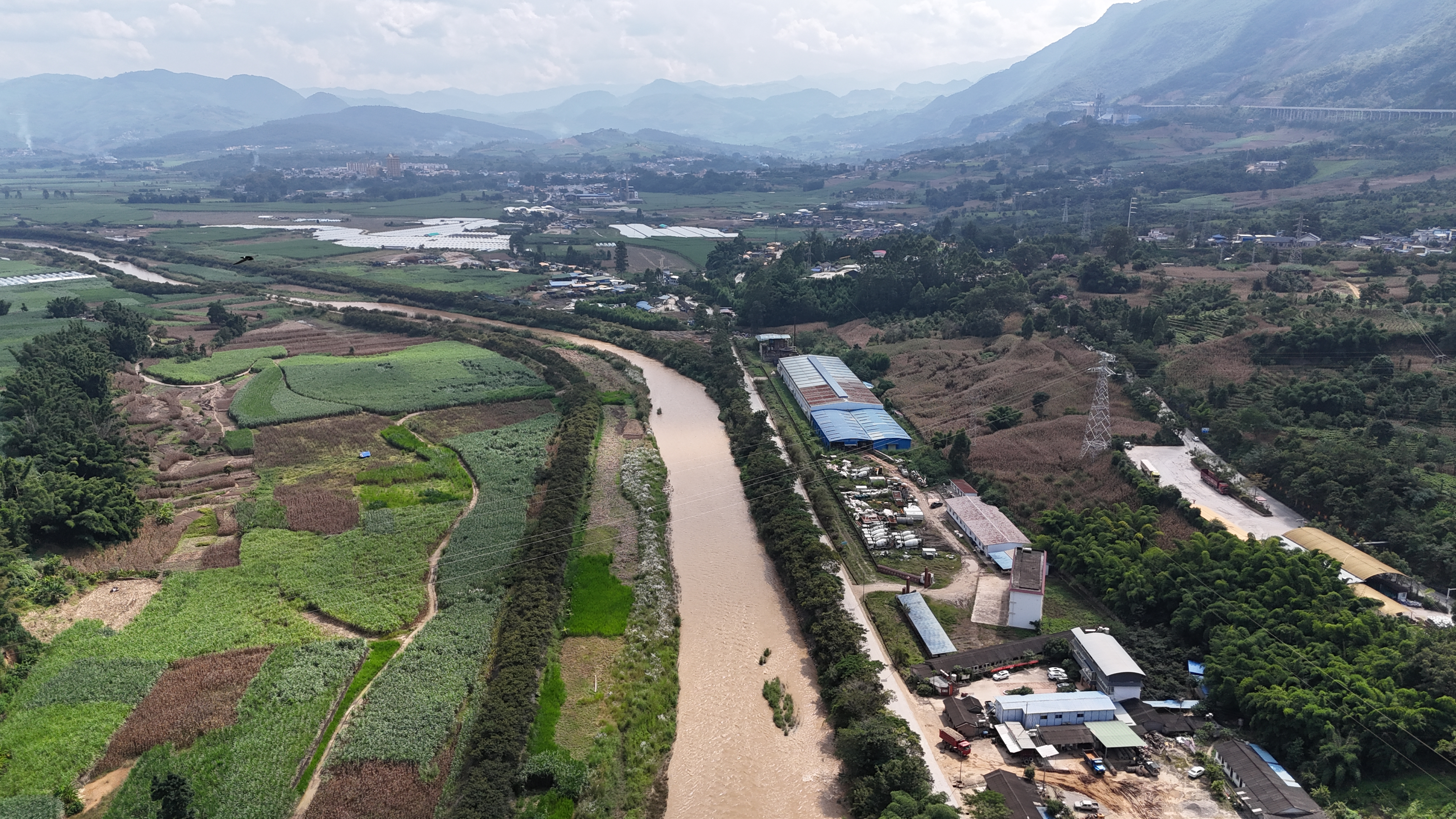
- Xiaohei River across basin of Mengsheng

- Location in Yunnan.
- Coordinates: 23°20′47″N 99°25′20″E
- Country: China
- Province: Yunnan
- County: Cangyuan Va Autonomous County

Area
  - Total: 200.398 km^{2} (77.374 sq mi)

Population (2010)
  - Total: 23,530
  - Density: 117.4/km^{2} (304.1/sq mi)
- Time zone: UTC+8 (China Standard)
- Postal code: 677408
- Area code: 0883

Mengsheng Town (Chinese: 勐省镇) is a rural town in Cangyuan Va Autonomous County, Yunnan, China. The town shares a border with Menglai Township and Nuoliang Township to the west, Yanshuai Town to the east, Gengma Dai and Va Autonomous County to the north, and Danjia Township to the south. As of the 2010 census it had a population of 23,530 and an area of 200.398 square kilometres (77.374 sq mi).

== History ==
Mengsheng Township was established in 1945 by Cangyuan Government. After the founding of the Communist State, Mengsheng District was set up in 1954. Its jurisdiction included today's Mengsheng Town, Nuoliang Township and Menglai Township. In 1968 it was renamed Mengsheng Commune and Jiuda Commune in the next year. It was upgraded to a town in 1988.

== Administrative division ==
As of 2017, the town is divided into 8 villages: Mengsheng Village, Huizhu Village, Mankan Village, Mangyang Village, Yongrang Village, Xiabannai Village, Heping Village, and Nongke Village.

== Geography ==
Mountains located adjacent to and visible from the townsite are: Mount Mankan (Chinese: 满坎山) and Mount Dayanzi (Chinese: 大岩子).

The Lameng River (Chinese: 拉勐河), Hemeng River (Chinese: 贺勐河), Dangpa River (Chinese: 挡怕河), Xiaohei River (Chinese: 小黑江) and Nanbi River (Chinese: 南碧河), tributaries of the Lancang River, flow through the town.

== Economy ==
The town's main industries are agriculture and mining. The main cash crops are sugarcane, tea and oilseed rape.

== Education ==
The town has 12 primary schools and 1 middle school.

== Transportation ==
The Provincial Highway S314 passes across the town.

The town is connected to the Ruili-Menglian Expressway (Chinese: 瑞孟高速公路).
