= Mengjiao Dai, Yi and Lahu Ethnic Township =

- Township

Chinese transcription(s)
  - Simplified: 勐角傣族彝族拉祜族乡
  - Traditional: 勐角傣族彝族拉祜族鄉
  - Pinyin: Mèngjiǎo Dǎizú Yízú Lāhùzú Xiāng
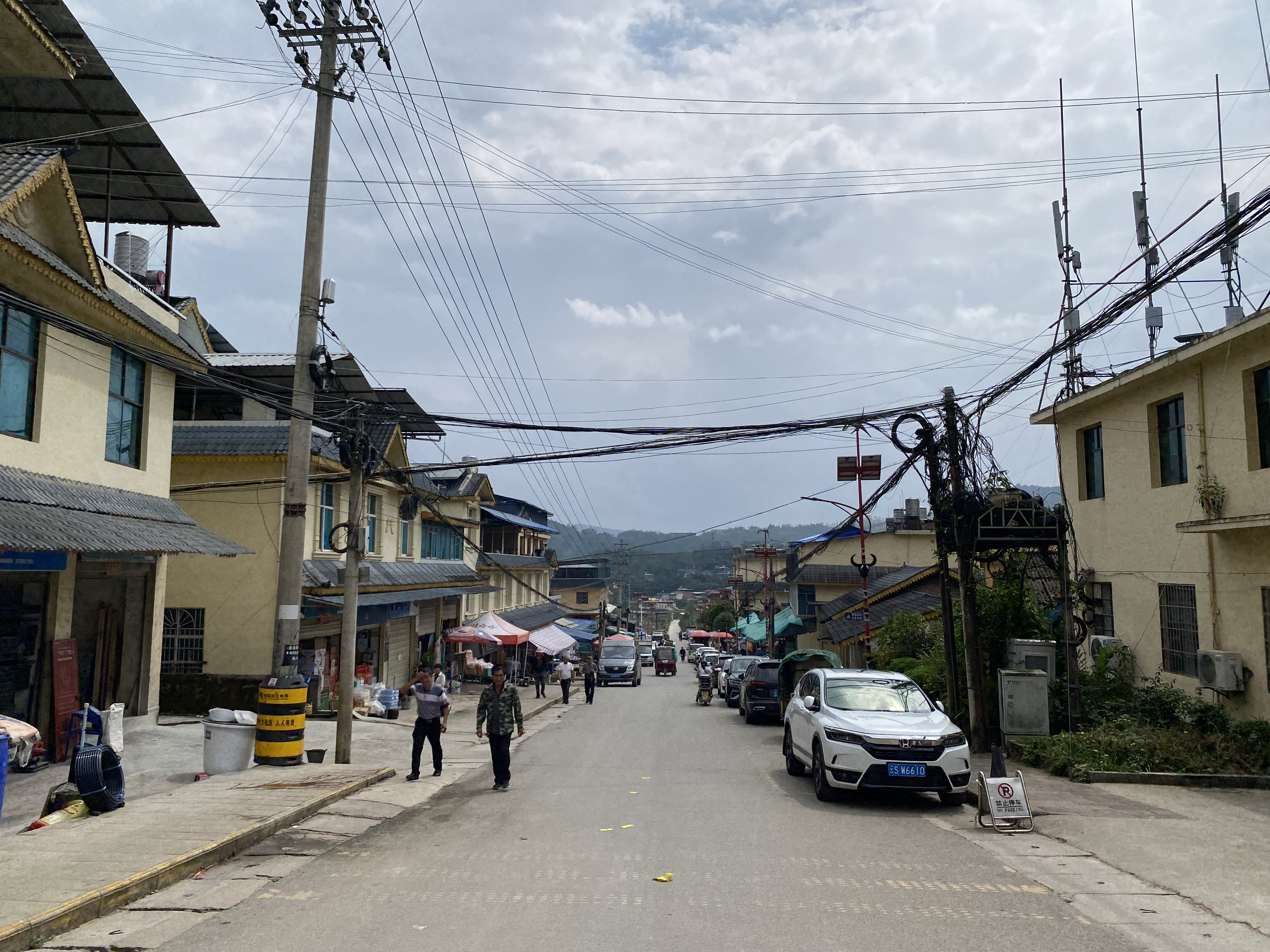
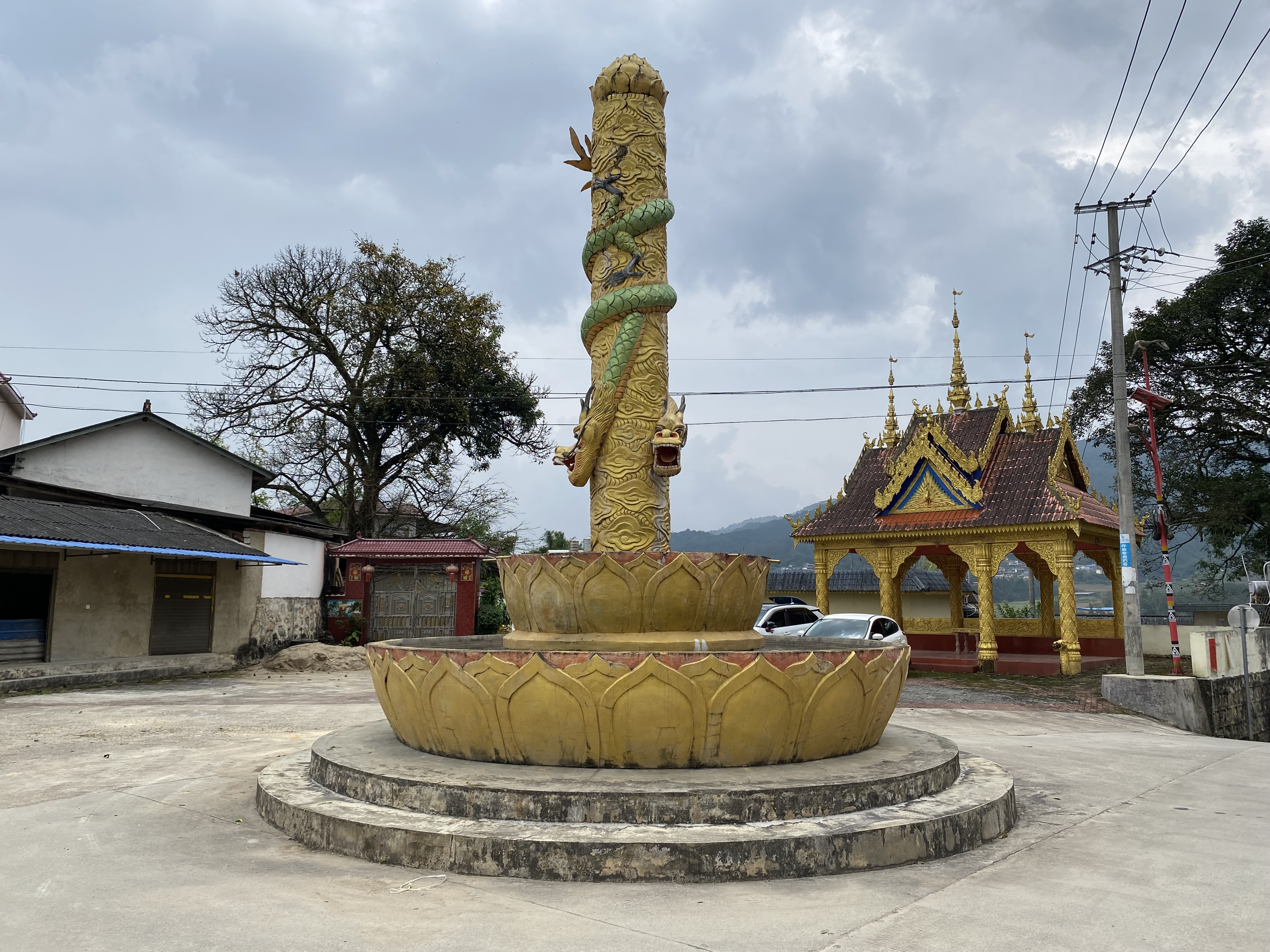
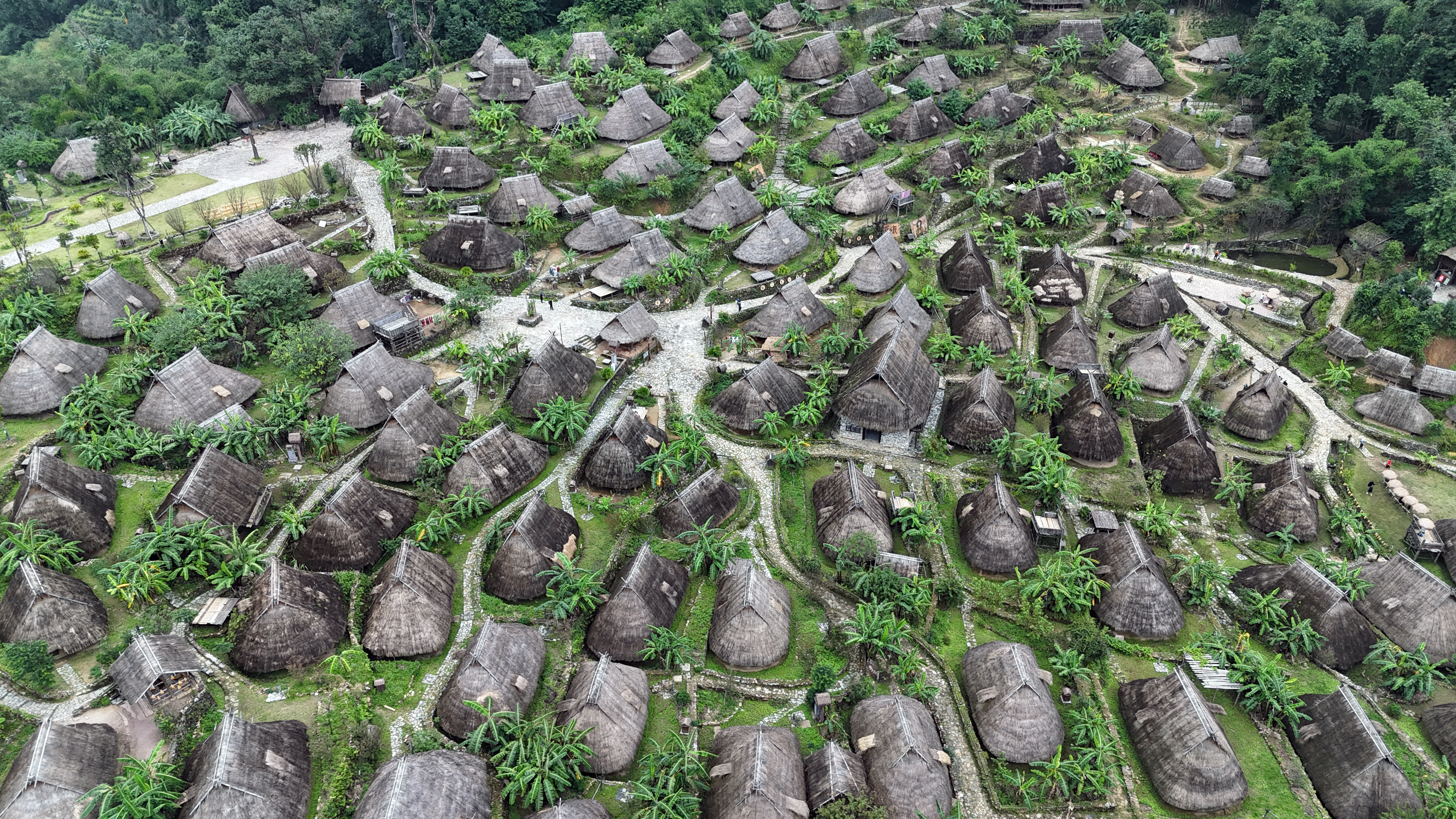
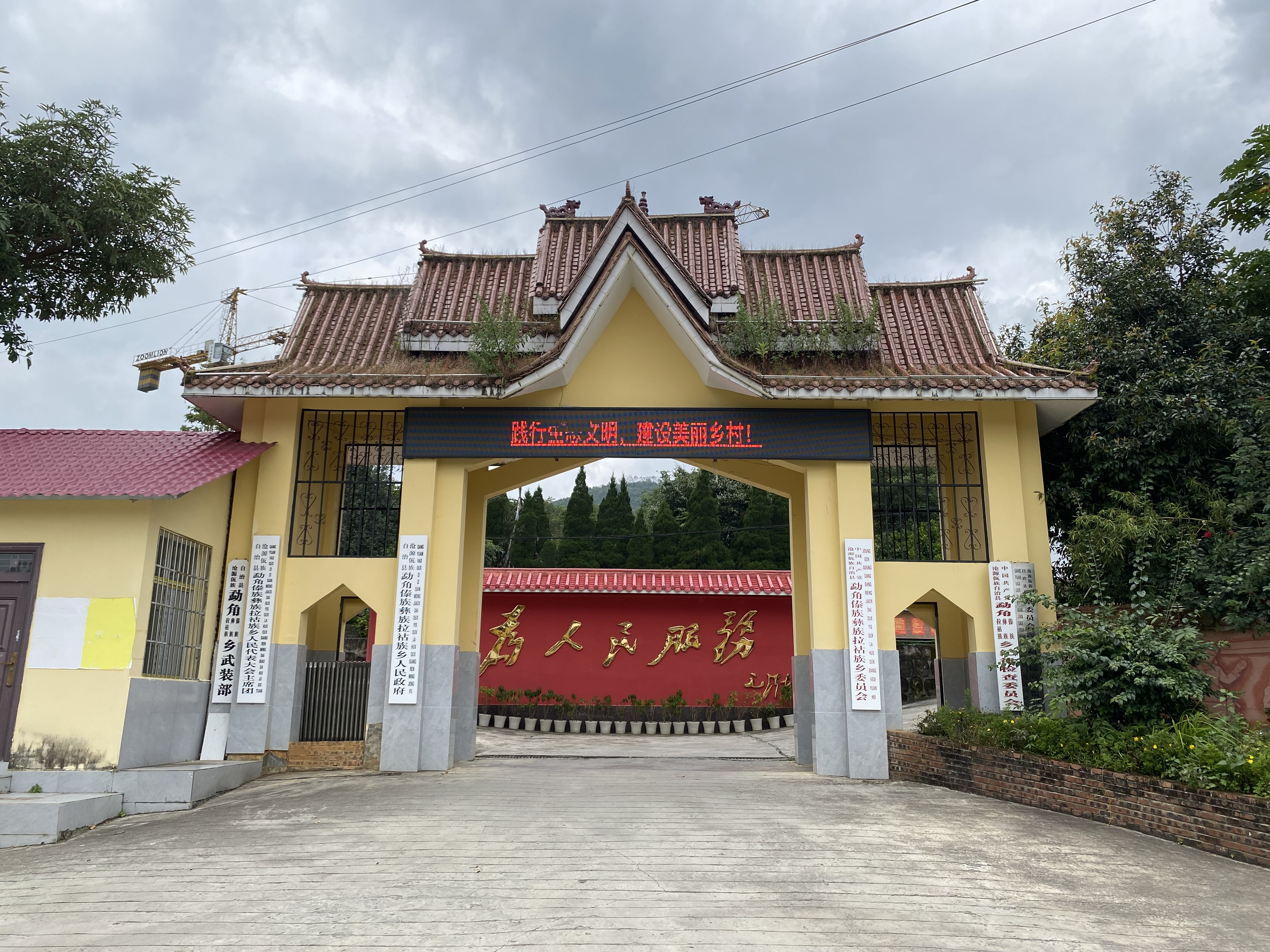
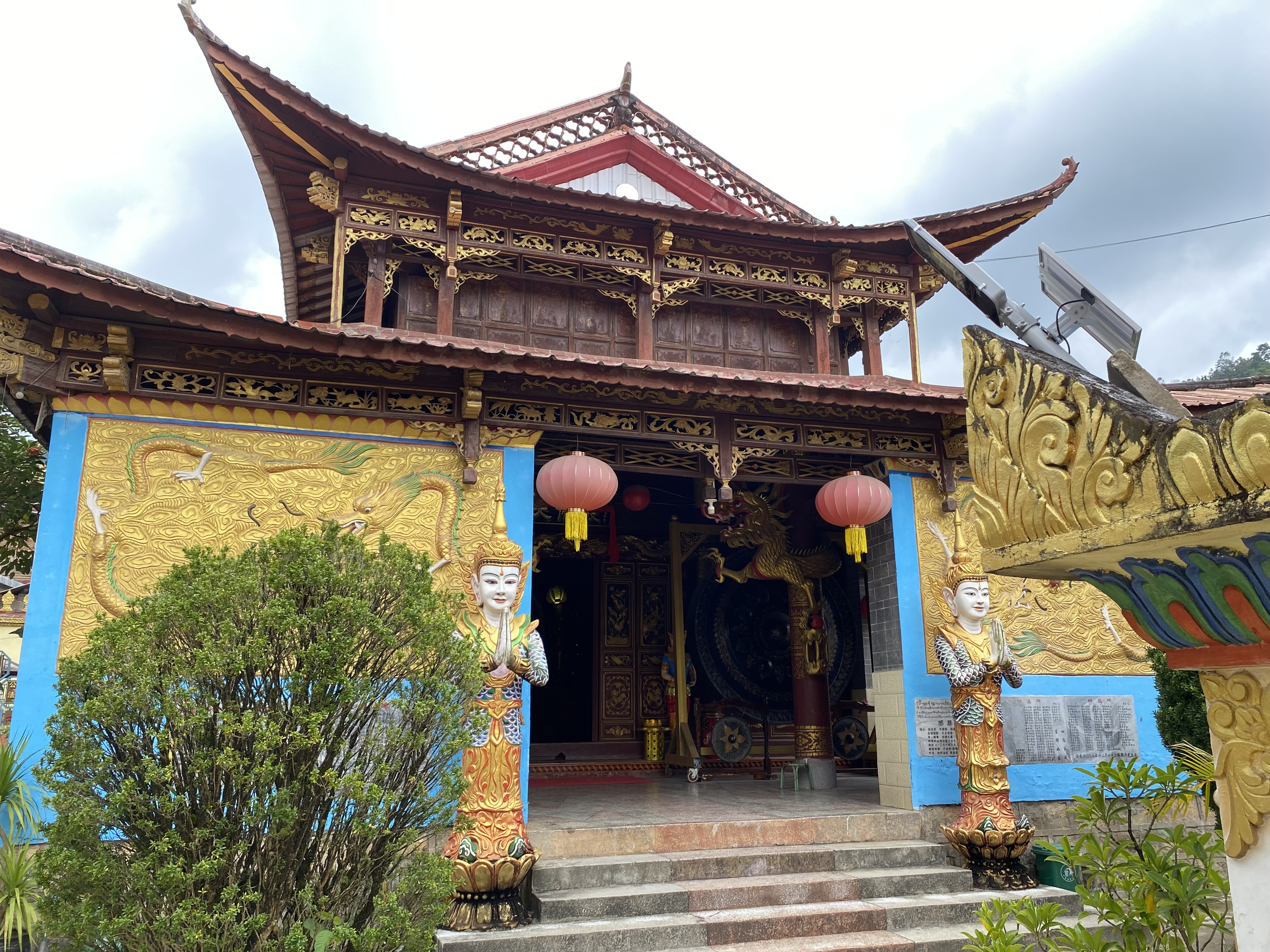
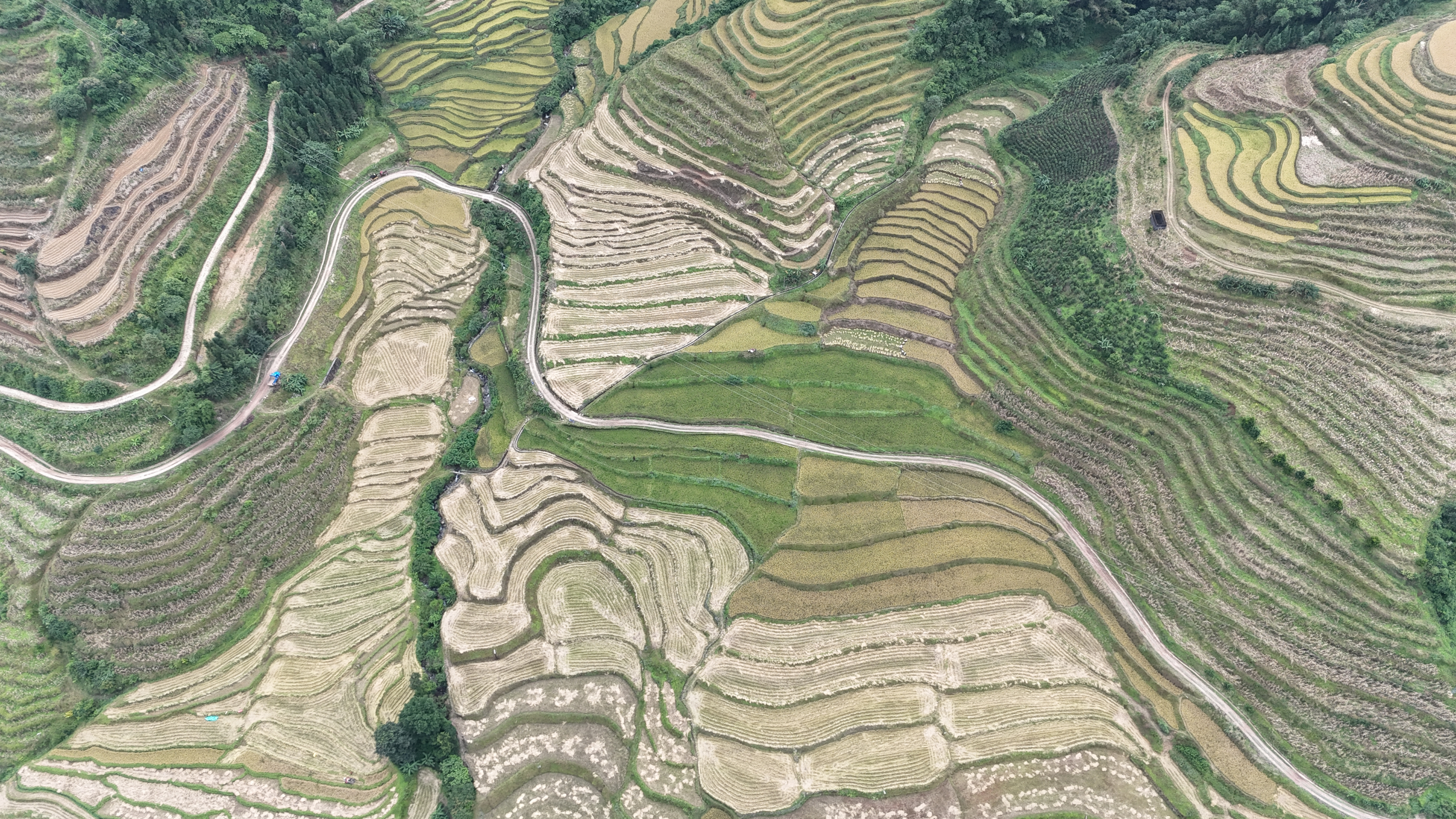
- Main street Heart of Mengjiao Om Din Village Township hall Jinlong Temple Terrace

- Location in Yunnan
- Coordinates: 23°13′50″N 99°14′13″E
- Country: China
- Province: Yunnan
- County: Cangyuan Va Autonomous County

Area
  - Total: 216.75 km^{2} (83.69 sq mi)

Population (2010)
  - Total: 13,990
  - Density: 64.54/km^{2} (167.2/sq mi)
- Time zone: UTC+8 (China Standard)
- Postal code: 677401
- Area code: 0883

Mengjiao Dai, Yi and Lahu Ethnic Township (Chinese: 勐角傣族彝族拉祜族乡), commonly abbreviated as Mengjiao Ethnic Township or Mengjiao Township, is a rural township in Cangyuan Va Autonomous County, Yunnan, China. As of the 2010 census it had a population of 13,990 and an area of 216.75 square kilometres (83.69 sq mi). It is surrounded by Menglai Township on the north, Banhong Township on the west, Nuoliang Township on the east, and Mengdong Town on the south.

== Name ==
The word Mengjiao is transliteration in Dai language. "Mengjiao" means a place to start a family.

== History ==
In the early history, the area had always been under Tusi jurisdiction. Mengjiao was incorporated as a town in 1945, after the Second Sino-Japanese War. After the establishment of the Communist State in 1954, Mengjiao District was established. In 1968 it was renamed Mengjiao Commune and then was renamed Hongzhong Commune in the next year. In 1988 it was upgraded to an ethnic township.

== Administrative division ==
As of 2017, the township is divided into 9 villages: Mengjiao (Chinese: 勐角), Lianhuatang (Chinese: 莲花塘), Kongjiao (Chinese: 控角), Wengding (Chinese: 翁丁), Mengka (Chinese: 勐卡), Manggong (Chinese: 芒公), Nuozhang (Chinese: 糯掌), Kongjing (Chinese: 控井), and Menggan (Chinese: 勐甘).

== Geography ==
The highest point in the township is Mount Wokan (Chinese: 窝坎大山), which, at 2,605 metres (8,547 ft) above sea level.

The largest body of water is Wengding Reservoir (Chinese: 翁丁水库).

The township enjoys a subtropical humid monsoon climate, with an average annual temperature of 18.5 °C (65.3 °F) and average annual rainfall of 1,602.1-millimetre (63.07 in).

== Economy ==
The area is rich in coal mines.

Natural rubber, cassava, tea, walnuts and rapeseed are major cash crops.

== Education ==
The town has 8 primary schools and 1 middle school.

== Religion ==
Jinlong Temple is a Buddhist temple in the township.

== Transportation ==
The S314 Xiaocang Provincial Highway (Chinese: S314小沧公路) passes across the township.

== Attractions ==
Part of the township belongs to Nangun River Natural Protection Area (Chinese: 南滚河自然保护区).
