= Danjia Township =

- Township

Chinese transcription(s)
  - Simplified: 单甲乡
  - Traditional: 單甲鄉
  - Pinyin: Dānjiǎ Xiāng
- Location in Yunnan
- Coordinates: 23°13′04″N 99°25′30″E
- Country: China
- Province: Yunnan
- County: Cangyuan Va Autonomous County

Area
  - Total: 203.736 km^{2} (78.663 sq mi)

Population (2010)
  - Total: 11,080
  - Density: 54.38/km^{2} (140.9/sq mi)
- Time zone: UTC+8 (China Standard)
- Postal code: 677407
- Area code: 0883

Danjia Township (Chinese: 单甲乡) is a rural township in Cangyuan Va Autonomous County, Yunnan, China. It borders Mengsheng Town and Yanshuai Town in the north, Mengdong Town and Nuoliang Township in the west, Xuelin Township of Lancang Lahu Autonomous County in the east, and Mong Mau district of Burma in the south. As of the 2010 census it had a population of 11,080 and an area of 203.736 square kilometres (78.663 sq mi).

== Name ==
The word Danjia is transliteration in Wa language. Dan means river source and Jia means curse.

== History ==
In 1968 Danjia was renamed Danjia Commune and then renamed Xiangyang Commune in the next year. It reverted to its former name of Danjia Commune in 1971. In 1984, Danjia District was established. It was upgraded to a township in 1988.

In April 2017, Anye Village was listed among the second batch of "Characteristic Villages of Ethnic Minorities in China" by the State Council of China.

== Administrative division ==
As of 2017, the township is divided into 6 villages: Danjia Village, Pajie Village, Yonggai Village, Anye Village, Gaduo Village, and Yongwu Village.

== Geography ==
Mountains located adjacent to and visible from the townsite are: Mount Dahei (大黑山), Mount Andun (安敦山), and Mount Bangpen (邦盆山). The highest point in the township is Mount Dahei which stands 2,469 metres (8,100 ft) above sea level. The lowest point is Yongwu (永武) which stands 1,480 metres (4,860 ft) above sea level. .

The Lameng River and Dongding River, both are tributaries of the Lancang River, flow through the town.

Dongding Reservoir is the largest body of water in the township.

== Economy ==
The local economy is primarily based upon agriculture and local industry. Sugarcane, tea, tobacco, blueberry, cherry and myrica rubra are the main cash crops.

== Education ==
The town has one middle school and nine primary schools.
