= Jinlong Temple =

Buddhist temple in Yunnan, China

- 金龙寺
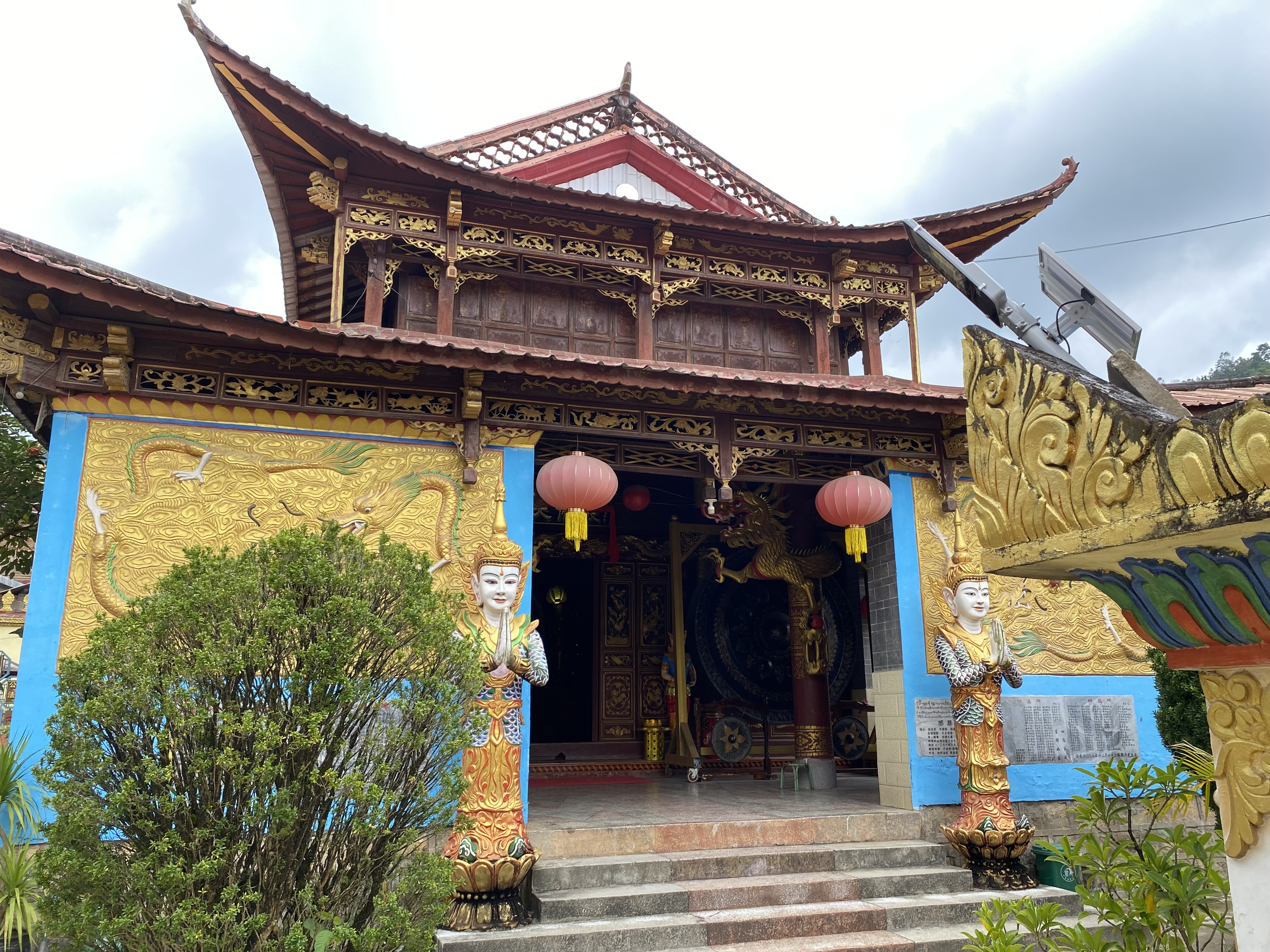
- Jinlong Temple.

- Location within Yunnan

Religion
- Affiliation: Buddhism
- Deity: Theravada
- Leadership: Tikadaxi (提卡达希)

Location
- Location: Mengjiao Dai, Yi and Lahu People Township, Cangyuan Va Autonomous County, Yunnan
- Country: China
- Interactive map of Jinlong Temple
- Coordinates: 23°14′16″N 99°14′43″E

Architecture
- Style: Chinese architecture
- Established: 1380
- Completed: 1980 (reconstruction)

Jinlong Temple (simplified Chinese: 金龙寺; traditional Chinese: 金龍寺; pinyin: Jīnlóng Sì) is a Buddhist temple located in Mengjiao Township of Cangyuan Va Autonomous County, Yunnan, China.

== History ==
Jinlong Temple was first established in 1380, at the dawn of Ming dynasty (1368–1644), the modern temple was founded in 1980. Jinlong Temple was completely destroyed by the Red Guards in the ten-year Cultural Revolution. On November 6, 1988, Jinlong Temple was devastated by a catastrophic earthquake. The Main Hall was rebuilt in 2001 and the Shanmen was rebuilt in 2015.

== Architecture ==
Covering an area of 13,333.33 square metres (3.29474 acres), Jinlong Temple has 6 halls and rooms.

== Abbot ==
The current abbot is Tikadaxi (提卡达希). He is the managing director of the China Buddhist Association and vice-president of Yunnan Buddhist Association.
