= Menglai Township =

- Township

Chinese transcription(s)
  - Simplified: 勐来乡
  - Traditional: 勐來鄉
  - Pinyin: Mènglái Xiāng
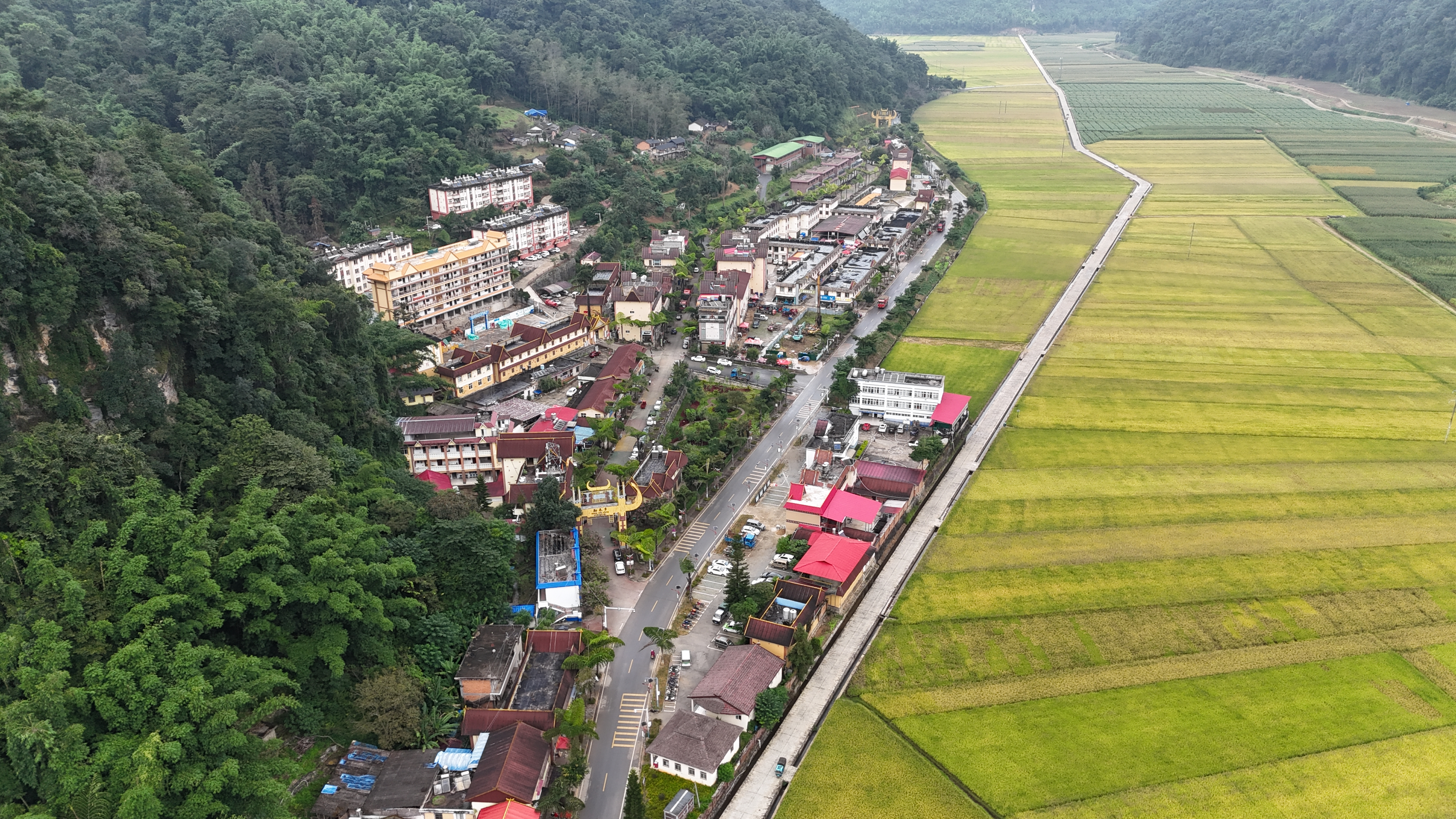
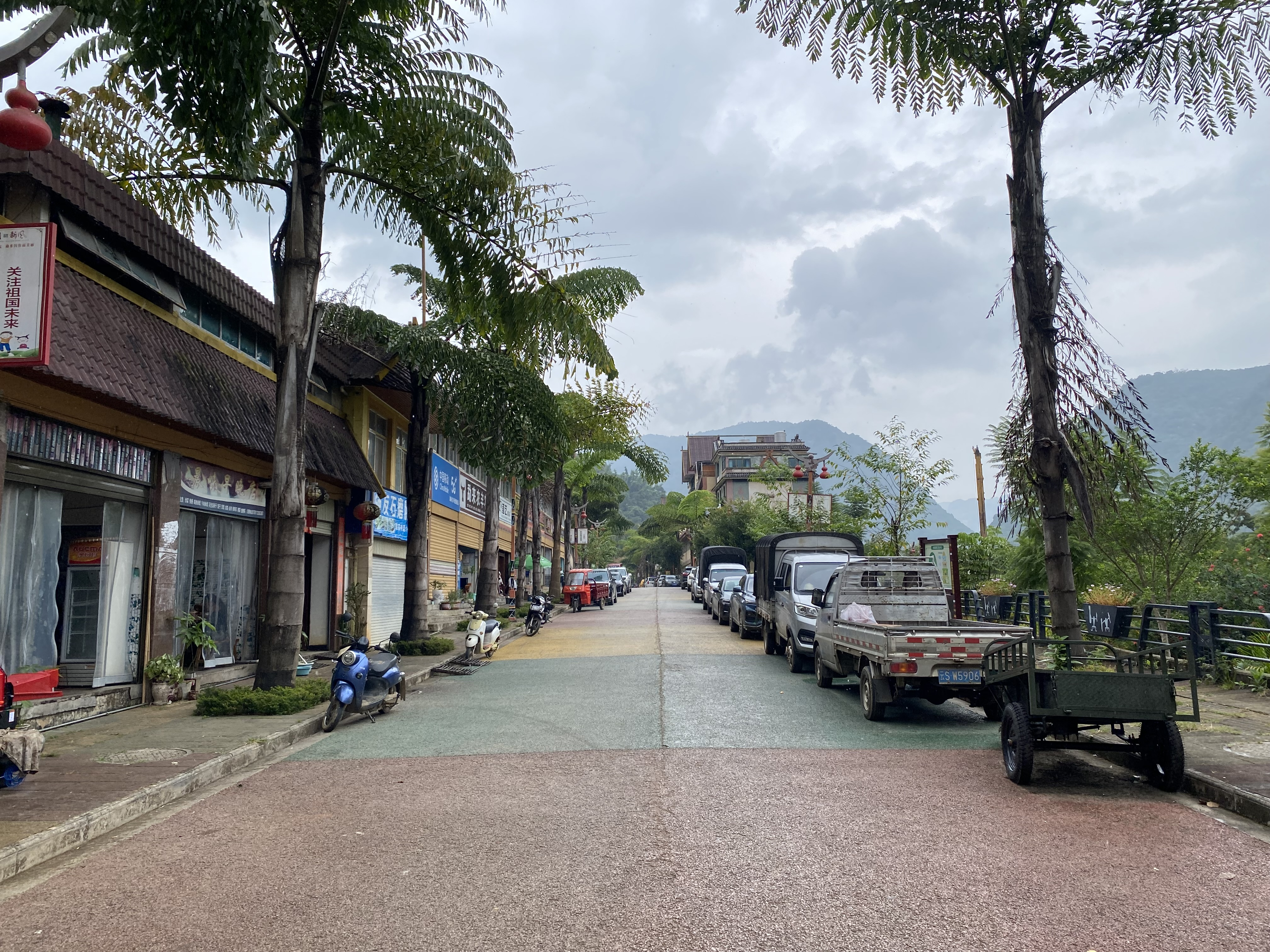
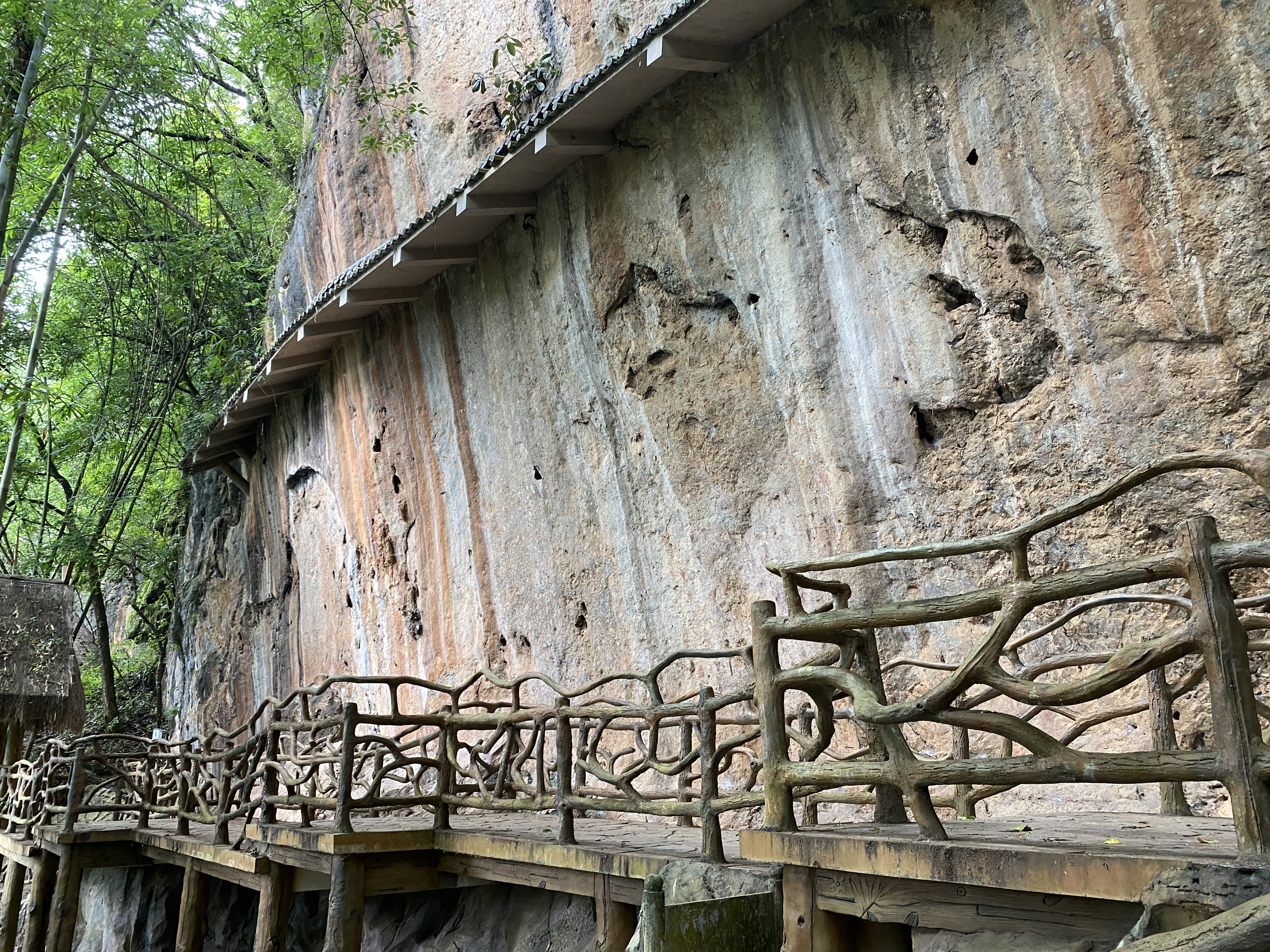
- Skyline of township Main street Cangyuan Rock Paintings

- Location in Yunnan
- Coordinates: 23°15′59″N 99°17′25″E
- Country: China
- Province: Yunnan
- County: Cangyuan Va Autonomous County

Area
  - Total: 188.094 km^{2} (72.623 sq mi)

Population (2010)
  - Total: 14,443
  - Density: 76.786/km^{2} (198.88/sq mi)
- Time zone: UTC+8 (China Standard)
- Postal code: 677405
- Area code: 0883

Menglai Township (Chinese: 勐来乡) is a rural township in Cangyuan Va Autonomous County, Yunnan, China. As of the 2010 census it had a population of 14,443 and an area of 188.094 square kilometres (72.623 sq mi). It borders Gengma Dai and Va Autonomous County in the north, Mengsheng Town in the east, Nuoliang Township and Mengjiao Township in the south, and Banhong Township in the west.

== Name ==
The word Menglai is transliteration in Wa language. "Meng" means basin and "Lai" means small.

== History ==
In the early history, the township had always been under Tusi jurisdiction. In 1984 Menglai District was established. It was upgraded to a township in 1988.

== Administrative division ==
As of 2017, the township is divided into 9 villages: Minliang (Chinese: 民良村), Yong'an (Chinese: 永安村), Dinglai (Chinese: 丁来村), Gongnong (Chinese: 公弄村), Yingge (Chinese: 英格村), Banlie (Chinese: 班列村), Menglai (Chinese: 勐来村), Gongsa (Chinese: 公撒村), and Manlai (Chinese: 曼来村).

== Geography ==
There are a number of popular mountains located immediately adjacent to the townsite which include Mount Wokan (Chinese: 窝坎大山); Mount Bankao (Chinese: 班考大山); and Mount Gongda (Chinese: 公答山). The highest point in the township is Mount Wokan which stands 2,605 metres (8,547 ft) above sea level. The lowest point is Yong'an Villager, which, at 1,050 metres (3,440 ft) above sea level.

The Mengdong River (Chinese: 勐董河) and Dangpa River (Chinese: 挡怕河), tributaries of the Lancang River, flow through the township.

The township enjoys a subtropical humid monsoon climate, with an average annual temperature of 17.2 °C (63.0 °F) and average annual rainfall of 1,671.5-millimetre (65.81 in).

== Economy ==
Menglai Township's economy is based on nearby mineral resources and agricultural resources. The region abounds with lead, zinc, manganese, coal and iron. Sugarcane, tea, tobacco and rapeseed are the main cash crops.

== Education ==
The township has 10 public schools: 9 primary schools and 1 middle school.

== Attractions ==
Part of the township belongs to Nangun River Natural Protection Area (Chinese: 南滚河自然保护区).

Cangyuan rock painting (Chinese: 沧源崖画) is a famous scenic spot in the township.
