= Yanshuai =

Yanshuai Town
- Town

Chinese transcription(s)
  - Simplified: 岩帅镇
  - Traditional: 岩帥鎮
  - Pinyin: Yánshuài Zhèn
- Location in Yunnan.
- Coordinates: 23°13′44″N 99°35′34″E
- Country: China
- Province: Yunnan
- County: Cangyuan Va Autonomous County

Area
  - Total: 434.995 km^{2} (167.953 sq mi)

Population (2010)
  - Total: 32,486
  - Density: 74.681/km^{2} (193.42/sq mi)
- Time zone: UTC+8 (China Standard)
- Postal code: 677411
- Area code: 0883

Yanshuai Town (Chinese: 岩帅镇) is a rural town in Cangyuan Va Autonomous County, Yunnan, China. The town is bordered to the north by Gengma Dai and Va Autonomous County, to the east by Shuangjiang Lahu, Va, Blang and Dai Autonomous County and Lancang Lahu Autonomous County, to the south by Xuelin Township of Lancang Lahu Autonomous County, to the west by Danjia Township and Mengsheng Town. As of the 2010 census it had a population of 32,486 and an area of 434.995 square kilometres (167.953 sq mi).

== Name ==
The word Yanshuai is transliteration in Wa language. Yanshuai is named in memory of Zhao Yanshuai (Chinese: 赵岩帅), the founder of Yanshuai stockaded village.

== History ==
Yanshuai is a tribe of the Wa people. In 1890, the Qing army marched to the area. Yanshuai District was established in 1936. It was upgraded to a town 1945. In 1949, the Communist Party established the Cangyuan County Provisional People's Government. On June 15, 1951, the People's Liberation Army and the Republic of China Armed Forces fought in Yanshuai Town. The Republic of China Armed Forces were defeated and evacuated to Myanmar. In 1968, it was renamed Hongyan Commune and then renamed Hongjiu Commune in the next year. In 1971 it was renamed Yanshuai Commune. In 1988, it reverted to its former name of Yanshuai Town. In August 2005, Tuanjie Township (Chinese: 团结乡) was incorporated into Yanshuai Town.

== Administrative division ==
As of 2017, the town is divided into 22 villages: Yanshuai Village, Dongmeng Village, Huangguo Village, Lianhe Village, Yanbing Village, Xinhua Village, Jianshe Village, Hemeng Village, Zhonghemeng Village, Henan Village, Xinzhai Village, Tuanjie Village, Dongmi Village, Bantuo Village, Bannai Village, Gongman Village, Heke Village, Sainong Village, Anhai Village, Anguai Village, Xile Village, and Baling Village.

== Geography ==
There are a number of popular mountains located immediately adjacent to the townsite which include Mount Gongdaogelongya (Chinese: 公刀格龙牙山), Mount Dongmi (Chinese: 东米山), and Mount Gonggei (Chinese: 公给山). The highest point in the town is Mount Gonggei, which, at 2,236 metres (7,336 ft) above sea level.

The Lameng River (Chinese: 拉勐河), Hemeng River (Chinese: 贺勐河) and Xiaohei River (Chinese: 小黑河), tributaries of the Lancang River, flow through the town.

== Economy ==
Agriculture and forestry also play roles in the local economy. The main cash crops are tea, sugarcane, tobacco, walnuts, macadamia nuts and coffee.

== Education ==
The town has 20 primary schools and 2 middle schools.

== Transportation ==
The National Highway G214 passes across the eastern town.
